= List of countries and territories by maritime boundaries =

This is a list of countries and territories by maritime boundaries with other countries and territories. The list encompasses adjacent maritime nations and territories with a special focus on the boundaries or borders which distinguish them.

For purposes of this list, "maritime boundary" includes boundaries that are recognized by the United Nations Convention on the Law of the Sea, which includes boundaries of territorial waters, contiguous zones, and exclusive economic zones. However, it does not include lake or river boundaries. "Potential" maritime boundaries are included; that is, the lack of a treaty or other agreement defining the exact location of the maritime boundary does not exclude the boundary from the list.

In numbering maritime boundaries, three separate figures are included for each country and territory. The first number is the total number of distinct maritime boundaries that the country or territory shares with other countries and territories. If the country shares two or more maritime boundaries with the same country or territory and the boundaries are unconnected, the boundaries are counted separately. The second number is the total number of distinct countries or territories that the country or territory borders. In this instance, if the country or territory shares two or more maritime boundaries with the same country or territory and the boundaries are unconnected, the boundaries are only counted once. The final number is the total number of unique sovereign states (Note: The concept of state sovereignty is somewhat imprecise and there are disagreements about whether certain territories are sovereign. There are currently 195 states that are generally regarded as "fully" or “mostly” sovereign: this includes the 193 member states of the United Nations plus Vatican City and Palestine. Some of these states have under their jurisdiction territories, dependencies, or collectivities that are clearly non-sovereign geographical areas. These territories are generally regarded as being subsumed within the overarching sovereignty of the governing state. For example, the United Kingdom holds sovereignty over the territory of Gibraltar, even though Gibraltar is not considered to be part of the United Kingdom. There are a few territories in the world that are neither clearly sovereign nor clearly subsumed under another state's sovereignty. Often, these territories have declared themselves to be sovereign, but they are either not widely recognized as such or lack some of the necessary conditions for sovereign statehood. In these cases, explanatory footnotes indicate how the territory is treated for the purposes of this list.) that the country or territory shares a maritime boundary with.

Footnotes are provided to provide clarity regarding the status of certain countries and territories. States with a dagger (†) are landlocked states.

Country or territory (Territories without full sovereignty in italics)	No. of unique maritime boundaries	No. of unique maritime neighbours	No. of unique and sovereign maritime neighbours	Maritime boundary neighbours (Territories without full sovereignty in italics) (#) = No. of unique maritime boundaries with that country or territory (J) = boundary settled partially or wholly by arbitration or ICJ judgment (T) = boundary settled partially or wholly by treaty
Abkhazia (Note: In 1992, Abkhazia declared sovereignty from Georgia. Georgia disputes the declaration and considers Abkhazia to be part of its territory. The only sovereign states that recognize Abkhazia's sovereignty are Russia, Nicaragua, Venezuela, and Nauru. Because of the low level of international recognition, Abkhazia is not considered a sovereign state for the purposes of this list and is not included in other countries' listings of neighbouring countries and territories.)	3	3	3	Georgia; Russia; Turkey
(French Southern and Antarctic Lands) Adélie Land (Note: This is a territorial claim in Antarctica. Territorial claims in Antarctica have been recognized only between the few countries making claims in the area. Because some of the claims overlap and there is a low number of recognition for these claims, Antarctic territorial claims are not included in this chart when listing countries' neighbouring countries and territories. The specific Antarctic claims are included in this chart, but only in reference to each other.) (Note: This territory is part of the widely dispersed French Southern and Antarctic Lands, an overseas territory of France.) (France)	2	1	1	(Australia) Australian Antarctic Territory (Australia) (2)
Afghanistan †	0	0	0	
(United Kingdom) Akrotiri and Dhekelia (Note: This territory is not sovereign but is a British Overseas Territory. Its territory constitutes part of the sovereign territory of the United Kingdom but strictly speaking is not part of the United Kingdom itself.) (United Kingdom)	10	3	3	Cyprus (8); Egypt; Lebanon
Albania	3	3	3	Greece; Italy (T) (Note: See Albania–Italy Boundary Agreement.); Montenegro
Algeria	4	4	4	Italy; Morocco; Spain; Tunisia (T)
American Samoa (Note: This territory is not sovereign, but is an insular area of the United States. U.S. territories are considered to be part of the sovereign territory of the United States.) (United States)	5	5	3	Cook Islands (Note: The Cook Islands is a self-governing country in free association with New Zealand. The Cook Islands controls a portion of its own foreign affairs, including the establishment and regulation of borders. However, the Cook Islands is not a member of the United Nations and is part of the Realm of New Zealand, with Cook Island people being New Zealand citizens. For purposes of this list, the Cook Islands, New Zealand, Niue, and Tokelau are considered constituent parts of one sovereign state.) (New Zealand) (T) (Note: See Cook Islands – United States Maritime Boundary Treaty.); Niue (Note: Niue is a self-governing country in free association with New Zealand. Niue controls a portion of its own foreign affairs, including the establishment and regulation of borders. However, Niue is not a member of the United Nations and is part of the Realm of New Zealand, with Niuean people being New Zealand citizens. For purposes of this list, Niue, the Cook Islands, New Zealand, and Tokelau are considered constituent parts of one sovereign state.) (New Zealand) (T) (Note: See Niue – United States Maritime Boundary Treaty.); Samoa; Tokelau (Note: Tokelau is a non-self-governing territory within the Realm of New Zealand. For purposes of this list, Tokelau, the Cook Islands, New Zealand, and Niue are considered constituent parts of one sovereign state.) (New Zealand) (T) (Note: See Treaty of Tokehega.); Tonga
(French Southern and Antarctic Lands) Amsterdam Island and Île Saint-Paul (France)	0	0	0	
Andorra †	0	0	0	
Angola	4	3	3	Democratic Republic of the Congo (2); Republic of the Congo; Namibia (T)
Anguilla (United Kingdom)	4	4	4	Antigua and Barbuda; Netherlands; Saint Martin (Note: This territory is not sovereign, but is an overseas collectivity of France, and as such it is part of the sovereign territory of France.) (France) (T) (Note: See 1996 France – United Kingdom Maritime Delimitation Agreements.); United States Virgin Islands (United States) (T) (Note: See 1993 United Kingdom – United States Maritime Boundary Treaties.)
Antártica Chilena Province (Chile)	3	3	3	Argentine Antarctica (Note: Claims to territory overlap.) (Argentina); British Antarctic Territory (United Kingdom) (Norway) Peter I Island (Norway)
Antigua and Barbuda	5	5	3	Anguilla (United Kingdom); Guadeloupe (Note: This territory is not sovereign but is an overseas department and an overseas region of France. As such, it is sovereign French territory that is an integral part of the French Republic.) (France); Montserrat (United Kingdom); Saint Kitts and Nevis; Saint Barthélemy (France)
Argentina	3	3	3	Chile (J) (Note: See Beagle Channel Arbitration.) (T) (Note: See Treaty of Peace and Friendship of 1984 between Chile and Argentina.); Falkland Islands (Note: Argentina claims sovereignty over the Falkland Islands, which is a British Overseas Territory.) (United Kingdom); Uruguay (T)
Argentine Antarctica (Argentina)	2	2	2	Antártica Chilena Province (Chile); British Antarctic Territory (United Kingdom)
Armenia †	0	0	0	
Aruba (Note: This territory is not sovereign, but is a constituent country within the Kingdom of the Netherlands. For purposes of this list, Aruba, Curaçao, the Netherlands, and Sint Maarten are considered constituent parts of one sovereign state.) (Netherlands)	2	2	2	Dominican Republic; Venezuela (T) (Note: See Netherlands–Venezuela Boundary Treaty.)
Ashmore and Cartier Islands (Note: This territory is not sovereign but is part of the sovereign territory of Australia.) (Australia)	1	1	1	Indonesia (T)
Australia →includes: →Ashmore and Cartier Islands →Christmas Island →Cocos (Keeling) Islands →Heard Island and McDonald Islands → Macquarie Island →Norfolk Island	11	7	6	East Timor (T) (Note: See Timor Sea Treaty.); Indonesia (4) (T) (French Southern and Antarctic Lands) Kerguelen Islands (France) (T) (Note: See Australia–France Marine Delimitation Agreement.); New Caledonia (Note: New Caledonia is not sovereign but is a sui generis collectivity of France and as such it is part of the sovereign territory of France.)(France) (T); New Zealand (2) (T) (Note: See Australia – New Zealand Maritime Treaty.); Papua New Guinea (2) (T); Solomon Islands (T) (Note: See Australia – Solomon Islands Maritime Boundary Agreement.)
Australia (Note: Excluding outlying island territories.)	8	6	6	East Timor (T); Indonesia (2) (T); New Caledonia (France) (T); New Zealand (T); Papua New Guinea (2) (T); Solomon Islands (T)
(Australia) Australian Antarctic Territory (Australia)	4	3	3	(French Southern and Antarctic Lands) Adélie Land (France) (2) (Norway) Queen Maud Land (Norway) (New Zealand) Ross Dependency (New Zealand)
Austria †	0	0	0	
Azerbaijan	4	4	4	Iran (Note: The maritime boundary is in the Caspian Sea. Some consider the Caspian Sea to be a lake.); Kazakhstan; Russia; Turkmenistan
Azores (Note: This territory is not sovereign but is an autonomous region of Portugal. Its territory constitutes a constituent part of the sovereign territory of Portugal.) (Portugal)	0	0	0	
Bahamas	4	4	4	Cuba; Haiti; Turks and Caicos Islands (United Kingdom); United States
Bahrain	3	3	3	Iran (T); Qatar (J); Saudi Arabia (T)
(United States) Baker Island and Howland Island (United States)	1	1	1	Kiribati
Bangladesh	2	2	2	Myanmar; India
Barbados	5	5	4	Guadeloupe (France) (T); Martinique (France) (T); Saint Lucia; Saint Vincent and the Grenadines; Trinidad and Tobago (J) (Note: See Barbados v. Trinidad and Tobago.)
(French Southern and Antarctic Lands) Bassas da India, Europa Island, and Juan de Nova Island (Note: Madagascar claims sovereignty over Bassas da India, Europa Island, and Juan de Nova Island.) (France)	2	2	2	Madagascar; Mauritius
Belarus †	0	0	0	
Belgium	3	3	3	France (T); Netherlands (T); United Kingdom (T)
Belize	3	3	3	Guatemala; Honduras; Mexico
Benin	3	3	3	Ghana; Nigeria; Togo
Bermuda (United Kingdom)	0	0	0	
Bhutan †	0	0	0	
Bolivia †	0	0	0	
Bosnia and Herzegovina	1	1	1	Croatia (T)
Botswana †	0	0	0	
Bouvet Island (Note: This territory is not sovereign and is a dependent territory of Norway. It is not part of the Kingdom of Norway, but it is considered to be part of the sovereign territory of Norway.)	0	0	0	
Brazil	2	2	2	French Guiana (France) (T); Uruguay (T)
British Antarctic Territory (United Kingdom)	3	3	3	Antártica Chilena Province (Chile); Argentine Antarctica (Argentina) (Norway) Queen Maud Land (Norway)
British Indian Ocean Territory (Note: Mauritius claims sovereignty over the Chagos Archipelago and does not recognise the British Indian Ocean Territory. In 2019 116 UN members voted to support Mauritius’claim; 6 voted in support of the United Kingdom.) (United Kingdom)	1	1	1	Maldives
British Virgin Islands (United Kingdom)	2	2	1	Puerto Rico (United States) (T); United States Virgin Islands (United States) (T)
Brunei	2	1	1	Malaysia (2)
Bulgaria	2	2	2	Romania; Turkey(T) (Note: There is also a possible quadripoint with Ukraine (de jure) or Russia (de facto).)
Burkina Faso †	0	0	0	
Myanmar	3	3	3	Bangladesh; India (T); Thailand (T)
Burundi †	0	0	0	
Cambodia	2	2	2	Thailand; Vietnam
Cameroon	2	2	2	Equatorial Guinea; Nigeria (J) (T)
Canada	6	3	3	Greenland (Note: This territory is not sovereign, but is a country within the Kingdom of Denmark. For purposes of this list, Denmark, the Faroe Islands, and Greenland are considered constituent parts of one sovereign state.) (Denmark) (T); Saint Pierre and Miquelon (France) (J) (Note: See Canada–France Maritime Boundary Case.) (T); United States (4) (J) (Note: See Alaska boundary dispute; Pig War.) (T)
Cape Verde	3	3	3	The Gambia; Mauritania (T) (Note: See Cape Verde – Mauritania Maritime Delimitation Treaty.); Senegal (T) (Note: See Cape Verde – Senegal Maritime Delimitation Treaty.)
Cayman Islands (United Kingdom)	4	4	4	Colombia; Cuba; Honduras (T) (Note: See Honduras – United Kingdom Maritime Delimitation Treaty.); Jamaica
Central African Republic †	0	0	0	
Chad †	0	0	0	
Chile	2	2	2	Argentina (J) (T); Peru (J) (Note: See Case Concerning Maritime Delimitation between the Republic of Peru and the Republic of Chile (Peru v. Chile).) (T)
People's Republic of China (Note: For information on the Republic of China, see the listing in this table under "Taiwan".)	11	11	9	Brunei Indonesia; Japan; Malaysia; North Korea; South Korea; Philippines; Taiwan; Vietnam (T) Hong Kong (Note: Hong Kong is not sovereign but since 1997 has been a Special Administrative Region of the People's Republic of China. Hong Kong has a high degree of autonomy, including separate passports and a defined international boundary within China, but it is not considered a separate sovereign state for the purposes of this list.) (SAR of China) (2) Macau (Note: Macau is not sovereign but since 1999 has been a Special Administrative Region of the People's Republic of China. Macau has a high degree of autonomy, including separate passports and a defined international boundary within China, but it is not considered a separate sovereign state for the purposes of this list.) (SAR of China) (2)
Christmas Island (Australia)	1	1	1	Indonesia (T)
Clipperton Island (Note: Clipperton Island is not sovereign but is property of the government of France; as such, it is part of the sovereign territory of France.) (France)	0	0	0	
Cocos (Keeling) Islands (Australia)	0	0	0	
Colombia	12	10	10	Cayman Islands (United Kingdom); Costa Rica (2) (T); Dominican Republic (T); Ecuador (T); Haiti (T) (Note: See Liévano–Brutus treaty.); Honduras (T); Jamaica (T); Nicaragua (J); Panama (2) (T); Venezuela
Comoros	7	7	5	(French Southern and Antarctic Lands) Glorioso Islands (Note: Madagascar claims sovereignty over the Glorioso Islands.) (France); Madagascar; Mayotte (France); Mozambique; Réunion (France); Seychelles; Tanzania
Democratic Republic of the Congo	2	1	1	Angola (2)
Republic of the Congo	2	2	2	Angola; Gabon
Cook Islands (New Zealand)	5	5	3	American Samoa (United States) (T); French Polynesia (France) (T) (Note: See Cook Islands – France Maritime Delimitation Agreement.); Kiribati; Niue (New Zealand); Tokelau (New Zealand)
Costa Rica	7	4	4	Colombia (2) (T); Ecuador (T); Nicaragua (2); Panama (2) (T)
Côte d'Ivoire	2	2	2	Ghana; Liberia
Croatia	4	4	4	Bosnia and Herzegovina (T); Italy (T); Montenegro; Slovenia
(French Southern and Antarctic Lands) Crozet Islands (France)	0	0	0	
Cuba	8	8	7	Bahamas; Cayman Islands (United Kingdom); Haiti (T) (Note: See Cuba–Haiti Maritime Boundary Agreement.); Honduras; Jamaica (T) (Note: See Cuba–Jamaica Maritime Boundary Agreement.); Mexico (T); Navassa Island (Note: Haiti claims sovereignty over Navassa Island, which is a United States insular area.) (United States); United States (T) (Note: Cuba – United States Maritime Boundary Agreement.)
Curaçao (Netherlands)	2	2	2	Dominican Republic; Venezuela (T)
Cyprus	14	7	7	(United Kingdom) Akrotiri and Dhekelia (United Kingdom) (8) (T); Egypt (T); Greece (T); Israel; Lebanon; Syria; Turkey (T)
Czech Republic †	0	0	0	
Denmark (Note: Does not include the Faroe Islands and Greenland.)	6	5	5	Germany (2) (J) (T); Norway (T); Poland; Sweden (T); United Kingdom (T)
Denmark, Kingdom of →includes: →Denmark →Faroe Islands →Greenland	13	9	7	Canada (T); Germany (2) (J) (T); Iceland (2) (T); Jan Mayen (Note: This territory is not sovereign, but is a constituent part of the Kingdom of Norway.) (Norway) (J) (T); Norway (T); Poland; Svalbard (Norway) (T); Sweden (2) (T); United Kingdom (2) (T)
Djibouti	3	3	3	Eritrea; Somalia; Yemen
Dominica	3	3	2	Guadeloupe (France) (T) (Note: See Dominica–France Maritime Delimitation Agreement.); Martinique (France) (T); Venezuela
Dominican Republic	8	7	6	Colombia (T); Haiti (2); Aruba (Netherlands); Curaçao (Netherlands); Puerto Rico (United States); Turks and Caicos Islands (United Kingdom) (T) (Note: See Dominican Republic – United Kingdom Maritime Boundary Agreement.); Venezuela (T)
East Timor	4	2	2	Australia (T); Indonesia (3)
Ecuador	3	3	3	Colombia; Costa Rica (T); Peru (T)
Egypt	9	9	9	Cyprus (T); Palestine (Note: Although it lacks other indicators of legal sovereignty, Palestine is recognized by about 137 countries and is an observer of the United Nations, which makes it de jure sovereign and will be counted in this list as such.); Greece; Israel; Jordan; Libya; Saudi Arabia; Sudan; Turkey
El Salvador	3	3	3	Guatemala; Honduras (J); Nicaragua
Equatorial Guinea	6	4	4	Cameroon; Gabon (2) (T); Nigeria (T) (Note: See Equatorial Guinea – Nigeria Maritime Boundary Treaty.); São Tomé and Príncipe (2) (T) (Note: See Equatorial Guinea – São Tomé and Príncipe Maritime Boundary Treaty.)
Eritrea	4	4	4	Djibouti; Saudi Arabia; Sudan; Yemen (J) (Note: See Hanish Islands conflict.)
Estonia	4	4	4	Finland (T); Latvia (T); Russia; Sweden (T)
Eswatini (Swaziland) †	0	0	0	
Ethiopia †	0	0	0	
(French Southern and Antarctic Lands) Europa Island, Bassas da India, and Juan de Nova Island (France)	2	2	2	Madagascar; Mauritius
Falkland Islands (United Kingdom)	1	1	1	Argentina
Faroe Islands (Denmark)	3	3	3	Iceland; Norway (T); United Kingdom (T)
Fiji	6	6	5	New Caledonia (France) (T) (Note: See Fiji–France Maritime Delimitation Agreement.); New Zealand; Tonga; Tuvalu; Vanuatu; Wallis and Futuna (France) (T)
Finland	3	3	3	Estonia (T); Russia (T); Sweden (T)
France (Note: Excluding French overseas departments, collectivities, and territories.)	9	7	5	Belgium (T); Guernsey (Note: This territory is not sovereign but it a British Crown Dependency. Crown Dependencies are possessions of the British Crown but strictly speaking are not part of the United Kingdom.) (United Kingdom); Italy (T); Jersey (United Kingdom); Monaco (2) (T); Spain (2) (T); United Kingdom (J) (T)
France (including French overseas departments, collectivities, and territories) →includes: →Clipperton Island →French Guiana →French Polynesia →French Southern and Antarctic Lands (Note: Excluding Adélie Land.) →Guadeloupe →Martinique →Mayotte →New Caledonia →Réunion →Saint Barthélemy →Saint Martin →Saint Pierre and Miquelon →Wallis and Futuna	53	39	29	Anguilla (United Kingdom) (T); Antigua and Barbuda (2); Australia (T); Barbados (2) (T); Belgium (T); Brazil (T); Canada (J) (T); Comoros (3); Cook Islands (New Zealand) (T); Dominica (2) (T); Fiji (2) (T); Guernsey (United Kingdom); Heard Island and McDonald Islands (Australia) (T); Italy (T); Jersey (United Kingdom); Kiribati; Madagascar (3) (T); Mauritius (2) (T) (Note: See France–Mauritius Delimitation Convention.); Monaco (2) (T); Montserrat (United Kingdom) (T); Mozambique (2); Netherlands; Norfolk Island (Australia) (T); Pitcairn Islands (United Kingdom) (T) (Note: See 1983 France – United Kingdom Maritime Boundary Convention.); Saint Kitts and Nevis; Saint Lucia (T) (Note: See France – Saint Lucia Delimitation Agreement.); Samoa; Seychelles (T) (Note: See France–Seychelles Maritime Boundary Agreement.); Sint Maarten (Netherlands); Solomon Islands (T) (Note: See France – Solomon Islands Maritime Delimitation Agreement.); Spain (2) (T); Suriname; Tokelau (New Zealand); Tonga (T) (Note: See France–Tonga Maritime Delimitation Convention.); Tuvalu (T) (Note: Provisional agreement only.); United Kingdom (J) (T); Vanuatu; Venezuela (2) (T)
French Guiana (France)	2	2	2	Brazil (T); Suriname
French Polynesia (France)	3	3	3	Cook Islands (New Zealand) (T); Kiribati; Pitcairn Islands (United Kingdom) (T)
French Southern and Antarctic Lands (Note: This territory is not sovereign but is an overseas territory of France.) (France)	6	6	6	Heard Island and McDonald Islands (Australia) (T); Comoros; Madagascar; Mauritius; Mozambique; Seychelles (T)
Gabon	4	3	3	Republic of the Congo; Equatorial Guinea (2) (T); São Tomé and Príncipe (T) (Note: See Gabon – São Tomé and Príncipe Maritime Border Agreement.)
The Gambia	3	2	2	Cape Verde; Senegal (2) (T)
Georgia	2	2	2	Russia; Turkey (T)
Germany	6	5	5	Denmark (2) (J) (T); Netherlands (J) (T); Poland (T); Sweden (T); United Kingdom (T)
Ghana	4	4	4	Benin; Côte d'Ivoire; Nigeria; Togo
Gibraltar (United Kingdom)	3	2	2	Morocco; Spain (2)
(French Southern and Antarctic Lands) Glorioso Islands (France)	3	3	3	Comoros; Madagascar; Seychelles (T)
Greece	6	6	6	Albania; Cyprus (T); Egypt; Italy (T); Libya; Turkey (J)
Greenland (Denmark)	4	4	3	Canada (T); Iceland (T); Jan Mayen (Norway) (J) (T); Svalbard (Norway) (T)
Grenada	2	2	2	Saint Vincent and the Grenadines; Trinidad and Tobago
Guadeloupe (France)	5	5	5	Antigua and Barbuda; Barbados (T); Dominica (T); Montserrat (United Kingdom) (T); Venezuela (T)
Guam (United States)	1	1	1	Federated States of Micronesia
Guatemala	5	4	4	Belize; El Salvador; Honduras; Mexico (2) (T)
Guernsey (United Kingdom)	2	2	1	France; Jersey (United Kingdom)
Guinea	2	2	2	Guinea-Bissau (J); Sierra Leone
Guinea-Bissau	2	2	2	Guinea (J); Senegal (J) (T)
Guyana	3	3	3	Suriname (J); Trinidad and Tobago; Venezuela
Haiti	8	7	7	Bahamas; Colombia (T); Cuba (T); Dominican Republic (2); Jamaica; Navassa Island (United States); Turks and Caicos Islands (United Kingdom)
Heard Island and McDonald Islands (Australia)	1	1	1	(French Southern and Antarctic Lands) Kerguelen Islands (France) (T)
Honduras	9	8	8	Belize; Cayman Islands (United Kingdom) (T); Colombia (T); Cuba; El Salvador (J); Guatemala; Mexico (T); Nicaragua (2) (J)
Hong Kong (People's Republic of China)	2	1	0	People's Republic of China (2)
(United States) Howland Island and Baker Island (United States)	1	1	1	Kiribati
Hungary †	0	0	0	
Iceland	3	3	2	Faroe Islands (Denmark); Greenland (Denmark) (T); Jan Mayen (Norway) (T)
(French Southern and Antarctic Lands) Île Saint-Paul and Amsterdam Island (France)	0	0	0	
India	7	7	7	Bangladesh; Myanmar (T); Indonesia (T); Maldives (T); Pakistan; Sri Lanka (T); Thailand (T)
Indonesia	17	12	10	Ashmore and Cartier Islands (Australia) (T); Australia (2) (T); Christmas Island (Australia) (T); East Timor (3); India (T); Malaysia (3) (J) (T); Palau; Papua New Guinea (2) (T); Philippines; Singapore (T); Thailand (T); Vietnam (T)
Iran	12	10	10	Azerbaijan; Bahrain (T); Iraq; Kuwait; Oman (2) (T); Pakistan; Qatar (T); Saudi Arabia (T); Turkmenistan; United Arab Emirates (2) (T)
Iraq	2	2	2	Iran; Kuwait (J)
Ireland	2	1	1	United Kingdom (T)
Isle of Man (United Kingdom)	0 (Note: The Isle of Man shares maritime boundaries with countries of the United Kingdom but has no maritime boundaries with other sovereign states.)	0	0	
Israel	5	5	5	Cyprus; Egypt; Palestine; Jordan (T); Lebanon
Italy	11	11	11	Albania (T); Algeria; Croatia (T); France (T); Greece (T); Libya; Malta; Montenegro (T); Slovenia (T); Spain (T); Tunisia (T) (Note: See Italy–Tunisia Delimitation Agreement.)
Jamaica	5	5	5	Cayman Islands (United Kingdom); Colombia (T); Cuba (T); Haiti; Navassa Island (United States)
Jan Mayen (Norway)	2	2	2	Greenland (Denmark) (J) (T); Iceland (T)
Japan	6	6	6	People's Republic of China; North Korea; South Korea (T); Northern Mariana Islands (United States); Philippines; Russia (T) (Note: See Treaty of Shimoda.); Taiwan
Jarvis Island (United States)	1	1	1	Kiribati
Jersey	2	2	1	France; Guernsey (United Kingdom)
Johnston Atoll (United States)	0	0	0	
Jordan	3	3	3	Egypt; Israel (T); Saudi Arabia
(French Southern and Antarctic Lands) Juan de Nova Island, Bassas da India, and Europa Island (France)	2	2	2	Madagascar; Mauritius
Kazakhstan	3	3	3	Azerbaijan; Russia; Turkmenistan
Kenya	2	2	2	Somalia; Tanzania (T)
(French Southern and Antarctic Lands) Kerguelen Islands (France)	1	1	1	Heard Island and McDonald Islands (Australia) (T)
Kingman Reef and Palmyra Atoll (United States)	1	1	1	Kiribati
Kiribati	9	9	6	Cook Islands (New Zealand); French Polynesia (France); Howland Island and Baker Island (United States); Jarvis Island (United States); Kingman Reef and Palmyra Atoll (United States); Marshall Islands; Nauru; Tokelau (New Zealand); Tuvalu
North Korea	5	4	4	People's Republic of China; Japan; South Korea (2); Russia (T)
South Korea	4	3	3	People's Republic of China; Japan (T); North Korea (2)
Kosovo (Note: In 2008, Kosovo declared independence from Serbia. Although Kosovo's sovereignty has been recognized by 108 states, it is not a member of the United Nations and Serbia disputes its sovereignty, claiming that Kosovo remains one of its provinces. International Court of Justice decided in 2010 that Kosovo's declaration of independence was not in violation of international law. For purposes of this list, Kosovo is considered to be a sovereign country.) †	0	0	0	
Kuwait	3	3	3	Iran; Iraq (J); Saudi Arabia (T)
Kyrgyzstan †	0	0	0	
Laos †	0	0	0	
Latvia	3	3	3	Estonia (T); Lithuania; Sweden (T)
Lebanon	4	4	4	(United Kingdom) Akrotiri and Dhekelia (United Kingdom); Cyprus; Israel; Syria
Lesotho †	0	0	0	
Liberia	2	2	2	Côte d'Ivoire; Sierra Leone
Libya	5	5	5	Egypt; Greece; Italy; Malta (J) (T); Tunisia (J) (T)
Liechtenstein †	0	0	0	
Lithuania	3	3	3	Latvia; Russia (T); Sweden (T)
Luxembourg †	0	0	0	
Macau (People's Republic of China)	2	1	0	People's Republic of China (2)
(Australia) Macquarie Island (Australia)	1	1	1	New Zealand (T)
Madagascar	6	6	4	Comoros; French Southern and Antarctic Lands (Note: More specifically, Bassas da India, Europa Island, Glorioso Islands, Juan de Nova Island and Tromelin Island) (Note: Madagascar claims sovereignty on Bassas da India, Europa Island, Glorioso Islands and Juan de Nova Island) (Note: Mauritius claims sovereignty over Tromelin Island.) (France); Mayotte (France); Mozambique; Réunion (France) (T); Seychelles
Madeira (Portugal)	2	2	2	Morocco; Spain (T)
Malawi †	0	0	0	
Malaysia	10	6	6	Brunei (2); Indonesia (3) (J) (T); Philippines; Singapore (J) (T) (Note: See Straits Settlement and Johore Territorial Waters Agreement of 1927. This treaty was supplemented by a treaty between Malaysia and Singapore in 1995.); Thailand (2) (T); Vietnam
Maldives	3	3	3	British Indian Ocean Territory (United Kingdom); India (T); Sri Lanka (T)
Mali †	0	0	0	
Malta	2	2	2	Italy; Libya (J) (T)
Marshall Islands	4	4	4	Kiribati; Federated States of Micronesia (T) (Note: See Marshall Islands – Federated States of Micronesia Maritime Boundary Treaty.); Nauru; Wake Island (Note: The Marshall Islands claims sovereignty over Wake Island, which is an insular area of the United States.) (United States)
Martinique (France)	4	4	4	Barbados (T); Dominica (T); Saint Lucia; Venezuela (T)
Mauritania	3	3	3	Cape Verde (T); Senegal; Western Sahara (Note: Western Sahara is a non-self-governing territory. Administration is split between Morocco and the largely unrecognized Sahrawi Arab Democratic Republic, both of which claim sovereignty over the entire territory (see Legal status of Western Sahara). For purposes of this list, Western Sahara is considered to be a sovereign country.) (T) (Note: Treaty is between Mauritania and Morocco. Morocco claims sovereignty over Western Sahara.)
Mauritius	3	3	2	Réunion (France) (T); Seychelles (T) (French Southern and Antarctic Lands) Tromelin Island (France)
Mayotte (France)	2	2	2	Comoros; Madagascar
Mexico	7	5	5	Belize; Cuba (T); Guatemala (2) (T); Honduras (T); United States (2) (T)
Federated States of Micronesia	4	4	4	Guam (United States); Marshall Islands (T); Palau (T); Papua New Guinea
Midway Atoll (United States)	0	0	0	
Moldova †	0	0	0	
Monaco	2	1	1	France (2) (T)
Mongolia †	0	0	0	
Montenegro	3	3	3	Albania; Croatia; Italy (T)
Montserrat (United Kingdom)	4	4	4	Antigua and Barbuda; Guadeloupe (France) (T); Saint Kitts and Nevis; Venezuela
Morocco	8	5	4	Algeria; Madeira (Portugal); Portugal; Spain (4); Western Sahara
Mozambique	6	6	5	Comoros; French Southern and Antarctic Lands (Note: More specifically, Bassas da India, Europa Island, and Juan de Nova Island.) (France); Madagascar; Réunion (France); South Africa; Tanzania (T)
Namibia	2	2	2	Angola (T); South Africa (T)
Nauru	2	2	2	Kiribati; Marshall Islands
Navassa Island (United States)	3	3	3	Cuba; Haiti; Jamaica
Nepal †	0	0	0	
Netherlands (Note: Does not include Aruba, Curaçao and Sint Maarten.)	10	9	6	Anguilla (United Kingdom); Belgium (T); Germany (J) (T); United Kingdom (T); Venezuela (T); Saint Barthélemy (France); Saint Martin (France) (2); Saint Kitts and Nevis; United States Virgin Islands (United States)
Netherlands, Kingdom of the →includes: →Aruba →Curaçao →Netherlands →Sint Maarten	12	11	8	Anguilla (United Kingdom); Belgium (T); Dominican Republic; Germany (T); Guadeloupe (France); Saint Barthélemy (France); Saint Martin (France) (2); Saint Kitts and Nevis; United Kingdom (T); United States Virgin Islands (United States); Venezuela (T)
New Caledonia (France)	6	6	4	Australia (T); Fiji (T); Norfolk Island (Australia) (T); Solomon Islands (T); Vanuatu
New Zealand (Note: Does not include the Cook Islands, Niue, or Tokelau.)	4 (Note: There is a maritime boundary between Norfolk Island and New Zealand, but it is a continuation of the boundary between Australia proper and New Zealand.)	5	3	Australia (T); Fiji (Australia) Macquarie Island (Australia) (T); Norfolk Island (Australia) (T); Tonga
New Zealand, Realm of →includes: →Cook Islands →New Zealand →Niue →Tokelau	11	10	7	American Samoa (United States) (3) (T); Australia (T); Fiji; French Polynesia (France) (T); Kiribati (Australia) Macquarie Island (Australia) (T); Norfolk Island (Australia) (T); Samoa; Tonga; Wallis and Futuna (France)
Nicaragua	6	4	4	Colombia (J); Costa Rica (2); El Salvador; Honduras (2) (J)
Niger †	0	0	0	
Nigeria	5	5	5	Benin; Cameroon (J) (T); Equatorial Guinea (T); Ghana; São Tomé and Príncipe (T) (Note: See Nigeria – São Tomé and Príncipe Joint Development Zone Treaty.)
Niue (New Zealand)	3	3	2	American Samoa (United States) (T); Cook Islands (New Zealand); Tonga
Norfolk Island (Australia)	2	2	2	New Caledonia (France) (T); New Zealand (T)
North Macedonia †	0	0	0	
Northern Cyprus (Note: In 1983, Northern Cyprus declared independence from Cyprus. Northern Cyprus's sovereignty has been recognized by one United Nations member state, Turkey. It is not a member of the UN, and Cyprus disputes its sovereignty. For purposes of this list, Northern Cyprus is not considered to be a sovereign country.)	4	3	3	Cyprus (2); Syria; Turkey
Northern Mariana Islands (United States)	1	1	1	Japan
Norway (Note: Not including Bouvet Island, Jan Mayen, or Svalbard.)	5	5	4	Denmark (T); Faroe Islands (Denmark) (T); Russia (T); Sweden (T); United Kingdom (J) (T)
Norway, Kingdom of (plus dependent Norwegian territories) →includes: →Bouvet Island →Jan Mayen →Norway →Svalbard	7	7	5	Denmark (T); Faroe Islands (Denmark) (T); Greenland (Denmark) (J) (T); Iceland; Russia (T); Sweden (T); United Kingdom (J) (T)
Oman	7	4	4	Iran (2) (T); Pakistan (T); United Arab Emirates (3); Yemen (T)
Pakistan	3	3	3	India; Iran; Oman (T)
Palau	3	3	3	Indonesia; Federated States of Micronesia (T); Philippines
Palestine	2	2	2	Egypt; Israel
(United States) Palmyra Atoll and Kingman Reef (United States)	1	1	1	Kiribati
Panama	4	2	2	Colombia (2) (T); Costa Rica (2) (T)
Papua New Guinea	7	5	4	Australia (2) (T); Indonesia (2) (T); Federated States of Micronesia; Solomon Islands (T) (Note: See Papua New Guinea – Solomon Islands Maritime Boundary Treaty.)
Paraguay †	0	0	0	
Peru	2	2	2	Chile (J) (T); Ecuador (T)
(Norway) Peter I Island	1	1	1	Antártica Chilena Province (Chile)
Philippines	6	6	6	People's Republic of China; Indonesia; Japan; Malaysia; Palau; Vietnam; Taiwan
Pitcairn Islands (United Kingdom)	1	1	1	French Polynesia (France) (T)
Poland	4	4	4	Denmark; Germany (T); Russia (T); Sweden (T)
Portugal (Note: Includes autonomous regions of Portugal.)	5	2	2	Morocco (2); Spain (3) (T)
Puerto Rico (United States)	3	3	3	British Virgin Islands (United Kingdom); Dominican Republic; Venezuela (T) (Note: See United States – Venezuela Maritime Boundary Treaty.)
Qatar	6	4	4	Bahrain (J); Iran (2) (T); Saudi Arabia (2) (T); United Arab Emirates (T)
(Norway) Queen Maud Land (Norway)	2	2	2	(Australia) Australian Antarctic Territory (Australia); British Antarctic Territory (United Kingdom)
Réunion (France)	4	4	4	Comoros; Madagascar (T); Mauritius (T); Mozambique
Romania	3	3	3	Bulgaria; Russia (de facto); Ukraine (J) (Note: See Maritime delimitation between Romania and Ukraine.) (Note: There is also a possible quadripoint with Turkey.)
(New Zealand) Ross Dependency (New Zealand)	1	1	1	(Australia) Australian Antarctic Territory (Australia)
Russia	16	16	15	Azerbaijan; Estonia; Finland (T); Georgia; Japan (T); Kazakhstan; North Korea (T); Lithuania (T); Norway (T); Poland (T); Romania (de facto); Svalbard (Norway) (Note: The maritime boundary between Norway and Russia is continuous from the north edge of the European mainland to the sea between Svalbard and Franz Josef Land. In other words, there are not two separate Russian maritime boundaries for Russia–Norway and Russia–Svalbard. Svalbard therefore acts only to extend the otherwise existing Russia–Norway boundary.) (T); Sweden (T); Turkey (T); Ukraine; United States (T) (Note: See USSR–USA Maritime Boundary Agreement.) (Note: There is also a possible quadripoint with Bulgaria (de facto).)
Rwanda †	0	0	0	
Saint Barthélemy (France)	4	4	3	Antigua and Barbuda; Netherlands; Saint Kitts and Nevis; Sint Maarten (Netherlands)
Saint Helena, Ascension and Tristan da Cunha (United Kingdom)	0	0	0	
Saint Kitts and Nevis	5	5	5	Antigua and Barbuda; Montserrat (United Kingdom); Netherlands; Saint Barthélemy (France); Venezuela
Saint Lucia	4	4	4	Barbados; Martinique (France) (T); Saint Vincent and the Grenadines; Venezuela
Saint Martin	3	3	2	Netherlands; Anguilla (United Kingdom) (T); Sint Maarten (Netherlands)
Saint Pierre and Miquelon (France)	1	1	1	Canada (J) (T)
Saint Vincent and the Grenadines	5	5	5	Barbados; Grenada; Saint Lucia; Trinidad and Tobago; Venezuela
Samoa	4	4	4	American Samoa (United States); Tokelau (New Zealand); Tonga; Wallis and Futuna (France)
San Marino †	0	0	0	
São Tomé and Príncipe	4	3	3	Equatorial Guinea (2) (T); Gabon (T); Nigeria (T)
Saudi Arabia	11	10	10	Bahrain (T); Egypt; Eritrea; Iran (T); Jordan; Kuwait (T); Qatar (2) (T); Sudan; United Arab Emirates (T) (Note: See Treaty of Jeddah (1974).); Yemen (T)
Senegal	5	4	4	Cape Verde (T); The Gambia (2) (T); Guinea-Bissau (J) (T); Mauritania
Serbia †	0	0	0	
Seychelles	5	5	5	Comoros (French Southern and Antarctic Lands) Glorioso Islands (France) (T); Madagascar; Mauritius (T); Tanzania (T)
Sierra Leone	2	2	2	Guinea; Liberia
Singapore	2	2	2	Indonesia (T); Malaysia (J) (T)
Sint Maarten (Netherlands)	1	2	2	Saint Barthélemy (France); Saint Martin (France)
Slovakia †	0	0	0	
Slovenia	2	2	2	Croatia; Italy (T)
Solomon Islands	4	4	4	Australia (T); New Caledonia (France) (T); Papua New Guinea (T); Vanuatu
Somalia	3	3	3	Djibouti; Kenya; Yemen
Somaliland (Note: Somaliland declared independence from Somalia in 1991. However, neither Somalia nor any other state or international organization has recognized Somaliland as a sovereign state. For this reason, Somaliland is not considered a sovereign state for the purposes of this list and is not included in other countries' listings of neighbouring countries and territories.)	3	3	3	Djibouti; Somalia; Yemen
South Africa	2	2	2	Mozambique; Namibia (T)
South Georgia and the South Sandwich Islands (United Kingdom)	0	0	0	
South Ossetia (Note: In 1990, South Ossetia declared sovereignty from Georgia. Georgia disputes the declaration and considers South Ossetia to be part of its territory. The only sovereign states that recognize South Ossentia's sovereignty are Russia, Nicaragua, Venezuela, and Nauru. Because of the low level of international recognition, South Ossetia is not considered a sovereign state for the purposes of this list and is not included in other countries' listings of neighbouring countries and territories.) †	0	0	0	
South Sudan †	0	0	0	
Spain	14	8	7	Algeria; France (2) (T); Gibraltar (United Kingdom) (2); Italy (T); Madeira (Portugal) (T); Morocco (4); Portugal (2) (T); Western Sahara
Sri Lanka	2	2	2	India (T); Maldives (T)
Sudan	3	3	3	Egypt; Eritrea; Saudi Arabia
Suriname	2	2	2	French Guiana (France); Guyana (J)
Svalbard (Norway)	2	2	2	Greenland (Denmark) (T); Russia (Note: The maritime boundary between Norway and Russia is continuous from the north edge of the European mainland to the sea between Svalbard and Franz Josef Land. In other words, there are not two separate Russian maritime boundaries for Russia–Norway and Russia–Svalbard. Svalbard therefore acts only to extend the otherwise existing Russia–Norway boundary.) (T)
Sweden	10	9	9	Denmark (2) (T); Estonia (T); Finland (T); Germany (T); Latvia (T); Lithuania (T); Norway (T); Poland (T); Russia (T)
Switzerland †	0	0	0	
Syria	3	3	3	Cyprus; Lebanon; Turkey
Taiwan	3	3	3	People's Republic of China; Japan; Philippines
Tajikistan †	0	0	0	
Tanzania	4	4	4	Comoros; Kenya (T); Mozambique (T); Seychelles (T)
Thailand	7	6	6	Myanmar (T); Cambodia; India (T); Indonesia (T); Malaysia (2) (T); Vietnam (T)
Togo	2	2	2	Benin; Ghana
Tokelau (New Zealand)	5	5	4	American Samoa (United States) (T); Cook Islands (New Zealand); Kiribati; Samoa; Wallis and Futuna (France)
Tonga	6	6	5	American Samoa (United States); Fiji; New Zealand; Niue (New Zealand); Samoa; Wallis and Futuna (France) (T)
Transnistria (Note: In the early 1990, Transnistria attempted to separate itself, first from the Moldavian SSR and then from sovereign Moldova. Moldova disputes Transnistrian sovereignty and considers it to be part of its territory. There are no sovereign states that recognize Transnistria's sovereignty. Because of the lack of international recognition, Transnistria is not considered a sovereign state for the purposes of this list and is not included in other countries' listings of neighbouring countries and territories.) †	0	0	0	
(French Southern and Antarctic Lands) Tromelin Island (France)	2	2	2	Madagascar; Mauritius
Trinidad and Tobago	5	5	5	Barbados (J); Grenada; Guyana; Saint Vincent and the Grenadines; Venezuela (T)
Tunisia	3	3	3	Algeria (T); Italy (T); Libya (J) (T)
Turkey	9	9	9	Bulgaria (T); Cyprus (T); Egypt; Georgia (T); Greece (J); Russia (T); Syria; Ukraine (T) (de jure); Libya (Note: There is also a possible quadripoint with Romania.)
Turkmenistan	3	3	3	Azerbaijan; Iran; Kazakhstan
Turks and Caicos Islands (United Kingdom)	3	3	3	Bahamas; Dominican Republic (T); Haiti
Tuvalu	3	3	3	Fiji; Kiribati; Wallis and Futuna (France) (T)
Uganda	0	0	0	
Ukraine	3	3	3	Romania (J); Russia; Turkey (T) (de jure) (Note: There is also a possible quadripoint with Bulgaria (de jure).)
United Arab Emirates	7	4	4	Iran (2) (T); Oman (3); Qatar (T); Saudi Arabia (T)
United Kingdom (Note: The United Kingdom does not include British Overseas Territories or Crown Dependencies.)	9	8	7	Belgium (T); Denmark (T); Faroe Islands (Denmark) (T); France (J) (T); Germany (T); Ireland (2) (T); Netherlands (T); Norway (J) (T)
United Kingdom (plus British Overseas Territories and Crown Dependencies) →including: → Akrotiri and Dhekelia →Anguilla →Bermuda →British Indian Ocean Territory →British Virgin Islands →Cayman Islands →Falkland Islands →Gibraltar →Guernsey →Isle of Man →Jersey →Montserrat →Pitcairn Islands →Saint Helena, Ascension and Tristan da Cunha →South Georgia and the South Sandwich Islands →Turks and Caicos Islands	42	30	25	Antigua and Barbuda; Argentina; Bahamas; Belgium (T); Colombia; Cuba; Cyprus (8); Denmark (T); Dominican Republic (T); Egypt; Faroe Islands (Denmark) (T); France (3) (T); French Polynesia (France) (T); Guadeloupe (France) (J) (T); Germany (T); Haiti; Honduras (T); Ireland (2) (T); Jamaica; Lebanon; Maldives; Morocco; Netherlands (T); Norway (J) (T); Puerto Rico (United States) (T); Saint Kitts and Nevis; Saint Martin (France) (T); Spain (2); United States Virgin Islands (United States) (T); Venezuela
United States (Note: Excluding U.S. insular areas.)	9	5	5	Bahamas; Canada (4) (J) (T); Cuba (T); Mexico (2) (T); Russia (T)
United States (including insular areas) →includes: →American Samoa →Baker Island →Guam →Howland Island →Jarvis Island →Johnston Atoll →Kingman Reef →Midway Atoll →Navassa Island →Northern Mariana Islands →Palmyra Atoll →Puerto Rico →United States Virgin Islands →Wake Island	28	21	18	Anguilla (United Kingdom) (T); Bahamas; British Virgin Islands (United Kingdom) (T); Canada (4) (J) (T); Cook Islands (New Zealand) (T); Cuba (2) (T); Dominican Republic; Haiti; Jamaica; Japan; Kiribati (3); Marshall Islands; Mexico (2) (T); Federated States of Micronesia; Netherlands; Niue (New Zealand) (T); Russia (T); Samoa; Tokelau (New Zealand) (T); Tonga; Venezuela (T)
United States Virgin Islands (United States)	4	4	3	Anguilla (United Kingdom) (T); British Virgin Islands (United Kingdom) (T); Netherlands; Venezuela (T)
Uruguay	2	2	2	Argentina (T); Brazil (T)
Uzbekistan †	0	0	0	
Vanuatu	3	3	3	Fiji; New Caledonia (France); Solomon Islands
Vatican City †	0	0	0	
Venezuela	15	15	12	Aruba (Netherlands) (T); Colombia; Curaçao (Netherlands) (T); Dominica; Dominican Republic (T); Guadeloupe (France) (T); Guyana; Martinique (France) (T); Montserrat (United Kingdom); Puerto Rico (United States) (T); Saint Kitts and Nevis; Saint Lucia; Saint Vincent and the Grenadines; Trinidad and Tobago (T); United States Virgin Islands (United States) (T)
Vietnam	6	6	6	Cambodia; People's Republic of China (T); Indonesia (T); Malaysia; Philippines; Thailand (T)
Wake Island (United States)	1	1	1	Marshall Islands
Wallis and Futuna (France)	5	5	5	Fiji (T); Samoa; Tokelau (New Zealand); Tonga (T); Tuvalu (T)
Western Sahara	3	3	3	Mauritania (T); Morocco; Spain
Yemen	5	5	5	Djibouti; Eritrea (J); Oman (T); Saudi Arabia (T); Somalia
Zambia †	0	0	0	
Zimbabwe †	0	0	0	

== See also ==
- List of political and geographic borders
- List of countries and territories by number of land borders
- List of countries and territories by land and maritime borders
- List of maritime boundary treaties
- List of territorial disputes
- Landlocked country
