= France–Mauritius Delimitation Convention =

1980 treaty between France and Mauritius

Convention between the Government of the French Republic and the Government of Mauritius on the delimitation of the French and Mauritian economic zones between the islands of Réunion and Mauritius
- Type: Boundary delimitation
- Signed: 2 April 1980
- Location: Paris, France
- Effective: 2 April 1980
- Parties: France; Mauritius
- Depositary: United Nations Secretariat
- Languages: English; French

The France–Seychelles Delimitation Convention is a 1980 treaty between France and Mauritius which delimits the maritime boundary between Mauritius and the French island of Réunion.

The treaty was signed in Paris on 2 April 1980. The boundary set out by the text of the treaty is 364.8 nautical miles long and trends northeast–southwest. The boundary consists of six straight-line maritime segments defined by seven individual coordinate points. The boundary is an approximate equidistant line between the two territories. The northwest endpoint of the border stops at the exact midway point between Mauritius, Réunion, and Tromelin Island. (The end point is 153 nautical miles (283 km) from each of the islands.) Tromelin Island is claimed by Mauritius, but it's still an unassociated French island which is administered from Reunion.

The convention came into force immediately upon signature. The full name of the treaty is Convention between the Government of the French Republic and the Government of Mauritius on the delimitation of the French and Mauritian economic zones between the islands of Réunion and Mauritius.
