= Cuba–Jamaica Maritime Boundary Agreement =

- Type: Boundary delimitation
- Signed: 18 February 1994
- Location: Kingston, Jamaica
- Effective: 18 July 1995
- Parties: Cuba; Jamaica
- Depositary: United Nations Secretariat
- Language: English; Spanish

The Cuba–Jamaica Maritime Boundary Agreement is a 1994 treaty that delimits the maritime boundary between the island countries of Cuba and Jamaica. The treaty was signed in Kingston, Jamaica on 18 February 1994 and establishes a 175 nautical mile-long, complex border in the waters above the Cayman Trough.

The boundary consists of 105 straight-line maritime segments defined by 106 individual coordinate points. The complexity of the border is a result of adherence to the principle of forming a border at the precise, equidistant line between the two states. The far western border forms an unconfirmed tripoint with the Cayman Islands.

The treaty went into effect on 18 July 1995. Its official name is the Agreement between the Government of the Jamaica and the Government of the Republic of Cuba on the delimitation of the maritime boundary between the two States.
