= Equatorial Guinea–São Tomé and Príncipe Maritime Boundary Treaty =

Border treaty between Central African countries

Equatorial Guinea – São Tomé and Príncipe Maritime Boundary Treaty'
Treaty Regarding the Delimitation of the Maritime Boundary between the Republic of Equatorial Guinea and the Democratic Republic of São Tomé and Príncipe
- Type: Boundary delimitation
- Signed: 26 June 1999
- Location: Malabo, Equatorial Guinea
- Parties: Equatorial Guinea; São Tomé and Príncipe
- Depositary: United Nations Secretariat
- Languages: Portuguese; Spanish

The Equatorial Guinea – São Tomé and Príncipe Maritime Boundary Treaty is a 1999 treaty between Equatorial Guinea and São Tomé and Príncipe which delimits the maritime boundary between the two countries.

The treaty was signed in Malabo on 26 June 1999. The boundary set out by the text of the treaty consists of two separate parts. The first part of the boundary separates Equatorial Guinea's Annobón Island and São Tomé Island. This portion of the boundary consists of four straight-line maritime segments defined by five individual coordinate points. The boundary is an approximate equidistant line between the two islands.

The second part of the defined boundary separates Río Muni (continental Equatorial Guinea) from Príncipe Island. This portion of the boundary is more complex, consisting of 14 straight-line segments defined by 15 individual coordinate points. Like the first part, this portion of the boundary is an approximate equidistant line between the two countries.

The treaty provisionally came into force immediately upon signature. It has not yet been ratified by the countries, in which case it will become "definitively" in force. The full name of the treaty is Treaty Regarding the Delimitation of the Maritime Boundary between the Republic of Equatorial Guinea and the Democratic Republic of São Tomé and Príncipe.
