= Marshall Islands–Federated States of Micronesia Maritime Boundary Treaty =

2006 treaty

Marshall Islands – Federated States of Micronesia Maritime Boundary Treaty
Treaty between the Federated States of Micronesia and the Republic of the Marshall Islands concerning Maritime Boundaries and Cooperation on Related matters
- Type: Boundary delimitation
- Signed: 5 July 2006
- Location: Majuro, Marshall Islands
- Parties: Marshall Islands; Federated States of Micronesia
- Depositary: United Nations Secretariat
- Language: English

The Marshall Islands – Federated States of Micronesia Maritime Boundary Treaty is a 2006 treaty between the Marshall Islands and the Federated States of Micronesia (FSM) that delimits the maritime boundary between the two countries.

The treaty was signed in Majuro on 5 July 2006. The boundary set out by the treaty consists of ten straight-line maritime segments defined by 11 specific coordinate points in the ocean between the two island countries. The treaty was signed by FSM President Joseph J. Urusemal and Marshall Islands President Kessai Note.

The full name of the treaty is Treaty between the Federated States of Micronesia and the Republic of the Marshall Islands concerning Maritime Boundaries and Cooperation on Related matters.
