= Australia–Solomon Islands Maritime Boundary Agreement =

1988 bilateral treaty

Australia – Solomon Islands Maritime Boundary Agreement
Agreement between the Government of Australia and the Government of Solomon Islands establishing certain sea and seabed boundaries
- Type: Boundary delimitation
- Signed: 13 September 1988
- Location: Honiara, Solomon Islands
- Effective: 14 April 1989
- Parties: Australia; Solomon Islands
- Depositary: United Nations Secretariat
- Language: English

The Australia–Solomon Islands Maritime Boundary Agreement is a treaty between the governments of Australia and the Solomon Islands signed in Honiara on 13 September 1988 to delimit a maritime boundary in the ocean and the seabed.

The text of the treaty sets out a relatively short boundary composed of two straight-line maritime segments defined by three individual coordinate points. The boundary represents an approximate equidistant line between Australia and the Solomon Islands and defines the limit of Australian Fishing Zone and the Solomon Islands Exclusive Economic Zone.

The full name of the treaty is Agreement between the Government of Australia and the Government of Solomon Islands establishing certain sea and seabed boundaries. It entered into force on 14 April 1989 after it had been ratified by both countries.
