= Albania–Italy Boundary Agreement =

Agreement between Albania and Italy for the determination of the continental shelf of each of the two countries
- Type: Boundary delimitation
- Signed: 18 December 1992
- Location: Tirana, Albania
- Parties: Albania; Italy
- Depositary: United Nations Secretariat
- Languages: Albanian; Italian

The Albania–Italy Boundary Agreement is a 1992 treaty between Albania and Italy in which the two countries agreed to delimit a maritime boundary between them in the continental shelf.

The treaty was signed in Tirana on 18 December 1992. The text of the treaty sets out boundary in the Strait of Otranto composed of 16 straight-line maritime segments defined by 17 individual coordinate points. The boundary represents an approximate equidistant line between Italy and Albania. The northernmost point of the boundary forms a maritime tripoint with Montenegro; the southernmost point forms a maritime tripoint with Greece. The treaty is unique among maritime boundary treaties in that it allows any dispute regarding the boundary to be referred by either of the countries to the International Court of Justice if it cannot be resolved by diplomatic means within four months.

The full name of the treaty is Agreement between Albania and Italy for the determination of the continental shelf of each of the two countries.
