= France–Solomon Islands Maritime Delimitation Agreement =

France – Solomon Islands Maritime Delimitation Agreement
Agreement on maritime delimitation between the Government of the French Republic and the Government of the Solomon Islands
- Type: Boundary delimitation
- Signed: 12 November 1990
- Location: Honiara, Solomon Islands
- Effective: 12 November 1990
- Parties: France; Solomon Islands
- Depositary: United Nations Secretariat
- Languages: English; French

The France – Solomon Islands Maritime Delimitation Agreement is a 1990 treaty in which France and the Solomon Islands agreed to a maritime boundary between the Solomon Islands and the French territory of New Caledonia.

The treaty was signed in Honiara on 12 November 1990. The text of the treaty is brief and sets out a boundary of three straight-line maritime segments defined by four individual coordinate points. The boundary runs roughly east to west and represents an approximate equidistant line between New Caledonia and the Solomon Islands.

The treaty came into force on the day it was signed. The full name of the treaty is Agreement on maritime delimitation between the Government of the French Republic and the Government of the Solomon Islands.
