= List of political and geographic borders =

Robinson projection map .

== Boundaries ==
Below are separate lists of countries and dependencies with their land boundaries, and lists of which countries and dependencies border oceans and major seas. The first short section describes the borders or edges of continents and oceans/major seas. Disputed areas are not considered.

=== Continents ===
(Notes: Dependencies and islands remote from continental land masses are not considered and are excluded from this list section; thus only continental land borders are considered. The only countries listed either straddle continents or are on a continent border.)

| Continent | Location | Borders | | |
| (alphabetical order) | | Continents | Countries | Oceans / Seas |
|---|---|---|---|---|
| Americas | Northern / Western / Southern | | | Arctic Ocean / Atlantic Ocean / Pacific Ocean / Baffin Bay / Beaufort Sea / Bering Sea / Caribbean Sea / Chukchi Sea / Greenland Sea / Gulf of Mexico / Hudson Bay / Labrador Sea |
| Antarctica | Eastern / Southern / Western | | | Southern Ocean / Amundsen Sea / Ross Sea / Weddell Sea |
| Africa | Eastern / Northern / Southern / Western | Asia | *Egypt | Atlantic Ocean / Indian Ocean / Arabian Sea / Gulf of Guinea / Mediterranean Sea / Mozambique Channel / Red Sea |
| Asia | Northern / Eastern / Southern / Western | Africa / Europe | *Egypt / *Turkey / *Georgia / *Azerbaijan / *Kazakhstan / *Russia / Papua New Guinea | Arctic Ocean / Indian Ocean / Pacific Ocean / Aegean Sea / Andaman Sea / Arabian Sea / Arafura Sea / Aral Sea / Banda Sea / Bay of Bengal / Bering Sea / Black Sea / Caspian Sea / Celebes Sea / Chukchi Sea / East China Sea / East Siberian Sea / Flores Sea / Sea of Japan / Java Sea / Kara Sea / Laptev Sea / Mediterranean Sea / Molucca Sea / Persian Gulf / Sea of Okhotsk / Red Sea / South China Sea / Sulu Sea / Timor Sea / Yellow Sea |
| Australia | Eastern / Southern | | | Indian Ocean / Pacific Ocean / Arafura Sea / Coral Sea / Tasman Sea / Timor Sea |
| Eurasia | Eastern / Northern / Southern / Western | Africa | *Egypt / Papua New Guinea | Arctic Ocean / Atlantic Ocean / Indian Ocean / Pacific Ocean / Aegean Sea / Adriatic Sea / Aegean Sea / Andaman Sea / Arabian Sea / Arafura Sea / Baltic Sea / Banda Sea / Barents Sea / Bay of Bengal / Bay of Biscay / Bering Sea / Black Sea / Caspian Sea / Celebes Sea / Celtic Sea / Chukchi Sea / East China Sea / East Siberian Sea / Flores Sea / Greenland Sea / Ionian Sea / Irish Sea / Sea of Japan / Java Sea / Kara Sea / Laptev Sea / Ligurian Sea / Mediterranean Sea / Molucca Sea / North Sea / Norwegian Sea / Sea of Okhotsk / Persian Gulf / Red Sea / South China Sea / Sulu Sea / Timor Sea / Tyrrhenian Sea / Yellow Sea |
| Europe | Eastern / Northern / Western | Asia | *Kazakhstan / *Russia / *Turkey / *Georgia / *Azerbaijan | Arctic Ocean / Atlantic Ocean / Aegean Sea / Adriatic Sea / Baltic Sea / Barents Sea / Bay of Biscay / Caspian Sea / Celtic Sea / Greenland Sea / Ionian Sea / Irish Sea / Kara Sea / Ligurian Sea / Mediterranean Sea / North Sea / Norwegian Sea / Tyrrhenian Sea |
| North America | Northern / Western | South America | Colombia | Arctic Ocean / Atlantic Ocean / Pacific Ocean / Baffin Bay / Beaufort Sea / Bering Sea / Caribbean Sea / Chukchi Sea / Greenland Sea / Gulf of Mexico / Hudson Bay / Labrador Sea |
| Oceania | Eastern / Northern / Southern / Western | Asia | Indonesia | Indian Ocean / Pacific Ocean / Arafura Sea / Bismarck Sea / Celebes Sea / Coral Sea / Solomon Sea / South China Sea / Sulu Sea / Tasman Sea / Timor Sea |
| South America | Northern / Southern / Western | North America | Panama | Atlantic Ocean / Pacific Ocean / Caribbean Sea |

Section Key:
( * ) = represents a country that crosses a continental land border

=== Countries ===
(Notes: Dependencies are excluded from this section. See below. Only land boundaries are considered; maritime boundaries are excluded; see the List of countries and territories by maritime boundaries. Disputed territories are not considered, other than the inclusion by necessity, in a neutral fashion, of Western Sahara.)

| Name of country | Within | Borders | |
| (alphabetical order) | Continent / Subcontinent | Countries / Dependencies | Oceans / Seas |
|---|---|---|---|
| Afghanistan | Asia | China / India / Iran / Pakistan / Tajikistan / Turkmenistan / Uzbekistan | |
| Albania | Europe | Greece / Montenegro / North Macedonia / Serbia | Atlantic Ocean / Adriatic Sea / Ionian Sea |
| Algeria | Africa | Libya / Mali / Mauritania / Morocco / Niger / Tunisia / Western Sahara | *Atlantic Ocean / Mediterranean Sea |
| Andorra | Europe | France / Spain | |
| Angola | Africa | DR Congo / Namibia / Republic of the Congo / Zambia | Atlantic Ocean |
| Antigua and Barbuda | Caribbean | | Atlantic Ocean / Caribbean Sea |
| Argentina | South America | Bolivia / Brazil / Chile / Paraguay / Uruguay | Atlantic Ocean / Scotia Sea |
| Armenia | Asia | Azerbaijan / Georgia / Iran / Turkey | |
| Australia | Australia | | Indian Ocean / Pacific Ocean / Arafura Sea / Coral Sea / Tasman Sea / Timor Sea |
| Austria | Europe | Czech Republic / Germany / Hungary / Italy / Liechtenstein / Slovakia / Slovenia / Switzerland | |
| Azerbaijan | Asia / Europe | Armenia / Georgia / Iran / Russia / Turkey | Caspian Sea |
| Bahamas | North America | | Atlantic Ocean |
| Bahrain | Middle East | | *Indian Ocean / Persian Gulf |
| Bangladesh | Asia | India / Myanmar (Burma) | *Indian Ocean |
| Barbados | Caribbean | | Atlantic Ocean |
| Belarus | Europe | Latvia / Lithuania / Poland / Russia / Ukraine | |
| Belgium | Europe | France / Germany / Luxembourg / Netherlands | *Atlantic Ocean / North Sea |
| Belize | Central America | Guatemala / Mexico | *Atlantic Ocean / Caribbean Sea |
| Benin | Africa | Burkina Faso / Niger / Nigeria / Togo | *Atlantic Ocean / Gulf of Guinea |
| Bhutan | Asia | China / India | |
| Bolivia | South America | Argentina / Brazil / Chile / Paraguay / Peru | |
| Bosnia and Herzegovina | Europe | Croatia / Serbia / Montenegro | *Atlantic Ocean / Adriatic Sea |
| Botswana | Africa | Namibia / South Africa / Zambia / Zimbabwe | |
| Brazil | South America | Argentina / Bolivia / Colombia / France / Guyana / Paraguay / Peru / Suriname / Uruguay / Venezuela | Atlantic Ocean |
| Brunei | Southeast Asia | Malaysia | *Pacific Ocean / South China Sea |
| Bulgaria | Europe | Greece / North Macedonia / Romania / Serbia / Turkey | *Atlantic Ocean / Black Sea |
| Burkina Faso | Africa | Benin / Ivory Coast / Ghana / Mali / Niger / Togo | |
| Burundi | Africa | DR Congo / Rwanda / Tanzania | |
| Cambodia | Southeast Asia | Laos / Thailand / Vietnam | *Pacific Ocean |
| Cameroon | Africa | Central African Republic / Chad / Republic of the Congo / Equatorial Guinea / Gabon / Nigeria | *Atlantic Ocean / Gulf of Guinea |
| Canada | North America | Denmark / United States | Arctic Ocean / Atlantic Ocean / Pacific Ocean / Baffin Bay / Beaufort Sea / Hudson Bay / Labrador Sea |
| Cape Verde | Africa | | Atlantic Ocean |
| Central African Republic | Africa | Cameroon / Chad / DR Congo / Republic of the Congo / South Sudan / Sudan | |
| Chad | Africa | Cameroon / Central African Republic / Libya / Niger / Nigeria / Sudan | |
| Chile | South America | Argentina / Bolivia / Peru | Pacific Ocean |
| China | Asia | Afghanistan / Bhutan / Hong Kong / India / Kazakhstan / Kyrgyzstan / Laos / Macau / Mongolia / Myanmar / Nepal / North Korea / Pakistan / Russia / Tajikistan / Vietnam | *Pacific Ocean / East China Sea / South China Sea / Yellow Sea |
| Colombia | South America | Brazil / Ecuador / Panama / Peru / Venezuela | Pacific Ocean / *Atlantic Ocean / Caribbean Sea |
| Comoros | Africa | | Indian Ocean |
| DR Congo | Africa | Angola / Burundi / Central African Republic / Republic of the Congo / Rwanda / South Sudan / Tanzania / Uganda / Zambia | Atlantic Ocean |
| Republic of the Congo | Africa | Angola / Cameroon / Central African Republic / DR Congo / Gabon | Atlantic Ocean |
| Costa Rica | Central America | Nicaragua / Panama | *Atlantic Ocean / Pacific Ocean / Caribbean Sea |
| Ivory Coast | Africa | Burkina Faso / Ghana / Guinea / Liberia / Mali | Atlantic Ocean |
| Croatia | Europe | Bosnia and Herzegovina / Hungary / Serbia / Montenegro / Slovenia | *Atlantic Ocean / Adriatic Sea |
| Cuba | Caribbean | | Atlantic Ocean / Caribbean Sea / Gulf of Mexico |
| Cyprus | Europe | Akrotiri / Dhekelia | *Atlantic Ocean / Mediterranean Sea |
| Czech Republic | Europe | Austria / Germany / Poland / Slovakia | |
| Denmark | Europe | Germany / Canada | *Atlantic Ocean / Baltic Sea / North Sea |
| Djibouti | Africa | Eritrea / Ethiopia / Somalia | *Indian Ocean / Red Sea / Gulf of Aden |
| Dominica | Caribbean | | Atlantic Ocean / Caribbean Sea |
| Dominican Republic | Caribbean | Haiti | Atlantic Ocean / Caribbean Sea |
| East Timor | Southeast Asia | Indonesia | *Indian Ocean / Timor Sea |
| Ecuador | South America | Colombia / Peru | Pacific Ocean |
| Egypt | Africa / Middle East | Israel / Libya / Sudan | *Atlantic Ocean / *Indian Ocean / Mediterranean Sea / Red Sea |
| El Salvador | Central America | Guatemala / Honduras | Pacific Ocean |
| Equatorial Guinea | Africa | Cameroon / Gabon | Atlantic Ocean / Gulf of Guinea |
| Eritrea | Africa | Djibouti / Ethiopia / Sudan | *Indian Ocean / Red Sea |
| Estonia | Europe | Latvia / Russia | *Atlantic Ocean / Baltic Sea / Gulf of Finland |
| Eswatini | Africa | Mozambique / South Africa | |
| Ethiopia | Africa | Djibouti / Eritrea / Kenya / Somalia / South Sudan / Sudan | |
| Fiji | Oceania | | Pacific Ocean |
| Finland | Europe | Norway / Russia / Sweden | *Atlantic Ocean / Baltic Sea / Gulf of Bothnia / Gulf of Finland |
| France | Europe / South America | Andorra / Belgium / Brazil / Germany / Italy / Luxembourg / Monaco / Spain / Suriname / Switzerland | Atlantic Ocean / Bay of Biscay / English Channel / Mediterranean Sea / North Sea |
| Gabon | Africa | Cameroon / Republic of the Congo / Equatorial Guinea | Atlantic Ocean / Gulf of Guinea |
| The Gambia | Africa | Senegal | Atlantic Ocean |
| Georgia | Asia / Europe | Armenia / Azerbaijan / Russia / Turkey | *Atlantic Ocean / Black Sea |
| Germany | Europe | Austria / Belgium / Czech Republic / Denmark / France / Luxembourg / Netherlands / Poland / Switzerland | *Atlantic Ocean / North Sea / Baltic Sea |
| Ghana | Africa | Burkina Faso / Ivory Coast / Togo | Atlantic Ocean / Gulf of Guinea |
| Greece | Europe | Albania / Bulgaria / North Macedonia / Turkey | *Atlantic Ocean / Aegean Sea / Ionian Sea / Mediterranean Sea |
| Grenada | Caribbean | | Atlantic Ocean / Caribbean Sea |
| Guatemala | Central America | Belize / El Salvador / Honduras / Mexico | *Atlantic Ocean / Pacific Ocean / Caribbean Sea |
| Guinea | Africa | Ivory Coast / Guinea-Bissau / Liberia / Mali / Senegal / Sierra Leone | Atlantic Ocean |
| Guinea-Bissau | Africa | Guinea / Senegal | Atlantic Ocean |
| Guyana | South America | Brazil / Suriname / Venezuela | Atlantic Ocean |
| Haiti | Caribbean | Dominican Republic | Atlantic Ocean / Caribbean Sea |
| Honduras | Central America | El Salvador / Guatemala / Nicaragua | *Atlantic Ocean / Pacific Ocean / Caribbean Sea |
| Hungary | Europe | Austria / Croatia / Romania / Serbia / Slovakia / Slovenia / Ukraine | |
| Iceland | Europe | | Atlantic Ocean / Arctic Ocean |
| India | Asia | Afghanistan / Bangladesh / Bhutan / China / Myanmar / Nepal / Pakistan / Sri Lanka | Indian Ocean (Gulf of Kutch, Gulf of Khambat, Laccadive Sea, Arabian Sea) / Gulf of Mannar / Bay of Bengal / Andaman Sea |
| Indonesia | Southeast Asia | East Timor / Malaysia / Papua New Guinea | Indian Ocean / Pacific Ocean / Arafura Sea / Banda Sea / Celebes Sea / Java Sea / Molucca Sea / Timor Sea |
| Iran | Middle East | Afghanistan / Armenia / Azerbaijan / Iraq / Pakistan / Turkey / Turkmenistan | Caspian Sea / *Indian Ocean / Gulf of Oman / Persian Gulf |
| Iraq | Middle East | Iran / Jordan / Kuwait / Saudi Arabia / Syria / Turkey | *Indian Ocean / Persian Gulf |
| Ireland | Europe | United Kingdom | Atlantic Ocean / Irish Sea |
| Israel | Middle East | Egypt / Jordan / Lebanon / Syria | *Atlantic Ocean / Mediterranean Sea |
| Italy | Europe | Austria / France / San Marino / Slovenia / Switzerland / Vatican City | *Atlantic Ocean / Adriatic Sea / Ionian Sea / Mediterranean Sea / Tyrrhenian Sea |
| Jamaica | Caribbean | | *Atlantic Ocean / Caribbean Sea |
| Japan | Asia | | *Pacific Ocean / East China Sea / Sea of Japan / Sea of Okhotsk |
| Jordan | Middle East | Iraq / Israel / Saudi Arabia / Syria | *Indian Ocean / Gulf of Aqaba |
| Kazakhstan | Asia / Europe | China / Kyrgyzstan / Russia / Turkmenistan / Uzbekistan | Caspian Sea |
| Kenya | Africa | Ethiopia / Somalia / South Sudan / Tanzania / Uganda | Indian Ocean |
| Kiribati | Oceania | | Pacific Ocean |
| North Korea | Asia | China / South Korea / Russia | *Pacific Ocean / Korea Bay / Sea of Japan / Yellow Sea |
| South Korea | Asia | North Korea | *Pacific Ocean / Sea of Japan / Yellow Sea |
| Kuwait | Middle East | Iraq / Saudi Arabia | *Indian Ocean / Persian Gulf |
| Kyrgyzstan | Asia | China / Kazakhstan / Tajikistan / Uzbekistan | |
| Laos | Southeast Asia | Cambodia / China / Myanmar / Thailand / Vietnam | |
| Latvia | Europe | Belarus / Estonia / Lithuania / Russia | *Atlantic Ocean / Baltic Sea |
| Lebanon | Middle East | Syria / Israel | *Atlantic Ocean / Mediterranean Sea |
| Lesotho | Africa | South Africa | |
| Liberia | Africa | Ivory Coast / Guinea / Sierra Leone | Atlantic Ocean |
| Libya | Africa | Algeria / Chad / Egypt / Niger / Sudan / Tunisia | *Atlantic Ocean / Mediterranean Sea |
| Liechtenstein | Europe | Austria / Switzerland | |
| Lithuania | Europe | Belarus / Latvia / Poland / Russia | *Atlantic Ocean / Baltic Sea |
| Luxembourg | Europe | Belgium / France / Germany | |
| Madagascar | Africa | | Indian Ocean / Mozambique Channel |
| Malawi | Africa | Mozambique / Tanzania / Zambia | |
| Malaysia | Southeast Asia | Brunei / Indonesia / Singapore / Thailand | Indian Ocean / *Pacific Ocean / South China Sea |
| Maldives | Asia | | Indian Ocean |
| Mali | Africa | Algeria / Burkina Faso / Ivory Coast / Guinea / Mauritania / Niger / Senegal | |
| Malta | Europe | | *Atlantic Ocean / Mediterranean Sea |
| Marshall Islands | Oceania | | Pacific Ocean |
| Mauritania | Africa | Algeria / Mali / Senegal / Western Sahara | Atlantic Ocean |
| Mauritius | Africa | | Indian Ocean |
| Mexico | North America | Belize / Guatemala / United States | *Atlantic Ocean / Pacific Ocean / Gulf of Mexico / Caribbean Sea |
| Federated States of Micronesia | Oceania | | Pacific Ocean |
| Moldova | Europe | Romania / Ukraine | |
| Monaco | Europe | France | *Atlantic Ocean / Mediterranean Sea |
| Mongolia | Asia | China / Russia | |
| Montenegro | Europe | Albania / Bosnia and Herzegovina / Croatia / Serbia | *Atlantic Ocean / Adriatic Sea |
| Morocco | Africa | Algeria / *Spain / Ceuta / Melilla / Peñón de Vélez de la Gomera / Western Sahara | Atlantic Ocean / Mediterranean Sea |
| Mozambique | Africa | Eswatini / Malawi / South Africa / Tanzania / Zambia / Zimbabwe | Indian Ocean |
| Myanmar | Southeast Asia | Bangladesh / China / India / Laos / Thailand | *Indian Ocean / Andaman Sea |
| Namibia | Africa | Angola / Botswana / South Africa / Zambia | Atlantic Ocean |
| Nauru | Oceania | | Pacific Ocean |
| Nepal | Asia | China / India | |
| Netherlands | Europe | Belgium / Germany | *Atlantic Ocean / North Sea |
| New Zealand | Oceania | | Pacific Ocean |
| Nicaragua | Central America | Costa Rica / Honduras | *Atlantic Ocean / Pacific Ocean / Caribbean Sea |
| Niger | Africa | Algeria / Benin / Burkina Faso / Chad / Libya / Mali / Nigeria | |
| Nigeria | Africa | Benin / Cameroon / Chad / Niger | *Atlantic Ocean / Gulf of Guinea |
| North Macedonia | Europe | Albania / Bulgaria / Greece / Serbia | |
| Norway | Europe | Finland / Russia / Sweden | Arctic Ocean / Atlantic Ocean |
| Oman | Middle East | Saudi Arabia / United Arab Emirates / Yemen | Indian Ocean / Arabian Sea |
| Pakistan | Asia | Afghanistan / China / India / Iran | Indian Ocean / Arabian Sea |
| Palau | Oceania | | Pacific Ocean |
| Panama | Central America | Colombia / Costa Rica | *Atlantic Ocean / Caribbean Sea / Pacific Ocean |
| Papua New Guinea | Oceania | Indonesia | Pacific Ocean |
| Paraguay | South America | Argentina / Bolivia / Brazil | |
| Peru | South America | Bolivia / Brazil / Chile / Colombia / Ecuador | Pacific Ocean |
| Philippines | Southeast Asia | | Pacific Ocean |
| Poland | Europe | Belarus / Czech Republic / Germany / Lithuania / Russia / Slovakia / Ukraine | *Atlantic Ocean / Baltic Sea |
| Portugal | Europe | Spain | Atlantic Ocean |
| Qatar | Middle East | Saudi Arabia | *Indian Ocean / Persian Gulf |
| Romania | Europe | Bulgaria / Hungary / Moldova / Serbia / Ukraine | *Atlantic Ocean / Black Sea |
| Russia | Asia / Europe | Azerbaijan / Belarus / China / Estonia / Finland / Georgia / Kazakhstan / Latvia / Lithuania / Mongolia / North Korea / Norway / Poland / Ukraine | Arctic Ocean / *Atlantic Ocean / Baltic Sea / Black Sea / Caspian Sea / Pacific Ocean |
| Rwanda | Africa | Burundi / DR Congo / Tanzania / Uganda | |
| Saint Kitts and Nevis | Caribbean | | *Atlantic Ocean / Caribbean Sea |
| Saint Lucia | Caribbean | | Atlantic Ocean / Caribbean Sea |
| Saint Vincent and the Grenadines | Caribbean | | Atlantic Ocean / Caribbean Sea |
| Samoa | Oceania | | Pacific Ocean |
| San Marino | Europe | Italy | |
| São Tomé and Príncipe | Africa | | Atlantic Ocean / Gulf of Guinea |
| Saudi Arabia | Middle East | Iraq / Jordan / Kuwait / Oman / Qatar / United Arab Emirates / Yemen | Indian Ocean / Red Sea / Persian Gulf |
| Senegal | Africa | The Gambia / Mali / Mauritania / Guinea / Guinea-Bissau | Atlantic Ocean |
| Serbia | Europe | Albania / Bosnia and Herzegovina / Bulgaria / Croatia / Hungary / Montenegro / North Macedonia / Romania | |
| Seychelles | Africa | | Indian Ocean |
| Sierra Leone | Africa | Guinea / Liberia | Atlantic Ocean |
| Singapore | Southeast Asia | Malaysia | *Pacific Ocean / *Indian Ocean / South China Sea |
| Slovakia | Europe | Austria / Czech Republic / Hungary / Poland / Ukraine | |
| Slovenia | Europe | Austria / Croatia / Hungary / Italy | *Atlantic Ocean / Adriatic Sea |
| Solomon Islands | Oceania | | Pacific Ocean |
| Somalia | Africa | Djibouti / Ethiopia / Kenya | Indian Ocean / Gulf of Aden |
| South Africa | Africa | Botswana / Eswatini / Lesotho / Mozambique / Namibia / Zimbabwe | Atlantic Ocean / Indian Ocean |
| South Sudan | Africa | Central African Republic / DR Congo / Ethiopia / Kenya / Sudan / Uganda | |
| Spain | Europe / *Africa | Andorra / France / *Morocco / Portugal / *United Kingdom (Gibraltar) | Atlantic Ocean / Bay of Biscay / Mediterranean Sea |
| Sri Lanka | Asia | | Indian Ocean |
| Sudan | Africa | Central African Republic / Chad / Egypt / Eritrea / Ethiopia / Libya / South Sudan | *Indian Ocean / Red Sea |
| Suriname | South America | Brazil / France / Guyana | Atlantic Ocean |
| Sweden | Europe | Finland / Norway | *Atlantic Ocean / Baltic Sea / Gulf of Bothnia |
| Switzerland | Europe | Austria / France / Germany / Italy / Liechtenstein | |
| Syria | Middle East | Iraq / Israel / Jordan / Lebanon / Turkey | Atlantic Ocean / Mediterranean Sea |
| Taiwan | Asia | | Pacific Ocean / East China Sea / South China Sea |
| Tajikistan | Asia | Afghanistan / China / Kyrgyzstan / Uzbekistan | |
| Tanzania | Africa | Burundi / DR Congo / Kenya / Malawi / Mozambique / Rwanda / Uganda / Zambia | Indian Ocean |
| Thailand | Southeast Asia | Cambodia / Laos / Malaysia / Myanmar | Indian Ocean / *Pacific Ocean / South China Sea |
| Togo | Africa | Benin / Burkina Faso / Ghana | Atlantic Ocean / Gulf of Guinea |
| Tonga | Oceania | | Pacific Ocean |
| Trinidad and Tobago | Caribbean | | Atlantic Ocean / Caribbean Sea |
| Tunisia | Africa | Algeria / Libya | *Atlantic Ocean / Mediterranean Sea |
| Turkey | Asia / Europe | Armenia / Azerbaijan / Bulgaria / Georgia / Greece / Iran / Iraq / Syria | *Atlantic Ocean / Mediterranean Sea / Aegean Sea / Marmara Sea / Black Sea |
| Turkmenistan | Asia | Afghanistan / Iran / Kazakhstan / Uzbekistan | Caspian Sea |
| Tuvalu | Oceania | | Pacific Ocean |
| Uganda | Africa | DR Congo / Kenya / Rwanda / South Sudan / Tanzania | |
| Ukraine | Europe | Belarus / Hungary / Moldova / Poland / Romania / Russia / Slovakia | *Atlantic Ocean / Black Sea |
| United Arab Emirates | Middle East | Oman / Saudi Arabia | *Indian Ocean / Persian Gulf |
| United Kingdom | Europe | Ireland | *Atlantic Ocean / North Sea / English Channel |
| United States | North America | Canada / Mexico | Arctic Ocean / Atlantic Ocean / Pacific Ocean / Gulf of Mexico |
| Uruguay | South America | Argentina / Brazil | Atlantic Ocean |
| Uzbekistan | Asia | Afghanistan / Kazakhstan / Kyrgyzstan / Tajikistan / Turkmenistan | |
| Vanuatu | Oceania | | Pacific Ocean |
| Vatican City | Europe | Italy | |
| Venezuela | South America | Brazil / Colombia / Guyana | Atlantic Ocean / Caribbean Sea |
| Vietnam | Southeast Asia | Cambodia / China / Laos | Pacific Ocean / South China Sea |
| Yemen | Middle East | Oman / Saudi Arabia | *Indian Ocean / Arabian Sea / Gulf of Aden / Red Sea |
| Zambia | Africa | Angola / Botswana / DR Congo / Malawi / Mozambique / Namibia / Tanzania / Zimbabwe | |
| Zimbabwe | Africa | Botswana / Mozambique / South Africa / Zambia | |

Section Key:
( * ) = represents a sea (or other body of water)'s parent ocean; also it may represent a dependency's parent country

(Note: All official and unofficial claims by countries and/or governments on the continent of Antarctica are excluded from this section list.)

=== Dependencies ===
(Note: This section lists only dependencies with land boundaries)

| Name of dependency | Within | | Borders | | |
| (alphabetical order) | Country (parent) | Continent / Subcontinent | Countries | Dependencies | Oceans / Seas |
|---|---|---|---|---|---|
| Akrotiri | United Kingdom | Europe | Cyprus | | *Atlantic Ocean / Mediterranean Sea |
| Dhekelia | United Kingdom | Europe | Cyprus | | *Atlantic Ocean / Mediterranean Sea |
| Gibraltar | United Kingdom | Europe | Spain | | *Atlantic Ocean / Mediterranean Sea |
| Hong Kong | China | Asia | China | | * Pacific Ocean / South China Sea |
| Macau | China | Asia | China | | * Pacific Ocean / South China Sea |
| Saint Martin | France | Caribbean | | Sint Maarten, Netherlands | Atlantic Ocean / Caribbean Sea |
| Sint Maarten | Netherlands | Caribbean | | Saint Martin, France | Atlantic Ocean / Caribbean Sea |

Section Key:
( * ) = represents a sea (or other body of water)'s parent ocean

=== Oceans ===
| Name of ocean | Within | Borders | | |
| (alphabetical order) | Hemispheres | Continents | Countries | Dependencies |
|---|---|---|---|---|
| Arctic Ocean | Eastern / Northern / Western | Asia / Europe / North America | Canada / *Denmark / Iceland / Norway / Russia / United States | Greenland (DEN) / Jan Mayen (NOR) / Svalbard (NOR) |
| Atlantic Ocean | Eastern / Northern / Southern / Western | Asia / Europe / North America / South America / Africa | Albania / Algeria / Angola / Antigua and Barbuda / Argentina / Bahamas / Barbados / Belgium / Belize / Benin / Bosnia and Herzegovina / Brazil / Bulgaria / Cameroon / Canada / Cape Verde / Chile / Colombia / Congo, Democratic Republic of the / Costa Rica / Ivory Coast / Croatia / Cuba / Cyprus / Denmark / Dominica / Dominican Republic / Egypt / Equatorial Guinea / Estonia / Finland /France / Gabon / Gambia / Georgia / Germany / Ghana / Grenada / Greece / Guatemala / Guinea / Guinea-Bissau / Guyana / Haiti / Honduras / Iceland / Ireland / Israel / Italy / Jamaica / Latvia / Lebanon / Liberia / Libya / Lithuania / Malta / Mauritania / Monaco / Mexico / Morocco / Namibia / Netherlands / Nicaragua / Nigeria / Norway / Panama / Poland / Portugal / Republic of the Congo / Romania / Russia / Saint Kitts and Nevis / Saint Lucia / Saint Vincent and the Grenadines / São Tomé and Príncipe / Senegal / Sierra Leone / Slovenia / South Africa / Spain / Suriname / Sweden / Syria / Togo / Trinidad and Tobago / Tunisia / Turkey / Ukraine / United Kingdom / United States / Uruguay / Venezuela / Western Sahara / Yugoslavia | Akrotiri (UK) / Anguilla (UK) / Aruba (NLD) / Bermuda (UK) / Bouvet Island (NOR) / British Virgin Islands (UK) / Cayman Islands (UK) / Dhekelia (UK) / Faroe Islands (DEN) / Falkland Islands (UK) / French Guiana (FRA) / Gibraltar (UK) / Greenland (DEN) / Guernsey (UK) / Isle of Man (UK) / Jan Mayen (NOR) / Jersey (UK) / Montserrat (UK) / Netherlands Antilles (NLD) / Puerto Rico (USA) / Saint Helena (UK) / Saint Pierre and Miquelon (FRA) / South Georgia and the South Sandwich Islands (UK) / Svalbard (NOR) / Turks and Caicos Islands (UK) / U.S. Virgin Islands (USA) |
| Indian Ocean | Eastern / Northern / Southern | Africa / Asia / Australia | Australia / Bahrain / Bangladesh / Comoros / Djibouti / East Timor / Egypt / Eritrea / *France / India / Indonesia / Iran / Iraq / Israel / Jordan / Kenya / Kuwait / Madagascar / Malaysia / Maldives / Mauritius / Mozambique / Myanmar (Burma) / Oman / Pakistan / Qatar / Saudi Arabia / Singapore / Somalia / South Africa / Sri Lanka / Sudan / Tanzania / Thailand / United Arab Emirates / *United Kingdom / Yemen | Ashmore and Cartier Islands (AUS) / Bassas da India (FRA) / British Indian Ocean Territory (UK) / Christmas Island (AUS) / Cocos (Keeling) Islands (AUS) / Europa (FRA) / French Polynesia (FRA) / French Southern Territories (FRA) / Glorioso (FRA) / Heard Island and McDonald Islands (AUS) / Juan de Nova (FRA) / Mayotte (FRA) / Réunion (FRA) / Tromelin (FRA) |
| Pacific Ocean | Eastern / Northern / Southern / Western | Asia / Australia / North America / South America | Australia / Brunei / Cambodia / Canada / Chile / China / Colombia / Costa Rica / East Timor / Ecuador / El Salvador / Federated States of Micronesia / Fiji / *France / Guatemala / Honduras / Indonesia / Japan / Kiribati / Malaysia / Marshall Islands / Mexico / Nauru / New Zealand / Nicaragua / North Korea / Palau / Panama / Papua New Guinea / Peru / Philippines / Russia / Samoa / Singapore / Solomon Islands / South Korea / Taiwan / Thailand / Tonga / Tuvalu / *United Kingdom / United States / Vanuatu / Vietnam | American Samoa (USA) / Baker Island (USA) / Clipperton Island (FRA) / Cook Islands (NZ) / Coral Sea Islands (AUS) / French Polynesia (FRA) / Guam (USA) / Hong Kong (CHN) / Howland Island (USA) / Jarvis Island (USA) / Johnston Atoll (USA) / Kingman Reef (USA) / Macau (CHN) / Midway Islands (USA) / New Caledonia (FRA) / Niue (NZ) / Norfolk Island (AUS) / Northern Mariana Islands (USA) / Palmyra Atoll (USA) / Paracel Islands (CHN/TWN/VNM) / Pitcairn Islands (UK) / Spratly Islands (BRN/CHN/TWN/VNM/MYS/PHL) / Tokelau (NZ) / Wake Island (USA) / Wallis and Futuna (FRA) |
| Southern Ocean | Eastern / Southern / Western | Antarctica | | |

Section Key:
( * ) = represents a dependency's parent country

(Note: Seas are excluded from this list section.)

=== Seas ===
| Name of sea | Within | | Borders | | |
| (alphabetical order) | Hemispheres | Oceans | Continents | Countries | Dependencies |
|---|---|---|---|---|---|
| Adriatic Sea | Northern / Eastern | Atlantic | Europe | Albania / Bosnia and Herzegovina / Croatia / Italy / Montenegro / Slovenia | |
| Aegean Sea | Northern / Eastern | Atlantic | Europe / Asia | Greece / Turkey | |
| Arabian Sea | Northern / Eastern | Indian | Africa / Asia | India / Iran / Oman / Pakistan / Somalia / Yemen | |
| Baltic Sea | Northern / Eastern | Atlantic | Europe | Denmark / Estonia / Finland / Germany / Latvia / Lithuania / Poland / Russia / Sweden | |
| Bering Sea | Eastern / Northern / Western | Pacific | Asia / North America | Russia / United States | |
| Black Sea | Eastern / Northern | Atlantic | Asia / Europe | Bulgaria / Georgia / Romania / Russia / Turkey / Ukraine | |
| Caribbean Sea | Western / Northern | Atlantic | North America / South America | Antigua and Barbuda / Belize / Colombia / Costa Rica / Cuba / Dominica / Dominican Republic / France / Grenada / Guatemala / Haiti / Honduras / Jamaica / Mexico / Netherlands / Nicaragua / Panama / St. Kitts and Nevis / St. Lucia / St. Vincent and the Grenadines / Trinidad and Tobago / *United Kingdom / *United States / Venezuela | Anguilla / Aruba / Bonaire / British Virgin Islands / Cayman Islands / Montserrat / Navassa Island / Puerto Rico / Saba / St. Eustatius / United States Virgin Islands |
| Caspian Sea | Eastern / Northern | | Asia / Europe | Azerbaijan / Iran / Kazakhstan / Russia / Turkmenistan | |
| East China Sea | Eastern / Northern | Pacific | Asia | China / Japan / South Korea / Taiwan | Ryukyu Islands (Japan) |
| Mediterranean Sea | Eastern / Northern / Western | Atlantic | Africa / Asia / Europe | Albania / Algeria / Bosnia and Herzegovina / Croatia / Cyprus / Egypt / France / Greece / Israel / Italy / Lebanon / Libya / Malta / Monaco / Montenegro / Morocco / Slovenia / Spain / Syria / Tunisia / Turkey / *United Kingdom | Akrotiri (UK) / Dhekelia (UK) / Gibraltar (UK) |
| North Sea | Eastern / Northern / Western | Atlantic | Europe | Belgium / Denmark / France / Germany / Netherlands / Norway / United Kingdom | |
| Norwegian Sea | Eastern / Northern /Western | Atlantic | Europe | *Denmark / Iceland / Norway / United Kingdom | Faroe Islands (Denmark) / |
| South China Sea | Eastern / Northern | Pacific | Asia | Brunei / Cambodia / China / Indonesia / Malaysia / Philippines / Taiwan / Thailand / Vietnam | Hong Kong (China) / Macau (China) |

Section Key:
( * ) = represents a dependency's parent country

(Note: This section only includes large bodies of water that are designated as a "sea" by a large portion of geographers worldwide.)

== See also ==
- List of artificial islands
- List of countries and territories by land and maritime borders
- List of countries and territories by land borders
- List of divided islands
- Lists of islands
- List of islands by area
- List of islands by population
