= National boundary delimitation =

Drawing borders between countries

In international law, national boundary delimitation (also known as national delimitation and boundary delimitation) is the process of legally establishing the outer limits ("borders") of a state within which full territorial or functional sovereignty is exercised. National delimitation involves negotiations surrounding the modification of a state's borders and often takes place as part of the negotiations seeking to end a conflict over resource control, popular loyalties, or political interests.

Occasionally this is used when referring to the maritime boundaries, in which case it is called maritime delimitation. The term "maritime delimitation" is a form of national delimitation that can be applied to the disputes between nations over maritime claims. An example is found at Maritime Boundary Delimitation in the Gulf of Tonkin. In international politics, the Division for Ocean Affairs and the Law of the Sea (Office of Legal Affairs, United Nations Secretariat) is responsible for the collection of all claims to territorial waters.

== See also ==
- National delimitation in the Soviet Union on the creation of territorial units based on ethnicity in the USSR;
- Nation-building on the processes of creating or strengthening national identity within national territorial limits.
- Sugauli Treaty
- Maritime delimitation between Romania and Ukraine
- Georges Bank
- List of maritime boundary treaties
