= List of maritime boundary treaties =

This is a list of maritime boundary treaties. Maritime boundary treaties are treaties that establish a specified ocean or sea boundary between two or more countries or territories. These are also called maritime boundary agreements, maritime delimitation treaties, or maritime delimitation agreements.

== Africa ==
Country 1	Country 2	Agreement date	Treaty name	Notes
France	Portugal	26 Apr 1960	Exchange of Notes between France and Portugal regarding the maritime boundary between Senegal and Portuguese Guinea	Senegal and Guinea-Bissau are successor states to this agreement
Tunisia	Italy	20 Aug 1971	Agreement between the Government of the Republic of Tunisia and the Government of the Italian Republic concerning the Delimitation of the Continental Shelf between the two Countries	
Equatorial Guinea	Gabon	12 Sep 1974	Convention demarcating the land and maritime frontiers of Equatorial Guinea and Gabon	In 2004, Equatorial Guinea objected to the authenticity of the treaty
Cameroon	Nigeria	1 Jun 1975	Maroua Declaration	In a case before the International Court of Justice, Nigeria argued that the declaration was invalid because although it had been signed by its head of state, it had not been ratified by the Nigerian government. In 2002, the ICJ rejected this argument and held that the argument entered into force upon signing.
Gambia	Senegal	4 Jun 1975	Treaty fixing the maritime boundaries between the Republic of the Gambia and the Republic of Senegal	
Kenya	Tanzania	17 Dec 1975 to 9 Jul 1976	Exchange of Notes between the United Republic of Tanzania and Kenya concerning the Delimitation of the Territorial Waters Boundary between the two States, 17 December 1975 – 9 July 1976	
Mauritania	Morocco	14 Apr 1976	Convention concerning the State frontier line established between the Islamic Republic of Mauritania and the Kingdom of Morocco	
France	Mauritius	2 Apr 1980	Convention between the Government of the French Republic and the Government of Mauritius on the delimitation of the French and Mauritian economic zones between the islands of Reunion and Mauritius	Establishes Réunion – Mauritius boundary
Libya	Malta	10 Nov 1986	Agreement between the Great Socialist People's Libyan Arab Jamahariya and the Republic of Malta implementing Article III of the Special Agreement and the Judgment of the International Court of Justice	
Libya	Tunisia	8 Aug 1988	Agreement between the Libyan Arab Socialist People's Jamahariya and the Republic of Tunisia to Implement the Judgment of the International Court of Justice in the Tunisia/Libya Continental Shelf Case	
Mozambique	Tanzania	28 Dec 1988	Agreement between the Government of the United Republic of Tanzania and the Government of the People's Republic of Mozambique regarding the Tanzania / Mozambique Boundary	
Cape Verde	Senegal	17 Feb 1993	Treaty on the delimitation of the maritime frontier between the Republic of Cape Verde and the Republic of Senegal	
Guinea-Bissau	Senegal	13 Oct 1993	Management and Cooperation Agreement between the Government of the Republic of Senegal and the Government of the Republic of Guinea-Bissau	
Namibia	South Africa	28 Feb 1994	Treaty between the Government of the Republic of Namibia and the Government of the Republic of South Africa with respect to Walvis Bay and the off-shore Islands	
Equatorial Guinea	São Tomé and Príncipe	26 Jun 1999	Treaty Regarding the Delimitation of the Maritime Boundary between the Republic of Equatorial Guinea and the Democratic Republic of São Tomé and Príncipe	
Equatorial Guinea	Nigeria	23 Sep 2000	Treaty between the Federal Republic of Nigeria and the Republic of Equatorial Guinea concerning their maritime boundary	
France	Seychelles	19 Feb 2001	Agreement between the Government of the French Republic and the Government of the Republic of Seychelles concerning Delimitation of the Maritime Boundary of the Exclusive Economic Zone and the Continental Shelf of France and of Seychelles	Establishes (French Southern and Antarctic Lands) Glorioso Islands – Seychelles boundary
Nigeria	São Tomé and Príncipe	21 Feb 2001	Treaty between the Federal Republic of Nigeria and the Democratic Republic of São Tomé and Príncipe on the Joint Development of Petroleum and other Resources, in respect of Areas of the Exclusive Economic Zone of the Two States	
Gabon	São Tomé and Príncipe	26 Apr 2001	Agreement on the Delimitation of the Maritime Border between the Gabonese Republic and the Democratic Republic of São Tomé and Príncipe	
Seychelles	Tanzania	23 Jan 2002	Agreement between the Government of the United Republic of Tanzania and the Government of the Republic of Seychelles on the Delimitation of the Maritime Boundary of the Exclusive Economic Zone and Continental Shelf	
Algeria	Tunisia	11 Feb 2002	Agreement on Provisional Arrangements for the Delimitation of the Maritime Boundaries between the Republic of Tunisia and the People's Democratic Republic of Algeria	
Angola	Namibia	4 Jun 2002	Accord on the delimitation of the maritime border between Angola and Namibia	
Egypt	Cyprus	17 Feb 2003	Agreement between the Republic of Cyprus and the Arab Republic of Egypt on the Delimitation of the Exclusive Economic Zone	
Cape Verde	Mauritania	23 Apr 2004	Treaty on the Delimitation of the Maritime Frontier between the Islamic Republic of Mauritania and the Republic of Cape Verde	
France	Madagascar	14 Apr 2005	Agreement between the Government of the French Republic and the Government of the Republic of Madagascar concerning the delimitation of maritime spaces located between the Reunion Island and Madagascar	Establishes Réunion – Madagascar boundary
Benin	Nigeria	August 2005	Maritime Boundary Agreement	
Cameroon	Nigeria	14 Mar 2008	Agreement between the Republic of Cameroon and the Federal Republic of Nigeria on the delimitation of their maritime border (with maps)	
Mauritius	Seychelles	29 Jul 2008	Agreement between the Government of the Republic of Mauritius and the Government of the Republic of Seychelles on the Delimitation of the Exclusive Economic Zone between the Two States	
Kenya	Tanzania	23 Jun 2009	Agreement between the United Republic of Tanzania and the Republic of Kenya on the delimitation of the maritime boundary of the exclusive economic zone and the continental shelf (with map)	

== Americas ==
Country 1	Country 2	Agreement date	Treaty name	Notes
Guatemala	Mexico	27 Sep 1882	Treaty on the delimitation of the border between Mexico and Guatemala	Establishes land and maritime boundaries between the two countries
United Kingdom	Venezuela	26 Feb 1942	Treaty between the United Kingdom and Venezuela relating to the Submarine Areas of the Gulf of Paria	Trinidad and Tobago is a successor state to the treaty
United Kingdom	United States	13 Aug 1947 and 23 Oct 1947	Exchange of notes constituting an agreement between the United States of America and the United Kingdom of Great Britain and Northern Ireland relating to the delimitation of the area within territorial waters adjacent to the leased naval base at Argentia, Newfoundland	Canada is a successor state to the agreement
Chile	Peru	18 Aug 1952	Declaration on the maritime zone	Trilateral treaty
Ecuador	Peru	18 Aug 1952	Declaration on the maritime zone	Trilateral treaty
Chile	Peru	4 Dec 1954	Agreement on the Special Maritime Boundary Zone	Trilateral treaty
Ecuador	Peru	4 Dec 1954	Agreement on the Special Maritime Boundary Zone	Trilateral treaty
Canada	France	27 Mar 1972	Agreement between the Government of Canada and the Government of the French Republic on Their Mutual Fishing Relations	Establishes Canada – Saint Pierre and Miquelon boundary
Brazil	Uruguay	21 Jul 1972	Exchange of notes constituting an Agreement between the Government of Brazil and the Government of Uruguay on the definitive demarcation of the sea outlet of the River Chui and the lateral maritime border	
Argentina	Uruguay	19 Nov 1973	Treaty between Uruguay and Argentina concerning the Rio de la Plata and the Corresponding Maritime Boundary	
Canada	Denmark	17 Dec 1973	Agreement between the Government of the Kingdom of Denmark and the Government of Canada relating to the Delimitation of the Continental Shelf between Greenland and Canada	Establishes Canada – Greenland boundary
Colombia	Ecuador	23 Aug 1975	Agreement concerning delimitation of marine and submarine areas and maritime co-operation between the Republics of Colombia and Ecuador	
Cuba	Mexico	26 Jul 1976	Exchange of notes constituting an agreement on the delimitation of the exclusive economic zone of Mexico in the sector adjacent to Cuban maritime areas	
Colombia	Panama	20 Nov 1976	Treaty on the Delimitation of Marine and Submarine Areas and Related Matters between the Republic of Panama and the Republic of Colombia	
Colombia	Costa Rica	17 Mar 1977	Treaty on Delimitation of Marine and Submarine Areas and Maritime Cooperation between the Republic of Colombia and the Republic of Costa Rica	
Cuba	Haiti	27 Oct 1977	Agreement between the Republic of Haiti and the Republic of Cuba Regarding the Delimitation of Maritime Boundaries between the Two States	
Cuba	United States	16 Dec 1977	Maritime Boundary Agreement Between the United States of America and the Republic of Cuba	Treaty was never ratified by the United States.
Colombia	Dominican Republic	13 Jan 1978	Agreement on Delimitation of Marine and Submarine Areas and Maritime Cooperation between the Republic of Colombia and the Dominican Republic	
Colombia	Haiti	17 Feb 1978	Agreement on Delimitation of the Maritime Boundaries between the Republic of Colombia and the Republic of Haiti	
Argentina	Chile	20 Feb 1978	Act of Puerto Montt	
United States	Venezuela	28 Mar 1978	Maritime boundary Treaty between the United States of America and the Republic of Venezuela	Establishes: 1. Puerto Rico – Venezuela boundary 2. United States Virgin Islands – Venezuela boundary
Netherlands	Venezuela	31 Mar 1978	Boundary Delimitation Treaty between the Republic of Venezuela and the Kingdom of the Netherlands	Established: 1. Netherlands Antilles – Venezuela boundary 2. Aruba – Venezuela boundary
Argentina	Chile	2 May 1978	Exchange of notes between Argentina and Chile constituting an agreement relating to the Final Act approving the proposals of the First Joint Commission established by the Act of Puerto Montt (with Final Act of the First Joint Commission dated on 6 April 1978)	
Mexico	United States	4 May 1978	Treaty on Maritime Boundaries between the United Mexican States and the United States of America (Caribbean Sea and Pacific Ocean)	
Dominican Republic	Venezuela	3 May 1979	Treaty on the Delimitation of Marine and Submarine Areas between the Republic of Venezuela and the Dominican Republic	
Canada	United States	29 Mar 1979	Special Agreement between the Government of Canada and the Government of the United States of America to Submit to a Chamber of the International Court of Justice the Delimitation of the Maritime Boundary in the Gulf of Maine Area	
Costa Rica	Panama	2 Feb 1980	Treaty Concerning Delimitation of Marine Areas and Maritime Cooperation between the Republic of Costa Rica and the Republic of Panama	
France	Venezuela	17 Jul 1980	Delimitation Treaty between the Government of the French Republic and the Government of the Republic of Venezuela	Establishes: 1. Guadeloupe – Venezuela boundary 2. Martinique – Venezuela boundary
Brazil	France	30 Jan 1981	Maritime Delimitation Treaty between the Federative Republic of Brazil and the French Republic	Establishes Brazil – French Guiana boundary
France	Saint Lucia	4 Mar 1981	Agreement on Delimitation between the Government of the French Republic and the Government of Saint Lucia	Establishes Martinique – Saint Lucia boundary
Colombia	Costa Rica	6 Apr 1984	Treaty on the Delimitation of Marine and Submarine Areas and Maritime Cooperation between the Republic of Colombia and the Republic of Costa Rica, additional to the Treaty signed at San José on 17 March 1977	
Argentina	Chile	29 Nov 1984	Treaty of Peace and Friendship between Chile and Argentina (with annexes and maps)	
Costa Rica	Ecuador	12 Mar 1985	Agreement between the Government of Costa Rica and the Government of Ecuador Relating to the Delimitation of the Maritime Areas between Costa Rica and Ecuador	
Colombia	Honduras	2 Aug 1986	Maritime Delimitation Treaty between Colombia and Honduras	
Dominica	France	7 Sep 1987	Agreement on Maritime Delimitation between the Government of French Republic and the Government of Dominica	Establishes: 1. Dominica – Guadeloupe boundary 2. Dominica – Martinique boundary
Argentina	Uruguay	18 Jun 1988	Exchange of notes constituting an agreement between the Argentine Republic and the Eastern Republic of Uruguay entrusting the Rio de la Plata Administrative Commission with the delimitation of the boundary between Martin Garcia and Timoteo Domínguez Islands	
Trinidad and Tobago	Venezuela	18 Apr 1990	Treaty between the Republic of Trinidad and Tobago and the Republic of Venezuela on the delimitation of marine and submarine areas	
Soviet Union	United States	1 Jun 1990	Agreement between the United States of America and the Union of Soviet Socialist Republics on the maritime boundary	The treaty was never ratified by the Soviet Union or Russia.
United Kingdom	United States	5 Nov 1993	1. Treaty between the Government of the United Kingdom of Great Britain and Northern Ireland and the Government of the United States of America on the Delimitation in the Caribbean of a Maritime Boundary between the US Virgin Islands and Anguilla; 2. Agreement between the Government of the United Kingdom of Great Britain and Northern Ireland and the Government of the United States of America on the Delimitation in the Caribbean of a Maritime Boundary between Puerto Rico/US Virgin Islands and the British Virgin Islands	Establishes: 1. Anguilla – United States Virgin Islands boundary 2. British Virgin Islands – United States Virgin Islands boundary 3. British Virgin Islands – Puerto Rico border
Colombia	Jamaica	12 Nov 1993	Maritime delimitation treaty between Jamaica and the Republic of Colombia	
Cuba	Jamaica	18 Feb 1994	Agreement between the Government of the Jamaica and the Government of the Republic of Cuba on the delimitation of the maritime boundary between the two States	
France	United Kingdom	27 Jun 1996	1. Agreement on maritime delimitation between the Government of the French Republic and the Government of the United Kingdom of Great Britain and Northern Ireland concerning Saint Martin and Saint Barthelemy, on one hand, and Anguilla on the other 2. Agreement on maritime delimitation between the Government of the French Republic and the Government of the United Kingdom of Great Britain and Northern Ireland concerning Guadeloupe and Montserrat	Establishes: 1. (Collectivity of Saint Martin) Saint Martin – Anguilla boundary 2. Guadeloupe – Montserrat boundary
Dominican Republic	United Kingdom	2 Aug 1996	Agreement between the Government of the United Kingdom of Great Britain and Northern Ireland and the Government of the Dominican Republic concerning the delimitation of the Maritime Boundary between the Dominican Republic and the Turks and Caicos Islands	Establishes Dominican Republic – Turks and Caicos Islands boundary
Mexico	United States	9 Jun 2000	Treaty between the Government of the United States of America and the Government of the United Mexican States on the Delimitation of the Continental Shelf in the Western Gulf of Mexico beyond 200 Nautical Miles	
Honduras	United Kingdom	4 Dec 2001	Treaty between the Government of the Republic of Honduras and the Government of the United Kingdom of Great Britain and Northern Ireland concerning the delimitation of the maritime areas between the Cayman Islands and the Republic of Honduras	Establishes Honduras – Cayman Islands boundary
Honduras	Mexico	18 Apr 2005	Maritime Delimitation Treaty between the Government of the United Mexican States and the Government of the Republic of Honduras	
Barbados	France	15 Oct 2009	Barbados/France Maritime Boundary Delimitation Treaty	Establishes Barbados – Guadeloupe and Barbados – Martinique boundaries
Grenada	Trinidad and Tobago	21 Apr 2010	Treaty between the Republic of Trinidad and Tobago and Grenada on the delimitation of marine and submarine areas (with map)	
Bahamas	Cuba	3 Oct 2011	Agreement between the Commonwealth of the Bahamas and the Republic of Cuba for the delimiting line between their maritime zones (with schedule and map)	

== Asia ==
Country 1	Country 2	Agreement date	Treaty name	Notes
Japan	Russian Empire	7 Feb 1855	Treaty of Shimoda	
Johor Sultanate	United Kingdom	19 Oct 1927	Straits Settlement and Johore Territorial Waters Agreement of 1927	Malaysia and Singapore are successor states to the treaty
Bahrain	Saudi Arabia	22 Feb 1958	Bahrain–Saudi Arabia boundary agreement	
Qatar	Saudi Arabia	4 Dec 1965	Agreement on the delimitation of the offshore and land boundaries between the Kingdom of Saudi Arabia and Qatar	
Abu Dhabi	Dubai	18 Feb 1968	Offshore boundary agreement between Abu Dhabi and Dubai	This boundary is now an internal boundary of the United Arab Emirates
Iran	Saudi Arabia	24 Oct 1968	Agreement concerning the sovereignty over the islands of Al-'Arabiyah and Farsi and the delimitation of the boundary line separating submarine areas between the Kingdom of Saudi Arabia and Iran (with exchanges of letters, map and English translation)	
Abu Dhabi	Qatar	30 Mar 1969	Agreement on settlement of maritime boundary lines and sovereign rights over islands between Qatar and Abu Dhabi	United Arab Emirates is a successor state to the treaty
Iran	Qatar	20 Sep 1969	Agreement concerning the boundary line dividing the continental shelf between Iran and Qatar	
Indonesia	Malaysia	27 Oct 1969	Agreement between the Government of Malaysia and the Government of Indonesia on the delimitation of the continental shelves between the two countries	
Indonesia	Malaysia	17 Mar 1970	Treaty between the Republic of Indonesia and Malaysia Relating to the delimitation of the Territorial Seas of the Two Countries in the Strait of Malacca	
Bahrain	Iran	17 Jun 1971	Agreement concerning Delimitation of the Continental Shelf between Iran and Bahrain	
Indonesia	Thailand	17 Dec 1971	Agreement between the Government of the Kingdom of Thailand and the Government of the Republic of Indonesia relating to the Delimitation of a Continental Shelf Boundary between the two Countries in the Northern Part of the Straits of Malacca and in the Andaman Sea	
Indonesia	Thailand	21 Dec 1971	Agreement between the Government of the Republic of Indonesia, The Government of Malaysia and the Government of the Kingdom of Thailand Relating to the Delimitation of the Continental Shelf Boundaries in the Northern Part of the Strait of Malacca	Trilateral treaty
Indonesia	Malaysia	21 Dec 1971	Agreement between the Government of the Republic of Indonesia, The Government of Malaysia and the Government of the Kingdom of Thailand Relating to the Delimitation of the Continental Shelf Boundaries in the Northern Part of the Strait of Malacca	Trilateral treaty
Malaysia	Thailand	21 Dec 1971	Agreement between the Government of the Republic of Indonesia, The Government of Malaysia and the Government of the Kingdom of Thailand Relating to the Delimitation of the Continental Shelf Boundaries in the Northern Part of the Strait of Malacca	Trilateral treaty
Indonesia	Singapore	25 May 1973	Agreement Stipulating the Territorial Sea Boundary Lines between Indonesia and the Republic of Singapore in the Strait of Singapore	
Japan	South Korea	30 Jan 1974	Agreement between Japan and the Republic of Korea concerning the Establishment of Boundary in the Northern Part of the Continental Shelf adjacent to the two Countries	
India	Sri Lanka	10 Jul 1974	Agreement between Sri Lanka and India on the boundary in historic waters between the two countries and related matters (with map)	
Iran	Oman	25 Jul 1974	Agreement concerning Delimitation of the Continental Shelf between Iran and Oman	
Saudi Arabia	United Arab Emirates	21 Aug 1974	Agreement on the delimitation of boundaries	
Dubai	Iran	31 Aug 1974	Offshore Boundary Agreement between Iran and Dubai	United Arab Emirates is a successor state to the treaty
Indonesia	Thailand	11 Dec 1975	Agreement between the Government of the Kingdom of Thailand and the Government of the Republic of Indonesia relating to the delimitation of the sea-bed boundary between the two countries in the Andaman Sea (with charts)	
India	Sri Lanka	23 Mar 1976	Agreement between Sri Lanka and India on the Maritime Boundary between the two Countries in the Gulf of Mannar and the Bay of Bengal and Related Matters	
India	Maldives	23–24, 31 Jul 1976	Agreement between Sri Lanka, India and Maldives concerning the determination of the trijunction point between the three countries in the Gulf of Mannar	Trilateral treaty
India	Sri Lanka	23–24, 31 Jul 1976	Agreement between Sri Lanka, India and Maldives concerning the determination of the trijunction point between the three countries in the Gulf of Mannar	Trilateral treaty
Maldives	Sri Lanka	23–24, 31 Jul 1976	Agreement between Sri Lanka, India and Maldives concerning the determination of the trijunction point between the three countries in the Gulf of Mannar	Trilateral treaty
India	Sri Lanka	22 Nov 1976	Supplementary Agreement between Sri Lanka and India on the extension of the maritime boundary between the two countries in the Gulf of Mannar from position 13 m to the trijunction point between Sri Lanka, India and Maldives (point T)	
India	Maldives	28 Dec 1976	Agreement between India and Maldives on Maritime Boundary in The Arabian Sea and Related Matters	
India	Indonesia	14 Jan 1977	Agreement between the Government of the Republic of India and the Government of the Republic of Indonesia on the Extension of the 1974 Continental Shelf Boundary between the two Countries in the Andaman Sea and the Indian Ocean	Establishes (India) Andaman and Nicobar Islands – Indonesia boundary
India	Thailand	22 Jun 1978	Agreement between the Government of the Kingdom of Thailand and the Government of the Republic of India on the Delimitation of Seabed Boundary between the two Countries in the Andaman Sea	Establishes the (India) Andaman and Nicobar Islands – Thailand boundary
Soviet Union	Turkey	23 Jun 1978	Agreement between the Government of the Republic of Turkey and the Government of the Union of Soviet Socialist Republics concerning the Delimitation of the Continental Shelf Between the Republic of Turkey and the Union of Soviet Socialist Republics in the Black Sea	Georgia, Russia, and Ukraine are successor states to the treaty
Malaysia	Thailand	24 Oct 1979	1. Treaty between the Kingdom of Thailand and Malaysia relating to the Delimitation of the Territorial Seas of the two Countries; 2. Memorandum of Understanding between the Kingdom of Thailand and Malaysia on the Delimitation of the Continental Shelf Boundary between the two Countries in the Gulf of Thailand	
Burma	Thailand	25 Jul 1980	Agreement between the Government of the Kingdom of Thailand and the Government of the Socialist Republic of the Union of Burma on the Delimitation of the Maritime Boundary between the two Countries in the Andaman Sea	
Indonesia	Papua New Guinea	13 Dec 1980	Agreement between the Government of Indonesia and the Government of Papua New Guinea Concerning the Maritime Boundary between the Republic of Indonesia and Papua New Guinea and Cooperation on related Matters	
North Korea	Soviet Union	17 Apr 1985	Agreement between the Union of the Soviet Socialist Republics and on the Delimitation of the Soviet-Korean National Border	Russia is a successor state to the treaty
North Korea	Soviet Union	22 Jan 1986	Agreement between the Union of Soviet Socialist Republics and the Democratic People’s Republic of Korea on the Delimitation of the Economic Zone and the Continental Shelf	Russia is a successor state to the treaty
Burma	India	23 Dec 1986	Agreement between the Socialist Republic of the Union of Burma and the Republic of India on the Delimitation of the Maritime Boundary in the Andaman Sea, in the Coco Channel and in the Bay of Bengal	Establishes Burma – (India) Andaman and Nicobar Islands boundary
Soviet Union	United States	1 Jun 1990	Agreement between the United States of America and the Union of Soviet Socialist Republics on the maritime boundary	Treaty was never ratified by either the Soviet Union or Russia
North Korea	Soviet Union	3 Sep 1990	Agreement between the Government of the Union of Soviet Socialist Republics and the Government of the Democratic People's Republic of Korea concerning the Regime of the Soviet–Korean State Frontier	Russia is a successor state to the treaty
Oman	Yemen	1 Oct 1992	International boundary agreement between the Sultanate of Oman and the Republic of Yemen	
India	Thailand	27 Oct 1993	Agreement between the Government of the Union of Myanmar, the Government of the Republic of India and the Government of the Kingdom of Thailand on the determination of the trijunction point between the three countries in the Andaman Sea	Trilateral treaty
Myanmar	Thailand	27 Oct 1993	Agreement between the Government of the Union of Myanmar, the Government of the Republic of India and the Government of the Kingdom of Thailand on the determination of the trijunction point between the three countries in the Andaman Sea	Trilateral treaty
Myanmar	India	27 Oct 1993	Agreement between the Government of the Union of Myanmar, the Government of the Republic of India and the Government of the Kingdom of Thailand on the determination of the trijunction point between the three countries in the Andaman Sea	Trilateral treaty
Malaysia	Singapore	26 Apr 1995	Agreement between the Government of Malaysia and the Government of the Republic of Singapore to Delimit Precisely the Territorial Waters Boundary in Accordance with the Straits Settlements and Johore Territorial Waters Agreement 1927	
Israel	Jordan	18 Jan 1996	Maritime Boundary Agreement between the Government of the State of Israel and the Government of the Hashemite Kingdom of Jordan	
Thailand	Vietnam	9 Aug 1997	Agreement between the Government of the Kingdom of Thailand and the Government of the Socialist Republic of Viet Nam on the delimitation of the maritime boundary between the two countries in the Gulf of Thailand	
Oman	Pakistan	12 Jun 2000	Muscat Agreement on the Delimitation of the Maritime Boundary between the Sultanate of Oman and the Islamic Republic of Pakistan	
Saudi Arabia	Yemen	12 Jun 2000	International Border Treaty between the Republic of Yemen and the Kingdom of Saudi Arabia	
Kuwait	Saudi Arabia	2 Jul 2000	Agreement between the Kingdom of Saudi Arabia and the State of Kuwait concerning the submerged area adjacent to the divided zone	
People's Republic of China	Vietnam	25 Dec 2000	Agreement between the People’s Republic of China and the Socialist Republic of Viet Nam on the delimitation of the territorial seas, the exclusive economic zones and continental shelves in Beibu Bay/Bac Bo Gulf	
Azerbaijan	Kazakhstan	29 Nov 2001	Boundary agreement between the Republic of Azerbaijan and the Republic of Kazakhstan	Includes delimitation of maritime boundaries
Azerbaijan	Russia	23 Sep 2002	Seabed Boundary Agreement between the Republic of Azerbaijan and the Russian Federation	
Azerbaijan	Kazakhstan	14 May 2003	Seabed Boundary Tripoint Agreement between the Republic of Azerbaijan, the Republic of Kazakhstan, and the Russian Federation	Trilateral treaty involving boundaries in the Caspian Sea
Azerbaijan	Russia	14 May 2003	Seabed Boundary Tripoint Agreement between the Republic of Azerbaijan, the Republic of Kazakhstan, and the Russian Federation	Trilateral treaty involving boundaries in the Caspian Sea
Kazakhstan	Russia	14 May 2003	Seabed Boundary Tripoint Agreement between the Republic of Azerbaijan, the Republic of Kazakhstan, and the Russian Federation	Trilateral treaty involving boundaries in the Caspian Sea
Indonesia	Vietnam	26 Jun 2003	Agreement between the Government of the Socialist Republic of Vietnam and the Government of the Republic of Indonesia concerning the delimitation of the continental shelf boundary	
Oman	Yemen	14 Dec 2003	Agreement on the delimitation of the maritime boundary between the Sultanate of Oman and the Republic of Yemen (with map)	
Jordan	Saudi Arabia	16 Dec 2007	Agreement on the delimitation of the maritime boundaries in the Gulf of Aqaba between the Kingdom of Saudi Arabia and the Hashemite Kingdom of Jordan (with map)	
Indonesia	Singapore	10 Mar 2009	Treaty between the Republic of Indonesia and the Republic of Singapore relating to the delimitation of the territorial seas of the two countries in the western part of the Strait of Singapore (with annexes)	
Israel	Cyprus	17 Dec 2010	Agreement between the Government of the State of Israel and the Government of the Republic of Cyprus on the delimitation of the exclusive economic zone (with annexes)	
Indonesia	Philippines	18 May 2014	Agreement between the Government of the Republic of Indonesia and the Government of the Republic of the Philippines concerning the delimitation of the exclusive economic zone boundary (with map)	Establishes the Indonesia–Philippines border; ratified by Indonesia in 2017 and by the Philippines in 2019

== Europe ==
Country 1	Country 2	Agreement date	Treaty name	Notes
Italy	Turkey	4 Jan 1932	Convention between Italy and Turkey (1932)	Greece is a successor state to the treaty
Denmark	Sweden	30 Jan 1932	Declaration between Sweden and Denmark concerning the boundaries of the Sund	
Norway	Soviet Union	29 Nov 1957	Descriptive Protocol relating to the sea frontier between Norway and the Union of Soviet Socialist Republics in the Varangerfjord, demarcated in 1957	Russia is a successor state to the treaty
Cyprus	Greece; Turkey; United Kingdom	16 Aug 1960	Treaty between the United Kingdom of Great Britain and Northern Ireland, the Kingdom of Greece, the Republic of Turkey and the Republic of Cyprus concerning the Establishment of the Republic of Cyprus	Granted Cyprus independence from the United Kingdom and established: 1. Cyprus – Greece boundary 2. Cyprus – Turkey boundary 3. Cyprus – Akrotiri and Dhekelia boundary
France	Monaco	18 May 1963	Exchange of letters on settlement of problems concerning the delimitation of Monegasque territorial waters constituting an agreement relating to article 4 of the Treaty of 17 July 1918 establishing the relations of France with the Principality of Monaco	
Norway	United Kingdom	10 Mar 1965	Agreement between the Government of the United Kingdom of Great Britain and Northern Ireland and the Government of the Kingdom of Norway relating to the delimitation of the continental shelf between the two countries	
Finland	Soviet Union	20 May 1965	Agreement between the Government of the Republic of Finland and the Government of the Union of Soviet Socialist Republics concerning the boundaries of sea areas and of the continental shelf in the Gulf of Finland	Russia is a successor state to the treaty
Denmark	West Germany	9 Jun 1965	1. Agreement between the Kingdom of Denmark and the Federal Republic of Germany concerning the delimitation, in the coastal regions, of the continental shelf of the North Sea; 2. Protocol to the Agreement between the Kingdom of Denmark and the Federal Republic of Germany concerning the delimitation, in the coastal regions, of the continental shelf of the North Sea	
Denmark	Norway	8 Dec 1965	Agreement between Denmark and Norway relating to the delimitation of the continental shelf	
Denmark	United Kingdom	3 Mar 1966	Agreement between the Government of the United Kingdom of Great Britain and Northern Ireland and the Government of the Kingdom of Denmark relating to the delimitation of the continental shelf between the two countries	
Denmark	Netherlands	31 Mar 1966	Agreement between the Government of the Kingdom of the Netherlands and the Government of the Kingdom of Denmark concerning the delimitation of the continental shelf under the North Sea between the two countries	
Norway	Sweden	5 Apr 1967	Agreement concerning the delimitation of the fishery areas of Norway and Sweden in the North-Eastern Skagerrak	
Finland	Soviet Union	5 May 1967	Agreement between the Government of the Republic of Finland and the Government of the Union of Soviet Socialist Republics concerning the boundary of the continental shelf between Finland and the Soviet Union in the north-eastern part of the Baltic Sea	Russia is a successor state to the treaty
Italy	Yugoslavia	8 Jan 1968	Agreement between Italy and Yugoslavia concerning the Delimitation of the Continental Shelf between the two Countries in the Adriatic Sea	Croatia, Montenegro, and Slovenia are successor states to the treaty
Norway	Sweden	27 Jul 1968	Agreement between Sweden and Norway concerning the delimitation of the continental shelf	
East Germany	Poland	29 Oct 1968	Treaty between the Polish People's Republic and the German Democratic Republic concerning the delimitation of the continental shelf in the Baltic Sea	Germany is a successor state to the treaty
Poland	Soviet Union	28 Aug 1969	Treaty between the Polish People's Republic and the Union of Soviet Socialist Republics concerning the boundary of the continental shelf in the Gulf of Gdansk and the south-eastern part of the Baltic Sea	Russia is a successor state to the treaty
Denmark	West Germany	22 and 28 Oct 1970	Exchange of notes constituting an agreement concerning the delimitation of the borderline between Denmark and the Federal Republic of Germany in the Flensborg Fiord area	
West Germany	Netherlands	28 Jan 1971	Treaty between the Kingdom of the Netherlands and the Federal Republic of Germany concerning the Delimitation of the Continental Shelf under the North Sea	
Denmark	West Germany	28 Jan 1971	Treaty between the Kingdom of Denmark and the Federal Republic of Germany concerning the delimitation of the continental shelf under the North Sea (with annexes and exchange of letters)	
Italy	Tunisia	20 Aug 1971	Agreement between the Government of the Republic of Tunisia and the Government of the Italian Republic concerning the Delimitation of the Continental Shelf between the two Countries	
West Germany	United Kingdom	25 Nov 1971	Agreement between the United Kingdom of Great Britain and Northern Ireland and the Federal Republic of Germany relating to the Delimitation of the Continental Shelf under the North Sea between the two Countries	
Netherlands	United Kingdom	25 Nov 1971	Protocol between the Government of the Kingdom of the Netherlands and the Government of the United Kingdom of Great Britain and Northern Ireland amending the Agreement of 6 October 1965 relating to the delimitation of the continental shelf under the North Sea between the two countries	
Denmark	United Kingdom	25 Nov 1971	Agreement between the Government of the Kingdom of Denmark and the Government of the United Kingdom of Great Britain and Northern Ireland relating to the delimitation of the continental shelf between the two countries	
Finland	Sweden	29 Sep 1972	Agreement between Sweden and Finland concerning the delimitation of the continental shelf in the Gulf of Bothnia, the Bothnian Sea, the Aland Sea and the northernmost part of the Baltic Sea	
Soviet Union	Turkey	17 Apr 1973	Protocol between the Government of the Union of Soviet Socialist Republics and the Government of the Republic of Turkey concerning the Establishment of the Maritime Boundary between Soviet and Turkish Territorial Waters in the Black Sea	Georgia, Russia, and Ukraine are successor states to the treaty
France	Spain	29 Jan 1974	Convention between the Government of the French Republic and the Government of the Spanish State on the Delimitation of the Continental Shelves of the two States in the Bay of Biscay (Golfe de Gascogne/Golfo de Vizcaya)	
Italy	Spain	19 Feb 1974	Convention between Spain and Italy on the Delimitation of the Continental Shelf between the two States	
West Germany	Netherlands	29 Sep 1975 and 24 Nov 1975	Exchange of notes constituting an agreement concerning delimitation of the frontier at the Molenbeek (Miihlenbach) and the Rammelbeek (Rammelbach) between the Netherlands and the Federal Republic of Germany	
Portugal	Spain	12 Feb 1976	1. Agreement between Portugal and Spain on the Delimitation of the Territorial Sea and Contiguous Zone; 2. Agreement between Portugal and Spain on the Continental Shelf	
Greece	Italy	24 May 1977	Agreement between the Hellenic Republic and the Italian Republic on the Delimitation of the Respective Continental Shelf Areas of the two States	
East Germany	Sweden	22 Jun 1978	Treaty between the German Democratic Republic and the Kingdom of Sweden on the Delimitation of the Continental Shelf (with Protocol)	Germany is a successor state to the treaty
Soviet Union	Turkey	23 Jun 1978	Agreement between the Government of the Republic of Turkey and the Government of the Union of Soviet Socialist Republics concerning the Delimitation of the Continental Shelf Between the Republic of Turkey and the Union of Soviet Socialist Republics in the Black Sea	Georgia, Russia, and Ukraine are successor states to the treaty
Norway	United Kingdom	22 Dec 1978	Protocol supplementary to the Agreement of 10 March 1965 between the Government of the United Kingdom of Great Britain and Northern Ireland and the Government of the Kingdom of Norway relating to the delimitation of the continental shelf between the two countries	
Denmark	Norway	15 Jun 1979	Agreement between the Government of the Kingdom of Denmark and the Government of the Kingdom of Norway concerning the Delimitation of the Continental Shelf in the Area between the Faroe Islands and Norway and concerning the Boundary between the Fishery Zone near the Faroe Islands and the Norwegian Economic Zone	Establishes Faroe Islands – Norway border
Denmark	Sweden	25 Jun 1979	Exchange of notes constituting an agreement between Denmark and Sweden concerning the delimitation of the territorial waters between Denmark and Sweden	
Finland	Soviet Union	25 Feb 1980	Agreement between the Government of the Republic of Finland and the Government of the Union of Soviet Socialist Republics regarding the delimitation of the areas of Finnish and Soviet jurisdiction in the field of fishing in the Gulf of Finland and the North-eastern Part of the Baltic Sea	Russia is a successor state to the treaty
Iceland	Norway	28 May 1980	Agreement between Norway and Iceland concerning Fishery and Continental Shelf Questions	Establishes Iceland – Jan Mayen boundary
France	United Kingdom	24 Jun 1982	Agreement between the Government of the French Republic and the Government of the United Kingdom of Great Britain and Northern Ireland relating to the Delimitation of the Continental Shelf in the Area East of 30 Minutes West of the Greenwich Meridian	
France	Monaco	17 Feb 1984	Convention on Maritime Delimitation between the Government of His Most Serene Highness the Prince of Monaco and the Government of the French Republic	
Denmark	Sweden	9 Nov 1984	Agreement concerning the delimitation of the continental shelf and fishing zones	
France	Spain	31 Jan 1985 and 7 Feb 1985	Exchange of letters constituting an agreement amending Annex V of the Convention of 28 December 1858 supplementary to the Treaty on delimitation of 2 December 1856 delimiting the frontier from the mouth of the Bidassoa to the point where the department of Basses-Pyrénées adjoins Aragon and Navarre	
Finland	Soviet Union	5 Feb 1985	Agreement between the Government of the Republic of Finland and the Government of the Union of Soviet Socialist Republics regarding the delimitation of the economic zone, the fishing zone and the continental shelf in the gulf of Finland and in the North-Eastern part of the Baltic Sea	Russia is a successor state to the treaty
Malta	Libya	10 Nov 1986	Agreement between the Great Socialist People's Libyan Arab Jamahariya and the Republic of Malta implementing Article III of the Special Agreement and the Judgment of the International Court of Justice	
France	Italy	28 Nov 1986	Agreement between the Government of the French Republic and the Government of the Italian Republic on the Delimitation of the Maritime Boundaries in the Area of the Strait of Bonifacio	Establishes boundary between Corsica and Sardinia
Soviet Union	Turkey	23 Dec 1986 and 6 Feb 1987	Exchange of notes constituting an agreement on the delimitation of the USSR and Turkey economic zone in the Black Sea	Georgia, Russia, and Ukraine are succeeding parties to the agreement
France	Spain	22 Sep 1987 and 10 Jun 1988	Exchange of letters constituting an agreement between France and Spain amending Annex V of the Convention of 28 December 1858 supplementary to the Treaty on delimitation of 2 December 1856 delimiting the frontier from the mouth of the Bidassoa to the point where the department of Basses-Pyrénées adjoins Aragon and Navarre	
Soviet Union	Sweden	13 Jan 1988	Agreement on principles for the delimitation of the sea areas in the Baltic Sea between the Kingdom of Sweden and the Union of Soviet Socialist Republics	Russia is a successor state to the treaty
Soviet Union	Sweden	18 Apr 1988	Agreement between the Government of the Kingdom of Sweden and the Government of the Union of Soviet Socialist Republics concerning the delimitation of the continental shelf and of the Swedish fishing zone and the Soviet economic zone in the Baltic Sea	Russia is a successor state to the treaty
Denmark	East Germany	14 Sep 1988	Treaty between the German Democratic Republic and the Kingdom of Denmark on the Delimitation of the Continental Shelf and the Fishery Zones	Germany is a successor state to the treaty
Ireland	United Kingdom	7 Nov 1988	1. Agreement between the Government of the United Kingdom of Great Britain and Northern Ireland and the Government of the Republic of Ireland concerning the delimitation of areas of the continental shelf between the two countries 2. Protocol supplementary to the agreement between the Government of Ireland and the Government of the United Kingdom concerning the delimitation of areas of the continental shelf between the two countries	
Poland	Sweden	10 Feb 1989	Agreement concerning the Delimitation of the Continental Shelf and Fishing Zones between the Kingdom of Sweden and the Polish People's Republic	
East Germany	Poland	22 May 1989	Treaty between the German Democratic Republic and the Polish People's Republic on the Delimitation of the Sea Areas in the Oder Bay	Germany is a successor state to the treaty
Poland	Soviet Union	30 Jun 1989	Agreement between the Government of the Kingdom of Sweden, the Government of the Polish People’s Republic and the Government of the USSR concerning the Common Delimitation Point of their Maritime Boundaries in the Baltic Sea	Trilateral treaty Estonia, Latvia, Lithuania, and Russia are successor states to the treaty
Poland	Sweden	30 Jun 1989	Agreement between the Government of the Kingdom of Sweden, the Government of the Polish People’s Republic and the Government of the USSR concerning the Common Delimitation Point of their Maritime Boundaries in the Baltic Sea	Trilateral treaty Estonia, Latvia, Lithuania, and Russia are successor states to the treaty
Soviet Union	Sweden	30 Jun 1989	Agreement between the Government of the Kingdom of Sweden, the Government of the Polish People’s Republic and the Government of the USSR concerning the Common Delimitation Point of their Maritime Boundaries in the Baltic Sea	Trilateral treaty Estonia, Latvia, Lithuania, and Russia are successor states to the treaty
Belgium	France	8 Oct 1990	1. Agreement between the Government of the French Republic and the Government of the Kingdom of Belgium on the delimitation of the territorial sea 2. Agreement between the Government of the French Republic and the Government of the Kingdom of Belgium on the delimitation of the continental shelf	
Germany	Poland	14 Nov 1990	Treaty between the Federal Republic of Germany and the Republic of Poland on the confirmation of the frontier between them	
Belgium	United Kingdom	29 May 1991	Agreement between the Government of the United Kingdom of Great Britain and Northern Ireland and the Government of the Kingdom of Belgium relating to the delimitation of the continental shelf between the two countries	
France	United Kingdom	23 Jul 1991	Agreement between the Government of the French Republic and the Government of the United Kingdom of Great Britain and Northern Ireland relating to the completion of the delimitation of the continental shelf in the southern North Sea	
Norway	Russia	8 Mar 1992	Joint Protocol on Working Program for the development of contacts and cooperation between the Russian Federation and Norway	
Albania	Italy	18 Dec 1992	Agreement between Albania and Italy for the determination of the continental shelf of each of the two countries	
Finland	Sweden	2 Jun 1994	Agreement between the Republic of Finland and the Kingdom of Sweden on the Delimitation of the Boundary between the Continental Shelf and Fishery Zone of Finland and the Economic Zone of Sweden in the Aland Sea and the Northern Baltic Sea	
Bosnia and Herzegovina	Croatia	14 Dec 1995	Treaty on the State Border between the Republic of Croatia and Bosnia and Herzegovina	Establishes land and maritime boundaries between the countries
Denmark	Norway	18 Dec 1995	Agreement between the Kingdom of Denmark and the Kingdom of Norway concerning the Delimitation of the Continental Shelf in the Area between Jan Mayen and Greenland and concerning the Boundary between the Fishery Zones in the Area	Establishes Greenland – Jan Mayen boundary
Estonia	Latvia	12 July 1996	1. Agreement between the Republic of Estonia and the Republic of Latvia on the Maritime Delimitation in the Gulf of Riga, the Strait of Irbe and the Baltic Sea; 2. Protocol to the Agreement between the Republic of Estonia and the Republic of Latvia on the Maritime Delimitation in the Gulf of Riga, the Strait of Irbe and the Baltic Sea, 12 July 1996, between the Prime Minister of the Republic of Estonia and the Minister President of the Republic of Latvia	
Estonia	Finland	18 Oct 1996	Agreement between the Republic of Finland and the Republic of Estonia on the Boundary of the Maritime Zones in the Gulf of Finland and on the Northern Baltic Sea	
Belgium	Netherlands	18 Dec 1996	1. Treaty between the Kingdom of the Netherlands and the Kingdom of Belgium on the Delimitation of the Continental Shelf; 2. Treaty between the Kingdom of the Netherlands and the Kingdom of Belgium on the Delimitation of the Territorial Sea	
Estonia	Latvia	30 Apr 1997	Agreement between the Government of the Republic of Estonia, the Government of the Republic of Latvia and the Government of the Kingdom of Sweden on the Common Maritime Boundary Point in the Baltic Sea	Trilateral treaty
Estonia	Sweden	30 Apr 1997	Agreement between the Government of the Republic of Estonia, the Government of the Republic of Latvia and the Government of the Kingdom of Sweden on the Common Maritime Boundary Point in the Baltic Sea	Trilateral treaty
Latvia	Sweden	30 Apr 1997	Agreement between the Government of the Republic of Estonia, the Government of the Republic of Latvia and the Government of the Kingdom of Sweden on the Common Maritime Boundary Point in the Baltic Sea	Trilateral treaty
Georgia	Turkey	14 Jul 1997	Protocol between the Government of the Republic of Turkey and the Government of Georgia on the Confirmation of the Maritime Boundaries between them in the Black Sea	
Lithuania	Russia	24 Jul 1997	Treaty between the Republic of Lithuania and the Russian Federation on the Delimitation of the Exclusive Economic Zone and the Continental Shelf in the Baltic Sea	
Denmark	Iceland	11 Nov 1997	Agreement between the Government of the Kingdom of Denmark along with the Local Government of Greenland on the one hand, and the Government of the Republic of Iceland on the other hand on the Delimitation of the Continental Shelf and the Fishery Zone in the Area between Greenland and Iceland	Establishes Greenland – Iceland boundary
Iceland	Norway	11 Nov 1997	Additional Protocol to the Agreement of 28 May 1980 between Norway and Iceland concerning Fishery and Continental Shelf Questions and the Agreement derived therefrom of 22 October 1981 on the Continental Shelf between Jan Mayen and Iceland	Establishes Iceland – Jan Mayen boundary
Bulgaria	Turkey	4 Dec 1997	Agreement between the Republic of Turkey and the Republic of Bulgaria on determination of the boundary in the mouth area of the Mutludere/Rezovska river and delimitation of the maritime areas between the two states in the Black Sea	
Estonia	Sweden	2 Nov 1998	Agreement between the Government of the Republic of Estonia and the Government of the Kingdom of Sweden on the Delimitation of the Maritime Zones in the Baltic Sea	
Denmark	United Kingdom	18 May 1999	Agreement between the Government of the Kingdom of Denmark together with the Home Government of the Faroe Islands, on the one hand, and the Government of the United Kingdom of Great Britain and Northern Ireland, on the other hand, relating to Maritime Delimitation in the Area between the Faroe Islands and the United Kingdom	Establishes Faroe Islands – United Kingdom boundary
Bosnia and Herzegovina	Croatia	30 Jun 1999	Treaty on the State Border between the Republic of Croatia and Bosnia and Herzegovina	
Latvia	Lithuania	9 Jul 1999	Agreement between the Republic of Latvia and the Republic of Lithuania on the Delimitation of the Territorial Sea, Exclusive Economic Zone and Continental Shelf in the Baltic Sea	
France	United Kingdom	4 Jul 2000	Agreement between the United Kingdom of Great Britain and Northern Ireland and the French Republic concerning the establishment of a maritime boundary between France and Jersey	
Estonia	Finland	16 Jan 2001	Agreement between the Government of the Republic of Finland, the Government of the Republic of Estonia and the Government of the Kingdom of Sweden on the common maritime boundary point in the Baltic Sea	Trilateral treaty
Estonia	Sweden	16 Jan 2001	Agreement between the Government of the Republic of Finland, the Government of the Republic of Estonia and the Government of the Kingdom of Sweden on the common maritime boundary point in the Baltic Sea	Trilateral treaty
Finland	Sweden	16 Jan 2001	Agreement between the Government of the Republic of Finland, the Government of the Republic of Estonia and the Government of the Kingdom of Sweden on the common maritime boundary point in the Baltic Sea	Trilateral treaty
Ireland	United Kingdom	18–31 Oct 2001	Exchange of Notes between the Government of Ireland and the Government of the United Kingdom of Great Britain and Northern Ireland constituting an agreement pursuant to Article 83 paragraph 3 of the United Nations Convention on the Law of the Sea 1982 on the provisional delimitation of an area of the continental shelf	
Cyprus	Egypt	17 Feb 2003	Agreement between the Republic of Cyprus and the Arab Republic of Egypt on the Delimitation of the Exclusive Economic Zone	
Romania	Ukraine	17 Jun 2003	Treaty between Romania and Ukraine on the Romanian–Ukrainian State Border Regime, Collaboration, and Mutual Assistance on Border Matters	Partially amends the agreed-to maritime boundary between the two states.
Denmark	Norway	20 Feb 2006	Agreement between the Government of the Kingdom of Norway on the one hand, and the Government of the Kingdom of Denmark together with the Home Rule Government of Greenland on the other hand, concerning the delimitation of the continental shelf and the fisheries zones in the area between Greenland and Svalbard	Establishes Greenland – Svalbard boundary
Norway	Russia	11 Jul 2007	Agreement between the Russian Federation and the Kingdom of Norway on the maritime delimitation in the Varangerfjord area (with map)	
Norway	Russia	15 Sep 2010	Agreement between the Government of the Kingdom of Norway on the one hand, and the Government of the Republic of Russia on the other hand, concerning the delimitation of the continental shelf and the fisheries zones in the Barents Sea.	The agreement settles on a compromise between the median line favoured by Norway, and the meridian based sector favoured by Russia.
Cyprus	Israel	17 Dec 2010	Agreement between the Government of the State of Israel and the Government of the Republic of Cyprus on the delimitation of the exclusive economic zone (with annexes)	
Greece	Italy	2 Jun 2020	Agreement between Greece and Italy on the delimitation of the exclusive economic zone	
Greece	Egypt	6 Aug 2020	Agreement between Greece and Egypt on the partial delimitation of the exclusive economic zone	

== Oceania ==
Country 1	Country 2	Agreement date	Treaty name	Notes
Australia	Papua New Guinea	18 Dec 1978	Treaty between Australia and the Independent State of Papua New Guinea concerning sovereignty and maritime boundaries in the area between the two countries, including the area known as Torres Strait, and related matters	
France	Tonga	11 Jan 1980	Convention between the Government of the French Republic and the Government of the Kingdom of Tonga on the delimitation of economic zones	Establishes Wallis and Futuna – Tonga boundary
Cook Islands	United States	11 Jun 1980	Treaty between the United States of America and the Cook Islands on friendship and delimitation of the maritime boundary between the United States of America and the Cook Islands	Establishes Cook Islands – American Samoa border
New Zealand	United States	2 Dec 1980	Treaty Between the United States of America and New Zealand on the Delimitation of the Maritime Boundary Between Tokelau and the United States of America	Establishes Tokelau – American Samoa boundary
Papua New Guinea	Indonesia	13 Dec 1980	Agreement between the Government of Indonesia and the Government of Papua New Guinea Concerning the Maritime Boundary between the Republic of Indonesia and Papua New Guinea and Cooperation on related Matters	
Australia	France	4 Jan 1982	Agreement on Marine Delimitation between the Government of Australia and the Government of the French Republic	Establishes: 1. Australia – New Caledonia boundary 2.Norfolk Island – New Caledonia boundary 3. (French Southern and Antarctic Lands) Kerguelen Island – Heard and McDonald Islands boundary
Fiji	France	19 Jan 1983	Agreement between the Government of the Republic of France and the Government of Fiji relating to the Delimitation of their Economic Zone	Establishes: 1. Fiji – New Caledonia boundary 2. Fiji – Wallis and Futuna boundary
France	United Kingdom	25 Oct 1983	Convention on Maritime Boundaries between the Government of the French Republic and the Government of the United Kingdom of Great Britain and Northern Ireland	Establishes French Polynesia – Pitcairn Islands boundary
France	Tuvalu	6 Aug 1985 to 5 Nov 1985	Exchange of notes between the Ministry of Foreign Affairs of the Government of Tuvalu and the French Embassy in Suva constituting an Agreement concerning provisional maritime delimitation between the two countries	Establishes provisional Wallis and Futuna – Tuvalu boundary
Australia	Solomon Islands	13 Sep 1988	Agreement between the Government of Australia and the Government of Solomon Islands establishing certain sea and seabed boundaries	
Papua New Guinea	Solomon Islands	25 Jan 1989	Treaty between the Independent State of Papua New Guinea and Solomon Islands Concerning Sovereignty, Maritime and Seabed Boundaries between the Two Countries, and Cooperation on Related Matters	
Australia	Indonesia	11 Dec 1989	Treaty between Australia and the Republic of Indonesia on the zone of cooperation in an area between the Indonesian province of East Timor and Northern Australia	no longer in force
Cook Islands	France	3 Aug 1990	Agreement on Maritime Delimitation between the Government of the Cook Islands and the Government of the French Republic	Establishes Cook Islands – French Polynesia boundary
France	Solomon Islands	12 Nov 1990	Agreement on maritime delimitation between the Government of the French Republic and the Government of the Solomon Islands	Establishes New Caledonia – Solomon Islands boundary
Australia	Indonesia	14 Mar 1997	Treaty between the Government of Australia and the Government of the Republic of Indonesia establishing an exclusive economic zone boundary and certain seabed boundaries	Establishes: 1. Australia – Indonesia boundary Christmas Island – Indonesia boundary
Niue	United States	13 May 1997	Treaty between the Government of the United States of America and the Government of Niue on the delimitation of a maritime boundary	Establishes Niue – American Samoa boundary
Australia	East Timor	20 May 2002 (backdated)	Timor Sea Treaty between the Government of East Timor and the Government of Australia	
France	Kiribati	18 Dec 2002	Agreement between the Government of the French Republic and the Government of the Republic of Kiribati concerning the Delimitation of a Boundary Line between the Exclusive Economic Zone around French Polynesia and the Exclusive Economic Zone of the Republic of Kiribati	Establishes Kiribati – (France) French Polynesia boundary
France	New Zealand	30 Jun 2003	Agreement between the Government of the French Republic and the Government of New Zealand concerning the delimitation of the maritime boundaries between Wallis and Futuna and Tokelau (with map)	Establishes Tokelau – Wallis and Futuna boundary
Australia	New Zealand	25 Jul 2004	Treaty between the Government of Australia and the Government of New Zealand establishing certain Exclusive Economic Zone and Continental Shelf Boundaries	
Federated States of Micronesia	Palau	2006	Treaty between the Federated States of Micronesia and the Republic of Palau concerning Maritime Boundaries and Cooperation on Related matters	
Marshall Islands	Federated States of Micronesia	5 Jul 2006	Treaty between the Federated States of Micronesia and the Republic of the Marshall Islands concerning Maritime Boundaries and Cooperation on Related matters	

== See also ==
- List of countries and territories by maritime boundaries
