= Borders of the United States =

Political boundaries between the United States and neighboring territories

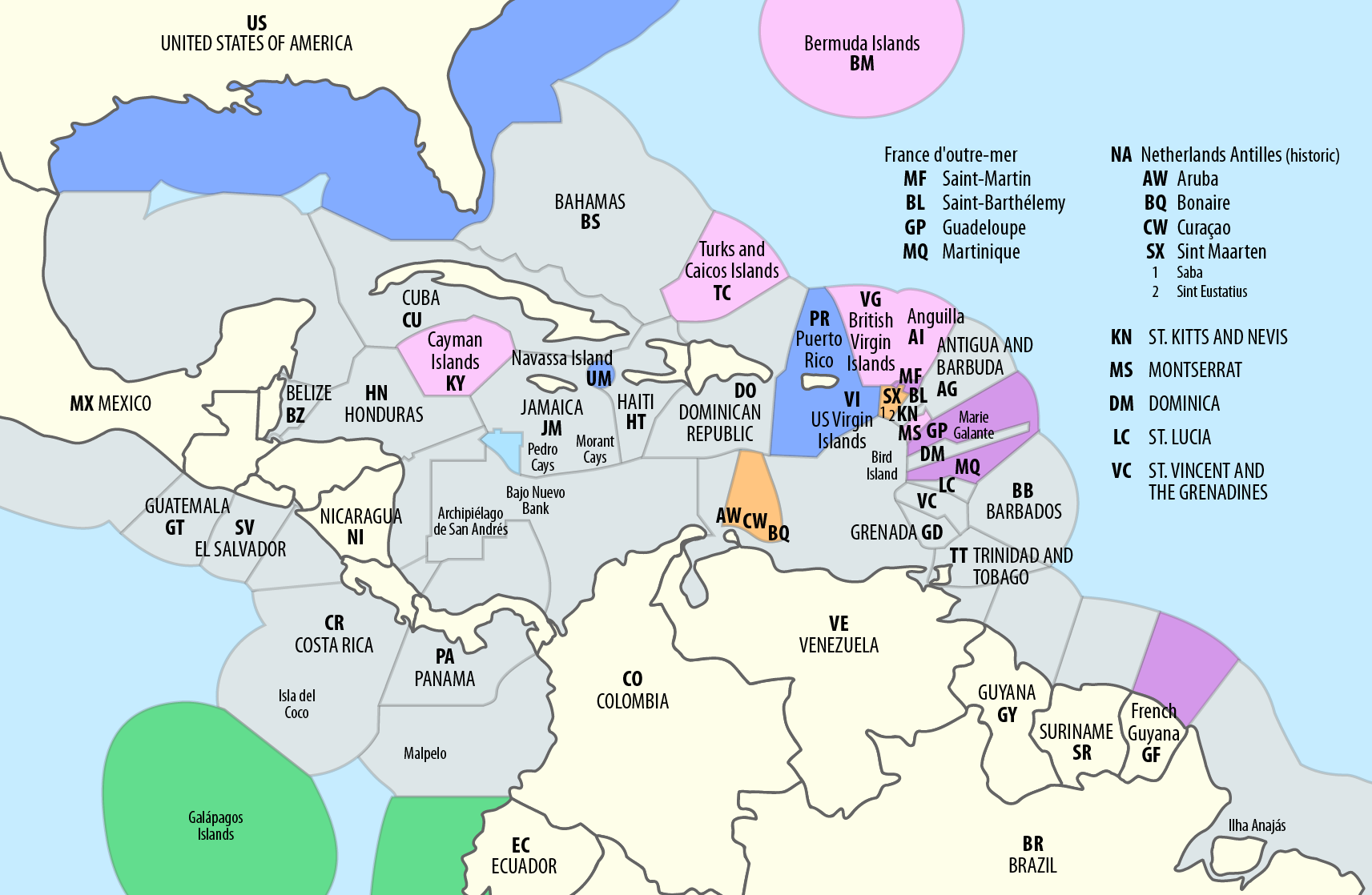
Exclusive economic zone maritime boundaries in the Caribbean Sea and equatorial Atlantic Ocean

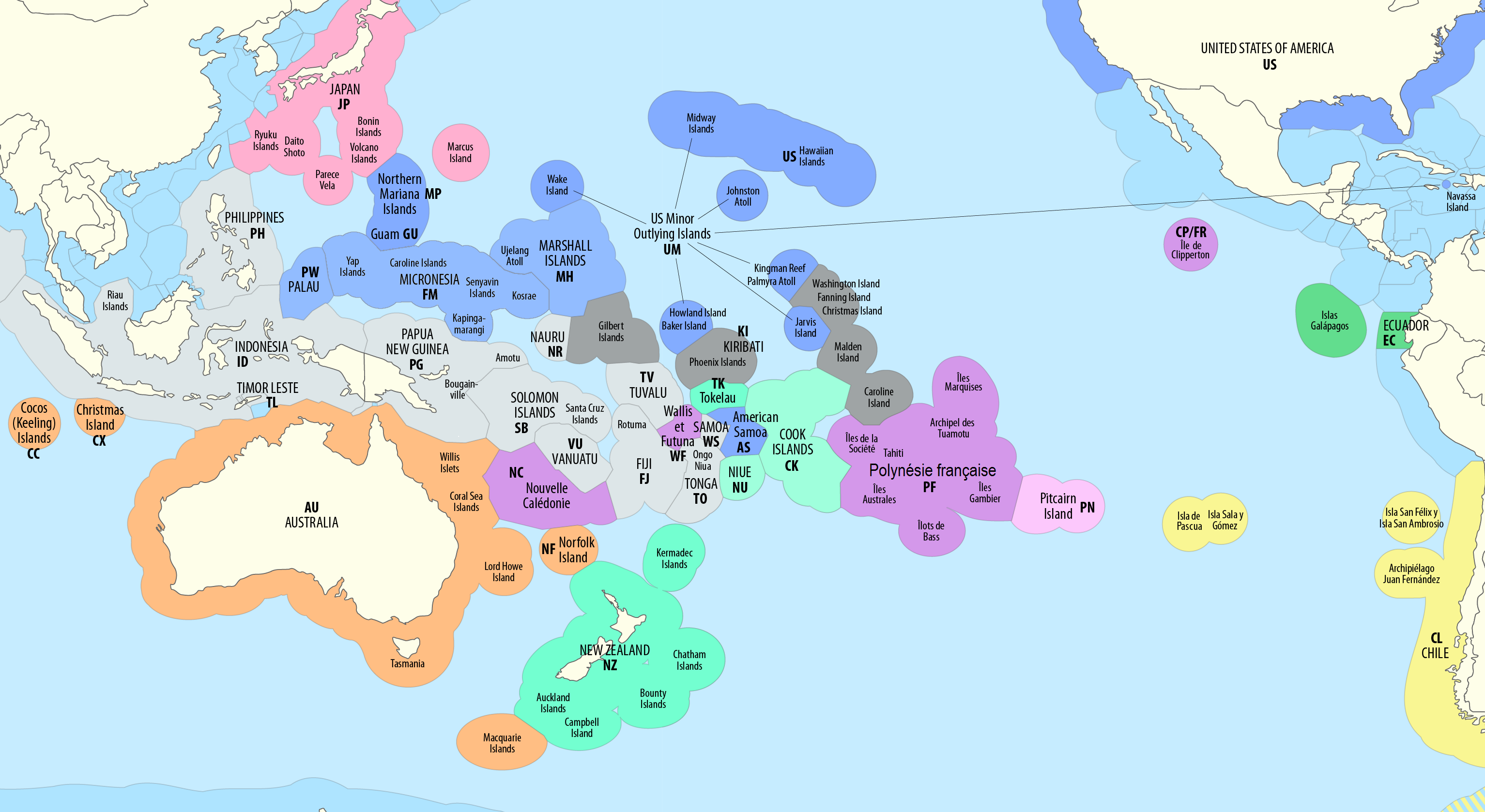
EEZ maritime boundaries in the Pacific Ocean

The United States has land borders with Canada to the North and Mexico to the South and a maritime and in the winter an ice border via the Diomede Islands with Russia to the West, as well as maritime boundaries with several much smaller countries of the diverse exclusive economic zone of the United States (EEZ).

All of the United States maritime borders with Canada are at least partially disputed, and its territorial claims on three Caribbean islands are disputed.

== List ==
Maritime borders that are not delineated by bilateral treaty are defined by United States acceptance of the United Nations Convention on the Law of the Sea (UNCLOS), which includes the convention's exclusive economic zone boundary definitions but does not extend to mineral rights in international waters. United States Minor Outlying Islands (USMOI) are mostly uninhabited, unorganized, and unincorporated.

Part of the United States	Foreign entity	Type	Notes
Contiguous United States	Mexico	Land, near-shore, and EEZ	Mexico–United States border, including Pacific Ocean and Gulf of Mexico. Land boundaries defined by the 1819 Adams–Onís Treaty (with Spain), 1828 Treaty of Limits, 1848 Treaty of Guadalupe Hidalgo, 1854 Gadsden Purchase, and Boundary Treaty of 1970. Ocean boundaries defined by bilateral treaties in 1970, 1978, and 2001.
Contiguous United States	Canada	Land, near-shore, and EEZ	Canada–United States border - Partially disputed in the Atlantic Ocean (Maine-New Brunswick) and Pacific Ocean (Washington State-British Columbia). Passamaquoddy Bay border defined by 1910 treaty. Gulf of Maine partial border defined by 1984 ruling of the International Court of Justice. Land and Great Lakes border defined by the 1783 Treaty of Paris, 1794 Jay Treaty, Treaty of 1818, 1842 Webster–Ashburton Treaty and 1846 Oregon Treaty (all with the United Kingdom).
Alaska	Canada	Land, near-shore, and EEZ	Canada–United States border - disputed in the Arctic Ocean (Yukon) and Pacific Ocean (British Columbia). Land border defined by Anglo-Russian Convention of 1825, and 1903 Hay–Herbert Treaty (with the United Kingdom).
Alaska	Russia	EEZ	The de facto boundary between the United States and Russia is defined by the USSR–USA Maritime Boundary Agreement, negotiated with the Soviet Union in 1990, covering the Bering Sea, Bering Strait, and Arctic Ocean. The agreement was never ratified by the Soviet Union before it dissolved, and it has never been ratified by the Russian State Duma. It has been ratified by the United States Senate, respected in practices by both governments, and defended against encroachment by fishing vessels. The boundary line generally follows the line agreed to during the 1867 Alaska Purchase, though this could not be entirely determined because neither country could produce maps agreed to at that time.
Contiguous United States	Bahamas	EEZ, Atlantic Ocean	UNCLOS
Contiguous United States	Cuba	EEZ, Gulf of Mexico	1977 Cuba–United States Maritime Boundary Agreement
Puerto Rico and United States Virgin Islands	Dominican Republic, British Virgin Islands and Anguilla (dependencies of the United Kingdom), Saba (special municipality of the Netherlands), Venezuela	EEZ, Caribbean Sea	1993 United Kingdom–United States Maritime Boundary Treaties, 1980 United States–Venezuela Maritime Boundary Treaty, others UNCLOS
Northern Mariana Islands	Japan (Volcano Islands)	EEZ, Pacific Ocean	UNCLOS
Guam	Federated States of Micronesia (freely associated state)	EEZ, Pacific Ocean	Defined by 2019 treaty.
American Samoa	Tonga, Samoa, and New Zealand dependencies: Cook Islands, Niue, and Tokelau	EEZ, Pacific Ocean	Cook Islands and Tokelau borders defined by three treaties in 1980, 1980, and 1997, respectively; others UNCLOS
Baker Island and Howland Island, Johnston Atoll and Kingman Reef, and Jarvis Island (USMOI)	Kiribati (three discontinuous extents)	EEZ, Pacific Ocean	Defined by 2019 treaty.
Wake Island (disputed USMOI)	Marshall Islands (freely associated state)	EEZ, Pacific Ocean	Claimed by Marshall Islands, administered by the United States
Bajo Nuevo Bank and Serranilla Bank (disputed USMOI)	Colombia, Jamaica, Honduras, Nicaragua	EEZ, Caribbean Sea	Claimed by Colombia (other neighbors recognize Colombian claim)
Navassa Island (disputed USMOI)	Jamaica, Haiti, Cuba	EEZ, Caribbean Sea	Claimed by Haiti

== Customs territories ==
Insular areas in the Pacific and the U.S. Virgin Islands are not included in the main domestic customs territory which is limited to the 50 states, the District of Columbia, and Puerto Rico.

== Border disputes ==
- Canada
  - New Brunswick-Maine maritime border and islands: While the 1984 Gulf of Maine Case submitted to the International Court of Justice established most of Atlantic maritime boundary between the United States and Canada, the parties agreed to exclude from that case Machias Seal Island and North Rock and nearby portions of the maritime boundary. This created a "grey zone" of overlapping claims near the disputed islands (and has contributed to "grey-zone conflict"). Machias Seal Island is occupied by Canada, and the disputed waters are patrolled by both nations. The strength of near-shore maritime claims depend on how the island sovereignty dispute is resolved.
  - Strait of Juan de Fuca between Washington State and British Columbia
  - Beaufort Sea - Yukon–Alaska dispute
  - Dixon Entrance, southern Alaska and coastal British Columbia - Dispute stems from the ambiguity of the Hay–Herbert Treaty in 1903 between the United States and the United Kingdom signed to settle the Alaska boundary dispute, an agreement opposed by Canadian leaders.
- Haiti
  - Navassa Island - The US claimed the Navassa island via the Guano Islands Act of 1856. Haiti claimed sovereignty over the island in 1801, but was occupied by the US through gunboat diplomacy.
- Colombia
  - Bajo Nuevo Bank - Administered by Colombia, claimed by the US as an unorganized, unincorporated territory.
  - Serranilla Bank - Administered by Colombia, claimed by the US as an unorganized, unincorporated territory.
- Tokelau
  - Swains Island has been administered by the United States as part of American Samoa since 1925. New Zealand, of which Tokelau is a dependency, recognized U.S. sovereignty in a 1980 treaty. The uninhabited island was claimed for Tokelau in the constitution that was almost adopted in the 2006 Tokelauan self-determination referendum.

== Disputed occupation ==
The United States administers Guantanamo Bay Naval Base on what both countries agree is the sovereign territory of Cuba under a permanent lease obtained under the Cuban–American Treaty of Relations (1903), while Cuba was under American military occupation after the 1898 Spanish–American War. After the Cuban Revolution in the 1950s, Cuba disputed the validity of this lease and ceased cooperating with the base. The boundary is highly militarized, but the United States has maintained control without active fighting.

== Enforcement ==
Three agencies in the federal Department of Homeland Security split border-related responsibilities. U.S. Customs and Border Protection staffs official border checkpoints, collects tariff duties, and inspects arriving people, and inspects goods being imported by land, sea, and air. U.S. Immigration and Customs Enforcement polices borders away from official points of entry. United States Citizenship and Immigration Services administers immigration procedures.

The United States Coast Guard actively patrols the nation's extensive maritime borders, acting as a law enforcement agency in peacetime. The United States Armed Forces are generally prohibited from domestic law enforcement (including arresting smugglers and illegal immigrants) under the Posse Comitatus Act, but can be activated to secure the border in an emergency or respond to an attack. State and federal National Guard troops and even active-duty military personnel have been used in support roles at the border, which has been controversial and limited by legal complexities.

The border search exception to the guarantees in the Fourth Amendment to the United States Constitution against unreasonable search and seizure and requirement for search warrants apply to border checkpoints and areas within 100 miles (160 km) of the border.

== See also ==
- Border irregularities of the United States
- Border irregularities of Canada
