= Straits of Florida =

Strait between Florida, U.S. and Cuba

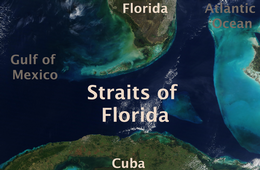
- Florida Straits from space

- Location within the Caribbean

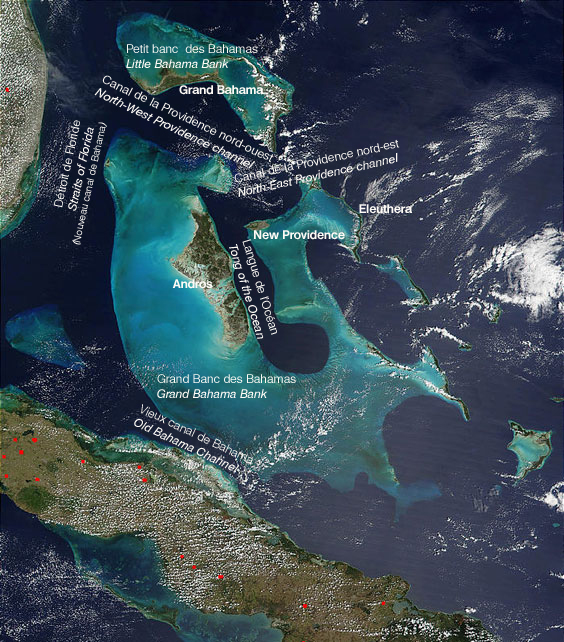
- Straits and channels around the Bahama Islands.
- Coordinates: 24°00′00″N 80°50′00″W
- Max. width: 150 kilometres (93 mi)
- Average depth: 1,800 metres (5,900 ft)

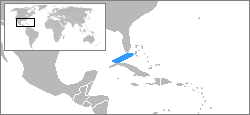
The Straits of Florida

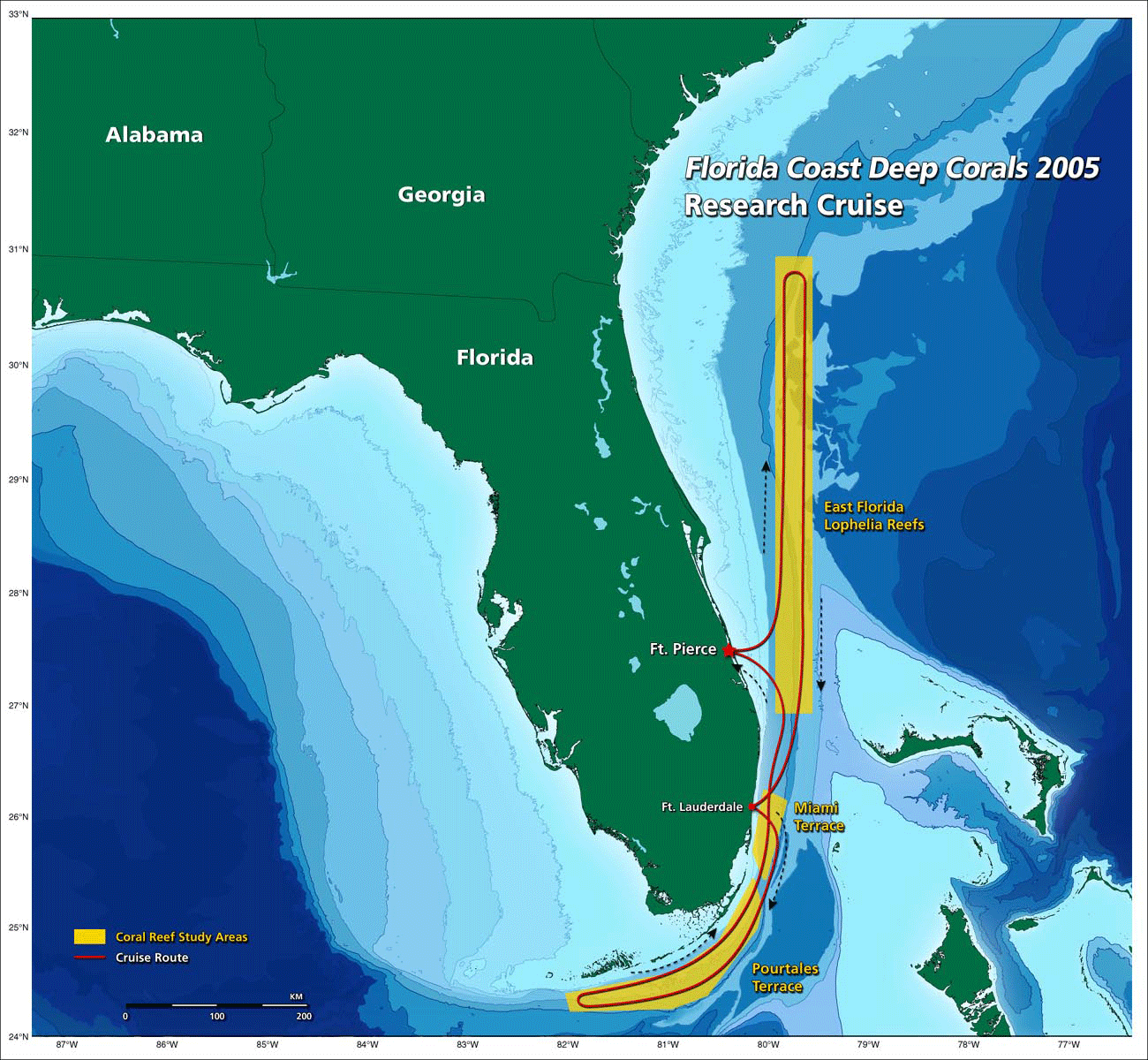
The Florida straits, the J-shaped channel between southeastern Florida and the Bahamas, and the Florida Keys and Cuba.

The Straits of Florida, Florida Straits, or Florida Strait (Spanish: Estrecho de Florida) is a strait located south-southeast of the North American mainland, generally accepted to be between the Gulf of Mexico and the Atlantic Ocean, and between the Florida Keys (U.S.) and Cuba. It is 93 mi (150 km) wide at the narrowest point between Key West and the Cuban shore, and has been sounded to a depth of 6,000 feet (1,800 m). The strait carries the Florida Current, the beginning of the Gulf Stream, from the Gulf of Mexico.

== Oil and gas ==
Five wells were drilled in state waters south of the Florida Keys from 1947 to 1962. Gulf Oil drilled three wells in federal waters south of the Florida Keys in 1960 and 1961. All the wells were dry holes.

The boundary between the Exclusive Economic Zones of the US and Cuba is halfway between Cuba and Florida, as determined by the 1977 Cuba–United States Maritime Boundary Agreement.

=== Offshore Cuba ===
Cuba has three producing offshore oil fields within 5 km of its north coast opposite Florida. The US Geological Survey estimates that the North Cuba Basin contains 5,500,000,000 barrels (870,000,000 m^{3}) of undiscovered petroleum liquids and 9.8 trillion cubic feet of natural gas, almost all in the offshore part of the basin.

The issue of allowing oil and gas exploration offshore Florida became a hotly contested topic in the 2008 US elections. In a column published 5 June 2008, syndicated columnist George Will wrote that a Chinese oil company was then drilling in Cuban waters 60 miles (97 km) from the Florida coast, a claim that was repeated by candidates in favor of offshore drilling. In fact, no drilling was then taking place in that part of Cuban waters.

In 2004 the Spanish oil company Repsol drilled in deep Cuban waters between Cuba and the Florida Keys, and found an oil deposit; the deposit was judged noncommercial, and the hole was plugged. In October 2008, Cuba signed an agreement with the Brazilian state oil company Petrobras, which provides for Petrobras to drill for oil and gas in deep waters off the north shore of Cuba. In July 2009, Cuba signed an agreement with the Russian government giving the Russian oil company Zarubezhneft oil exploration rights off the north shore of Cuba. By May 2011 Petrobras had withdrawn from the 2008 agreement due to poor prospects.

=== Offshore Bahamas ===
In 2009 the Falkland Islands-registered company Bharat Petroleum Company Ltd. and Norwegian company Statoil announced a joint venture to drill for oil in Bahamian waters north of Cuba and southeast of Florida. The government of the Bahamas has indicated that applications for offshore drilling are on hold pending negotiations with Cuba, the United States, and the Turks and Caicos Islands on the exact boundaries between their respective Exclusive Economic Zones.

== Currents ==
The Gulf Stream is a significant ocean current, it transports an immense volume of seawater, along with heat, carbon, and various other oceanic elements. As a result, the Gulf Stream plays a vital role in shaping weather and climate, affecting phenomena as diverse as sea level along Florida's coastline and temperature and precipitation patterns across continental Europe. Recent studies have shown that climate variability in the tropical Pacific can influence the Florida Current. Changes in equatorial Pacific wind and ocean conditions are transmitted through large-scale, ocean-atmosphere connections, shifting the transport strength of the current in the Straits of Florida. The Gulf Stream has also been studied as a potential renewable energy resource. A thirty-year high-resolution simulation demonstrated consistent energy flow in the Straits, suggesting the region could be a site for marine energy research. On shorter timescales, the current exhibits sub-seasonal variability. Wind stress and boundary interactions cause fluctuations over weeks to months, making transport measurements highly dynamic. Despite this variability, long-term observations reveal remarkable stability. Over the past four decades, the Florida Current’s overall transport has remained steady, emphasizing its essential role in global ocean circulation. Localized features such as mesoscale eddies also shape the Straits. A 2022 study documented a long-lasting cyclonic eddy that increased primary production and redistributed nutrient-rich waters, influencing both marine ecosystems and navigation.

== Crossing ==
The swim across the strait was performed by Australian Susie Maroney (with Shark cage diving) in 1997 and American Diana Nyad (without shark cage) in 2013. Nyad, who was 64 years old at the time of the attempt, took 52 hours and 54 minutes to cover the 106 miles (171 km) between Havana and Key West .

== Wildlife ==
The Florida Straits are home to many animals and plants; some are harvested for food and others help support the ecosystem. One example is the Caribbean Spiny Lobster or Panulirus argus. These lobsters are collected by fishers and are sold making millions of dollars and supporting the economy of the straits. another interesting animal that lives in the Straits is the lettuce sea slug or Elysia crispata these slugs have ruffled bodies to hide; the slug is able use photosynthesis by uses the chloroplasts from the algae it eats. there are also some corals that helps other animals and plants one is the boulder brain coral or colpophyllia natans. This coral is made up of groups of polyps these polyps are all identical. the coral is very strong which makes it good for other corals as a foundation.

== See also ==
- Florida Straits, an action-adventure film starring Fred Ward.
- Cay Sal Bank
