= Barbados–France Maritime Delimitation Agreement =

Agreement between the Government of the French Republic and the Government of Barbados on the delimitation of maritime areas between France and Barbados
- Type: Boundary delimitation
- Signed: 15 October 2009
- Location: Bridgetown, Barbados
- Effective: 15 January 2010
- Parties: Barbados; France
- Depositary: United Nations Secretariat
- Language: English; French

The Barbados–France Maritime Delimitation Agreement is a 2009 treaty between Barbados and France which delimits the maritime boundary between Barbados and the French Overseas departments of Guadeloupe and Martinique. The far western point under this agreement consists of the border at a tripoint with Saint Lucia as under the France–Saint Lucia Delimitation Agreement and proceeds in a northeast direction.

== See also ==
- Martinique Passage
- Dominica–France Maritime Delimitation Agreement
- Saint Lucia Channel

== Notes ==
- Notice of preliminary discussions
- Signature Of The Barbados/France Maritime Boundary Delimitation Treaty
- Statement by Senator the Hon. Maxine McClean, Minister of Foreign Affairs and Foreign Trade, on the Occasion of the Signature of the Barbados/France Maritime Boundary Delimitation Treaty Bridgetown - October 15, 2009
- Treaty details in English
- Treaty details in French
- DELIMITATION OF MARITIME BOUNDARIES WITHIN CARICOM
