= Shrine of St. Anthony =

Shrine of St. Anthony may refer to:

- Shrine of St. Anthony (Boston)
- Shrine of St. Anthony (Maryland)
- Saint Anthony's Chapel (Pittsburgh)
- St. Antony's Shrine, Kachchatheevu
- St. Anthony's Shrine, Kochchikade
- St. Anthony's Church, Wahakotte
