= India–Sri Lanka maritime boundary agreements =

Limit between 2 South Asian countries

- India-Sri Lanka maritime boundaries Bay of Bengal Boundary Palk Bay Boundary Gulf of Mannar Boundary
- Type: Boundary delimitation
- Signed: 1974, 1976
- Signatories: Foreign Secretary of India Kewal Singh Choudhary; Foreign Secretary of Sri Lanka W. T. Jayasinghe
- Parties: India; Sri Lanka; Maldives
- Language: English

India–Sri Lanka maritime boundary agreements were signed in 1974 and 1976 between India and Sri Lanka to define the international maritime boundary between the two countries. Treaties on maritime boundary were necessary to facilitate law enforcement and resource management, and to avoid conflict, in the waters since both countries located closely in the Indian Ocean, particularly in Palk Strait.

The first agreement was regarding the maritime boundary in waters between Ram Setu and the Palk Strait, and came into force on July 8, 1974. The second agreement, which was signed on March 23 and entered into force on May 10, 1976, defined the maritime boundaries in the Gulf of Mannar and the Bay of Bengal.

India, Sri Lanka and Maldives signed another agreement for determination of the tri-junction point in the Gulf of Mannar in July 1976. Later in November, India and Sri Lanka signed another agreement to extend the maritime boundary in the Gulf of Mannar. As part of the agreement, Sri Lanka received the full control of Katchatheevu island, which was earlier visited by both Indian and Sri Lankan fishermen.

== Agreements ==
The summarised agreements are:

Type of agreement	Signature date	Effective date
Boundary in historic waters of Palk Strait between the two countries and related matters	June 26/28, 1974	July 8, 1974
Maritime boundary in the Gulf of Mannar and Bay of Bengal and related matters	March 22, 1976	May 10, 1976
Determination of the tri-junction point between India, Sri Lanka and Maldives in the Gulf of Mannar	July 23/24/31, 1976	July 31, 1976
Extension of maritime boundary in the Gulf of Mannar	November 22, 1976	February 5, 1977

== See also ==
- India–Sri Lanka relations
- List of maritime boundary treaties
