= Oman–Pakistan maritime boundary =

Muscat Agreement on the Delimitation of the Maritime Boundary between the Sultanate of Oman and the Islamic Republic of Pakistan
- Location of the Gulf of Oman, separating Pakistan in the northeast from Oman in the south
- Type: Boundary delimitation
- Signed: 12 June 2000
- Location: Muscat, Muscat Governorate, Oman
- Effective: 21 November 2000
- Parties: Pakistan; Oman
- Depositary: United Nations Secretariat
- Languages: English; Arabic

The Oman–Pakistan maritime boundary refers to the international maritime border between Pakistan and Oman. It was formally established as a result of the Muscat Agreement on the Delimitation of the Maritime Boundary between the Sultanate of Oman and the Islamic Republic of Pakistan, which sought to delimit the exclusive economic zones (EEZ) of both countries in the Arabian Sea. The bilateral treaty was ratified on 12 June 2000 and came into effect on 21 November 2000.

== Maritime boundary agreement ==
The text of the maritime boundary treaty is available in both English and Arabic, and was ratified by the two governments in Muscat, Oman, in 2000. It consists of nine articles, setting out the terms of the delimitation line in accordance with the United Nations Convention on the Law of the Sea.

The Government and people of the Sultanate of Oman and the Government and people of the Islamic Republic of Pakistan,

Recalling the bonds of friendship and good-neighbourly relations existing between them,
Expressing their wish to delimit the maritime boundary between the two countries permanently, equitably and definitively in conformity with international law and relevant international conventions,

Have agreed as follows...

— Preamble of the Muscat Agreement

According to the treaty, the governments of Pakistan and Oman mutually recognise each other's sovereignty over the seabed, including the subsoil and superjacent waters, as defined by international law and the limits set forth in the Muscat Agreement. The treaty outlines necessary provisions for the discovery, exploitation and division of natural resources in the event of undersea directional drilling by either party that crosses the delimitation line, and mandates a 125-metre-wide zone on either side of the boundary wherein any activity shall be undertaken with mutual consent. The treaty also states that in the event of a maritime dispute, both sides shall "do their utmost to reach agreement regarding the best ways of coordinating and unifying their operations on both sides of the delimitation line." A copy of the agreement is deposited with the United Nations Secretariat.

=== Boundary delimitation ===
Article 3 of the Muscat Agreement assigns the following coordinate points as constituting the delimitation line between the exclusive economic zones of Pakistan and Oman, in conformance with WGS 1984. The line extends for 260 nautical miles.

Point No.	Latitude (N)	Longitude (E)
1	23 20' 48"	61 25' 00"
2	23 15' 22"	61 32' 48"
3	23 11' 40"	61 38' 11"
4	22 56' 35"	62 00' 51"
5	22 54' 37"	62 03' 50"
6	22 40' 37"	62 25' 17"
7	22 05' 01"	63 08' 23"
8	21 57' 13"	63 14' 21"
9	21 47' 24"	63 22' 13"

== Geography and history ==
Oman is geographically the nearest Persian Gulf nation to Pakistan, and shares extensive historical, cultural and maritime ties with the latter's Balochistan province. At their most proximate point, Pakistan's port city of Gwadar and Oman's Ras al Hadd are separated by a distance of only 320 km via sea. Both countries possess a coastline along the Gulf of Oman in the Arabian Sea, which itself forms the northern region of the Indian Ocean. Prior to its acquisition by Pakistan in 1958, Gwadar had formerly been an exclave of Oman since 1784. Many of the territory's older residents, who had been former Omani subjects, went on to possess dual Pakistani and Omani citizenship after the transfer was completed.

On 19 March 2015, Pakistan expanded its seabed territory by 50,000 square kilometres, following an application filed with the UN Commission on the Limits of the Continental Shelf (UNCLCS) in April 2009. Some of the claimed territory was noted to overlap with Oman's claims, an outcome that was settled following successful negotiations between the two governments.

== See also ==
- List of maritime boundary treaties
