= Daniel Dzurek =

American geographer

Academic work
- Discipline: Geography

Daniel J. Dzurek is an American academic geographer, author and government official. He was formerly the Chief of the Spatial, Environmental and Boundary Analysis Division of the United States Department of State.

== Selected works ==
Dzurek's published writings encompass 12 works in 15 publications in 1 language and 69 library holdings.

- Continental Shelf Boundary: Greece-Italy; June 6, 1982 (1982)
- Straight baselines: Vietnam; December 12, 1983 (1983)
- Maritime Boundary: Burma-Thailand; January 30, 1985 (1985)
- Continental Shelf Boundary: Turkey-U.S.S.R. and Straight Baselines (1988)
- Boundary Disputes and Resource Management in the South China Sea (1990)
- Deciphering the North Korean-Soviet (Russian) Maritime Boundary Agreements (1992)
- An Analytical Model for Managing the Sea of Japan (1992)
- The Spratly Islands Dispute: Who's on First (1996)
- Parting the Red Sea: Boundaries, Offshore Resources and Transit (2001)
- Ján Dzurek (1864-1917) and Terézia Kafská (1859-1919 : They Came to America Because of a Horse? (2007)

== See also ==
- Maritime boundary
