= Mainland =

Continental part of any polity or the main island within an island nation

Mainland is defined as "relating to or forming the main part of a country or continent, not including the islands around it [regardless of status under territorial jurisdiction by an entity]." The term is often politically, economically and/or demographically more significant than politically associated remote territories, such as exclaves or oceanic islands situated outside the continental shelf.

In geography, "mainland" can denote the continental part of any polity or the main island within an island nation. In geopolitics, "mainland" is sometimes used interchangeably with terms like metropole as an antonym to overseas territories. In the sense of "heartland", mainland is the opposite of periphery. In some language a separate concept of "mainland" is missing and is replaced with a "continental portion".

The term is relative: in Tasmania, continental Australia is the mainland, while to residents of Flinders Island, the main island of Tasmania is also "the mainland", though the geological Australian continent includes all the former plus the island of New Guinea and all the smaller islands (e.g. the Torres Strait Islands) in between.

== Prominent usages of the term mainland ==
=== Continental ===
This list denotes prominent usages of the term "mainland" to distinguish the islands of a continent from the mainland of a continent through a geopolitical lens.

- Mainland Africa, from the perspectives of Cape Verde, Comoros, Madagascar, Mauritius, São Tomé and Príncipe and Seychelles, as well as Mayotte (France) and Réunion (France)
- Mainland Asia, from the perspectives of Bahrain, Brunei, Cyprus (inc. Akrotiri and Dhekelia and Northern Cyprus), East Timor, Indonesia, Japan (inc. Okinawa Prefecture), the Maldives, the Philippines, Singapore, Sri Lanka, and Taiwan (inc. Kinmen, the Matsu Islands, and Penghu), as well as the Andaman and Nicobar Islands (India), Christmas Island (Australia), the Cocos (Keeling) Islands (Australia), Coloane and Taipa (Macau), East Malaysia (Malaysia), Hainan (China), Hong Kong Island (Hong Kong), Islands District (Hong Kong), Jeju Island (South Korea), Lakshadweep (India) and Sakhalin Oblast (Russia)
  - In the future, if the Salwa Canal is built, also from the perspective of Qatar
- Mainland Europe, from the perspectives of Cyprus, Iceland, Ireland, Malta, the United Kingdom (inc. Guernsey, the Isle of Man, and Jersey), as well as Åland (Finland), the Faroe Islands (Denmark), Jan Mayen (Norway), Svalbard (Norway), Corsica (France), Sardinia (Italy), Sicily (Italy), Danish islands (Denmark), Azores (Portugal), Madeira (Portugal), Canary Islands (Spain), Balearic Islands (Spain), Gotland (Sweden), Estonian islands (Estonia), Greek islands (Greece) and Russian islands (Russia)
  - Also note that several European countries possess colonies or outposts all around the world (often small islands) in all other continental regions including North America, South America, Africa, Oceania, Asia and Antarctica
- Mainland Europe, from the perspective of Scandinavia, a peninsula
- Mainland Southeast Asia, from the perspective of Maritime Southeast Asia
- Mainland North America, from the perspectives of Cuba, Greenland, Vancouver Island, Haida Gwaii, Newfoundland, Prince Edward Island and Jamaica
- Mainland South America, from the perspectives of the Falkland Islands

=== Internal ===
This list denotes prominent usages of the term "mainland" to distinguish between distinct regions within a single country based on an "islands-to-mainland" relationship. Note that the "mainland" can sometimes consist of a large island rather than a continental landmass.

- Mainland Argentina, as opposed to Tierra del Fuego Province (including Argentinian Antarctic claims), as well as other islands of Argentina
- Mainland Australia, as opposed to the island of Tasmania and other Australian islands, especially those not part of Australia proper.
- Mainland Brazil, as opposed to Abrolhos, Fernando de Noronha, Ilhabela, Saint Peter and Saint Paul and Trindade and Martim Vaz.
- Mainland Britain, as opposed to the many smaller islands of the United Kingdom. The largest islands within the Northern Isles are called Orkney Mainland and Shetland Mainland, respectively.
- Mainland Canada, as opposed to Canadian Islands, particularly those in the Maritimes or in the Arctic
  - the Mainland Colony was the mainland part of British Columbia, prior to its merger with Vancouver Island; today, the term "Lower Mainland" refers the southernmost part of the coast of British Columbia
  - the continental part of Nova Scotia, as opposed to Cape Breton Island and other Nova Scotian islands
- Mainland Chile, as opposed to remote islands of the Chilean Sea, Tierra del Fuego Province and Chilean Antarctic claims, as well as offshore islands of Chile such as the Chiloé Archipelago and Easter Island
- Mainland China, a term that usually refers to all territories, irrespective of geography, that are administered by the People's Republic of China (PRC), aside from Hong Kong and Macau, which are both administered by the PRC as semi-independent special administrative regions
- Mainland Colombia, as opposed to the overseas archipelago of San Andrés, Providencia, and Santa Catalina.
- the Cuban Mainland, as opposed to the Canarreos Archipelago and other islands of Cuba
- Mainland Denmark, as opposed to overseas parts of the Danish Realm; geographically, Denmark proper consists of a continental portion called Jutland and nearby Danish Isles
  - the main island is Greenland, excluding Disko Island and other islands of Greenland
- Mainland Ecuador, as opposed to the Galápagos Islands and other islands of Ecuador
- Mainland Equatorial Guinea, as opposed to the non-continental islands of Equatorial Guinea.
- Mainland Estonia, as opposed to the West Estonian archipelago with two of the fifteen counties and other islands of Estonia
- Mainland Finland, as opposed to Åland; historically, Finland Proper made up the southwestern portion of the mainland
- Mainland France, as opposed to Corsica and other islands within European France; also used loosely as an antonym of Overseas France, despite the fact that the term Metropolitan France is more apt
  - the main island of New Caledonia, as opposed to the Loyalty Islands and other islands of New Caledonia
- Mainland Greece (including the island of Euboea), as opposed to the Greek islands
- the main island of Iceland, as opposed to other islands of Iceland
- Mainland India, as opposed to its insular union territories or any other islands of India
- Mainland Italy, as opposed to its insular regions or any other islands of Italy
- Mainland Japan, as opposed to the other home islands, or to remote islands of Japan, such as the Nanpō Islands
- Mainland Korea as opposed to Jeju Island and other islands of North Korea or South Korea
- the main island of Madagascar, as opposed to other islands of Madagascar
- Mainland Malaysia as opposed to East Malaysia or to any islands of Malaysia
- Mainland Malta, as opposed to Gozo and other islands of Malta
- Mainland Netherlands as opposed to the Dutch Caribbean; the Netherlands proper contains numerous offshore islands
- Mainland New Zealand, is the two islands, the north and south islands. The South Island of New Zealand is sometimes jokingly called the Mainland or the main island, especially by South Islanders themselves. Though it has a far smaller population, it is larger than the North Island. "Mainland New Zealand" more commonly refers to the archipelago made up of the North and South Island and smaller nearby islands, often excluding more outlying islands such as the Chatham Islands, and always excluding remote insular parts of the Realm of New Zealand.
- Mainland Norway, as opposed to Svalbard and other islands of Norway, including its overseas dependencies
  - the main island of Svalbard, as opposed to Nordaustlandet and other Islands of Svalbard
- the mainland part of Papua New Guinea, as opposed to the Islands Region or to any other islands of Papua New Guinea
- Mainland Portugal, as opposed to its insular regions, or more broadly to any islands of Portugal; until 1975, the term "mainland" was used loosely as an antonym of overseas Portugal
- Mainland Spain as opposed to the Balearic and Canary Islands and other lands under Spanish sovereignty; cf. the colonial-era term peninsulares
- the main island of Sri Lanka, as opposed to other islands of Sri Lanka
- Mainland United States, as opposed to nearby islands belonging to a certain U.S. state, the Hawaiian Islands, and to U.S. island territories in the Pacific or Caribbean. The terms "contiguous United States" (48 adjoining states in the continent of North America which does not include Alaska) or "continental United States" (any U.S. state that is part of the North American continent which includes Alaska) are widely used instead, despite including adjacent islands on the continental shelf in both definitions.
  - Mainland Alaska (which is a part on the North American continent and a component of the U.S. mainland), as opposed to the approximately 2,670 named offshore islands (many of which are part of the Alexander Archipelago or Aleutian Islands chain).
  - Point Roberts (a pene-exclave of Washington state) views Bellingham as "the mainland". The closure of international borders due to the COVID-19 pandemic rendered it (de facto) an island in all but name.
- Main or Big Land—in Russia—as opposed to Minor Land, islands, or other isolated territories that are connected by water or air travel but not by paved road.
- Mainland Tanzania Tanzania-as opposed to Zanzibar the semi autonomous islands off the coast of Tanzania when the two countries merged in 1964 between Tanganyika(Now known as Tanzanian Mainland) and Zanzibar.

=== Internal (disputed) ===
This list denotes prominent internal usages of the term "mainland" that are disputed.

- Mainland Taiwan, as opposed to Kinmen, Matsu, Penghu and other islands of Taiwan
  - The cause of the dispute is Taiwan's uncertain sovereignty. Nevertheless, if the Republic of China on Taiwan is regarded as an independent country, it is geographically one large island surrounded by several smaller islands. Politically, Kinmen, Matsu and Penghu are de facto top-level subdivisions within Taiwan, classified as counties.
- Mainland Ukraine, as opposed to Crimea, which is nonetheless geographically part of the European mainland.
  - The cause of this dispute is the annexation of Crimea by the Russian Federation. From a Russian perspective, Russia is the mainland to Crimea.
- Mainland Britain, as opposed to Northern Ireland
  - This is politically charged term in Ireland, mainly used by pro-UK unionists and generally avoided by Irish nationalists.

=== Irredentist ===
This list denotes prominent usages of the term "mainland" to distinguish between distinct regions within an irredentist region

- The relationship between the de facto independent state of Republic of China (ROC; commonly called Taiwan) and the PRC as that of an island to its mainland. This is done in order to tacitly support the PRC's territorial claim to Taiwan. This is highly controversial among supporters of Taiwanese independence. Within Taiwan, Pan-Blue politicians who support the ROC's constitutional territorial claim to mainland China have popularised this phrase as well.
- Mainland Greece as opposed to the Greek part of Cyprus

== See also ==
- "Mainland Province", the southern portion of the Spanish Main
- Etymology of the toponym "Maine"
- Cartographic generalization
- Omission of Tasmania from maps of Australia
- Mainlander (disambiguation)
