= Outlying territory =

Type of territory

An outlying territory or separate area is a state territory geographically separated from its parent territory and lies beyond Exclusive Economic Zone of its parent territory.

The tables below are lists of outlying territories which are marked by distinct, non-contiguous maritime boundaries or land boundaries:

== Outlying geographical regions ==
Outlying Territory	Parent Territory- State/Dependency	Outlying Territory Note
Alaska	United States	exclave
(French Southern and Antarctic Lands) Amsterdam and St.Paul Islands	French Southern and Antarctic Lands	
(India) Andaman and Nicobar Islands	India	
Azores	Portugal	autonomous area
(Equatorial Guinea) Annobón	Equatorial Guinea	
(Saint Helena) Ascension Island	Saint Helena, Ascension and Tristan da Cunha	
(French Southern and Antarctic Lands) Europa and Juan de Nova Islands	French Southern and Antarctic Lands	including Bassas da India
Bornholm	Denmark	
(French Southern and Antarctic Lands) Crozet Islands	French Southern and Antarctic Lands	
(Chile) Desventuradas Islands	Chile	
Galápagos Islands	Ecuador	special regime
Gaza Strip	Palestine	
(French Southern and Antarctic Lands) Glorioso Islands	French Southern and Antarctic Lands	
Oecusse	East Timor	autonomous area
Kaliningrad Oblast	Russia	exclave
Line Islands (Eastern Kiribati)	Kiribati	
(Australia) Macquarie Island	Australia	
(Oman) Musandam	Oman	governorate, exclave
(Azerbaijan) Nakhchivan	Azerbaijan	
Phoenix Islands (Central Kiribati)	Kiribati	
(South Africa) Prince Edward Islands	South Africa	
Tristan da Cunha	Saint Helena, Ascension and Tristan da Cunha	
(Brazil) Trindade and Martim Vaz	Brazil	
(French Southern and Antarctic Lands) Tromelin Island	French Southern and Antarctic Lands	

== Outlying territories outside the continent ==
Outlying Territory	Parent Territory- State	Outlying Territory Note
Bonaire	Netherlands	special municipality of the Netherlands from October 10, 2010; island retains its status as overseas territory of the European Union during transitional period.
Canary Islands	Spain	Autonomous Community
Ceuta	Spain	Autonomous C
Easter Island (Rapa Nui)	Chile	new status from 6 June 2007
East Malaysia	Malaysia	
French Guiana	France	overseas region
Guadeloupe	France	overseas region
Hawaii	United States	
Madeira	Portugal	autonomous area
Martinique	France	overseas region
Mayotte	France	overseas region
Melilla	Spain	Autonomous City
(Japan) Minami Torishima	Japan	
(United States) Palmyra Atoll	United States	
Réunion	France	overseas region
Saba	Netherlands	special municipalities of the Netherlands from October 10, 2010; islands retain their status as overseas territories of the European Union during this transitional period.
Sint Eustatius	Netherlands	special municipalities of the Netherlands from October 10, 2010; islands retain their status as overseas territories of the European Union during this transitional period.

== Outlying uninhabited dependent territories ==
Outlying Territory	Parent Territory- State	Outlying Territory Note
(United States) Baker and Howland Islands	United States	dependent territories
(Norway) Bouvet Island	Norway	
British Indian Ocean Territory	United Kingdom	
Christmas Island	Australia	
Cocos (Keeling) Islands	Australia	
(France) Clipperton Island	France	
(Australia) Heard and McDonald Islands	Australia	
(Norway) Jan Mayen	Norway	
(United States) Jarvis Island	United States	
(United States) Johnston Atoll	United States	
(French Southern and Antarctic Lands) TAAF, Kerguelen Islands	France	
(United States) Navassa Island	United States	
(United States) Kingman Reef	United States	
South Georgia and the South Sandwich Islands	United Kingdom	
(United States) Wake Island	United States	

== Outlying dependent territories and areas of special sovereignty ==
Outlying Territory	Parent Territory- State	Outlying Territory Note
American Samoa	United States	
Anguilla	United Kingdom	
Aruba	Kingdom of the Netherlands	
Bermuda	United Kingdom	
British Virgin Islands	United Kingdom	
Cayman Islands	United Kingdom	
Cook Islands	New Zealand	
Curaçao	Kingdom of the Netherlands	
Falkland Islands	United Kingdom	
Faroe Islands	Denmark	
French Polynesia	France	
Greenland	Denmark	
Gibraltar	United Kingdom	
Guam	United States	
Montserrat	United Kingdom	
New Caledonia	France	
Niue	New Zealand	
Norfolk Island	Australia	
Northern Mariana Islands	United States	
Pitcairn Islands	United Kingdom	
Puerto Rico	United States	
Saint Barthélemy	France	
Saint Helena, Ascension and Tristan da Cunha, (Saint Helena)	United Kingdom	
Saint Martin	France	
Saint Pierre and Miquelon	France	
Sint Maarten	Kingdom of the Netherlands	
(Norway) Svalbard	Norway	Svalbard has not got EEZ, its sea waters under special regime by Svalbard treaty.
Tokelau	New Zealand	
Turks and Caicos Islands	United Kingdom	
Virgin Islands, U.S.	United States	
Wallis and Futuna	France	

== Notes ==
- 1. Enclaves are not included.
- 2. Disputed outlying territories in the Spratly Islands are not included.

== See also ==
- List of sovereign states
- List of dependent territories
