= Katchatheevu =

Island of Sri Lanka

Native name: கச்சத்தீவு කච්චතිවු දූපත
- Location within Sri Lanka

Geography
- Coordinates: 9°23′0″N 79°31′0″E
- Area: 285 acres (115 ha)
- Length: 1.6 km (0.99 mi)
- Width: 300 m (1000 ft)

Administration
- Sri Lanka
- Province: Northern
- District: Jaffna
- DS Division: Delft

Additional information
- Time zone: Sri Lanka Standard Time Zone (UTC+5:30)

Kachchatheevu location in Jaffna Peninsula, extreme bottom left or southwest of the map

Katchatheevu (Tamil: கச்சத்தீவு, Tamil pronunciation: [kəttʃət̪t̪iːʋʉ], Sinhala: කච්චතිවු දූපත, Sinhala pronunciation: [kaccativu dūpata]) is an uninhabited island in Sri Lanka. The island was governed by British Ceylon (now Sri Lanka) from 1921. Though the Indian government never controlled it, the island remained disputed between India and Sri Lanka until 1974 when India recognised Sri Lanka's sovereignty over the island.

The island is located between Neduntheevu, Sri Lanka and Rameswaram, India and has been traditionally used by both Sri Lankan Tamil and Indian Tamil fishermen. In 1974, then Prime Minister of India, Indira Gandhi accepted Katchatheevu as Sri Lankan territory under the Indo-Sri Lankan Maritime agreement aimed at resolving the maritime boundaries in the Palk Strait. Another agreement signed in 1976 restricted both the countries' fishermen from fishing in the other's exclusive economic zones. Earlier, it had been owned by the Ramnad Kingdom of Ramanathapuram Rameshwaram which later came under the Madras Presidency during British rule of the Indian subcontinent. By 1920, Ceylon had reinstated its claims to Katchatheevu and the island found itself within Ceylonese territory in 1921.

== History ==
The oldest known name of the island, Kacci (modern Kaccativu), is mentioned in the Rameswaram Inscription of King Nissanka Malla (1187–1196 CE), the king of Sri Lanka, along with other nearby islands including Puvagu (modern Pungudutivu), Mininak (Maninaga), and Kara (modern Karaitivu). The inscription states that Nissankamalla visited these islands during his expeditions within his realm. Historical evidence suggests that Kachchativu Island has been under the jurisdiction of Sri Lanka since the era of the Portuguese, Dutch, and British. The British occasionally used the island as a naval gunnery practice range from 1920 onwards. During the medieval period, this island along with Pamban Island was in the possession of the Jaffna kingdom. From the 17th century onwards, the island was part of the Ramnad Kingdom in Madura district (present-day Madurai district, India). Later, with British rule on the Indian subcontinent, the island became part of the Madras Presidency.

The dispute over the island between the Ceylonese and Indian colonial governments arose in 1920. While the Indian view was that the island was part of India because it belonged to a landlord of the Raja of Ramnad, B. Horsburgh opposed this view and cited evidence that Katchatheevu, along with St. Anthony's Church on the island, belonged to the Diocese of Jaffna. By 1921, both sides had agreed on a border that put the island within Ceylonese territory.

Ownership of the island was disputed between India and Sri Lanka up until 1974 as it had been during British rule. It was never demarcated by the Indian government. India recognized Sri Lanka's ownership of the island in 1974. The legality of the transfer was challenged in the Indian Supreme Court since the recognition had not been ratified by the Indian Parliament. This recognition of an island that is culturally important to fishermen of Tamil Nadu state in India has led to some agitations by Tamil Nadu politicians that India should claim sovereignty over it. The island is also important as fishing grounds used by fishermen from both countries. The Indo-Sri Lankan agreement allows Indian fishermen to fish around Katchatheevu and to dry their nets on the island. As part of the Sri Lankan Civil War, the arrangement led to many difficulties with the Sri Lankan Navy, which was deployed to prevent smuggling of weapons by the rebel group LTTE. The island has a Catholic shrine that attracts devotees from both countries.

The main problem continues to grow as more fishermen move into the Sri Lankan sea area for poaching. In 2010 the Sri Lankan government issued a notice to the Tamil Nadu government saying the Indian court cannot nullify the 1974 agreement.

In June 2011 the new Tamil Nadu government led by the chief minister of Tamil Nadu, J. Jayalalithaa, filed a petition in the Supreme Court that the declaration of the 1974 and 1976 agreements between India and Sri Lanka on ceding of Katchatheevu to Sri Lanka were unconstitutional. The court ruled in the Berubari case that the cession of Indian territory to another country had to be ratified by parliament through amendment of the Constitution.

The Indian government in February 2014 stated, "No territory belonging to India was ceded nor sovereignty relinquished since the area was in dispute and had never been demarcated." The government added that the agreements did not require a constitutional amendment because no territory was ceded.

A motion of the Katchatheevu dispute was reopened by the Bharatiya Janata Party (BJP) ahead of the general elections in India, which are set to start on April 19, 2024. The BJP brought this issue to the forefront as part of its election campaign, particularly targeting the discontent of Indian fishermen affected by the 1976 agreement that barred them from fishing in the waters around the island. Sri Lanka's Foreign Minister, Ali Sabry, has publicly dismissed the motion of reopening discussions about Katchatheevu, stating the issue was resolved 50 years ago. In March 2025, Tamil Nadu Assembly passed a resolution to reclaim Katchatheevu Island from Sri Lanka.

== St. Anthony's Shrine ==
St Antony's Shrine is the only structure on the island. It is a shrine-church named after Antony of Padua, considered a patron saint of seafarers by Christians. It was built by a prosperous Indian Catholic (Tamilian) fisherman Srinivasa Padaiyachi in the early 20th century. The annual church festival runs for three days. Christian priests from both India and Sri Lanka conduct the worship services (Mass) and procession. Pilgrims from India are ferried mostly from Rameswaram. According to the agreement between the Indian and Sri Lankan governments, the citizens of India are not required to possess an Indian passport or Sri Lankan visa to visit Kachchatheevu.

== See also ==
- Extreme points of Sri Lanka
- India–Sri Lanka maritime boundary agreements
- Palk Strait bridge
- India - Sri Lanka land border
