= Wahakotte =

Wahacotte வாஹாகோட்டை
- Village
- Location within Sri Lanka
- Coordinates: 7°43′10″N 80°34′58″E
- Country: Sri Lanka
- Province: Central Province
- Time zone: UTC+5:30 (Sri Lanka Standard Time)

Wahakotte or Wahacotte is a village in Sri Lanka. It is located within Matale District, Central Province.

St. Anthony's shrine at Wahakotte is one of the most sacred shrines for Catholics in Sri Lanka.

== See also ==
- List of towns in Central Province, Sri Lanka
