= France–Saint Lucia Delimitation Agreement =

1981 treaty between France and Saint Lucia

France – Saint Lucia Delimitation Agreement
Agreement on Delimitation between the Government of the French Republic and the Government of Saint Lucia
- Type: Boundary delimitation
- Signed: 4 March 1981
- Location: Paris, France
- Effective: 4 March 1981
- Parties: France; Saint Lucia
- Depositary: United Nations Secretariat
- Languages: English; French

The France – Saint Lucia Agreement on Delimitation is a 1981 treaty between France and Saint Lucia which delimits the maritime boundary between Saint Lucia and the French territory of Martinique.

The treaty was signed in Paris on 4 March 1981. The text of the treaty sets out a boundary that is an equidistant line between the two islands in the Saint Lucia Channel. The boundary is set out in an east–west direction and consists of 17 straight-line maritime segments defined by 18 individual coordinate points. The far western point of the boundary is the tripoint with Venezuela and the far eastern point is the tripoint with Barbados. Commentators have noted that it is curious that the treaty does not refer to the island of Martinique.

The treaty came into force upon signature. The full name of the treaty is Agreement on Delimitation between the Government of the French Republic and the Government of Saint Lucia.

== See also ==
- Barbados–France Maritime Delimitation Agreement
