= Dominica–France Maritime Delimitation Agreement =

Agreement on Maritime Delimitation between the Government of French Republic and the Government of Dominica
- Type: Boundary delimitation
- Signed: 7 September 1987
- Location: Paris, France
- Effective: 23 December 1988
- Parties: Dominica; France
- Depositary: United Nations Secretariat
- Language: English; French

The Dominica–France Maritime Delimitation Agreement is a 1987 treaty between Dominica and France which delimits the maritime boundary between Dominica and the French islands of Guadeloupe and Martinique. It was the first maritime boundary treaty in the Central America/Caribbean region to be based on the rules of the Convention on the Law of the Sea.

The treaty was signed in Paris on 7 September 1987. The text of the treaty sets out two boundaries. The first boundary separates Dominica from Guadeloupe to its north. The boundary is 298 nautical miles (552 km; 343 mi) long and is a simplified equidistant line that runs through the Dominica Passage in roughly an east–west direction. It consists of seven straight-line maritime segments defined by eight individual coordinate points.

The more southern boundary separates Dominica from Martinique to its south. The boundary is 294 nautical miles (544 km; 338 mi) long and is a simplified equidistant line that runs through the Martinique Passage in roughly an east–west direction and roughly parallel to the first boundary. It consists of five straight-line segments defined by six individual coordinate points.

The treaty came into force on 23 December 1988 after it had been ratified by both states. The full name of the treaty is Agreement on Maritime Delimitation between the Government of French Republic and the Government of Dominica. The treaty was signed by French prime minister Jacques Chirac and Dominica prime minister Eugenia Charles.

== See also ==
- Dominica Passage
- Martinique Passage
- Barbados–France Maritime Delimitation Agreement
