= Saint Lucia Channel =

Strait in the Caribbean

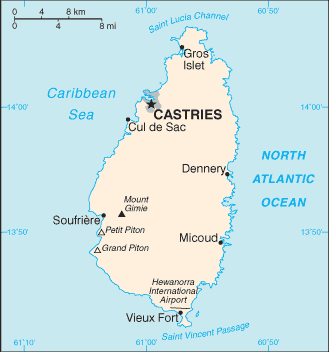
- Map of Saint Lucia with Saint Lucia Channel at the top

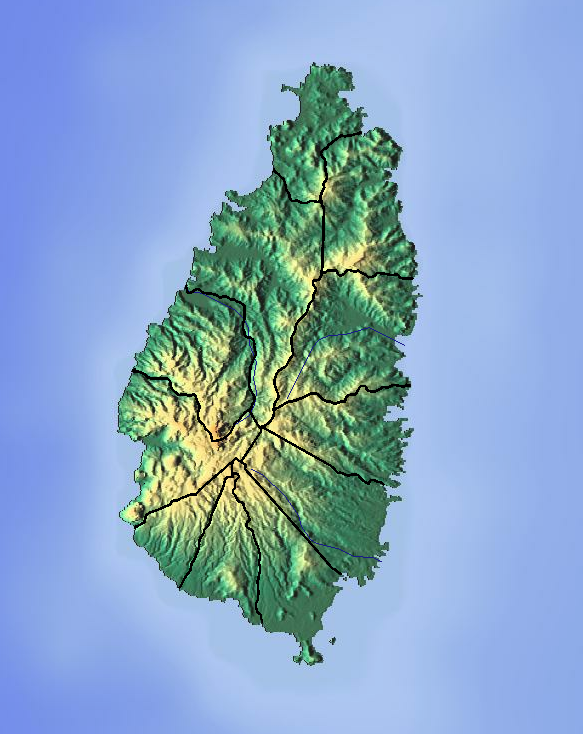
- Location within Saint Lucia Location within the Caribbean
- Location: Saint Lucia; Martinique
- Coordinates: 14°09′N 60°57′W
- Max. length: 8 miles (13 km) ~ 13 miles (21 km)
- Max. width: 17 miles (27 km)

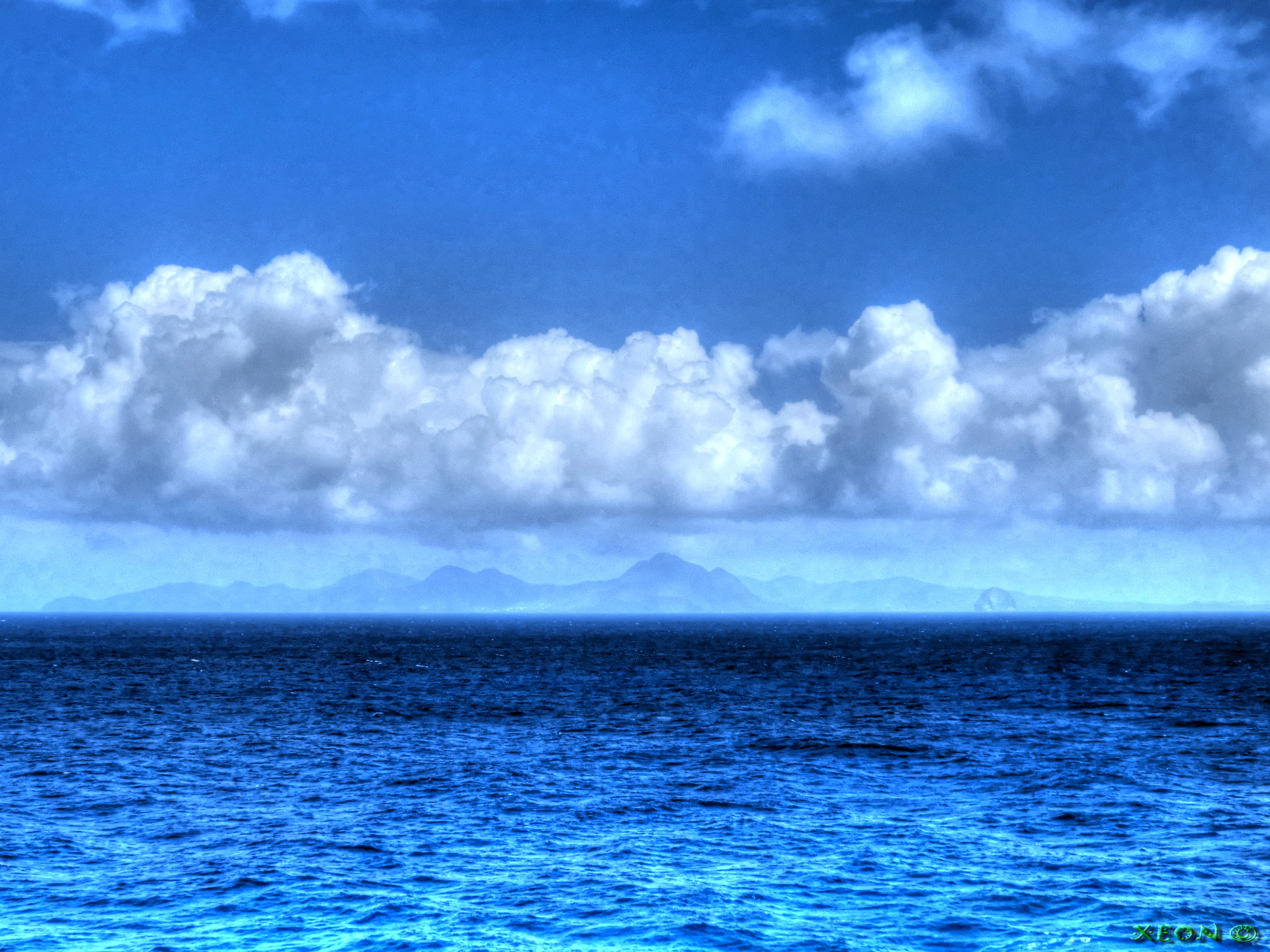
Saint Lucia Channel

Saint Lucia Channel is a strait in the Caribbean that separates French island Martinique, to the north, and Saint Lucia, in the south. It is a pathway between the Caribbean Sea and Atlantic Ocean.
The Diamond Rock is in the St. Lucia Canal.

== History ==
On August 17, 2007, Hurricane Dean crossed the channel as a Category 2 storm.

== See also ==
- Martinique Passage
- Barbados–France Maritime Delimitation Agreement
- France–Saint Lucia Delimitation Agreement
- Saint Vincent Passage
