= USSR–USA Maritime Boundary Agreement =

Agreement between the United States and the Soviet Union

Coordinates: 65°30′00″N 168°58′37″W

Russia–United States border
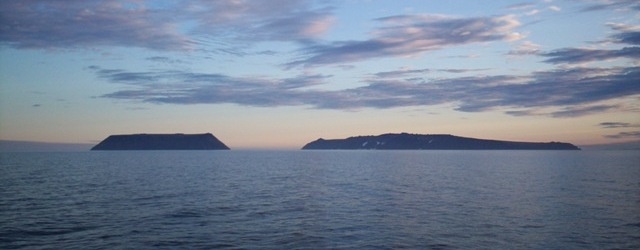
- Diomede Islands: Little Diomede (left, U.S.) and Big Diomede, (right, Russia) viewed from the north, looking south

Characteristics
- Entities: Russia United States
- Length: 49 km

History
- Established: 1867; Alaska Purchase by the United States from the Russian Empire
- Current shape: 1990; USA/USSR Maritime Boundary Agreement

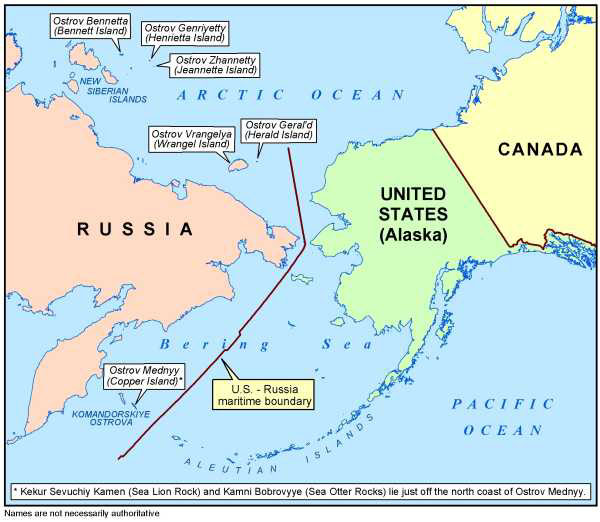
Maritime boundary sketch

The Russia–United States maritime boundary was established by the June 1, 1990 USA/USSR Maritime Boundary Agreement (Russian: Соглашение между СССР и США о линии разграничения морских пространств). The United States Senate gave its advice and consent to ratification as early as on September 16, 1991, but it has yet to be approved by the Russian State Duma. This delimitation line is also known as the Baker–Shevardnadze line agreement (Russian: Соглашении о Линии Шеварднадзе-Бейкера), after the officials who signed the deal, Minister of Foreign Affairs of the Soviet Union Eduard Shevardnadze and US secretary of state James Baker. The 1990 Agreement has been provisionally applied by the two countries since its date of signature. (The Russian Federation is the successor of the USSR with respect to the 1990 Agreement and the agreement to provisionally apply it.)

In general concept, the 1990 line is based on the 1867 United States – Russia Convention providing for the US purchase of Alaska. From the point, 65° 30' N, 168° 58' 37" W the maritime boundary extends north along the 168° 58' 37" W meridian through the Bering Strait and Chukchi Sea into the Arctic Ocean as far as permitted under international law. From the same point southwards, the boundary follows a line specified by maritime geographic positions given in the Agreement. The legality of the Shevardnadze-Baker agreement has been raised in Russia many times, pointing out that the initiators of the agreement did not hold preliminary discussions sufficient to consider this agreement from the point of view of the Government of Russia (USSR).

Nikolai Ivanovich Ryzhkov, who held the post of chairman of the Council of Ministers of the USSR at that time, claimed that neither the Politburo nor the Council of Ministers of the USSR considered him, and he, the head of government, never signed such documents. The staff of the Russian Foreign Ministry refers to the Resolution of the Council of Ministers of the USSR dated May 30, 1990 No. 532 "On the delimitation of maritime spaces with the United States", in which the draft Agreement was approved.

At the same time, there was no provision in the legislation of the USSR for the temporary entry into force of treaties on territorial division with other states. They are subject to mandatory ratification. Moreover, in accordance with the Constitution of the USSR (paragraph 3, Article 108), the definition of the state border of the USSR was the exclusive responsibility of the Congress of People's Deputies of the USSR.

The United States ratified the Agreement on September 16, 1991. The issue of ratification of the Agreement by Russia was not raised, primarily due to ambiguous assessments of its economic consequences for fishing in the Bering Sea.

Russian government agencies have repeatedly conducted an examination of this Agreement for its compliance with the norms of international maritime law, the interests of Russia and an assessment of possible consequences in the event of non-ratification. The agreement does not contradict the interests of Russia, except for the loss of the right to conduct marine fishing in the area in the middle part of the Bering Sea. The Russian side has been negotiating with the United States in order to conclude a comprehensive agreement on fishing in the northern part of the Bering Sea, which would compensate Russian fishermen for losses from fishing in areas ceded to the United States.

In 1999, the state of Alaska intervened in the dispute. In its resolution HJR-27, the state legislature questioned the legality of the borders between the United States and Russia, since on June 1, 1990, US Secretary of State James Baker signed the agreement "On Maritime Borders" without the participation of representatives of Alaska in negotiations and without the consent of the state to the terms of the agreement.

== Dispute ==
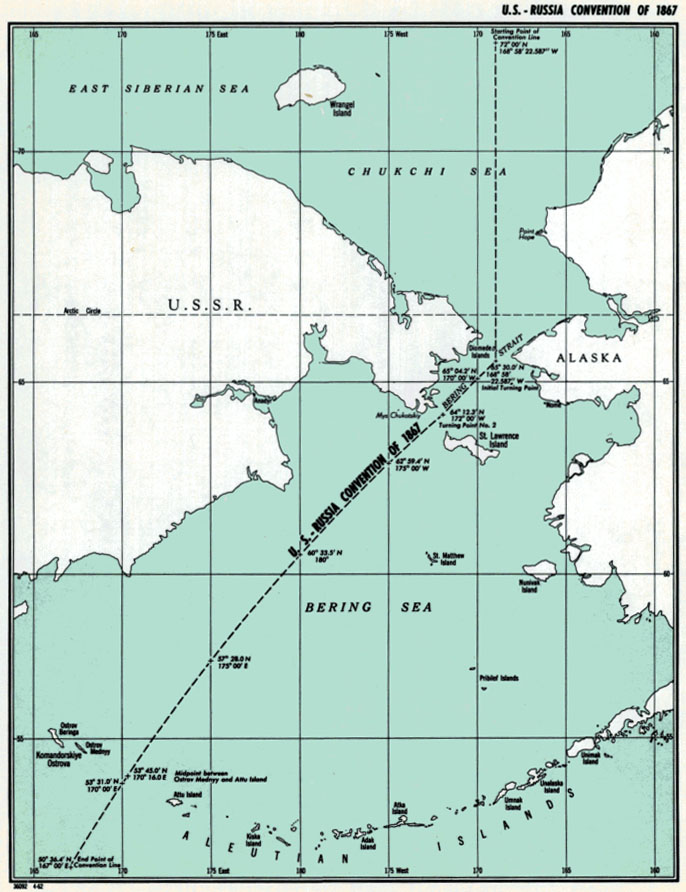
Map of the Agreement line

The need for the maritime boundary arose with the introduction of the 200-mile limit by the United States and the Soviet Union. The United States proposed using the 1867 Alaska line because it understood that to be the likely Soviet position. The 1990 delimitation was complicated since neither side could produce the maps used during the original Alaska purchase negotiations. Furthermore, the two sides agreed that the boundary was intended to be a straight line on a map, but they did not agree which map projection was used: Mercator or conformal. This resulted in about 15,000 square nautical miles (51,000 km^{2}) of disputed area. The 1990 line split the difference between the two lines and introduced several "special areas", which were beyond the 200-mile zone, but in which the sides ceded their rights to the opponent.

Many in Russia have criticized Mikhail Gorbachev and Edvard Shevardnadze for rushing the deal, ceding Russian fishing rights and other maritime benefits, but Foreign Minister Sergey Lavrov defended the agreement in 2024 as being in the interest of all parties.
