= 1993 United Kingdom–United States Maritime Boundary Treaties =

British-American agreement on Caribbean territorial extents

- Type: Boundary delimitation
- Signed: 5 November 1993
- Location: London, United Kingdom
- Effective: 1 June 1995
- Parties: United Kingdom; United States
- Depositary: United Nations Secretariat
- Language: English

The 1993 United Kingdom–United States Maritime Boundary Treaties are two treaties between the United Kingdom and the United States which established a maritime boundary between British territories and American territories in the Caribbean Sea.

Both treaties were signed in London on 5 November 1993. The first treaty delimits the boundary between the British territory of Anguilla and the United States Virgin Islands. The boundary is a simplified equidistant line that consists of a single maritime straight-line segment 1.34 nautical miles (2.48 km; 1.54 mi) long. It is defined by a straight line connecting two individual coordinate points. The full name of the treaty is Treaty between the Government of the United Kingdom of Great Britain and Northern Ireland and the Government of the United States of America on the Delimitation in the Caribbean of a Maritime Boundary between the US Virgin Islands and Anguilla.

The second treaty delimits the boundary between the British Virgin Islands and the United States Virgin Islands and Puerto Rico. The boundary is a simplified equidistant line that runs in a south–south-east direction until it terminates at the tripoint of Anguilla. It is far longer and more complicated than the Anguilla–U.S. Virgin Islands boundary: it is about 200 nautical miles (370 km; 230 mi) long and consists of 49 straight-line segments defined by 50 individual coordinate points. The full name of the treaty is Agreement between the Government of the United Kingdom of Great Britain and Northern Ireland and the Government of the United States of America on the Delimitation in the Caribbean of a Maritime Boundary between Puerto Rico/US Virgin Islands and the British Virgin Islands.

The two treaties entered into force on 1 June 1995 after they had been ratified by both states.
