= Martinique Passage =

Strait in the Caribbean

- Dominica Channel
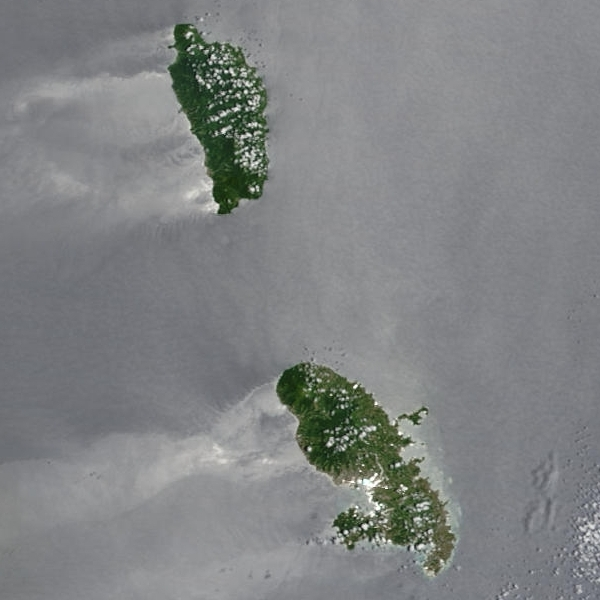
- Martinique Passage, shown between the two islands (Dominica up; Martinique down)

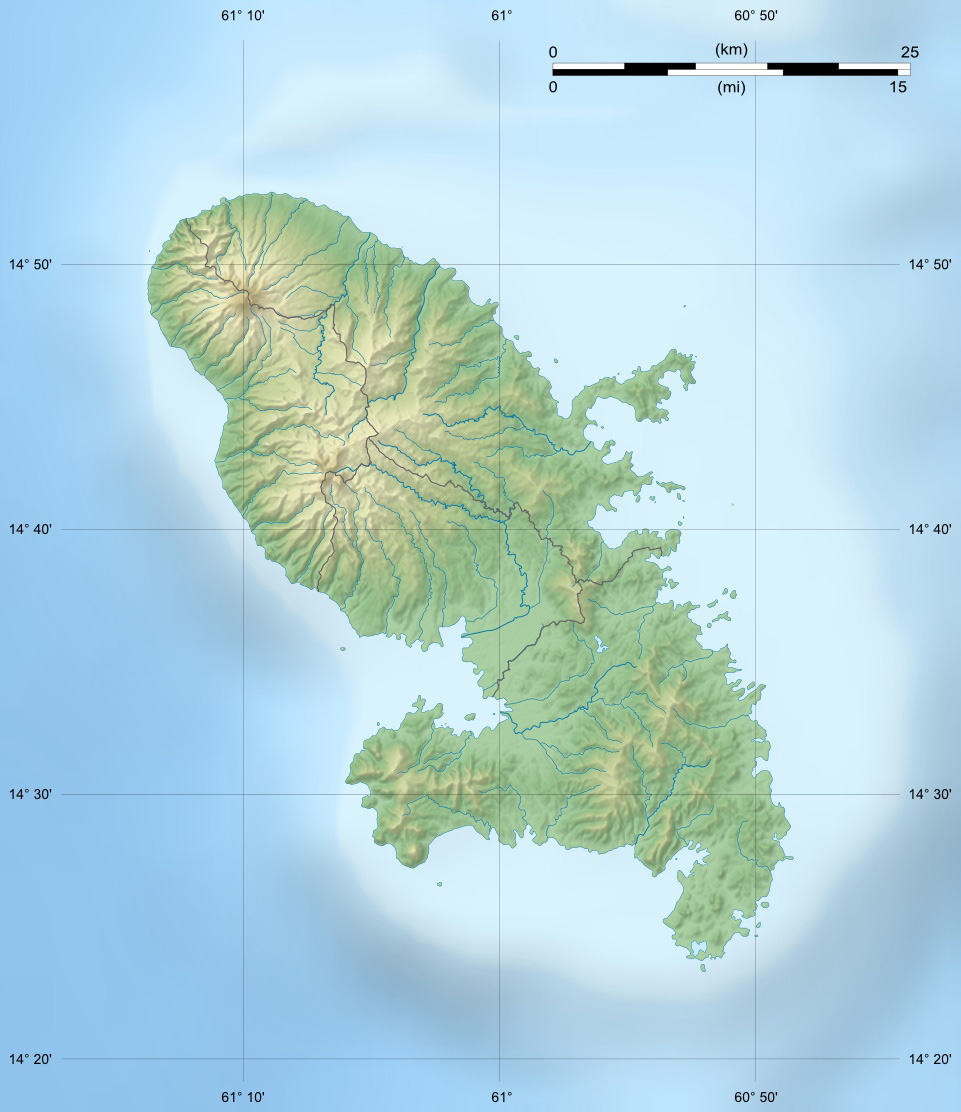
- Location within Martinique Location within Lesser Antilles Location within the Caribbean
- Location: Dominica; Martinique
- Coordinates: 15°00′00″N 61°15′00″W
- Max. width: 35 kilometres (22 mi)
- Average depth: 1,400 metres (4,600 ft)

Martinique Passage (also called Dominica Channel) is a strait in the Caribbean that separates Dominica and Martinique.

== See also ==
- Dominica–France Maritime Delimitation Agreement
- Saint Lucia Channel
