= St. Anthony's Shrine, Wahakotte =

Roman Catholic cathedral in Wahakotte, Sri Lanka

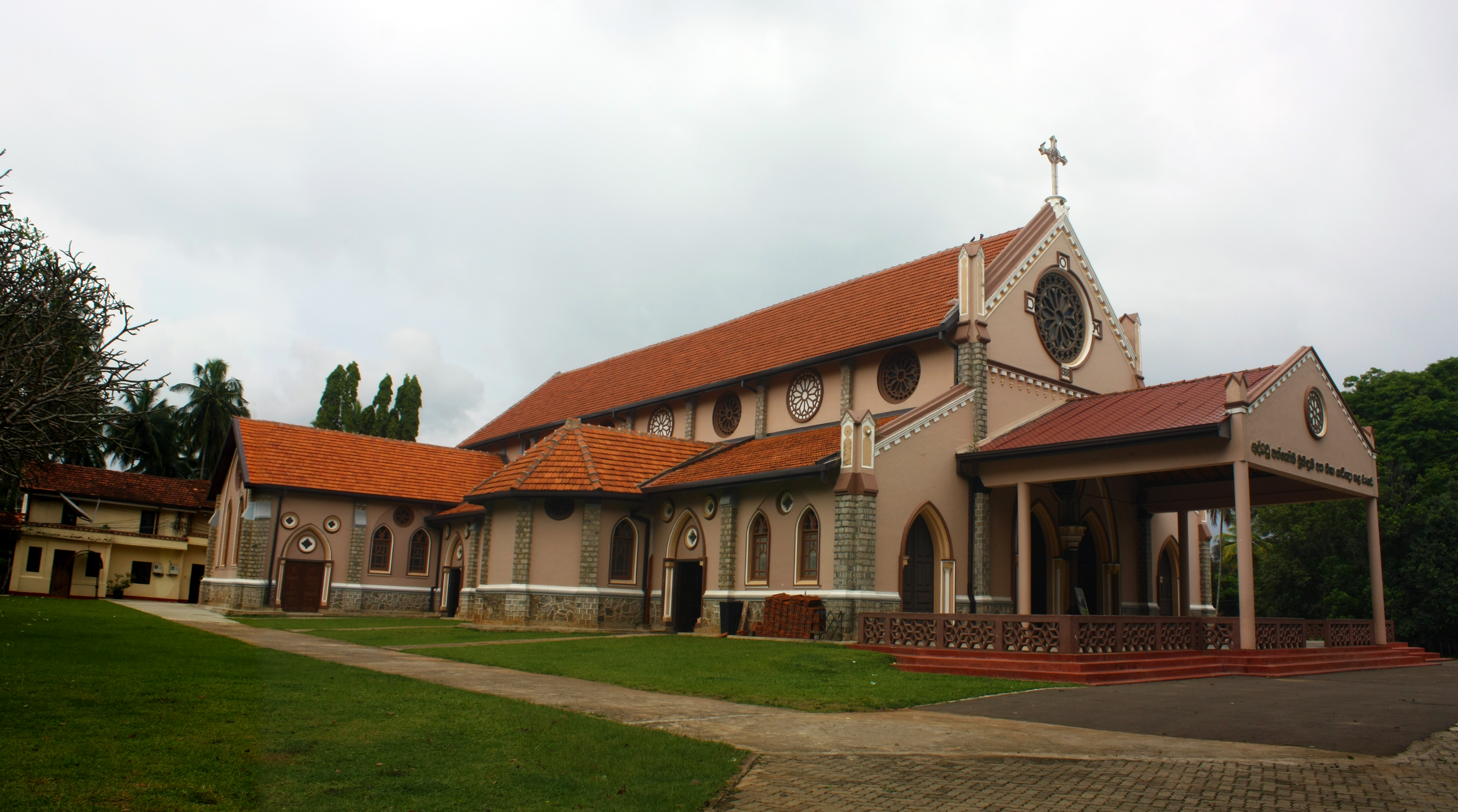

Religion
- Affiliation: Catholic Church
- Status: Active

Location
- Location: Wahacotte, Matale, Sri Lanka
- Interactive map of St. Anthony's Shrine, Wahakotte
- Coordinates: 7°43′19.8″N 80°35′03.6″E

Architecture
- Type: Cathedral
- Style: Baroque Revival
- Direction of façade: Southwest

The St. Anthony's Shrine, Wahakotte is the cathedral church of the Diocese of Kandy in Wahacotte. The church is located in Wahacotte, in the north of Matale District, about 32 km (20 mi) from Matale and is dedicated to Saint Anthony.

The church is one of the most sacred pilgrim places for Catholics in Sri Lanka and a national shrine. The Benedictine mission is attached to the church.
