= Australia–France Marine Delimitation Agreement =

1982 treaty between Australia and France

Agreement on Marine Delimitation between the Government of Australia and the Government of the French Republic
- Type: Boundary delimitation
- Signed: 4 January 1982
- Location: Melbourne, Victoria, Australia
- Effective: 10 January 1983
- Parties: Australia; France
- Languages: English; French

The Australia–France Marine Delimitation Agreement is a 1982 treaty between Australia and France which establishes ocean borders between Australian territories and French territories.

The treaty was signed in Melbourne on 4 January 1982. The treaty sets out two separate maritime boundaries. The first is the boundary between Australia and New Caledonia in the Coral Sea (including the boundary between Australia's Norfolk Island and New Caledonia). It consists of 21 straight-line segments defined by 22 individual coordinate points forming a modified equidistant line between the two territories. For purposes of drawing the treaty's equidistant lines, it was assumed that France has sovereignty over Matthew and Hunter Islands, a territory that is also claimed by Vanuatu. The northernmost point in the boundary is a tripoint with the Solomon Islands. The boundary runs in a roughly north–south direction and then turns and runs west–east until it almost reaches the 170th meridian east.

The second boundary established by the treaty is that between Heard and McDonald Islands (Australia) and Kerguelen Island (France) in the southern Indian Ocean. This boundary is also roughly equidistant and consists of seven straight-line segments defined by eight individual coordinate points.

The treaty came into force on 10 January 1983 after it was ratified by both states. The full name of the treaty is Agreement on Marine Delimitation between the Government of Australia and the Government of the French Republic.
