= Mainlander =

Mainlander may refer to:

== People group/demonym ==
- Mainland Chinese
- Waishengren, a term used in Taiwan to refer to mainland Chinese who moved to Taiwan after 1945 and their descendants
- People from Greater Vancouver, used by residents of British Columbia.
- Australians who live on mainland Australia, used by residents of Tasmania.
- Malaysians who live on Peninsular Malaysia, used by residents of Sabah, Sarawak, as well as islands such as Langkawi and Penang Island.
- Mainland New Zealand people
- People from contiguous United States and Alaska, used by Hawaiians, Puerto Ricans, or residents of overseas U.S. territories
- Canadians who are not from Newfoundland or Vancouver Island, used by residents of those islands
- People from Continental Europe, used by the British
- People from the mainland part of metropolitan France when referred to by Corsicans or people of Overseas France, in French as les continentaux

== Person ==
- Philipp Mainländer
