= St. Antony's Shrine, Kachchatheevu =

Roman Catholic church in Katchatheevu, Sri Lanka

St. Anthony's Shrine

Religion
- Affiliation: Roman Catholic
- Diocese: Jaffna
- Ecclesiastical or organisational status: Functioning

Location
- Location: Kachchatheevu, Sri Lanka
- Interactive map of St. Anthony's Shrine
- Coordinates: 9°23′0″N 79°31′0″E

Architecture
- Completed: ?

St. Anthony's Shrine is a unique place of worship as it shares the maritime borders of two countries, India and Sri Lanka, and is a declared holy place by Sri Lanka. This island is also spelled as Kachchatheevu or Katchatheevu.

== History ==
St. Anthony's Catholic Shrine was dedicated in 1905, called in Tamil as Anthoniyar Koil (புனித அந்தோனியார் கோயில்), has traditions that are over 100 years old, and was built by an Indian Catholic Seenikuppan Padayatchi, Ramnad Catholic diocese, on this uninhabited island. This church is dedicated to Anthony of Padua, the patron saint of fishermen. No one was required to possess an Indian passport or a Sri Lankan visa to visit Kachchatheevu.

Jaffna Bishop Justin Gnanapragasam holds the administration responsibilities of this church.

== Annual festival ==
In 2012, it was recorded that as many as 3,768 pilgrims, including 875 women, on Saturday began their journey to attend St. Antony's Church festival here. According to sources, in 2012, as many as 35 country boats and 106 mechanised boats ferried the pilgrims, mostly from Rameswaram, Thangatchimadam and Mandapam.

== Indo-Sri Lankan Relationship through this festival ==
Permission to visit Kachchatheevu has been given to pilgrims after a gap of 27 years, since 1982. The festival which runs for 3 days remains as an umbilical cord for the Indo-Sri Lankan relationship. The priests from both India and Sri Lanka conduct the Mass and car procession. As many as 35 country boats and 106 mechanised boats ferried the pilgrims, mostly from Rameswaram. The theme of the year 2012 joint prayer by Tamil Nadu and the Jaffna Catholic Church was, war-torn Sri Lankan Tamils on either side of the Palk strait reuniting with their relatives.

This festival also gives the participants an opportunity to share hopes and renew with tradition, in an area shared harmoniously by people from both countries.

There is not a drop of drinking water on the island and the only structure is a decrepit church named after St. Antony, patron-saint of seafarers, to whom the feast is dedicated. It was put up by a prosperous fisherman in the early 20th century. But there is no shelter, no food, and nothing to sight-see, except the choppy blue waters of the Palk Straits all round.

Electricity, security, food, infrastructure, and internal transport for the devotees were all handled by the Sri Lanka Navy. It had also deployed lifeguards and medical teams for the convenience of the devotees.

== Controversy ==
Indian flags were not allowed to be carried during the festival. The fishermen's boats, which had been allowed to carry the pilgrims, could not fix the Indian flags in their boats for identification. There is also a diplomatic worry, that the illegal immigrants use this festival to get transit to Sri Lanka or India, illegally.
