= Cuba–United States Maritime Boundary Agreement =

1977 treaty between Cuba and the United States

Maritime Boundary Agreement between the United States of America and the Republic of Cuba
- Type: Boundary delimitation
- Signed: 16 December 1977
- Location: Washington, D.C., United States
- Parties: Cuba; United States
- Languages: English; Spanish

The Cuba–United States Maritime Boundary Agreement is a 1977 treaty between Cuba and the United States that set the international maritime boundary between the two states. Maritime boundary delimitation was necessary to facilitate law enforcement and resource management, and to avoid conflict, within the countries' overlapping two-hundred mile maritime zones.

The treaty was signed in Washington, D.C., on December 16, 1977. Mark B. Feldman, Deputy Legal Adviser, U.S. Department of State, signed for the United States. Olga Miranda, Legal Adviser, Cuban Foreign Ministry, signed for Cuba. The treaty stated that the boundary agreement was provisional for two years and would become permanent when both states had ratified the treaty. President Jimmy Carter transmitted the treaty to the United States Senate for advice and consent on January 19, 1978, and hearings were held by the Foreign Relations Committee on June 30, 1980. However, the Senate never voted on the treaty, so it has not yet entered into force. Pending treaty approval, Cuba and the U.S. have maintained the boundary line agreed to in the treaty provisionally by a series of executive agreements renewed every two years.
