= France–United Kingdom relations =

Bilateral relations

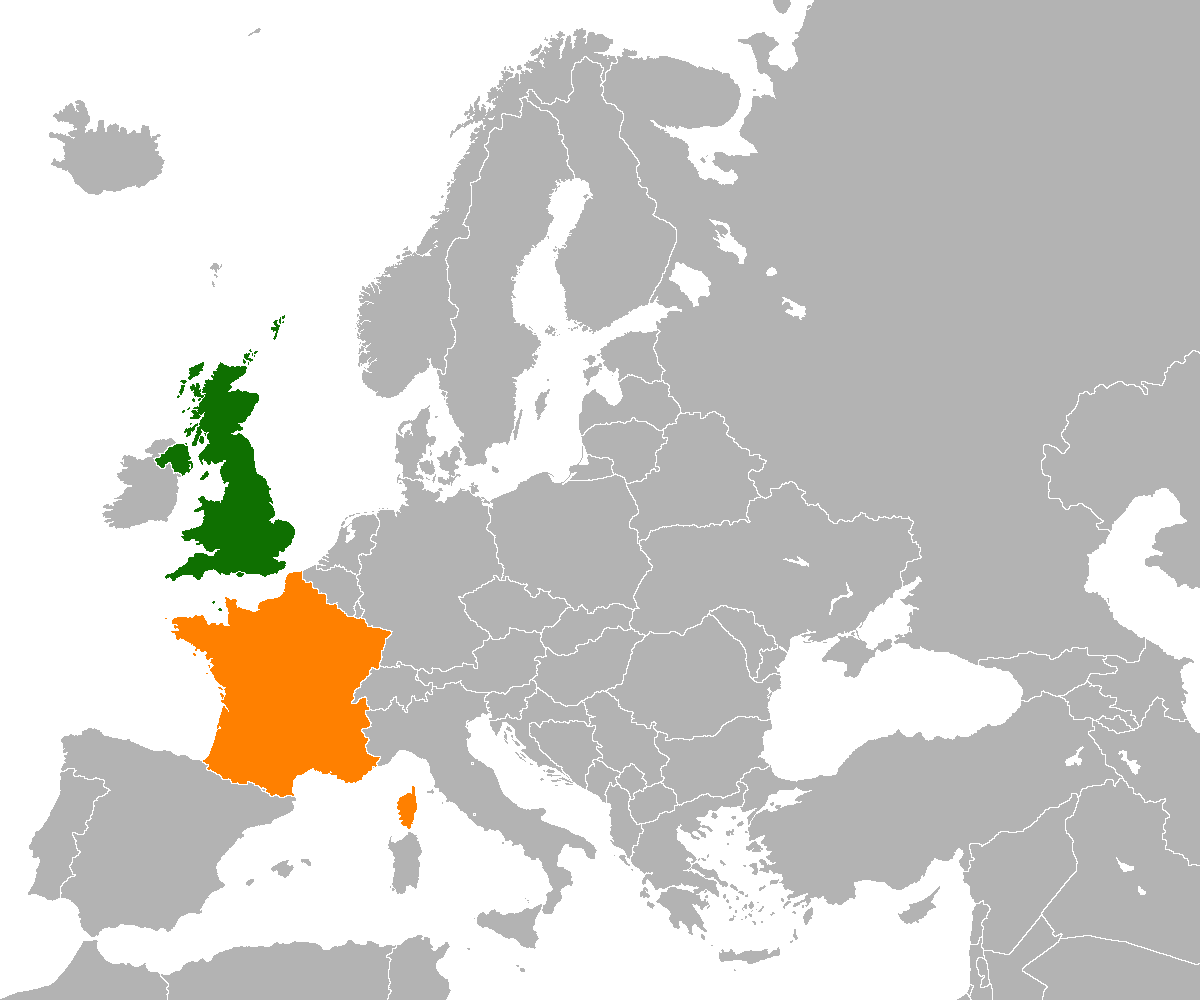

- United Kingdom: France

Diplomatic mission
- Embassy of the United Kingdom, Paris: Embassy of France, London

Envoy
- Ambassador Thomas Drew: Ambassador Hélène Tréheux-Duchêne

Map including French and British overseas territories

The historical ties between France and the United Kingdom, and the countries preceding them, are long and complex, including conquest, wars, and alliances at various points in history. The Roman era saw both areas largely conquered by Rome, whose fortifications largely remain in both countries to this day. The Norman conquest of England in 1066, followed by the long domination of the Plantagenet dynasty of French origin, decisively shaped the English language and led to early conflict between the two nations.

Throughout the Middle Ages and into the Early Modern Period, France and England were often bitter rivals, with both nations' monarchs claiming the French throne and France routinely allying against England with their other rival Scotland until the Union of the Crowns. The historical rivalry between the two nations was seeded in the Capetian-Plantagenet rivalry over the French holdings of the Plantagenets in France. After the French victory in the Hundred Years' War, England would never again establish a foothold in French territory.

Rivalry continued with many Anglo-French wars. The last major conflict between the two was the French Revolutionary and Napoleonic Wars (1793–1815), in which coalitions of European powers, financed by London, fought a series of wars against the French First Republic, the First French Empire and its client states, culminating in the defeat of Napoleon in 1815. For several decades the peace was uneasy with fear of French invasion in 1859 and during the later rivalry for African colonies. Nevertheless, peace has generally prevailed since Napoleon I, and friendly ties between the two were formally established with the 1904 Entente Cordiale, and the British and French were allied against Germany in both World War I and World War II; in the latter conflict, British armies helped to liberate occupied France from Nazi Germany.

France and the UK were key partners in the West during the Cold War, consistently supporting liberal democracy and capitalism. They were founding members of the North Atlantic Treaty Organization (NATO) defence alliance and are permanent members of the UN Security Council. France has been a member of the European Union (EU), and its predecessors, since creation as the European Economic Community in 1957. In the 1960s, relations deteriorated due to French President Charles de Gaulle's concerns over the special relationship between the UK and the United States. He repeatedly vetoed British entry into the European Communities, the predecessor to the EU, and withdrew France from NATO integrated command, arguing the alliance was too heavily dominated by the United States.

In 1973, following de Gaulle's death, the UK entered the European Communities and in 2009 France returned to an active role in NATO under the presidency of Nicolas Sarkozy. Since then, the two countries have experienced a close relationship, especially on defence and foreign policy issues; however they disagreed on several other matters, most notably the direction of the European Union. The United Kingdom left the European Union on 31 January 2020, following the referendum held on 23 June 2016, on Brexit. Relations have since deteriorated, with disagreements surrounding Brexit and the English Channel migrant crisis.

In the 21st century, France and Britain, though they have chosen different paths and share many overlooked similarities (with roughly the same population, economic size, commitment to democracy, diplomatic clout, and as heads of former global empires.), are often still referred to as "historic rivals", with a perceived ever-lasting competition. French author José-Alain Fralon characterised the relationship between the countries by describing the British as "our most dear enemies".

It is estimated that about 350,000 French people live in the UK, with approximately 200,000 Britons living in France. Both countries are members of the Council of Europe and NATO. France is a European Union member and the United Kingdom is a former European Union member.

== History ==
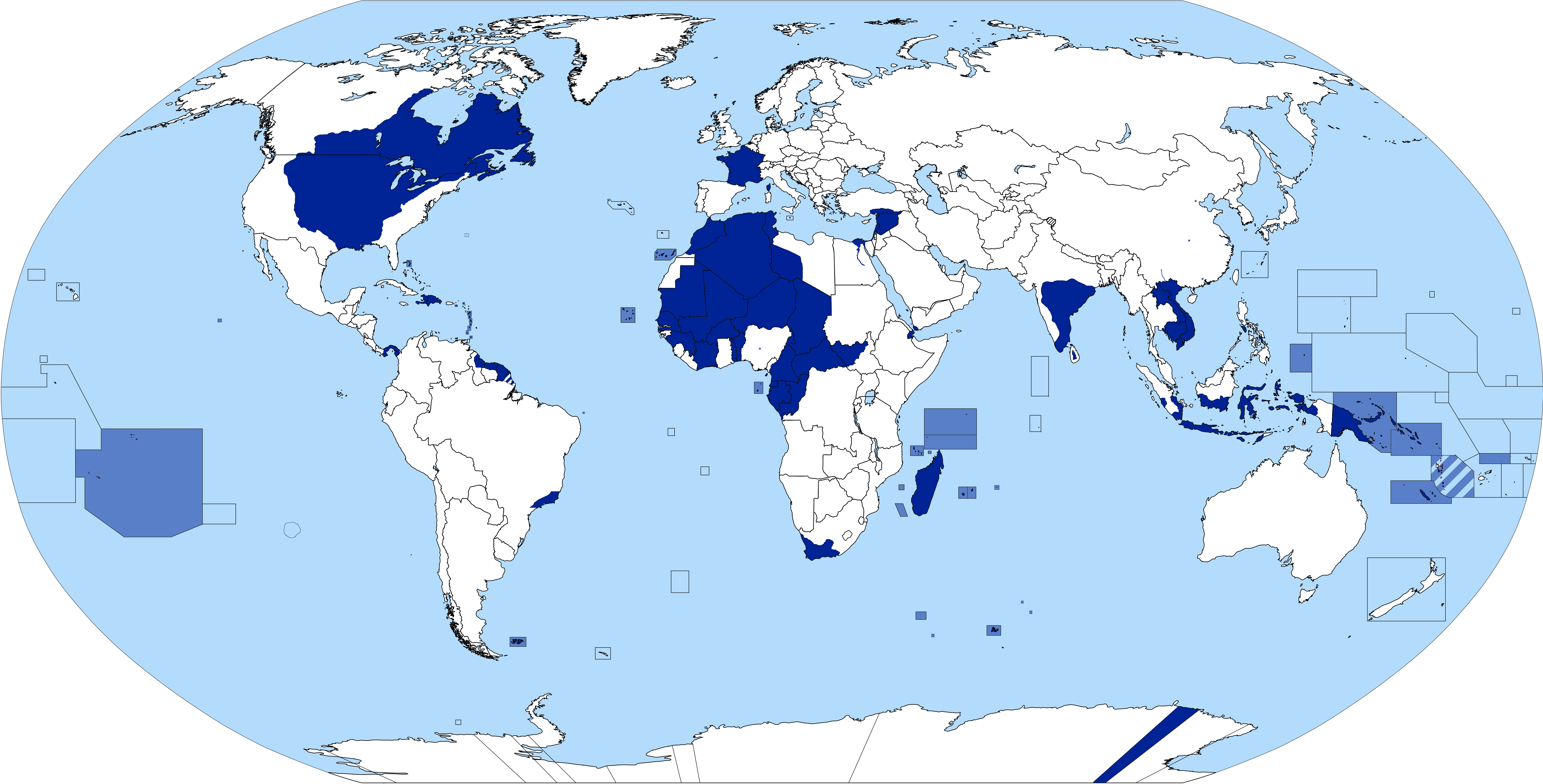
French colonial empire

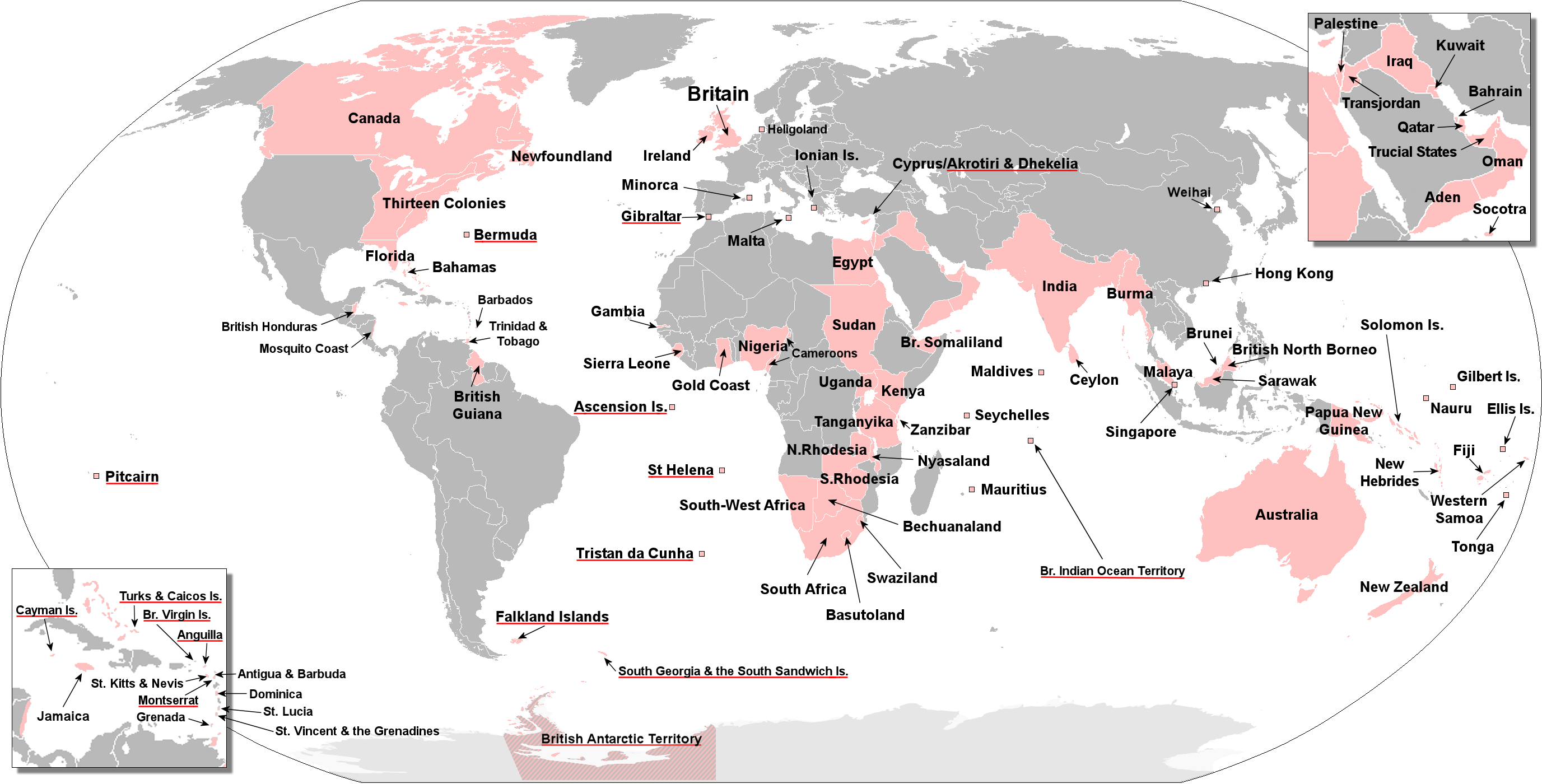
British Empire

=== 1945–1956 ===
The UK and France became close in the aftermath of World War II, as both feared the Americans would withdraw from Europe leaving them vulnerable to the Soviet Union's expanding communist bloc. The UK was successful in strongly advocating that France be given a zone of occupied Germany. Both states were amongst the five Permanent Members of the new UN Security Council, where they commonly collaborated. However, France was bitter when the United States and Britain refused to share atomic secrets with it. An American operation to use air strikes (including the potential use of tactical nuclear weapons) during the climax of the Battle of Dien Bien Phu in May 1954 was cancelled because of opposition by the British. The upshot was France developed its own nuclear weapons and delivery systems.

The Cold War began in 1947, as the United States, with strong British support, announced the Truman Doctrine to contain Communist expansion and provided military and economic aid to Greece and Turkey. Despite its large pro-Soviet Communist Party, France joined the Allies. The first move was the Franco-British alliance realised in the Dunkirk Treaty in March 1947.

==== Suez Crisis ====
In 1956, the Suez Canal, previously owned by an Anglo-French company, was nationalised by the Egyptian government. The British and the French were both strongly committed to taking the canal back by force. President Eisenhower and the Soviet Union demanded there be no invasion and both imposed heavy pressure to reverse the invasion when it came. The relations between Britain and France were not entirely harmonious, as the French did not inform the British about the involvement of Israel until very close to the commencement of military operations. The failure in Suez convinced Paris it needed its own nuclear weapons.

==== Common Market ====
Immediately after the Suez crisis Anglo-French relations started to sour again, and only since the last decades of the 20th century have they improved towards the peak they achieved between 1900 and 1940.

Shortly after 1956, France, West Germany, Italy, Belgium, the Netherlands and Luxembourg formed what would become the European Economic Community and later the European Union, but rejected British requests for membership. In particular, President Charles de Gaulle's attempts to exclude the British from European affairs during France's early Fifth Republic are now seen by many in Britain as a betrayal of the strong bond between the countries, and Anthony Eden's exclusion of France from the Commonwealth is seen in a similar light in France. The French partly feared that were the British to join the EEC they would attempt to dominate it.

Over the years, the UK and France have often taken diverging courses within the European Community. British policy has favoured an expansion of the Community and free trade while France has advocated a closer political union and restricting membership of the Community to a core of Western European states.

==== De Gaulle ====
In 1958, with France mired in a seemingly unwinnable war in Algeria, Charles de Gaulle returned to power in France. He created the Fifth French Republic, ending the post-war parliamentary system and replacing it with a strong Presidency, which became dominated by his followers—the Gaullists. De Gaulle made ambitious changes to French foreign policy—first ending the war in Algeria, and then withdrawing France from the NATO command structure. The latter move was primarily symbolic, but NATO headquarters moved to Brussels and French generals had a much lesser role.

French policy blocking British entry into the European Economic Community (EEC) was primarily motivated by political rather than economic considerations. In 1967, as in 1961–63, de Gaulle was determined to preserve France's dominance within the EEC, which was the foundation of the nation's international stature. His policy was to preserve the Community of Six while barring Britain. Although France succeeded in excluding Britain in the short term, in the longer term the French had to adjust their stance on enlargement in order to retain influence. De Gaulle feared that letting Britain into the European Community would open the way for "Anglo-Saxon" (i.e., US and UK) influence to overwhelm the France-West Germany coalition that was now dominant. On 14 January 1963, de Gaulle announced that France would veto Britain's entry into the Common Market.

=== Since 1969 ===
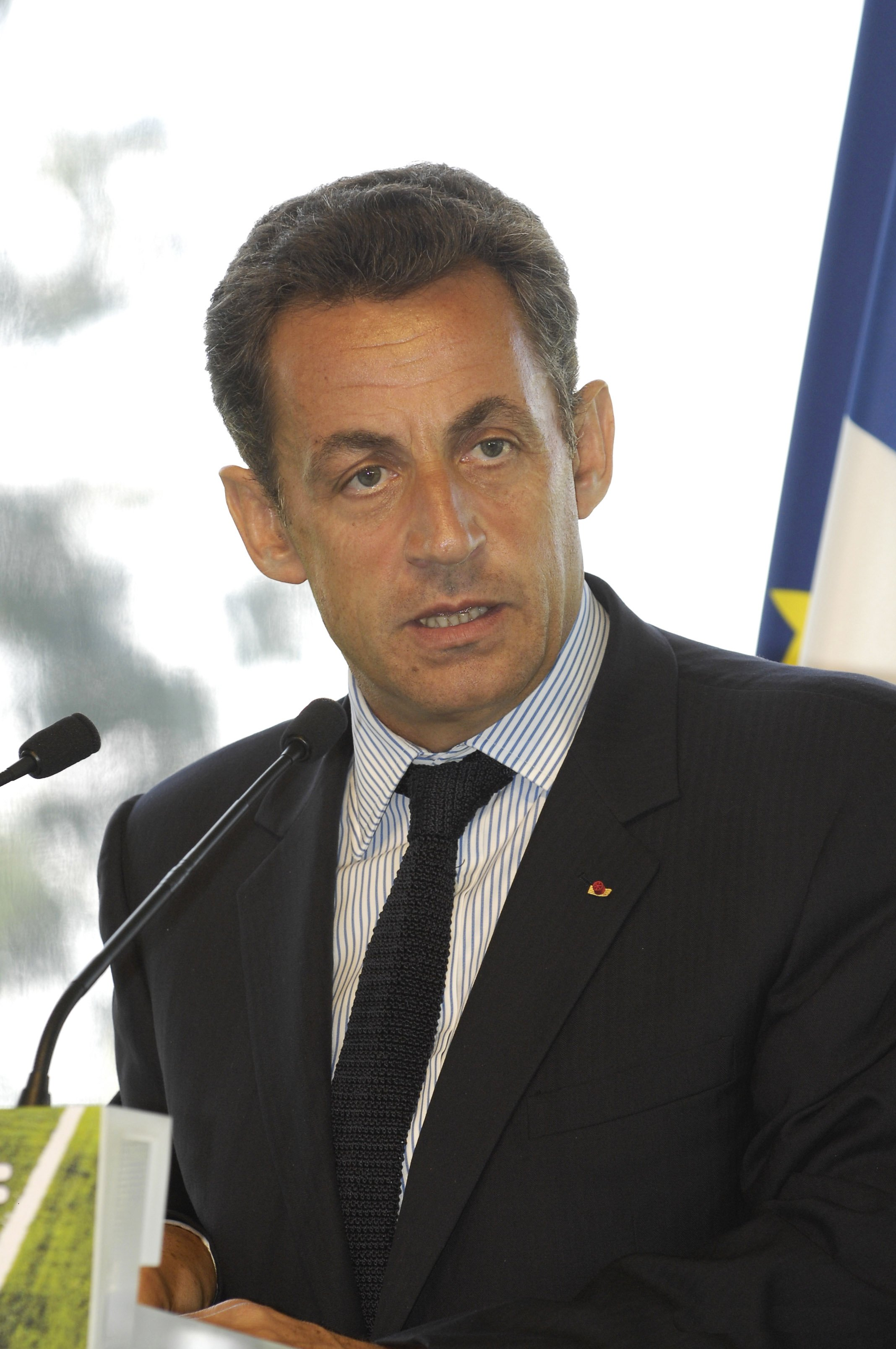
President Nicolas Sarkozy (2007–2012) tried to establish a closer relationship with the UK, than existed under his predecessors Jacques Chirac and François Mitterrand.

When de Gaulle resigned in 1969, a new French government under Georges Pompidou was prepared to open a more friendly dialogue with Britain. He felt that in the economic crises of the 1970s, Europe needed Britain. Pompidou welcomed British membership of the EEC, opening the way for the United Kingdom to join it in 1973.

The two countries' relationship was strained significantly in the lead-up to the 2003 War in Iraq. Britain and its American ally strongly advocated the use of force to remove Saddam Hussein, while France (with China, Russia, and other nations) strongly opposed such action, with French President Jacques Chirac threatening to veto any resolution proposed to the UN Security Council. However, despite such differences Chirac and then British Prime Minister Tony Blair maintained a fairly close relationship during their years in office even after the Iraq War started. Both states asserted the importance of the Entente Cordiale alliance, and the role it had played during the 20th century.

==== Sarkozy presidency ====
Following his election in 2007, President Nicolas Sarkozy attempted to forge closer relations between France and the United Kingdom: in March 2008, Prime Minister Gordon Brown said that "there has never been greater cooperation between France and Britain as there is now". Sarkozy also urged both countries to "overcome our long-standing rivalries and build together a future that will be stronger because we will be together". He also said "If we want to change Europe my dear British friends—and we Frenchmen do wish to change Europe—we need you inside Europe to help us do so, not standing on the outside." On 26 March 2008, Sarkozy had the privilege of giving a speech to both British Houses of Parliament, where he called for a "brotherhood" between the two countries and stated that "France will never forget Britain's war sacrifice" during World War II.

In March 2008, Sarkozy made a state visit to Britain, promising closer cooperation between the two countries' governments in the future.

==== Hollande presidency ====
The final months towards the end of François Hollande's tenure as president saw the UK vote to leave the EU. His response to the result was "I profoundly regret this decision for the United Kingdom and for Europe, but the choice is theirs and we have to respect it."

The then-Economy Minister and current President Emmanuel Macron accused the UK of taking the EU "hostage" with a referendum called to solve a domestic political problem of eurosceptics and that "the failure of the British government [has opened up] the possibility of the crumbling of Europe."

In contrast, the vote was welcomed by Eurosceptic political leaders and presidential candidates Marine Le Pen and Nicolas Dupont-Aignan as a victory for "freedom".

==== Macron presidency ====
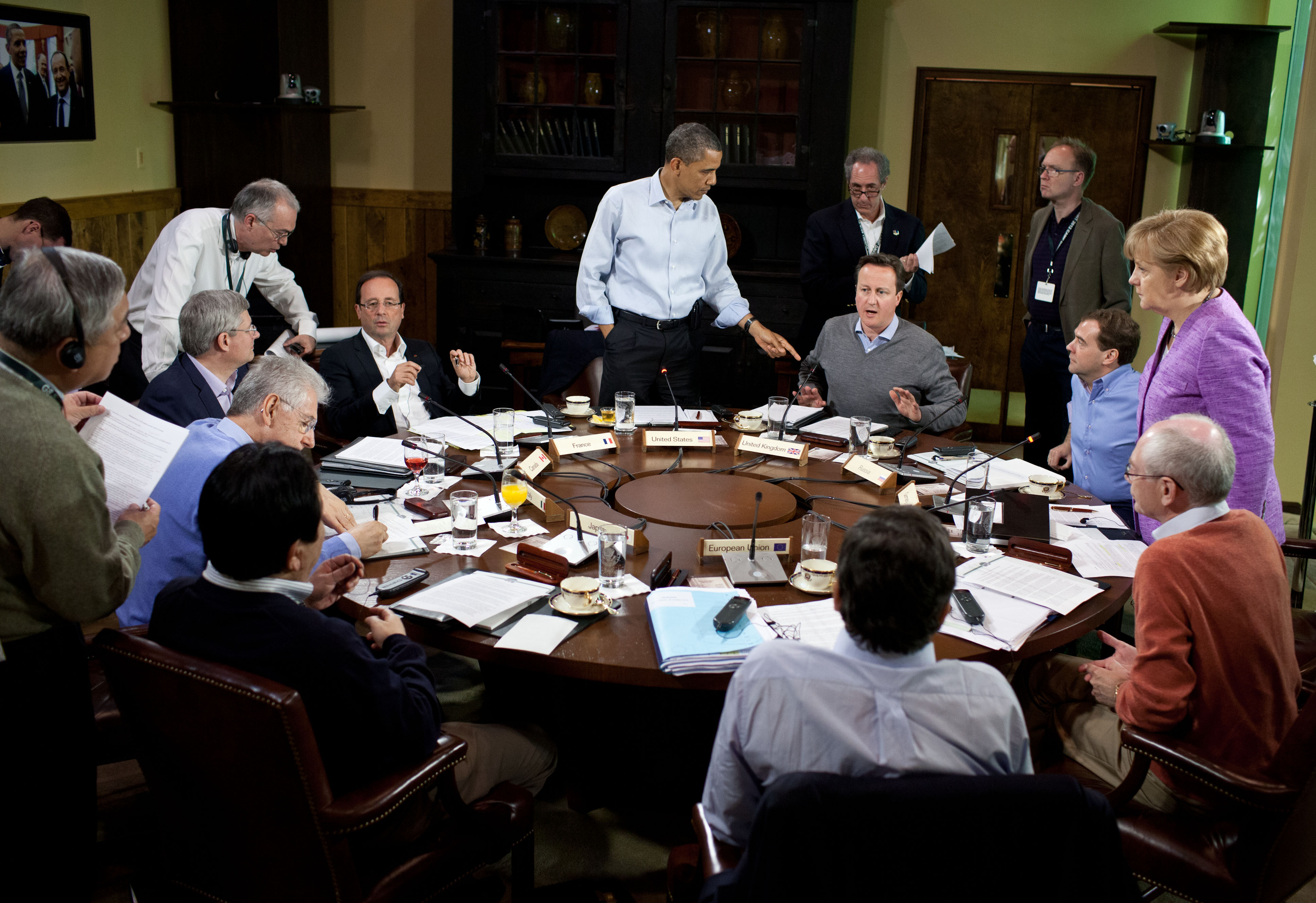
Cameron and Hollande at the G8 summit in 2012

In the aftermath of Brexit, fishing disputes, notably the 2021 Jersey dispute, have caused turbulence in relations between the two countries.

In May 2021, France threatened to cut off electricity to the British Channel Island of Jersey in a fight over post-Brexit fishing rights.

In August 2021, tensions emerged between the countries after the announcement of the AUKUS agreement between the United Kingdom, the United States, and Australia.

In October 2021, the UK Foreign Office summoned the French ambassador over "threats" made by French officials against Jersey. In November, France threatened to ban UK fishing vessels from French ports.

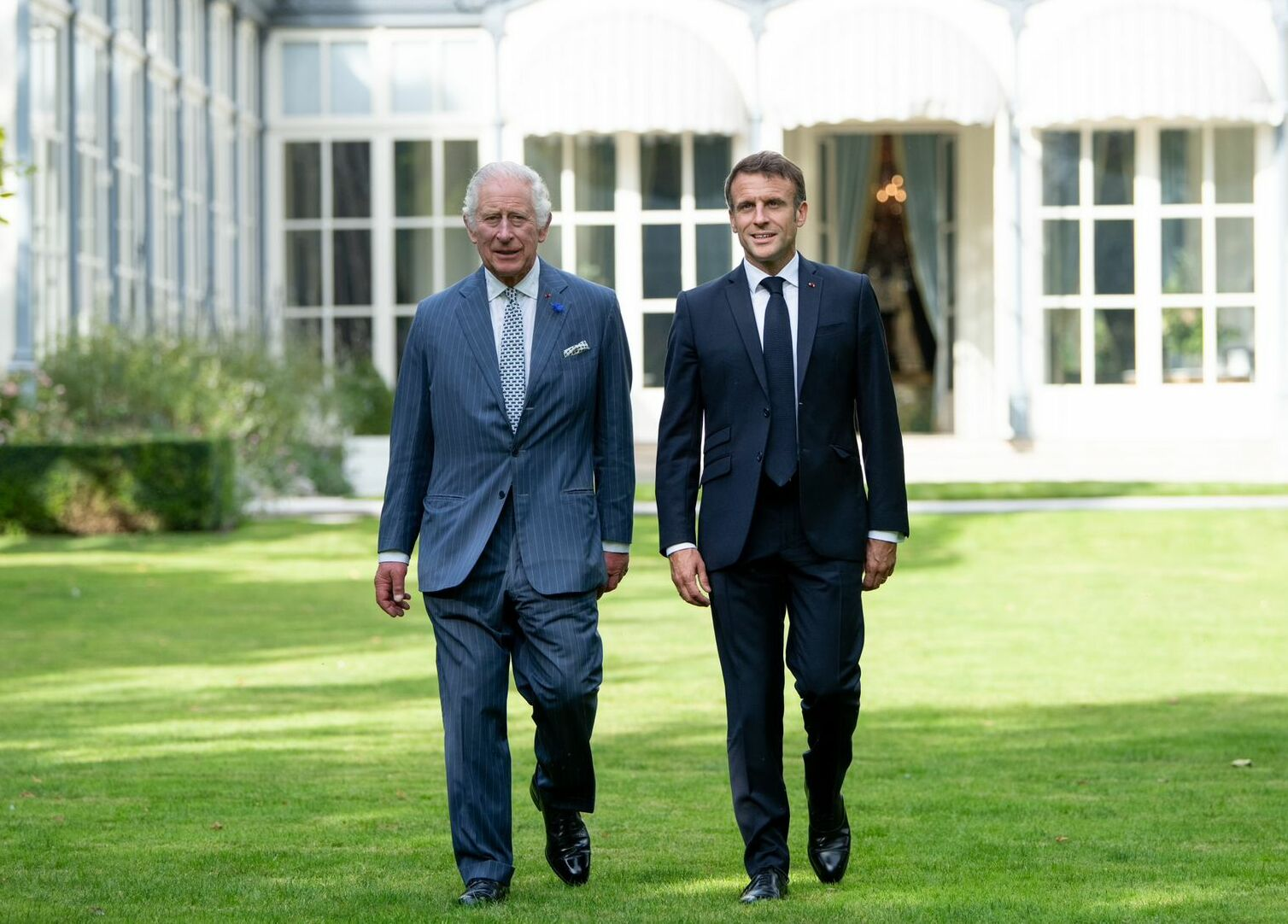
King Charles III with Macron on a state visit to France, 2023

In November 2021, relations became more stagnant after the French Foreign Minister Jean-Yves Le Drian claimed that British Prime Minister Boris Johnson is a "populist who uses all elements at his disposal to blame others for problems he faces internally". A few days later, after 27 migrants drowned in the English Channel, Prime Minister Boris Johnson tweeted a letter that was sent to French President Emmanuel Macron which had irritated him due to the letter being made public on Twitter. The French Interior Minister Gérald Darmanin cancelled a proposed meeting with British Home Secretary Priti Patel over the migrant crossings due to the row over the letter. On 6 March 2022, French Interior Minister Gerald Darmanin urged Britain to do more to assist Ukrainian refugees trapped in the French port of Calais, claiming that British officials were turning them away owing to a lack of permits or papers.

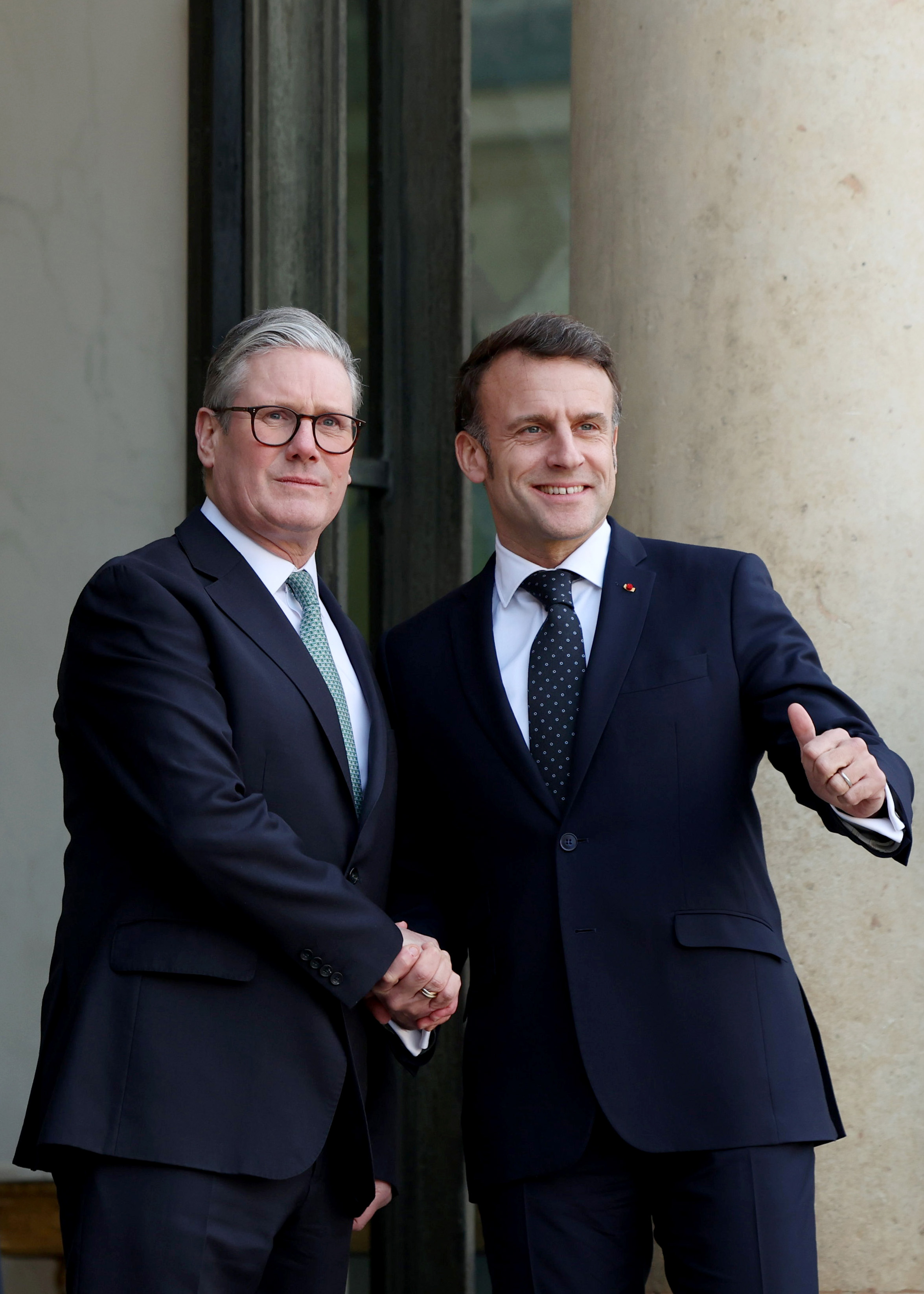
British Prime Minister Keir Starmer (2024-2026) with French President Emmanuel Macron in Paris, March 2025

On 25 August 2022, Liz Truss, the expected candidate for Prime Minister from the Conservative Party was asked if she sees Macron as a friend or a rival. Truss hesitated and replied that "The jury's out. But if I become prime minister, I'll judge him on deeds, not words". This answer brought a sharp reaction on behalf of the Labour Party when David Lammy, who serves as the party's foreign affairs spokesman, said in response that "the fact that she chose to unnecessarily insult one of our closest allies shows a lack of judgement, and that lack of capacity is a terrible and worrying thing." Macron himself responded that "the British people, Britain itself, are a friendly, strong nation and our ally, regardless of the identity of its leaders, and sometimes despite its leaders or the small mistakes they make in their attempt to impress the audience". He added: "If we, France and Britain, are unable to say whether we are friends or enemies - and the term is not neutral - then we are on the way to serious problems. If I were to be asked this question, I would not hesitate for a second - Britain is France's friend."

A bilateral summit in March 2023 between President Emmanuel Macron and Prime Minister Rishi Sunak marked a shift towards collaboration on energy, migration, and security.

The election of Prime Minister Keir Starmer in 2024 further strengthened ties, with both governments issuing a joint statement reaffirming commitments to European security and climate action.

Symbolic events, such as King Charles III's 2023 state visit to France have further reinforced bilateral ties.

== Defence cooperation ==
The two nations have a post WWII record of working together on international security measures, as was seen in the Suez Crisis and Falklands War. In her 2020 book, Johns Hopkins University SAIS political scientist Alice Pannier writes that there is a growing "special relationship" between France and the UK in terms of defence cooperation.

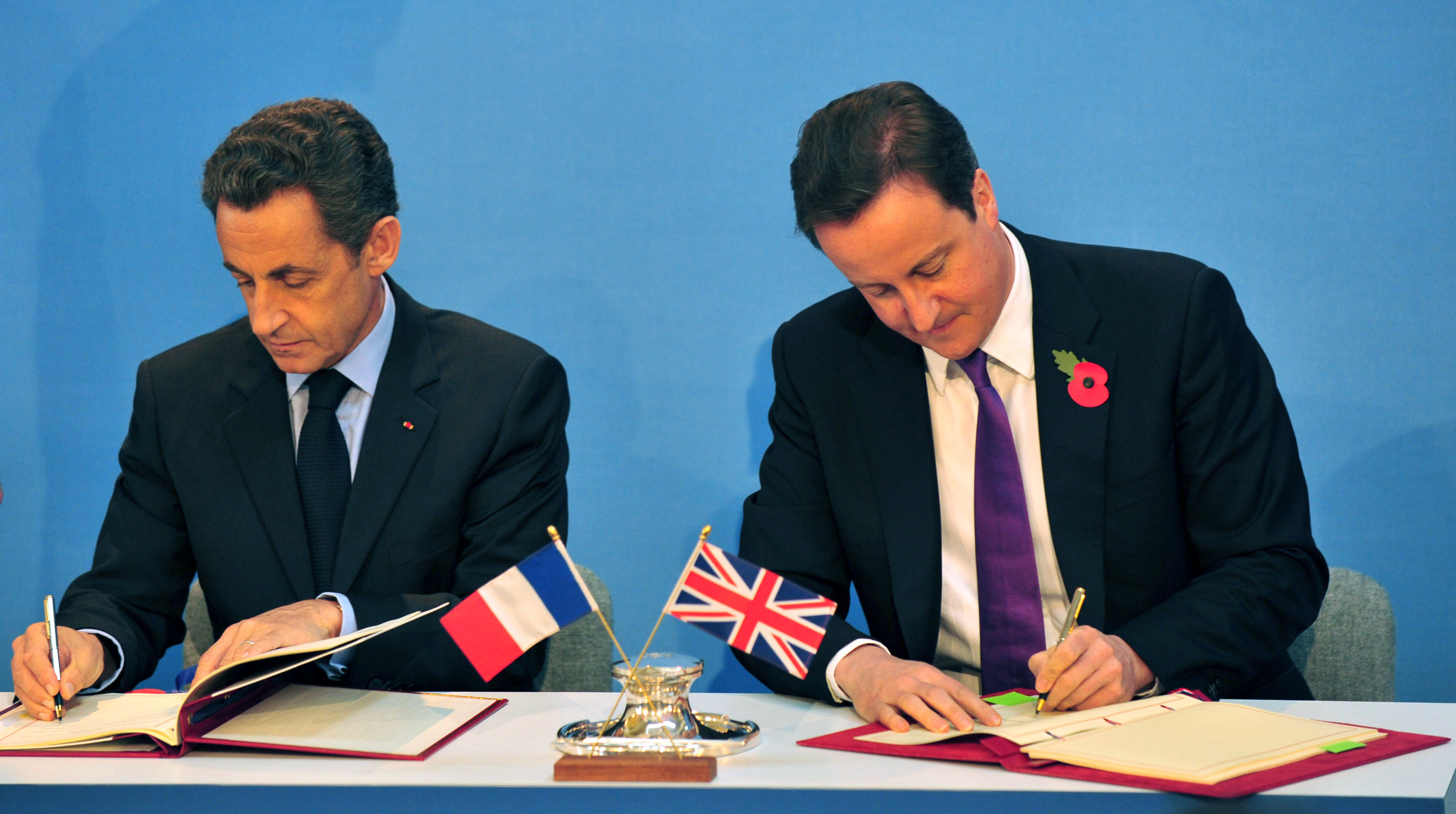
Signing of the defence co-operation treaties

On 2 November 2010, France and the UK signed two defence co-operation treaties. They provide for the sharing of aircraft carriers, a 10,000-strong joint reaction force, a common nuclear simulation centre in France, a common nuclear research centre in the UK, sharing air-refuelling tankers and joint training.

Their post-colonial entanglements have given them a more outward focus than the other countries of Europe, leading them to work together on issues such as the Libyan Civil War.

== Commerce ==
France is the United Kingdom's third-biggest export market after the United States and Germany. Exports to France rose 14.3% from £16.542 billion in 2010 to £18.905 billion in 2011, overtaking exports to the Netherlands. Over the same period, French exports to Britain rose 5.5% from £18.133 billion to £19.138 billion.

The British Foreign & Commonwealth Office estimates that 19.3 million British citizens, roughly a third of the entire population, visit France each year. In 2018, they reported 13 million trips. In 2012, the French were the biggest visitors to the UK (12%, 3,787,000) and the second-biggest tourist spenders in Britain (8%, £1.513 billion).

== Education ==
The Entente Cordiale Scholarship scheme is a selective Franco-British scholarship scheme which was announced on 30 October 1995 by British Prime Minister John Major and French President Jacques Chirac at an Anglo-French summit in London.

It provides funding for British and French students to study for one academic year on the other side of the Channel. The scheme is administered by the French embassy in London for British students, and by the British Council in France and the UK embassy in Paris for French students. Funding is provided by the private sector and foundations. The scheme aims to favour mutual understanding and to promote exchanges between the British and French leaders of tomorrow.

The programme was initiated by Sir Christopher Mallaby, British ambassador to France between 1993 and 1996.

== The sciences ==
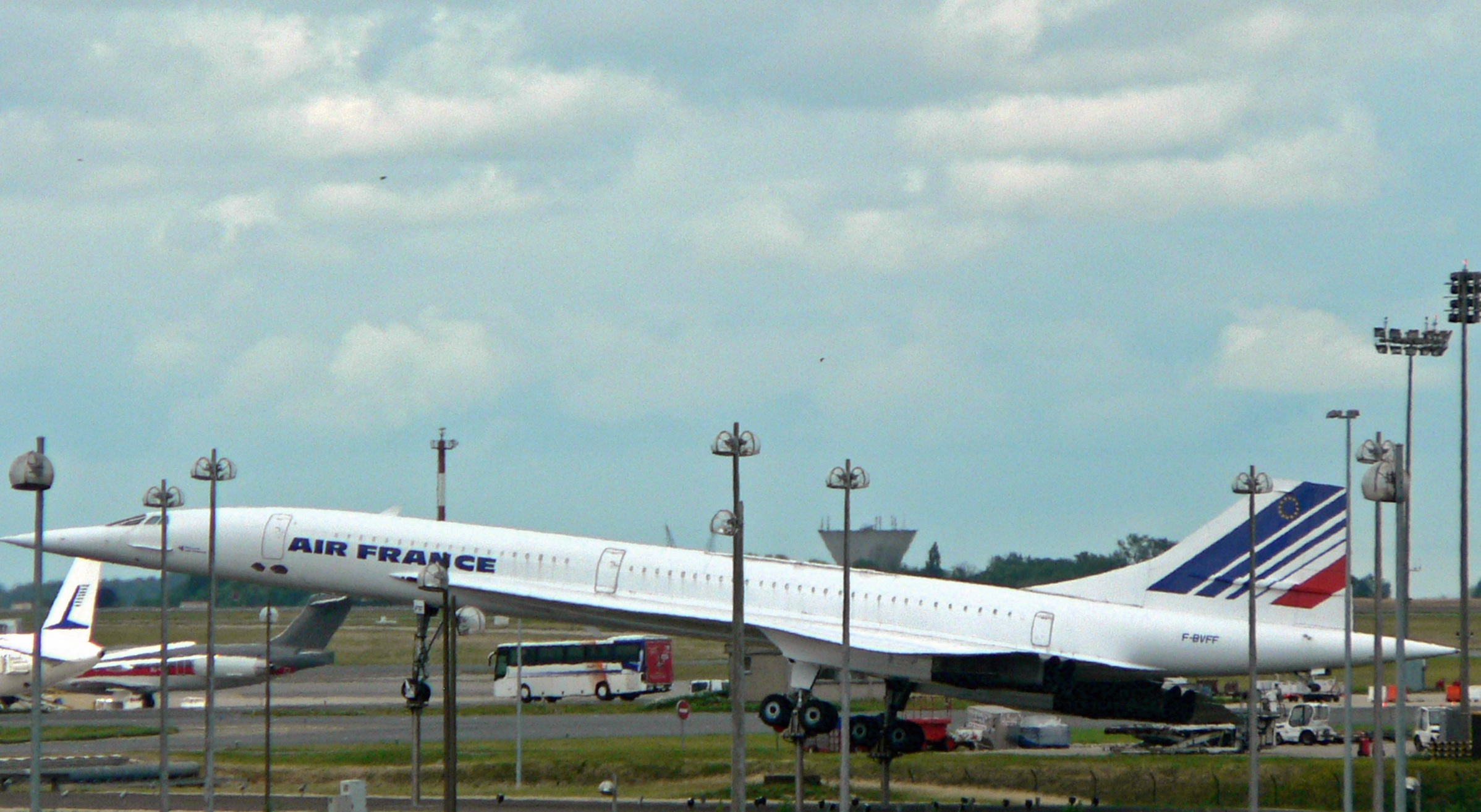
An Air France Concorde. The supersonic commercial aircraft was developed jointly by the United Kingdom and France.

The Concorde supersonic commercial aircraft was developed under an international treaty between the UK and France in 1962, and commenced flying in 1969. It was a technological success but a financial disaster and was closed down after a runway crash in 2000 and fully ended flights in 2003.

== Cultural relations ==
Over the centuries, French and British art and culture have been heavily influenced by each other. During the 19th century, numerous French artists moved to the United Kingdom, with many of them settling in London. These artists included Charles-François Daubigny, Claude Monet, Camille Pissarro, James Tissot and Alfred Sisley. This exodus would prove to have a significant influence on the development of impressionism in Britain.

Sexual euphemisms with no link to France, such as French kissing, or French letter for a condom, are used in British English slang. While in French slang, the term le vice anglais refers to either BDSM or homosexuality. French classical music has always been popular in Britain. British popular music is in turn popular in France. English literature, in particular the works of Agatha Christie and William Shakespeare, has been immensely popular in France. French artist Eugène Delacroix based many of his paintings on scenes from Shakespeare's plays. In turn, French writers such as Molière, Voltaire and Victor Hugo have been translated numerous times into English. In general, most of the more popular books in either language are translated into the other. The same can be applied for adaptations of said books; some of which have achieved considerable critical and commercial success in both territories. For example, the West End production of the musical adaptation of Hugo’s novel, Les Misérables premiered in 1985 and is still running to this very day.

=== Language ===
The Royal Coat of Arms of the United Kingdom contains two mottos in French: Honi soit qui mal y pense (Shame on whoever thinks ill of it) and Dieu et mon droit (God and my right).

The first foreign language most commonly taught in schools in Britain is French, and the first foreign language most commonly taught in schools in France is English; those are also the languages perceived as "most useful to learn" in both countries. Queen Elizabeth II of the UK was fluent in French and did not require an interpreter when travelling to French-language countries. French is a substantial minority language and immigrant language in the United Kingdom, with over 100,000 French-born people in the UK. According to a 2006 European Commission report, 23% of UK residents are able to carry on a conversation in French and 39% of French residents are able to carry on a conversation in English. French is also an official language in both Jersey and Guernsey. Both use French to some degree, mostly in an administrative or ceremonial capacity. Jersey Legal French is the standardised variety used in Jersey. However, Norman (in its local forms, Guernésiais and Jèrriais) is the historical vernacular of the islands.

Both languages have influenced each other throughout the years. According to different sources, more than 50% of all English words have a French origin, and today many French expressions have entered the English language as well. The term Franglais, a portmanteau combining the French words "français" and "anglais", refers to the combination of French and English (mostly in the UK) or the use of English words and nouns of Anglo-Saxon roots in French (in France).

Modern and Middle English reflect a mixture of Oïl and Old English lexicons after the Norman Conquest of England in 1066, when a Norman-speaking aristocracy took control of a population whose mother tongue was Germanic in origin. Due to the intertwined histories of England and continental possessions of the English Crown, many formal and legal words in Modern English have French roots. For example, buy and sell are of Germanic origin, while purchase and vend are from Old French.

=== Sports ===
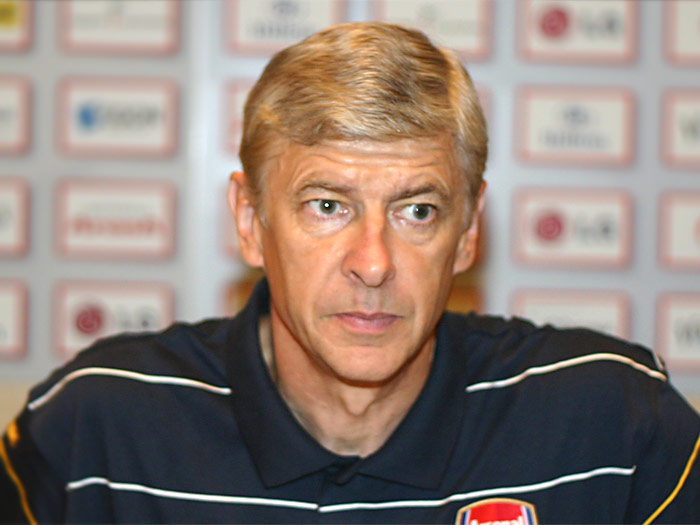
French football manager Arsène Wenger has won three Premier League titles with Arsenal F.C. using teams with significant French players.

In the sport of rugby union there is a rivalry between England and France. Both countries compete in the Six Nations Championship and the Rugby World Cup. England has the edge in both tournaments, having the most outright wins in the Six Nations (and its previous version the Five Nations), and most recently knocking the French team out of the 2003 and 2007 World Cups at the semi-final stage, although France knocked England out of the 2011 Rugby World Cup with a convincing score in their quarter final match. Though rugby is originally a British sport, French rugby has developed to such an extent that the English and French teams are now stiff competitors, with neither side greatly superior to the other. While English influences spread rugby union at an early stage to Scotland, Wales and Ireland, as well as the Commonwealth realms, French influence spread the sport outside the commonwealth, to Italy, Argentina, Romania and Georgia.

The influence of French players and coaches on British football has been increasing in recent years and is often cited as an example of Anglo-French cooperation. In particular the Premier League club Arsenal has become known for its Anglo-French connection due to a heavy influx of French players since the advent of French manager Arsène Wenger in 1996. In March 2008 their Emirates stadium was chosen as the venue for a meeting during a state visit by the French President precisely for this reason.

Many people blamed the then French President Jacques Chirac for contributing to Paris' loss to London in its bid for the 2012 Summer Olympics after he made derogatory remarks about British cuisine and saying that "only Finnish food is worse". The IOC committee which would ultimately decide to give the games to London (by four votes) had two members from Finland.

== Transport ==
=== Ferries ===
The busiest seaway in the world, the English Channel, connects ports in Great Britain such as Dover, Newhaven, Poole, Weymouth, Portsmouth and Plymouth to ports such as Roscoff, Calais, Boulogne, Dunkerque, Dieppe, Cherbourg-Octeville, Caen, St Malo and Le Havre in mainland France. Companies such as Brittany Ferries, P&O Ferries, DFDS Seaways and LD Lines operate ferry services across the Channel.

In addition, there are ferries across the Anguilla Channel between Blowing Point, Anguilla (a British Overseas Territory) and Marigot, Saint Martin (an overseas collectivity of France).

=== Channel Tunnel ===
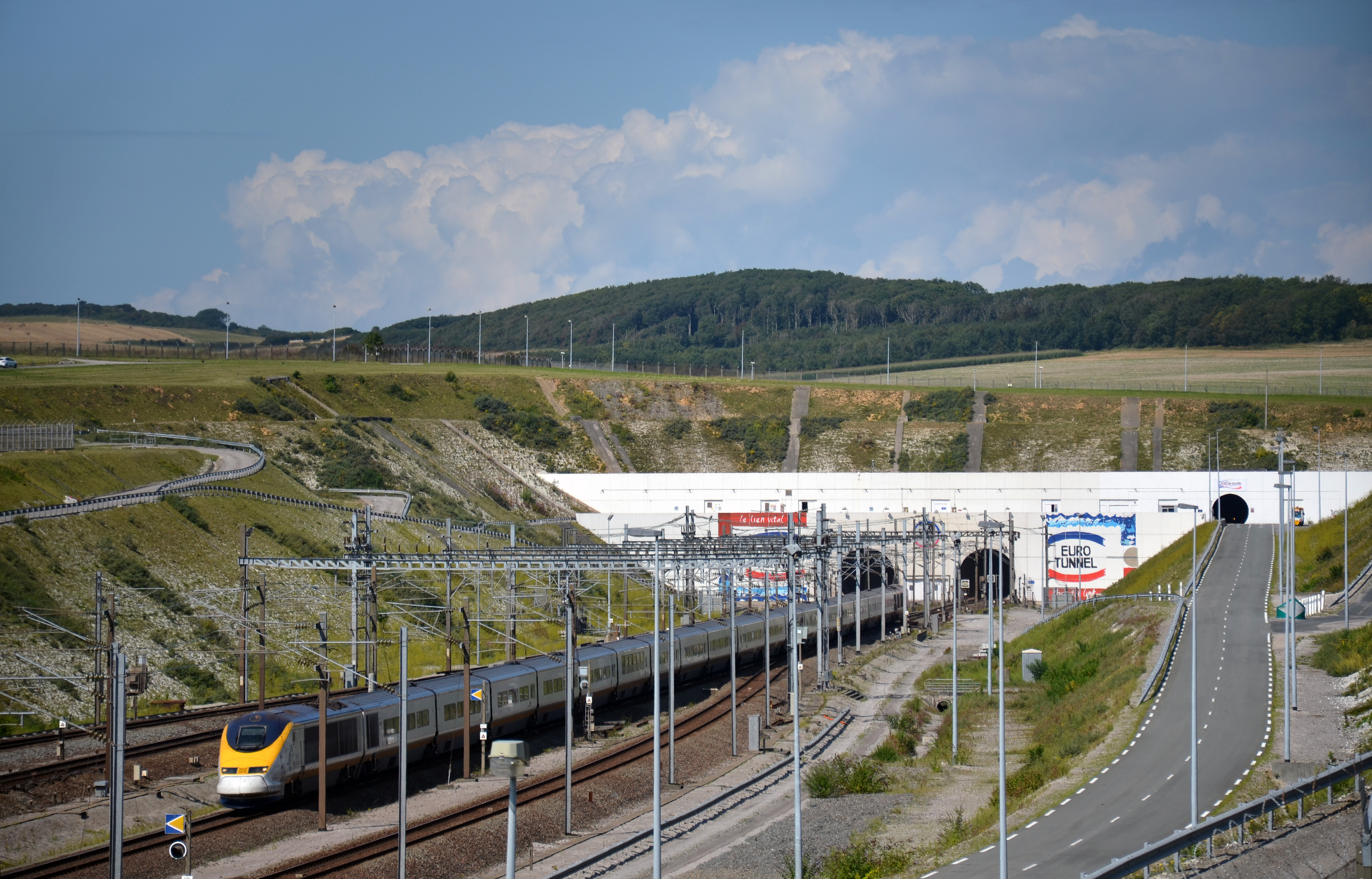
Since 1994, the Channel Tunnel (French entrance pictured) has provided a direct rail link between the United Kingdom and France.

The Channel Tunnel (French: Le tunnel sous la Manche; also referred to as the Chunnel) is a 50.5-kilometre (31.4 mi) undersea rail tunnel (linking Folkestone, Kent, in the United Kingdom with Coquelles, Pas-de-Calais, near the city of Calais in northern France) beneath the English Channel at the Strait of Dover. Ideas for a cross-Channel fixed link appeared as early as 1802, but British political and press pressure over compromised national security stalled attempts to construct a tunnel. The eventual successful project, organised by Eurotunnel, began construction in 1988 and was opened by British Queen Elizabeth II and French President François Mitterrand in a ceremony held in Calais on 6 May 1994. The same year the American Society of Civil Engineers elected the Channel Tunnel as one of the seven modern Wonders of the World.

=== Flights ===
11,675,910 passengers in 2008 travelled on flights between the United Kingdom and France.

== Irregular migration and English Channel cooperation ==
Since the 1990s France and the UK have been cooperating to face the irregular migration across the English Channel. The Le Touquet Treaty set up a system where UK border checks happen in France. This caused many migrants to establish camps in northern France. Between 1999-2002 the camps housed many migrants hoping to enter the UK, before the camps close. Even though most of the camps were closed, several kept operating, most notable the Calais Jungle, dismantled in 2016. During the 2010s, the UK funded increased French border security.

From the late 2010s, there was a sharp increase of migrants using small boats to cross the Channel to illegally enter the UK. After Brexit, the bilateral agreements expanded cooperation through increased UK funding, patrols, and joint efforts against smuggling networks, including under Rishi Sunak and Emmanuel Macron. In April 2026. both countries signed a new three year deal, at a cost of £662m, to reduce illegal migrant crossings across the English Channel. According to the deal, the UK will fund increased French enforcement, including more officers, drones, and surveillance, with some police given expanded powers to stop the small boats from crossing the Channel.

== Twin cities and towns ==
France has the most twin cities and towns in the United Kingdom.

- (United Kingdom) Aberdeen and (France) Clermont-Ferrand, Puy-de-Dôme
- (United Kingdom) Andover, Hampshire and (France) Redon, Ille-et-Vilaine
- (United Kingdom) Angmering, West Sussex and (France) Ouistreham, Calvados
- (United Kingdom) Anstruther, Fife and (France) Bapaume, Pas-de-Calais
- (United Kingdom) Aylesbury, Buckinghamshire and (France) Bourg-en-Bresse, Ain
- (United Kingdom) Aylsham, Norfolk and (France) La Chaussée-Saint-Victor, Loir-et-Cher
- (United Kingdom) Barnet, London and (France) Le Raincy, Seine-Saint-Denis
- (United Kingdom) Barrow upon Soar, Leicestershire and (France) Marans, Charente-Maritime
- (United Kingdom) Basildon, Essex and (France) Meaux, Seine-et-Marne
- (United Kingdom) Basingstoke, Hampshire and (France) Alençon, Orne
- (United Kingdom) Bath, Somerset and (France) Aix-en-Provence, Bouches-du-Rhône
- (United Kingdom) Beaminster, Dorset and (France) Saint-James, Manche
- (United Kingdom) Beccles, Suffolk and (France) Petit-Couronne, Seine-Maritime
- (United Kingdom) Birmingham, West Midlands and (France) Lyon, Metropolitan Lyon
- (United Kingdom) Blandford Forum, Dorset and (France) Mortain, Manche
- (United Kingdom) Bolton, Greater Manchester and (France) Le Mans, Sarthe
- (United Kingdom) Bourne, Lincolnshire and (France) Doudeville, Seine-Maritime
- (United Kingdom) Bridport, Dorset and (France) Saint-Vaast-la-Hougue, Manche
- (United Kingdom) Bristol, City of Bristol and (France) Bordeaux, Gironde
- (United Kingdom) Bury, Greater Manchester and (France) Angoulême, Charente
- (United Kingdom) Camberley, Surrey and (France) Sucy-en-Brie, Val-de-Marne
- (United Kingdom) Canterbury, Kent and (France) Reims, Marne
- (United Kingdom) Cardiff and (France) Nantes, Loire-Atlantique
- (United Kingdom) Chelmsford, Essex and (France) Annonay, Ardèche
- (United Kingdom) Cheltenham, Gloucestershire and (France) Annecy, Haute-Savoie
- (United Kingdom) Chester, Cheshire and (France) Sens, Yonne
- (United Kingdom) Chichester, West Sussex and (France) Chartres, Eure-et-Loir
- (United Kingdom) Chippenham, Wiltshire and (France) La Flèche, Sarthe
- (United Kingdom) Chipping Ongar, Essex and (France) Cerizay, Deux-Sèvres
- (United Kingdom) Christchurch, Dorset and (France) Saint-Lô, Manche
- (United Kingdom) Cockermouth, Cumbria and (France) Marvejols, Lozère
- (United Kingdom) Coleraine and (France) La Roche Sur Yon, Pays de ka Loire
- (United Kingdom) Colchester, Essex and (France) Avignon, Vaucluse
- (United Kingdom) Congleton, Cheshire and (France) Trappes, Yvelines
- (United Kingdom) Cowbridge, Vale of Glamorgan and (France) Clisson, Pays de la Loire
- (United Kingdom) Cowes, Isle of Wight and (France) Deauville, Calvados
- (United Kingdom) Crewe, Cheshire and (France) Mâcon, Saône-et-Loire
- (United Kingdom) Devizes, Wiltshire and (France) Mayenne, Pays de la Loire
- (United Kingdom) Dorchester, Dorset and (France) Bayeux, Calvados
- (United Kingdom) Dover, Kent and (France) Calais, Pas-de-Calais
- (United Kingdom) Droylsden, Greater Manchester and (France) Villemomble, Seine-Saint-Denis
- (United Kingdom) Dukinfield, Cheshire and (France) Champagnole, Jura
- (United Kingdom) Dundee and (France) Orléans, Loiret
- (United Kingdom) Ealing, London and (France) Marcq-en-Barœul, Nord
- (United Kingdom) East Preston, West Sussex and (France) Brou, Eure-et-Loir
- (United Kingdom) Edinburgh and (France) Nice, Alpes-Maritimes
- (United Kingdom) Elmbridge, Surrey and (France) Rueil-Malmaison, Hauts-de-Seine
- (United Kingdom) Epsom, Surrey and (France) Chantilly, Oise
- (United Kingdom) Exeter, Devon and (France) Rennes, Ille-et-Vilaine
- (United Kingdom) Exmouth, Devon and (France) Dinan, Côtes-d'Armor
- (United Kingdom) Fareham, Hampshire, and (France) Vannes, Morbihan
- (United Kingdom) Ferndown, Dorset and (France) Segré, Maine-et-Loire
- (United Kingdom) Farnborough, Hampshire and (France) Meudon, Hauts-de-Seine
- (United Kingdom) Folkestone, Kent and (France) Boulogne-sur-Mer, Pas-de-Calais
- (United Kingdom) Glasgow and (France) Marseille, Bouches-du-Rhône
- (United Kingdom) Gloucester, Gloucestershire and (France) Metz, Moselle
- (United Kingdom) Godalming, Surrey and (France) Joigny, Yonne
- (United Kingdom) Hailsham, East Sussex and (France) Gournay-en-Bray, Seine-Maritime
- (United Kingdom) Hammersmith and Fulham, London and (France) Boulogne-Billancourt, Hauts-de-Seine
- (United Kingdom) Harrogate, North Yorkshire and (France) Luchon, Haute-Garonne
- (United Kingdom) Harrold, Bedfordshire and (France) Sainte-Pazanne, Loire-Atlantique
- (United Kingdom) Harrow, London and (France) Douai, Nord
- (United Kingdom) Hastings, East Sussex and (France) Béthune, Pas-de-Calais
- (United Kingdom) Havering, London and (France) Hesdin, Pas-de-Calais
- (United Kingdom) Hereford, Herefordshire and (France) Vierzon, Cher
- (United Kingdom) Herne Bay, Kent and (France) Wimereux, Pas-de-Calais
- (United Kingdom) Hillingdon, London and (France) Mantes-la-Jolie, Yvelines
- (United Kingdom) Hitchin, Hertfordshire and (France) Nuits-Saint-Georges, Côte-d'Or
- (United Kingdom) Horsham, West Sussex and (France) Saint-Maixent-l'Ecole, Deux-Sèvres
- (United Kingdom) Hounslow, London and (France) Issy-les-Moulineaux, Hauts-de-Seine
- (United Kingdom) Inverness and (France) Saint-Valery-en-Caux, Seine-Maritime
- (United Kingdom) Ipswich, Suffolk and (France) Arras, Pas-de-Calais
- (United Kingdom) Kensington and Chelsea, London and (France) Cannes, Alpes-Maritimes
- (United Kingdom) Leeds, West Yorkshire and (France) Lille, Nord
- (United Kingdom) Leicester, Leicestershire and (France) Strasbourg, Bas-Rhin
- (United Kingdom) Lewisham, London and (France) Antony, Hauts-de-Seine
- (United Kingdom) Lichfield, Staffordshire and (France) Sainte-Foy-lès-Lyon, Lyon Metropolis
- (United Kingdom) Littlehampton, West Sussex and (France) Chennevières-sur-Marne, Val-de-Marne
- (United Kingdom) Llandeilo, Carmarthenshire and (France) Le Conquet, Finistère
- (United Kingdom) Llanelli, Carmarthenshire and (France) Agen, Lot-et-Garonne
- (United Kingdom) London and (France) Paris (this is not a twinning, since Paris is twinned only with Rome, but they are partner cities)
- (United Kingdom) Loughborough, Leicestershire and (France) Épinal, Vosges
- (United Kingdom) Maidenhead, Berkshire and (France) Saint-Cloud, Hauts-de-Seine
- (United Kingdom) Maidstone, Kent and (France) Beauvais, Oise
- (United Kingdom) Merthyr Tydfil, Merthyr Tydfil and (France) Clichy, Hauts-de-Seine
- (United Kingdom) Middlesbrough, North Yorkshire and (France) Dunkirk, Nord
- (United Kingdom) Newcastle upon Tyne, Tyne and Wear and (France) Nancy, Meurthe-et-Moselle
- (United Kingdom) Newhaven, East Sussex and (France) La Chapelle-Saint-Mesmin, Loiret
- (United Kingdom) Northampton, Northamptonshire and (France) Poitiers, Vienne
- (United Kingdom) Norwich, Norfolk and (France) Rouen, Seine-Maritime
- (United Kingdom) Oxford, Oxfordshire and (France) Grenoble, Isère
- (United Kingdom) Peterborough, Cambridgeshire and Bourges, France,Cher
- (United Kingdom) Perth and (France) Cognac, Charente
- (United Kingdom) Plymouth, Devon and (France) Brest, Finistère
- (United Kingdom) Portsmouth, Hampshire and (France) Caen, Calvados
- (United Kingdom) Poole, Dorset and (France) Cherbourg-Octeville, Manche
- (United Kingdom) Preston, Lancashire and (France) Nîmes, Gard
- (United Kingdom) Ramsgate, Kent and (France) Conflans-Sainte-Honorine, Yvelines
- (United Kingdom) Reigate, Surrey and (France) Brunoy, Essonne
- (United Kingdom) Richmond upon Thames, London and (France) Fontainebleau, Seine-et-Marne
- (United Kingdom) Rochdale, Greater Manchester and (France) Tourcoing, Nord
- (United Kingdom) Rotherham, South Yorkshire and (France) Saint-Quentin, Aisne
- (United Kingdom) Royston, Hertfordshire and (France) La Loupe, Eure-et-Loir
- (United Kingdom) Borough of Runnymede, Surrey and (France) Joinville-le-Pont, Val-de-Marne
- (United Kingdom) Salford, Greater Manchester and (France) Clermont-Ferrand, Puy-de-Dôme
- (United Kingdom) Salisbury, Wiltshire and (France) Saintes, Charente-Maritime
- (United Kingdom) Sawbridgeworth, Hertfordshire and (France) Bry-sur-Marne, Val-de-Marne
- (United Kingdom) Selby, North Yorkshire and (France) Carentan, Manche
- (United Kingdom) Sherborne, Dorset and (France) Granville, Manche
- (United Kingdom) City of Southampton, Hampshire and (France) Le Havre, Seine-Maritime
- (United Kingdom) Southborough, Kent and (France) Lambersart, Nord
- (United Kingdom) Spelthorne, Surrey and (France) Melun, Seine-et-Marne
- (United Kingdom) St Albans, Hertfordshire and (France) Nevers, Nièvre
- (United Kingdom) Stalybridge, Greater Manchester and (France) Armentières, Nord
- (United Kingdom) Stevenage, Hertfordshire and (France) Autun, Saône-et-Loire
- (United Kingdom) Stockport, Greater Manchester and (France) Béziers, Hérault
- (United Kingdom) Sturminster Newton, Dorset and (France) Montebourg, Manche
- (United Kingdom) Sunderland, Tyne and Wear and (France) Saint-Nazaire, Loire-Atlantique
- (United Kingdom) Sutton, London and (France) Gagny, Seine-Saint-Denis
- (United Kingdom) Taunton, Somerset and (France) Lisieux, Calvados
- (United Kingdom) Truro, Cornwall and (France) Morlaix, Finistère
- (United Kingdom) Vale of White Horse, Oxfordshire and (France) Colmar, Haut-Rhin
- (United Kingdom) Verwood, Dorset and (France) Champtoceaux, Maine-et-Loire
- (United Kingdom) Waltham Forest, London and (France) Saint-Mandé, Val-de-Marne
- (United Kingdom) Ware, Hertfordshire and (France) Cormeilles-en-Parisis, Val d'Oise
- (United Kingdom) Wareham, Dorset and (France) Conches-en-Ouche, Eure
- (United Kingdom) Watford, Hertfordshire and (France) Nanterre, Hauts-de-Seine
- (United Kingdom) Wellington, Shropshire and (France) Châtenay-Malabry, Hauts-de-Seine
- (United Kingdom) Wembury, Devon and (France) Locmaria-Plouzané, Finistère
- (United Kingdom) Wetherby, West Yorkshire and (France) Privas, Ardèche
- (United Kingdom) Weymouth and Portland, Dorset and (France) Louviers, Eure
- (United Kingdom) Whitstable, Kent and (France) Dainville, Pas-de-Calais
- (United Kingdom) Wigan, Greater Manchester and (France) Angers, Maine-et-Loire
- (United Kingdom) Wimborne Minster, Dorset and (France) Valognes, Manche
- (United Kingdom) Winchester, Hampshire and (France) Laon, Aisne
- (United Kingdom) Windsor, Berkshire and (France) Neuilly-sur-Seine, Hauts-de-Seine
- (United Kingdom) Metropolitan Borough of Wirral, Merseyside and (France) Lorient, Morbihan and Gennevilliers, Hauts-de-Seine
- (United Kingdom) Woking, Surrey and (France) Le Plessis-Robinson, Hauts-de-Seine
- (United Kingdom) York, North Yorkshire and (France) Dijon, Côte-d'Or

There are lists of twinnings (including those to towns in other countries) at List of twin towns and sister cities in France and at List of twin towns and sister cities in the United Kingdom.

== Resident diplomatic missions ==
- France has an embassy in London and a consulate-general in Edinburgh.
- The United Kingdom has an embassy in Paris and consulates in Bordeaux and Marseille and a trade office in Lyon.
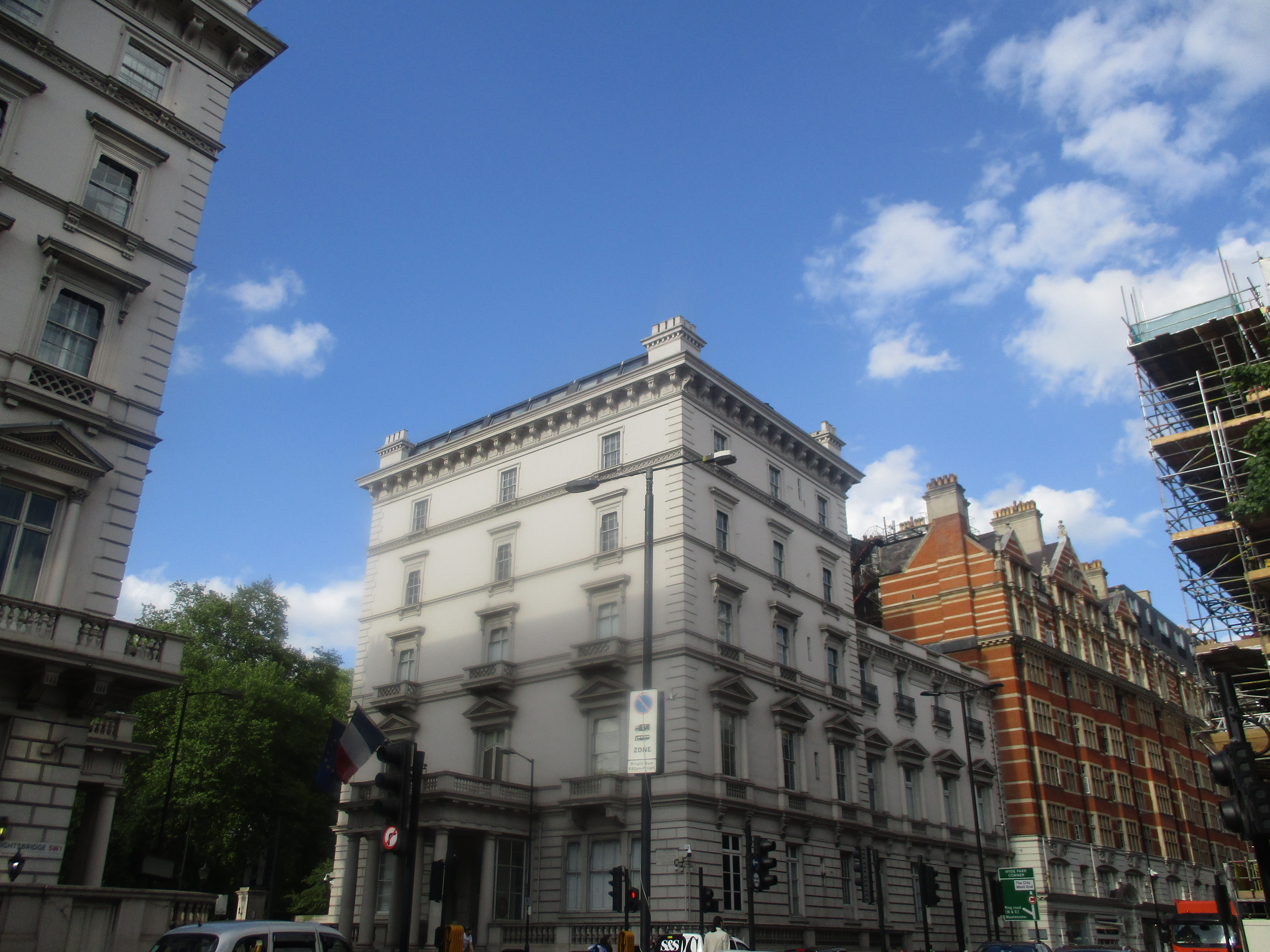
Embassy of France in London

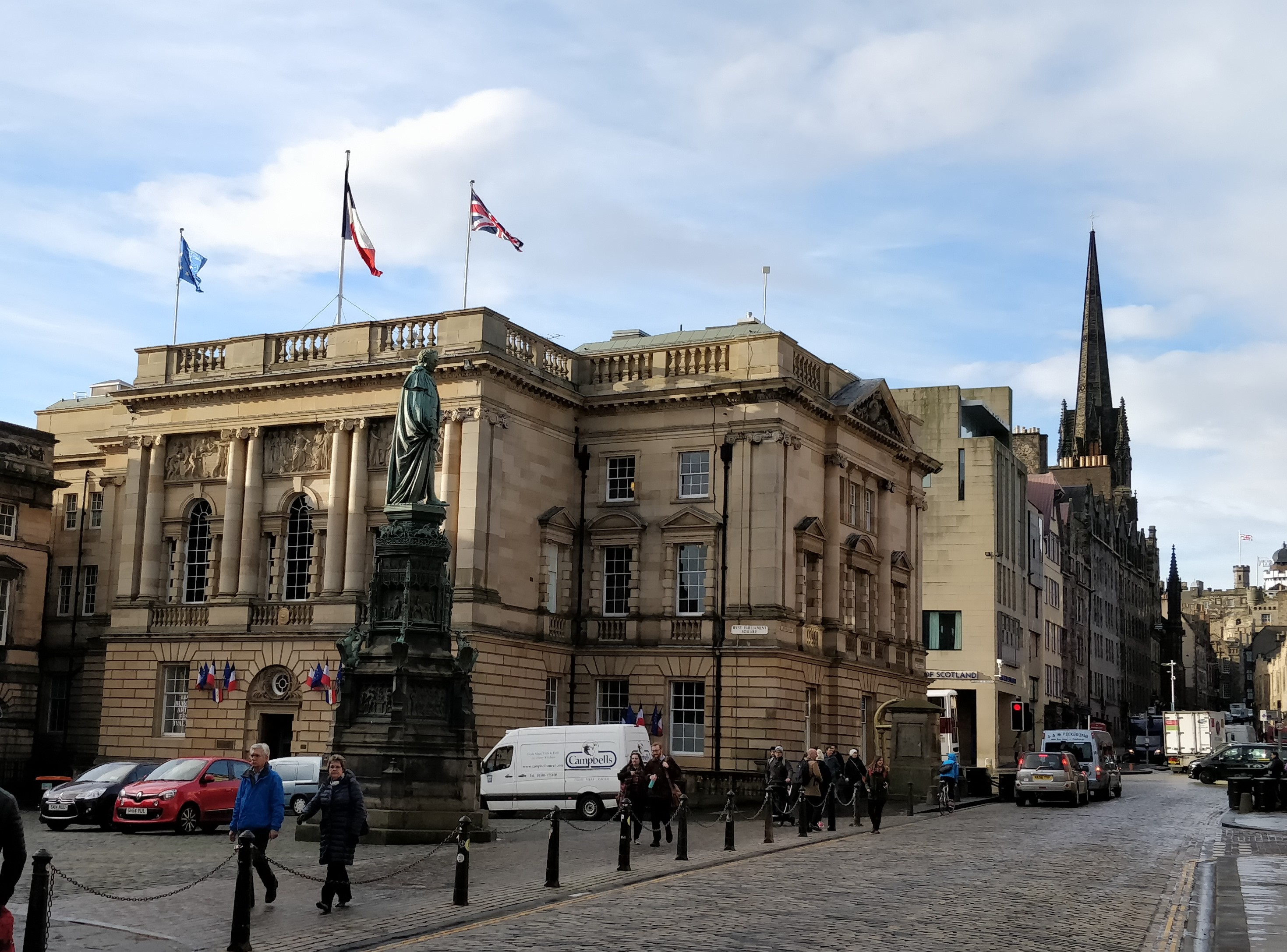
Consulate-General of France in Edinburgh

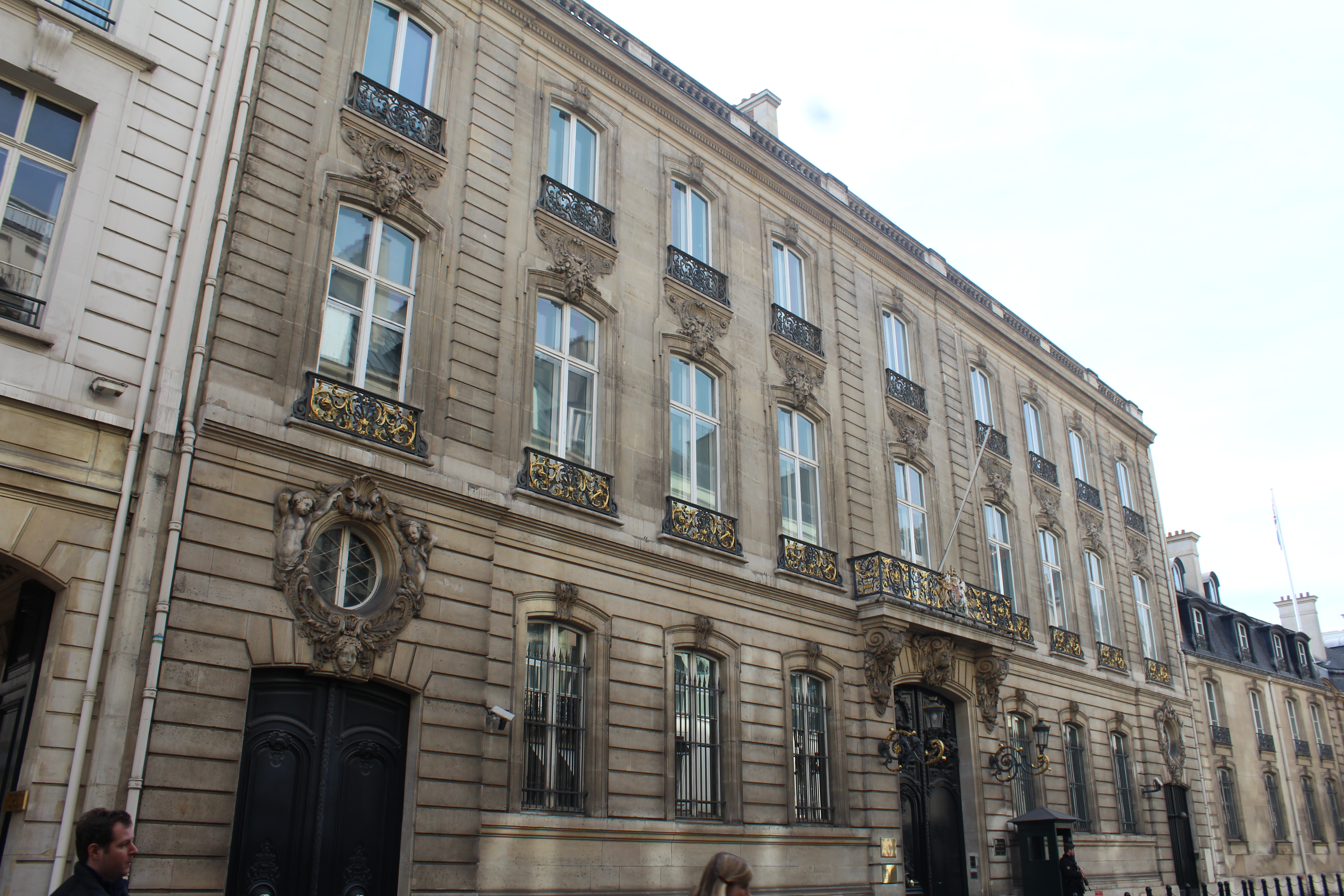
Embassy of the United Kingdom in Paris

== See also ==
- Angevin Empire
- Anglo-French War (disambiguation)
- History of French foreign relations
- Auld Alliance, between France and Scotland
- Common Security and Defence Policy
- Embassy of the United Kingdom, Paris
- English claims to the French throne
- Entente cordiale
- Entente Cordiale Scholarships
- Franco-British Union
- French migration to the United Kingdom
- Hundred Years' War
- List of British French
- List of ambassadors from the Kingdom of England to France (up to 1707)
- List of ambassadors of Great Britain to France (from 1707 to 1800)
- List of ambassadors of the United Kingdom to France (since 1800)
- List of Ambassadors of France to the United Kingdom (since 1800)
- Military history of England
- Military history of France
- Perfidious Albion
- Second Hundred Years' War
- SEPECAT Jaguar
- Triple Entente
- 1983 France–United Kingdom Maritime Boundary Convention
- 1996 France–United Kingdom Maritime Delimitation Agreements
- EU–UK relations
- European Union–NATO relations
- France–UK border
- English Channel migrant crossings (2018–present)
- United Kingdom–France one in, one out plan
