= Anguilla Channel =

Strait in the Caribbean Sea

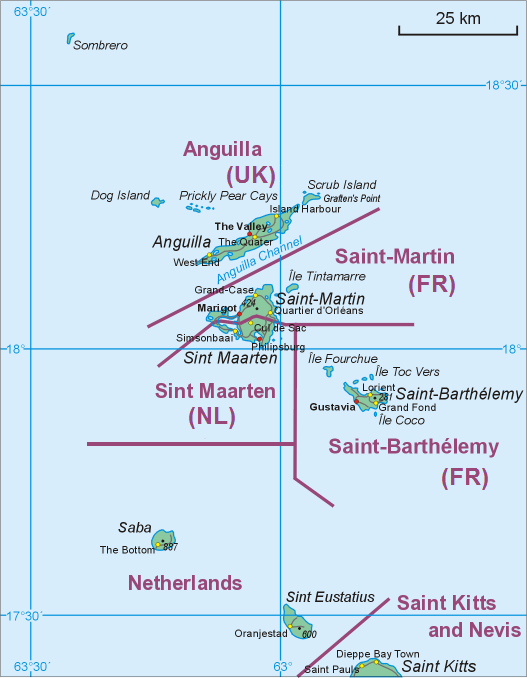

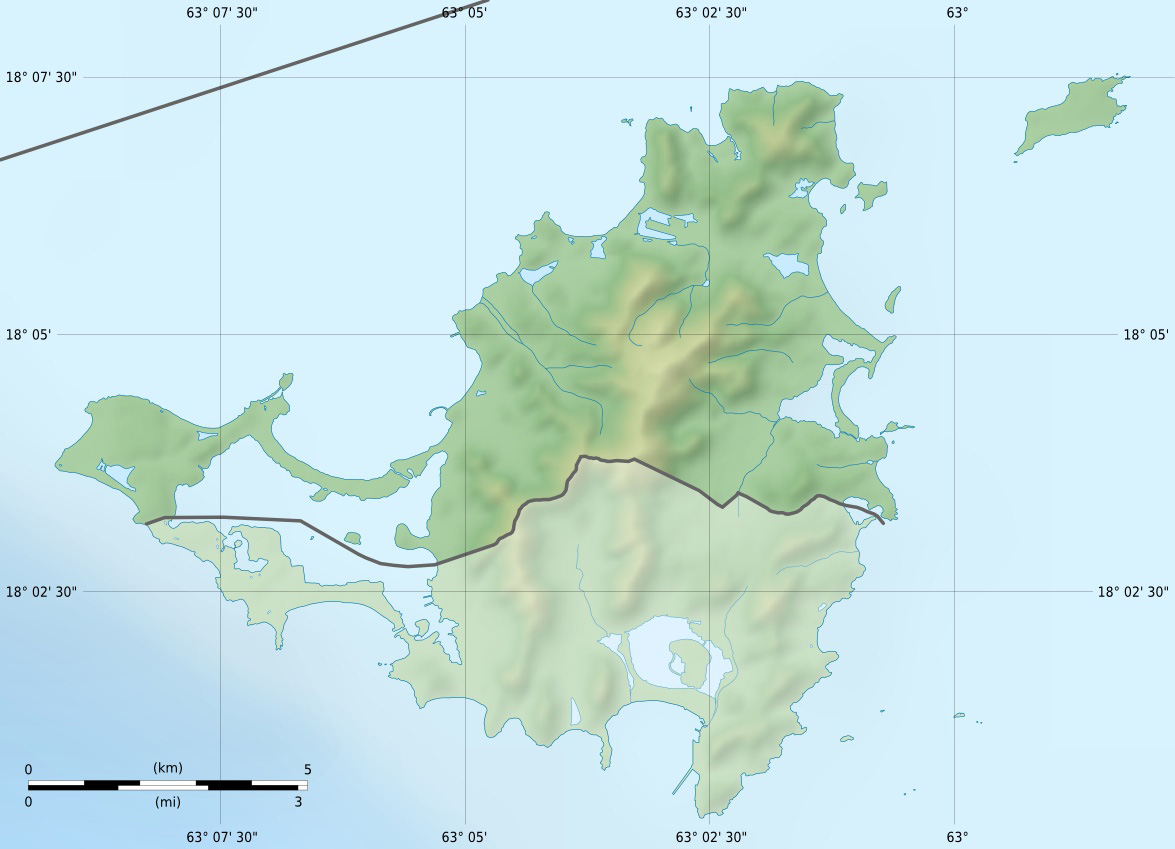
- Location within Saint-Martin Location within Lesser Antilles Location within the Caribbean
- Location: Caribbean
- Coordinates: 18°8′N 63°5′W
- Basin countries: Anguilla (United Kingdom); Saint Martin (France)
- Settlements: Grand Case, Marigot, Blowing Point

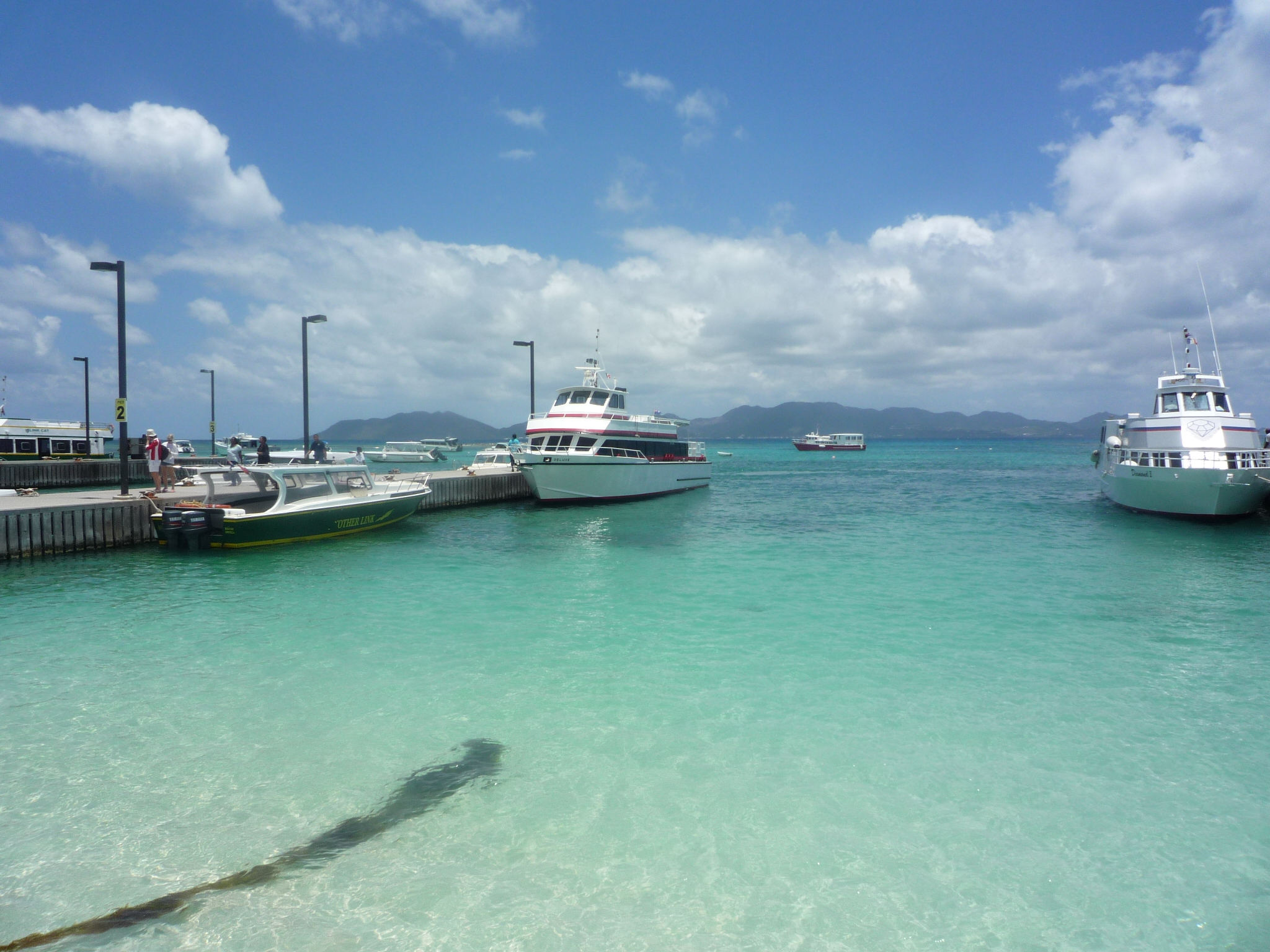
Blowing Point Ferry Terminal facing the Anguilla Channel

The Anguilla Channel (French: Canal d'Anguilla) is a strait in the Caribbean Sea. It separates the island of Anguilla (a British Overseas Territory) in the north from the Collectivity of Saint Martin, an overseas collectivity of France on the island of Saint Martin, in the south. The channel is around 8 kilometres (5.0 mi) wide with a navigable passage at least 18.3 metres (60 ft) deep. It is crossed by ferry services linking the two islands.

== Geography ==
The Anguilla Channel lies between the islands of Anguilla , to its north, and Saint Martin to the south, in the Leeward Islands group of the Lesser Antilles. It is around 8 kilometres (5.0 mi) wide. The 1996 France–United Kingdom Maritime Delimitation Agreements demarcated the maritime border in the channel on the principle of equidistance; through the channel the border is a straight line between two mutually-agreed points.

There are steep coral reefs that extend 0.2 miles (0.32 km) offshore of Anguilla but the channel is free of isolated dangers and has a fairway (navigable channel) depth of at least 18.3 metres (60 ft). Rendezvous Bay on the south-west of Anguilla offers a safe refuge for smaller vessels in the channel. In the Age of Sail, vessels navigating the channel to be careful not to leave Creole Rock off the north of Saint Martin as a lee shore and to avoid the submerged Spanish Rock off the island's northern tip.

== Ecology ==
A coral reef in the channel known as Chris's Reef was found in 2009. It contains the remains of automotive vehicles which may have been destroyed by Hurricane Luis in 1995 and subsequently placed into the reef for disposal.

== Infrastructure ==
There is a regular ferry service between Blowing Point, Anguilla and Marigot, Saint Martin. The ride is 20-25 minutes long. The route is the principle means of accessing Anguilla, as its Clayton J. Lloyd International Airport handles limited commercial traffic; more than 90% of persons entering Anguilla come by sea. Principally this is by the ferry from the Marigot French portion of Saint Martin but some private shuttle services operate from Simpson Bay in Dutch Sint Maarten. The "Christmas Winds", trade winds in the December to March season, can cause 4–6 feet (1.2–1.8 m) swells in the channel that cam make travel uncomfortable for passengers but only rarely require cancellation of crossings.

The channel is covered by cellular networks from the adjacent islands.

== See also ==
- Guadeloupe Passage
