= Julian Bullard =

British diplomat (1928–2006)

Sir Julian Bullard GCMG

British Ambassador to West Germany
- In office 1984–1988
- Monarch: Elizabeth II
- Prime Minister: Margaret Thatcher
- Preceded by: Sir Jock Taylor
- Succeeded by: Sir Christopher Mallaby

Personal details
- Born: 8 March 1928 Athens, Greece
- Died: 25 May 2006 (aged 78) Oxford, England
- Spouse: Margaret Stephens (m. 1954)
- Children: 4
- Education: Dragon School; Rugby School
- Alma mater: Magdalen College, Oxford

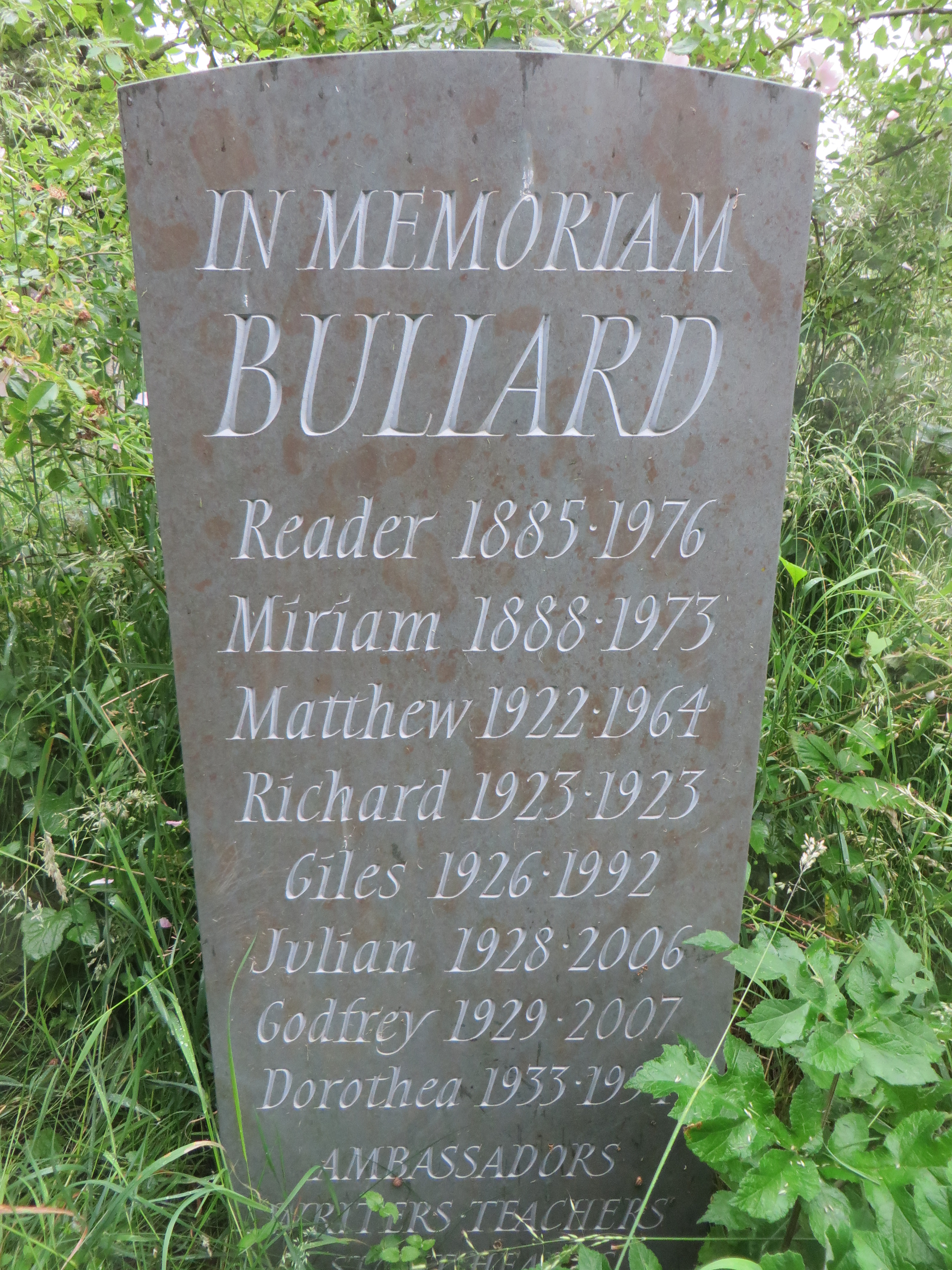
"In Memoriam Bullard" memorial stone in Holywell Cemetery, Oxford, England

Sir Julian Leonard Bullard GCMG (8 March 1928 – 25 May 2006) was a British diplomat and Pro-Chancellor of the University of Birmingham.

He was employed at Her Majesty's Diplomatic Service from 1953 until 1988, the ambassador to Bonn in the mid-1980s as well as heading Britain's relations with Soviet Russia during the early 1970s under the government of Ted Heath. He is noted for his expulsion of 105 KGB personnel from London, as well as his stance on nuclear weapons.

== Career ==
=== Early life ===
Bullard was born in Athens, Greece, but brought up in Oxford (one of his brothers being the diplomat Sir Giles Bullard). He was educated at the Dragon School in Oxford and then Rugby School, where he won a scholarship to Magdalen College, University of Oxford. His father, Sir Reader Bullard, formerly Ambassador in Iran, encouraged him to enter the Foreign Service, and he came first in the competitive examination. However he had first to complete two years national service. While at the Rifle Brigade barracks in Winchester he was awarded a fellowship at All Souls College at Oxford. Later, he was promoted to Lieutenant and stationed in Germany.

=== Germany and the KGB ===
In his early career from 1953 until 1971, he was sent to Vienna, Austria, and the Middle East. In the post-Six-Day War climate, he was made head of the East European and Soviet department of the Foreign Office. At this time, KGB infiltration was rife in London, and Bullard is credited with devising the strategy which resulting in the expulsion of 105 KGB spies from the capital in the 1970s. Bullard had an aptitude for languages and during his service he became fluent in Arabic, Russian and German.

From 1975, he was sent to Bonn, in West Germany, as a minister, returning there in 1984 as ambassador. During this time, he was one of many defending NATO's use of the Pershing missile to counter the Soviet nuclear threat.

In the 1975 Birthday Honours, Bullard was appointed a Companion of the Order of St Michael and St George (CMG),, in the 1982 Birthday Honours he was promoted to Knight Commander of the Order (KCMG), and on appointment as ambassador in Bonn he was promoted to Knight Grand Cross of the Order (GCMG) in the 1987 New Year Honours.

=== Retirement from the Foreign Office ===
Bullard had retired before the fall of the Berlin Wall in 1989. He was nominated by the Privy council to join the Council of the University of Birmingham and in 1989 was elected chairman, a post which he held, alongside the post of Pro-Chancellor, until 1994. He was instrumental in creating the university's Institute for European Law and the Institute for German Studies.

At the time of his retirement, Bullard began suffering from Parkinson's disease. He continued to be active in protest against the policies of Tony Blair and the war in Iraq. He died in 2006 in Oxford, and was survived by his wife Margaret Stephens, whom he married in 1954, and his two sons and two daughters.

== Published works ==
- Europe in the 1990s, W.H. Smith Group, 1991.
- Inside Stalin's Russia, Day Books, 2000.

Diplomatic posts
Preceded by Sir Jock Taylor	British Ambassador to West Germany; 1984–1988	Succeeded by Sir Christopher Mallaby
