= Foreign-language influences in English =

According to one study, the percentages of modern English words derived from each of various languages are as follows: * Latin (including scientific/medical/legal terms), ~29%; * French or Anglo-Norman, ~29%; * Germanic, ~26%; and * Others, ~16%.

The vocabulary of the English language has been shaped by extensive borrowing throughout its history. English descends from Old English, a West Germanic language, but much of its vocabulary consists of words borrowed from other languages.

A survey of 75,150 words in the third edition of the Shorter Oxford Dictionary found that words originating in the French and Latin languages together accounted for most of its entries. Other studies have produced different estimates, and the proportions vary depending on the corpus and the frequency of the words examined. The most common English words remain predominantly of Old English (Germanic) origin.

English has borrowed words from many other languages, including Greek, Old Norse, Dutch, Spanish, Italian, German, Arabic, and numerous Indigenous and Asian languages.

== Loanwords ==
A computerized survey of 75,150 words in the third edition of the Shorter Oxford Dictionary, published by Finkenstaedt and Wolff in 1973 estimated the origin of English words to be as follows:

- French (including Old French: 11.66%; Anglo-French: 1.88%; and French: 14.77%): 28.30%;
- Latin (including modern scientific and technical Latin): 28.24%;
- Germanic languages (including Old English, Proto-Germanic and others: 20.13%; Old Norse: 1.83%; Middle English: 1.53%; Dutch: 1.07%; excluding Germanic words borrowed from a Romance language): 25%; (Note: I.e., excluded are words coming from the Germanic element in French, Latin or other Romance languages.)
- Greek: 5.32%;
- no etymology given: 4.04%;
- derived from proper names: 3.28%; and
- all other languages: less than 1%

A 1975 survey of 10,000 words taken from several thousand business letters by Joseph M. Williams suggested this set of statistics:

- French (langue d'oïl): 41%;
- "Native" English (derived from Old English): 33%;
- Latin: 15%;
- Old Norse: 5%;
- Dutch: 1%; and
- Other: 5%.

However, he found considerable discrepancy between the most common and least common words. The top thousand words were 83% of English origin, while the least common were only 25% of English origin. Due to the variability of vocabulary of individuals, dialects, and time periods, exact percentages cannot be taken at face value.

== Languages influencing the English language ==
Here is a list of the most common foreign language influences in English, where other languages have influenced or contributed words to English.

=== Celtic ===
Celtic contributions are almost absent, but do exist. One such is the word galore, which came about in the 17th century and stems from the Irish, "go leor," similarly applied as a postpositive adjective, but specifying sufficiency of something. There also are dialectal words, such as the Yan Tan Tethera system of counting sheep. Hypotheses have been made that English syntax was influenced by Celtic languages, with its system of continuous tenses being a calque of similar Celtic phrasal structures. This is controversial, as the system has clear native English and other Germanic developments.

=== French ===
The French contributed legal, military, technological, and political terminology. French was the prestige language during the Norman occupation of the British Isles, causing many French words to enter English vocabulary. Their language also contributed common words, such as how food was prepared: boil, broil, fry, roast, and stew, as well as words related to the nobility: prince, duke, marquess, viscount, baron, and their feminine equivalents. Nearly 30 percent of English words (in an 80,000-word dictionary) are of French origin.

=== Latin ===
Most words in English that are derived from Latin are scientific and technical words, medical terminology, academic terminology, and legal terminology.

=== Greek ===
English words derived from Greek include scientific and medical terminology (for instance -phobias and -ologies), Christian theological terminology.

=== Norman ===
Castle, cauldron, kennel, catch, cater are among Norman words introduced into English. The Norman language also introduced (or reinforced) words of Norse origin such as mug.

=== Dutch ===
There are many ways through which Dutch words have entered the English language: via trade and navigation, such as skipper (from schipper), freebooter (from vrijbuiter), keelhauling (from kielhalen); via painting, such as landscape (from landschap), easel (from ezel), still life (from stilleven); warfare, such as forlorn hope (from verloren hoop), beleaguer (from beleger), to bicker (from bicken); via civil engineering, such as dam, polder, dune (from duin); via the New Netherland settlements in North America, such as cookie (from koekie), boss from baas, Santa Claus (from Sinterklaas); via Dutch/Afrikaans speakers with English speakers in South Africa, such as wildebeest, apartheid, boer, trek; via French words of Dutch/Flemish origin that have subsequently been adopted into English, such as boulevard (from bolwerk), mannequin (from manneken), buoy (from boei).

=== Indigenous languages of the Western Hemisphere ===
Algonquian: moose, raccoon, husky, chipmunk, pecan, squash, hominy, toboggan, tomahawk, monadnock, mohawk

Athabaskan: hogan

Cariban: cannibal, hurricane, manatee

Mescalero: apache

Nahuatl: tomato, coyote, chocolate, avocado, chili

Quechua: jerky, potato

Salishan: coho, sockeye, sasquatch, geoduck

Taíno: tobacco

Tupi-Guarani: acai, cougar, ipecac, jaguar, maraca, piranha, toucan

=== Spanish ===
Words from Iberian Romance languages (aficionado, albino, alligator, cargo, cigar, embargo, guitar, jade, mesa, paella, platinum, plaza, renegade, rodeo, salsa, savvy, sierra, siesta, tilde, tornado, vanilla etc.). Words relating to warfare and tactics, for instance flotilla, and guerrilla; or related to science and culture.

=== Italian ===
There are many Italian words used in the English language relating to music such as piano, fortissimo, and legato, and Italian culture and politics, such as piazza, pizza, gondola, balcony, fascism. The English word umbrella comes from Italian ombrello.

=== Turkic Languages ===
English contains many Turkish loanwords, which are still part of the modern vernacular, including bosh, Balkan, bugger, doodle, Hungary, lackey, mammoth, quiver, yogurt, and yataghan.

=== South Asian languages ===
English contains words relating to culture originating from the colonial era in India, e.g., atoll, avatar, bandana, bangles, buddy, bungalow, calico, candy, cashmere, chit, cot, curry, cushy, dinghy, guru, juggernaut, jungle, karma, khaki, lacquer, lilac, loot, mandarin, mantra, polo, pyjamas, shampoo, thug, tiffin, and veranda.

=== German ===
English is a Germanic language. As a result, many words are distantly related to German. Most German words relating to World War I and World War II found their way into the English language, words such as Blitzkrieg, Anschluss, Führer, and Lebensraum; food terms, such as bratwurst, hamburger and frankfurter; words related to psychology and philosophy, such as gestalt, Übermensch, zeitgeist, and realpolitik. From German origin are also: wanderlust, schadenfreude, kaputt, kindergarten, autobahn, rucksack.

=== Old Norse ===
Words of Old Norse origin have entered English primarily from the contact between Old Norse and Old English during colonisation of eastern and northern England between the mid 9th to the 11th centuries (see also Danelaw). Many of these words are part of English core vocabulary, such as they, egg, sky or knife.

=== Hebrew and Yiddish ===
Words used in religious contexts, like Sabbath, kosher, hallelujah, amen, and jubilee or words that have become slang like schmuck, shmooze, nosh, oy vey, and schmutz.

=== Frankish ===
Words such as warden and guardian are hypothesized to come from a proto-Romance loan from Frankish *wardōn 'to direct one's gaze'.

=== Arabic ===
Trade items such as borax, coffee, cotton, henna, mohair, muslin, saffron, Sofa; scientific vocabulary borrowed into Latin in the 12th and 13th centuries (alcohol, alkali, algebra, azimuth, zenith, cipher, nadir); plants or plant products originating in tropical Asia and introduced to medieval Europe through Arabic intermediation (camphor, jasmine, lacquer, lemon, orange, sugar); Middle Eastern and Maghrebi cuisine words (couscous, falafel, hummus, kebab, tahini).

== Counting ==
Cardinal numbering in English follows two models, Germanic and Italic. The basic numbers are zero through ten. The numbers eleven through nineteen follow native Germanic style, as do twenty, thirty, forty, fifty, sixty, seventy, eighty, and ninety.

Standard English, especially in very conservative formal contexts, continued to use native Germanic style as late as World War I for intermediate numbers greater than 20, viz., "one-and-twenty," "five-and-thirty," "seven-and-ninety," and so on. But with the advent of the Industrial Revolution, the Latin tradition of counting as "twenty-one," "thirty-five," "ninety-seven," etc., which is easier to say and was already common in non-standard regional dialects, gradually replaced the traditional Germanic style to become the dominant style by the end of nineteenth century.

== Opposition ==
Linguistic purism in the English language is the belief that words of native origin should be used instead of foreign-derived ones (which are mainly Latin and Greek). In its mild form, it merely means using existing native words instead of foreign-derived ones. It also applies to the African American Vernacular English (AAVE), frequently marginalized by being labeled as "ungrammatical," "incorrect," or an "uneducated" version of English, rather than a legitimate dialect with its own consistent grammar.

This dates at least to the inkhorn term debate of the 16th and 17th century, where some authors rejected the foreign influence, and has continued to this day, being most prominent in Plain English advocacy to avoid foreign terms if a simple native alternative exists.

== See also ==
- Influence of French on English
- Linguistic purism in English
- Cultural globalization
- Internet culture
- Neologism
- Philosophy of language
