= List of British French people =

This is a list of famous French people of British descent.

- Laura Cox
- Lou Doillon
- Henry Farman
- Charlotte Gainsbourg
- Antoine Hamilton
- Rebecca Hampton
- Emma Mackey
- Jeanne Moreau
- David Olivier
- George Onslow
- Andrew Michael Ramsay
- Erik Satie
- Samia Smith
- Charles Waddington (philosopher)
- Richard Waddington
- Jemima West
- William Henry Waddington
- Kenneth White (poet)
- Charles Frederick Worth

== See also ==
- British migration to France
- France – United Kingdom relations
