= Guadeloupe Passage =

Strait in the Caribbean

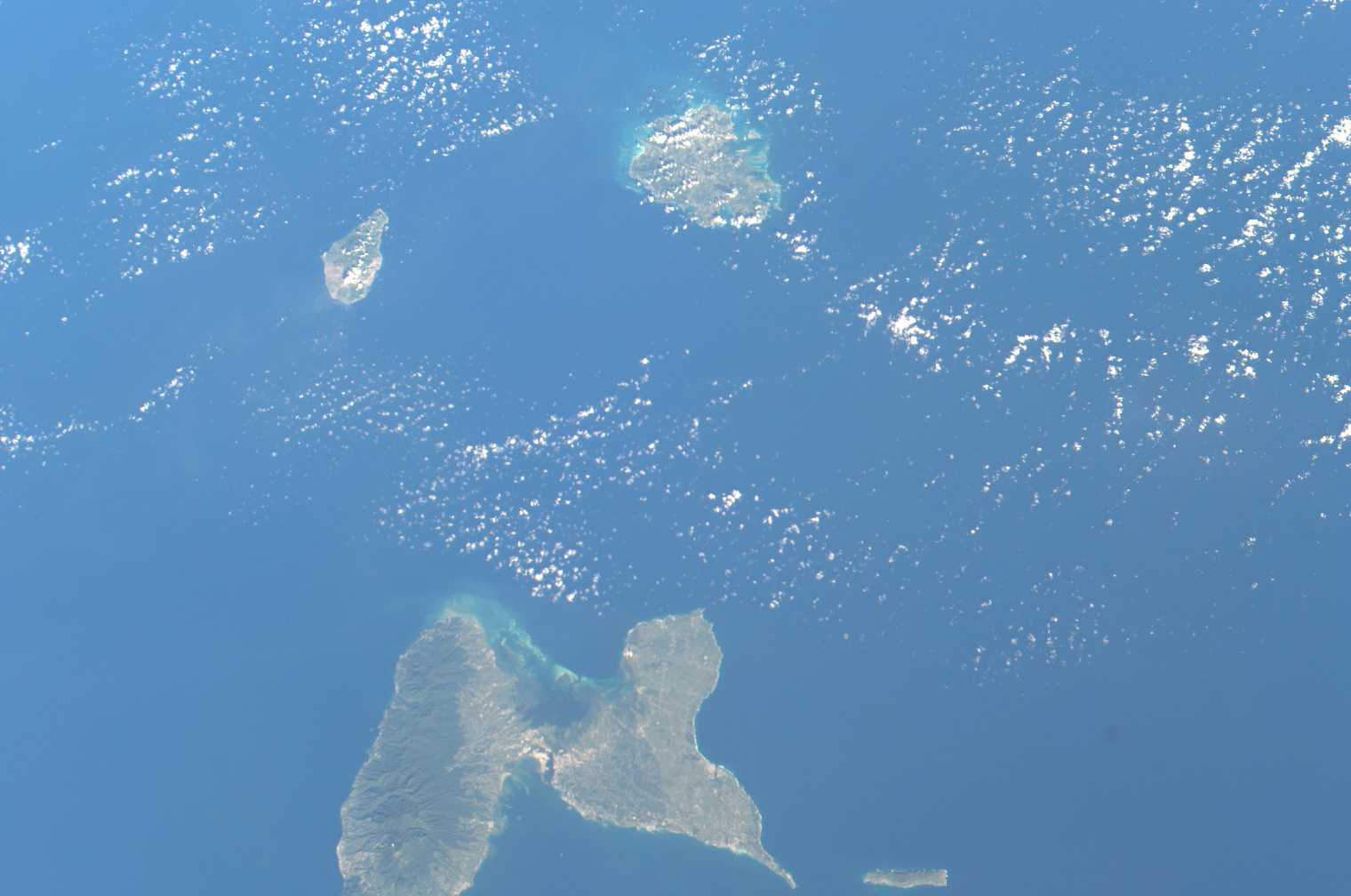
- Guadeloupe Passage as seen on November 20, 2005

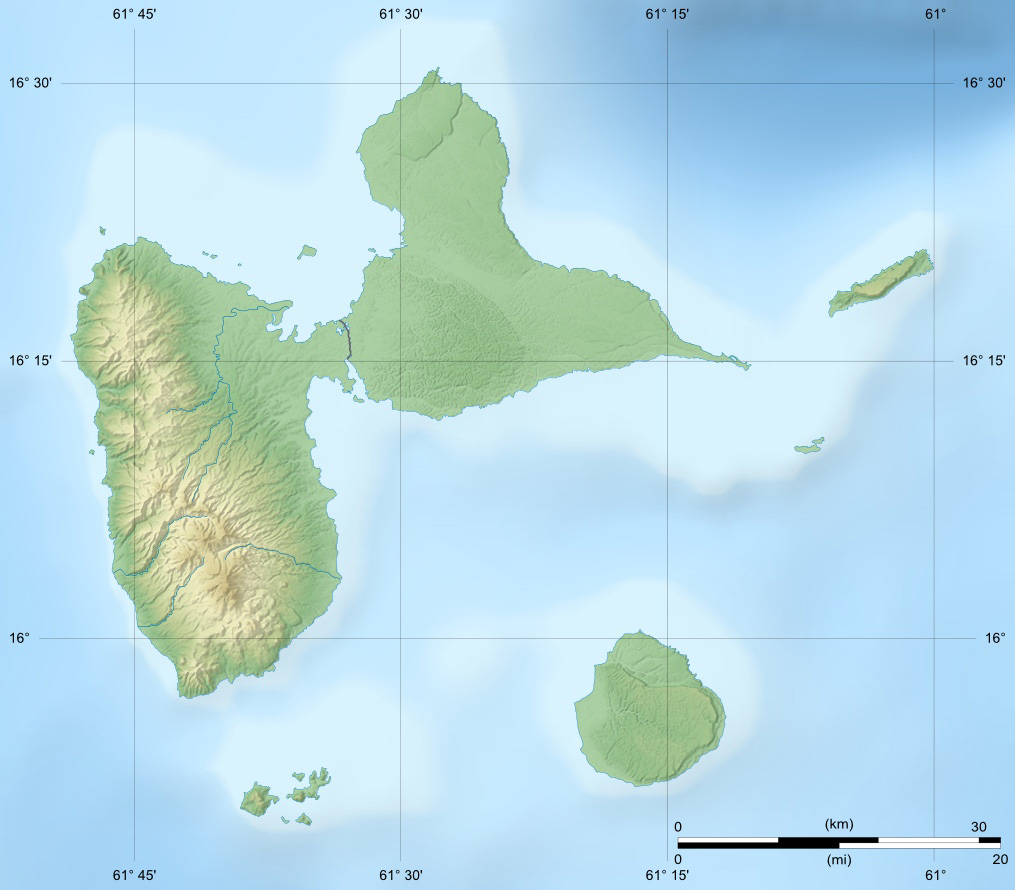
- Location within Guadeloupe Location within Lesser Antilles Location within the Caribbean
- Coordinates: 16°34′00″N 61°43′00″W
- Basin countries: Guadeloupe; Montserrat; Antigua and Barbuda

The Guadeloupe Passage is a strait in the Caribbean. It separates Guadeloupe from Montserrat and from Antigua and Barbuda.

== See also ==
- 1996 France–United Kingdom Maritime Delimitation Agreements
- Anguilla Channel
