= Nigel Broomfield =

British diplomat

Sir Nigel Broomfield KCMG

British Ambassador to Germany
- In office 1993–1997
- Monarch: Elizabeth II
- President: Richard von Weizsäcker; Roman Herzog
- Prime Minister: John Major
- Chancellor: Helmut Kohl
- Preceded by: Sir Christopher Mallaby
- Succeeded by: Christopher Meyer

Personal details
- Born: 19 March 1937 Nowshera, North West Frontier Province, British India (now Khyber Pakhtunkhwa, Pakistan)
- Died: 29 October 2018 (aged 81)
- Sports career
- Sport: squash
Medal record
Men's squash
Representing England
British Amateur Championships
Gold medal – first place	1957/1958	singles
Gold medal – first place	1958/1959	singles

Sir Nigel Hugh Robert Allen Broomfield KCMG (19 March 1937 – 29 October 2018) was a British diplomat and champion squash player.

== Career ==
Broomfield was born in Nowshera, North West Frontier Province and educated at Haileybury College and Trinity College, Cambridge. He joined the British Army and was commissioned in the 17th/21st Lancers in 1959, retiring with the rank of Major in 1968.

He joined the Foreign and Commonwealth Office (FCO) in 1969 and served in the British embassies in Bonn and Moscow, and with the British Military Government in Berlin, as well as senior posts at the FCO. He was Deputy High Commissioner, New Delhi, 1985–88; Ambassador to the German Democratic Republic 1988–90; Deputy Under Secretary of State (Defence) at the FCO 1990–92; and Ambassador to Germany 1993–97.

Broomfield was appointed CMG in 1986, and knighted as KCMG in 1993.

After retiring from the Diplomatic Service, Sir Nigel was director of the Ditchley Foundation 1999–2004. He took part in the Atlantic Storm exercise in 2005.

He was a non-executive director of TI Group 1998–2000 and of Smiths Group 2000–2007. He was also chairman of Leonard Cheshire Disability 2004-2009. He was honorary President of the German-British Chamber of Commerce. He was the founding non-executive chairman of Cambridge Quantum Computing.

He died of cancer on 29 October 2018 at the age of 81.

== Squash ==
Broomfield was a notable squash player and won the British Amateur Squash Championships during the 1957/58 and the 1958/59 seasons, defeating Egyptian Ibrahim Amin in both finals.

Diplomatic posts
Preceded by Sir Christopher Mallaby	British Ambassador to Germany; 1993–1997	Succeeded by Christopher Meyer
