= Christopher Mallaby =

British diplomat (1936–2022)

Sir Christopher Mallaby GCMG GCVO
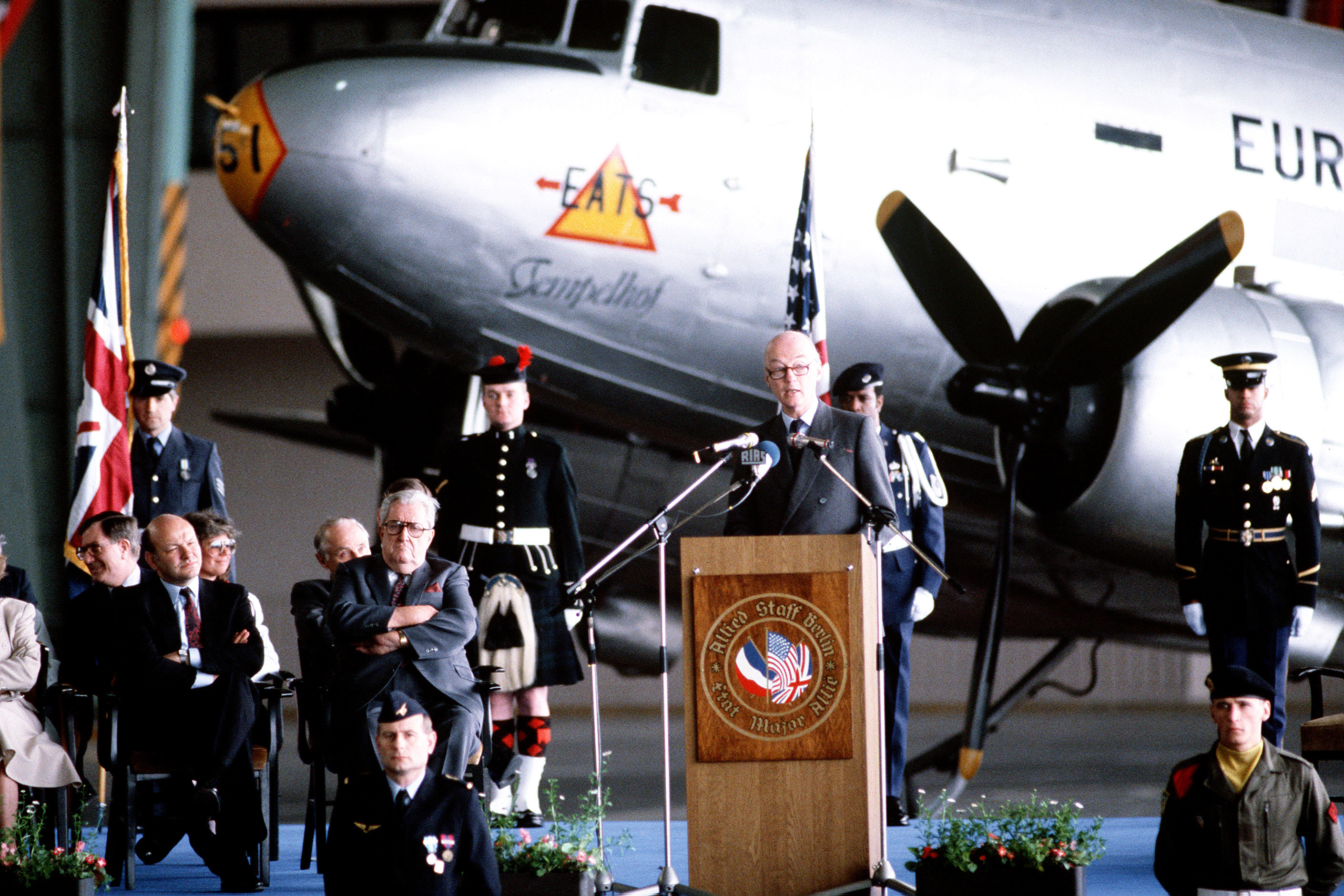
- Mallaby commemorating the 40th anniversary of the Berlin airlift

British Ambassador to France
- In office 1993–1996
- Monarch: Elizabeth II
- Prime Minister: John Major
- Preceded by: Sir Ewen Fergusson
- Succeeded by: Sir Michael Jay

British Ambassador to Germany (West Germany, 1988–1990)
- In office 1988–1993
- Monarch: Elizabeth II
- President: Richard von Weizsäcker
- Prime Minister: Margaret Thatcher; John Major
- Chancellor: Helmut Kohl
- Preceded by: Sir Julian Bullard
- Succeeded by: Sir Nigel Broomfield

Personal details
- Born: 7 July 1936 Camberley, Surrey, England
- Died: 28 February 2022 (aged 85) Westminster, London, England
- Spouse: Pascale Thierry-Mieg (m. 1962; died 2020)
- Children: 4, including Sebastian
- Parent: Aubertin Walter Sothern Mallaby (father)
- Education: Eton College
- Alma mater: King's College, Cambridge; Harvard Business School

Sir Christopher Leslie George Mallaby GCMG GCVO (7 July 1936 – 28 February 2022) was a British diplomat.

== Early life and career ==
Christopher Leslie George Mallaby was born in Camberley, Surrey, England on 7 July 1936. The son of Brigadier A. W. S. Mallaby CIE OBE and Margaret Catherine Mallaby (née Jones), he was educated at Eton College and studied Modern Languages and History at King's College, Cambridge. In 1971 he studied at Harvard Business School. After leaving university he entered Her Majesty's Diplomatic Service in 1959.

Mallaby was British Ambassador to West Germany 1988-1992, British Ambassador to France 1993-1996 and Managing Director of UBS Investment Bank.

He was chairman of Somerset House Trust from 2002–2006, and trustee of the Tate Gallery Group 1996-2002. He was also as of 2011 a trustee director and deputy-chairman of Reuters, and since 2001 has been the chairman of EORTC.

Mallaby was appointed Companion of the Order of St Michael and St George (CMG) in the 1982 Birthday Honours, promoted to Knight Commander of the Order (KCMG) in the 1988 New Year Honours, and to Knight Grand Cross of the Order (GCMG) in the 1996 Birthday Honours. He was also appointed a Knight Grand Cross of the Royal Victorian Order in 1992. He was appointed Chancellor of the Order of St Michael and St George in 2005.

In an interview in 2009, when asked how bad the relationship between the prime minister of the United Kingdom Margaret Thatcher and Chancellor of Germany Helmut Kohl was, Mallaby replied, "Very bad. It was about personal chemistry. They didn't naturally enjoy each other's company. Mrs Thatcher had easier relationships with Reagan or Gorbachev."

He initiated the Entente Cordiale Scholarship scheme, a prestigious Franco-British scholarship programme.

== Personal life and death ==
In 1961 Mallaby married Pascale Thierry-Mieg, and they had a son, the journalist and author Sebastian Mallaby, and three daughters. Lady Mallaby died on 11 February 2020. Christopher Mallaby died at his home in Westminster, London, on 28 February 2022, aged 85.

Diplomatic posts
Preceded by Sir Julian Bullard	British Ambassador to West Germany; 1988–1990	Germany reunifies
Recreated Germany reunified	British Ambassador to Germany; 1990–1993	Succeeded by Sir Nigel Broomfield
Preceded by Sir Ewen Fergusson	British Ambassador to France; 1993–1996	Succeeded by Sir Michael Jay
