= Anglo-French alliance =

Anglo-French alliance may refer to:

- Treaty of Dunkirk (1947), an alliance in the aftermath of World War II.
- Treaty of Paris (1657), an alliance against Spain
- Anglo-French Alliance (1716–31), another alliance against Spain
- Anglo-French blockade of the Río de la Plata (1845–1850)
- Anglo-French joint invasion of Qing Dynasty during the Second Opium War (1856–1860)
- Entente Cordiale (1904), which prepared fighting together in both World Wars
