= 1983 France–United Kingdom Maritime Boundary Convention =

1983 treaty between France and the United Kingdom

1983 France – United Kingdom Maritime Boundary Convention
Convention on Maritime Boundaries between the Government of the French Republic and the Government of the United Kingdom of Great Britain and Northern Ireland
- Type: Boundary delimitation
- Signed: 25 October 1983
- Location: Paris, France
- Effective: 12 April 1984
- Parties: France; United Kingdom
- Depositary: United Nations Secretariat
- Languages: English; French

The 1983 France – United Kingdom Maritime Boundary Convention is a 1983 treaty between France and the United Kingdom which establishes the maritime boundary between French Polynesia and the British territory of the Pitcairn Islands.

The treaty was signed in Paris on 25 October 1983. The text of the treaty sets out a boundary that is an equidistant line between the nearest islands of the two territories. The boundary is roughly north–south and consists of five straight-line maritime segments defined by six individual coordinate points.

The convention came into force on 12 April 1984, after both states had ratified it. In 1993, after the United Kingdom declared an Exclusive Economic Zone (EEZ) around the Pitcairn Islands, the two states agreed that the boundary set out in the 1983 treaty should also be the boundary between the French and British EEZs in the South Pacific.

The full name of the treaty is Convention on Maritime Boundaries between the Government of the French Republic and the Government of the United Kingdom of Great Britain and Northern Ireland.

== See also ==
- 1996 France–United Kingdom Maritime Delimitation Agreements
