= Rendezvous Bay Pond =

Wetland in Anguilla

Coordinates: 18°10′31″N 63°06′20″W

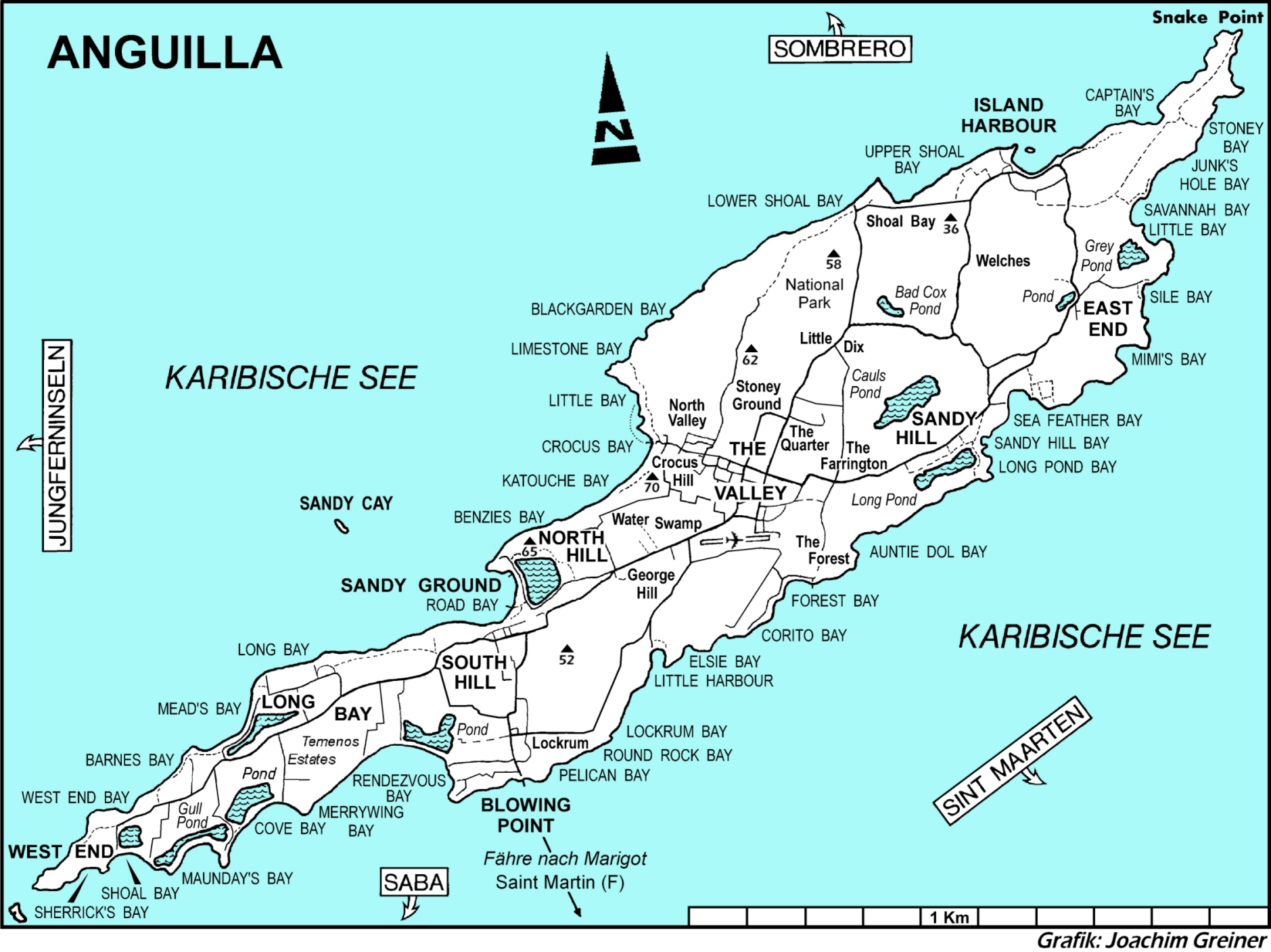
Map of Anguilla showing the pond next to Rendezvous Bay near the south-western end of the island

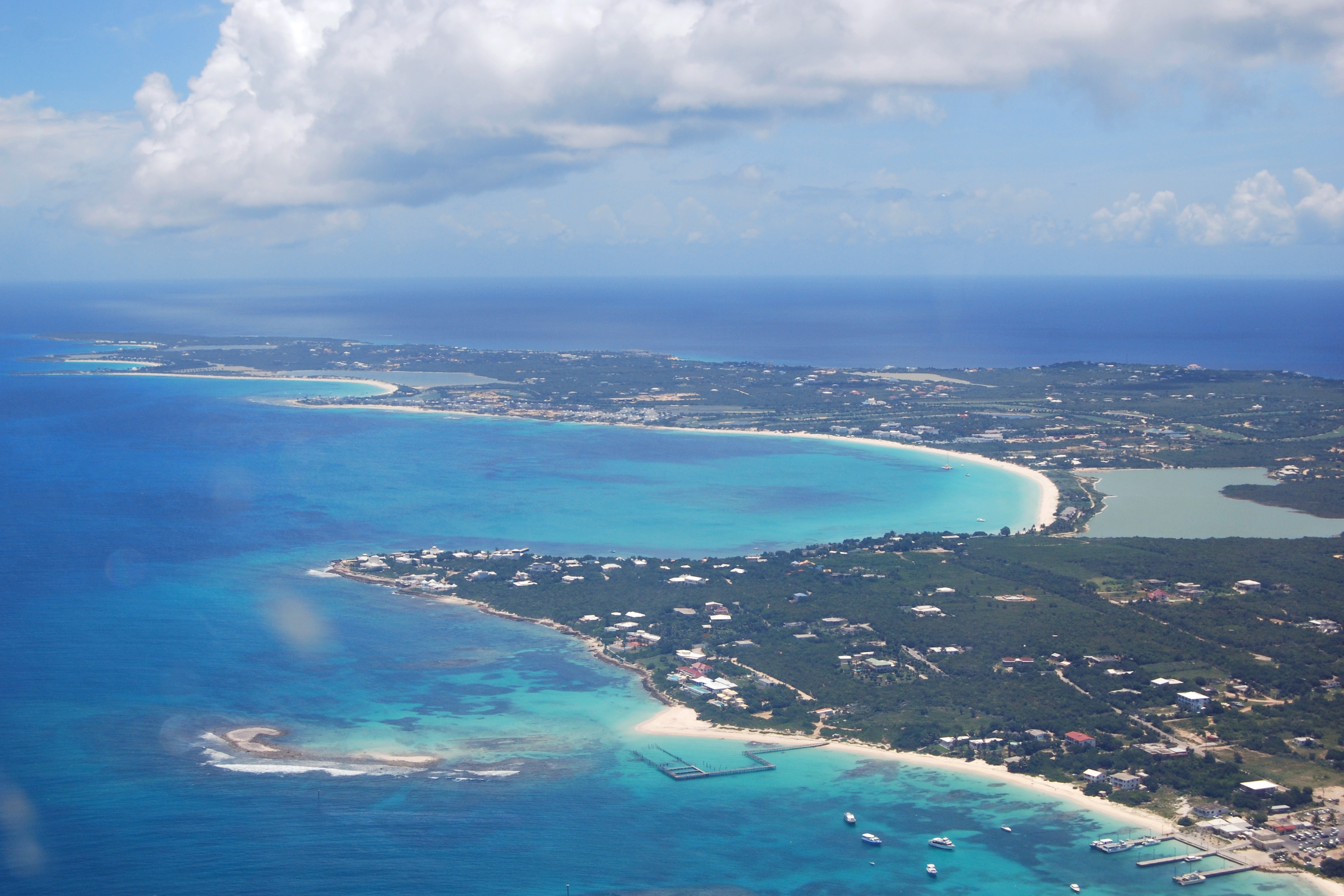
Aerial view from the north-east of the south-western end of Anguilla, with Rendezvous Bay occupying the middle ground and Rendezvous Bay Pond to its immediate right, separated only by a thin strip of land

Rendezvous Bay Pond, also known as Rendezvous Bay Salt Pond, is a wetland in Anguilla, a British Overseas Territory in the Caribbean Sea. It is one of the territory's Important Bird Areas (IBAs).

== Description ==
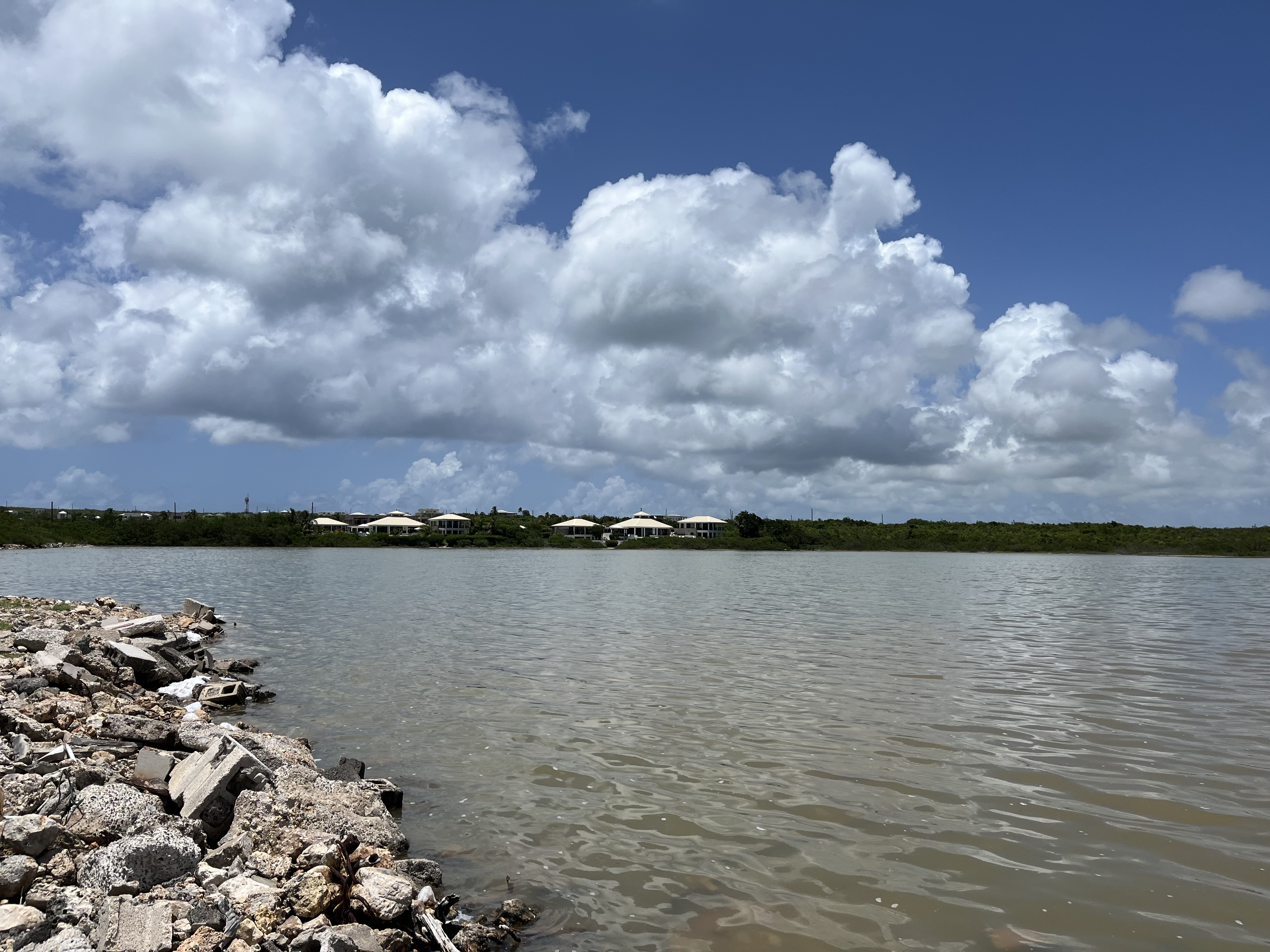
Rendezvous Bay Salt Pond

The pond is a shallow, 24 ha brackish lagoon near the south-western end of the main island. The substrate is marl on the northern side and sand on the southern. It receives fresh water from rainfall, runoff and a few springs. The pond also receives salt water seepage from the bay through the strip of beach that divides them. It was historically used for salt production. Vegetation around the pond is sparse, except for stands of buttonwood mangroves at its western end. Land at the eastern end is mainly used for livestock grazing.

=== Birds ===
The IBA was identified as such by BirdLife International because it supports a small breeding colony of least terns as well as populations of common terns and brown pelicans.
