= 1996 France–United Kingdom Maritime Delimitation Agreements =

1996 France – United Kingdom Maritime Delimitation Agreements
- Type: Boundary delimitation
- Signed: 27 June 1996
- Location: London, United Kingdom
- Effective: 30 January 1997
- Parties: France; United Kingdom
- Depositary: United Nations Secretariat
- Languages: English; French

The 1996 France – United Kingdom Maritime Delimitation Agreements are two treaties between France and the United Kingdom which establish a number of maritime boundary between French territories and British territories in the Caribbean Sea.

Both treaties were signed in London on 27 June 1996. The two treaties entered into force on 30 January 1997 after they had been ratified by both states.

== First treaty ==
The first treaty delimits the boundary in the Anguilla Channel between the British territory of Anguilla and the French territories of Saint Martin and Saint Barthélemy. The boundary is a simplified equidistant maritime line that runs in roughly an east–west direction. It consists of seven straight-line segments defined by eight individual coordinate points. The western end of the border forms a tripoint with the Netherlands Antilles and the easternmost end of the border forms the tripoint with Antigua and Barbuda. The full name of the treaty is Agreement on maritime delimitation between the Government of the French Republic and the Government of the United Kingdom of Great Britain and Northern Ireland concerning Saint Martin and Saint Barthélemy, on one hand, and Anguilla on the other.

When the treaty was signed, Saint Martin and Saint Barthélemy were both part of the Guadeloupe overseas department of France. In 2007, Saint Martin and Saint Barthélemy became two separate overseas collectivities of France. As a result, the first treaty now defines only the Anguilla – Saint Martin maritime boundary. There is no maritime boundary between Anguilla and the separate collectivity of Saint Barthélemy.

== Second treaty ==
The second treaty delimits the boundary between the British territory of Montserrat and the French territory of Guadeloupe. The boundary is a simplified equidistant line that runs through the Guadeloupe Passage in roughly an east–west direction. It consists of four straight-line segments defined by five individual coordinate points. The western end of the border forms the tripoint with Venezuela and the easternmost end of the border forms a tripoint with Antigua and Barbuda. The full name of the treaty is Agreement on maritime delimitation between the Government of the French Republic and the Government of the United Kingdom of Great Britain and Northern Ireland concerning Guadeloupe and Montserrat.

== See also ==
- 1983 France–United Kingdom Maritime Boundary Convention
