= Entente Cordiale Scholarships =

Franco-British scholarship scheme

The Entente Cordiale Scholarship scheme (Bourses Entente Cordiale) is a selective Franco-British scholarship scheme. It provides funding for British and French students to study for one academic year on the other side of the Channel. The scheme is administered by the French embassy in London for British students, and by the British Council France and the UK embassy in Paris for French students. Funding is provided by the private sector and foundations. The scheme aims to favour mutual understanding and to promote exchanges between the British and French leaders of tomorrow.

== History ==
The creation of the Entente Cordiale scholarships was announced on 30 October 1995 by British Prime Minister John Major and French President Jacques Chirac at an Anglo-French summit in London. They said: “Young people in our two countries represent our shared future. The more they learn about their near neighbour as they advance in their education, the more they can contribute to the enlightened partnership and growing opportunities, which we are now developing in an enlarged Europe.”

The programme was initiated by Sir Christopher Mallaby, British ambassador to France between 1993 and 1996. During his first months as ambassador in France, he decided he had to move quickly if he was to do anything “to try to reduce the ingrained suspicion that can arise between the British and the French.” The problem, he explained, “arises from past rivalry and current ignorance.” He therefore encouraged the Entente Cordiale scholarship scheme, which funds studies for postgraduate students across the Channel “at an age when impressions and friendships are forged for life.” Another strong support of the scheme was French writer and politician Maurice Druon, who was appointed an Honorary Knight Commander of the Order of the British Empire for his work in wartime London and for his broadcasts to occupied France from the BBC. Of the Entente Cordiale, he said in 2004 during the celebrations held for the centenary of the alliance: “Cordial understanding! What a classic piece of British understatement. It is not a cordial understanding - it is an alliance. And it is one that saved Europe twice!”

The first Entente Cordiale scholars studied during the academic year 1995-1996.

The Entente Cordiale Scholarships scheme is administered by two trusts, one in the United Kingdom, the other in France. These trusts are independent, but work in close cooperation.

== Goal ==
The stated goal of the Entente Cordiale Scholarship scheme was to “promote contacts and increase exchanges between tomorrow’s decision-makers in the United Kingdom and France” and “to build an influential and widespread network of alumni and sponsors”.

Sir Christophe Mallaby, founder of the scheme, hoped it would increase understanding between the two countries. “Some of the scholars will go on to become influential men and women. (…) I hope that as a consequence, there will be among British and French decision-makers more and more people with deep knowledge of the other country. Knowledge overcomes prejudice, and should lead to more temperate opinions at high levels of responsibility on either side of the Channel.”

== Organisation and selection criteria ==
This scheme is Franco-British, and funds postgraduate students for one academic year in France for British scholars and in the United Kingdom for French scholars. On the British side, the scholarships are managed by the French embassy in London. On the French side, the scholarships are managed by the British Council France and the British embassy in Paris.

Funding is provided by the private sector, while administrative costs are borne by the British and French governments.

The selection of the scholars is based not only on their academic success, but also on their professional ambitions and their desire to become influential in their domains of expertise. Also taken into account is their ability to invest themselves and develop links between the United Kingdom and France in their field of activity. The scholarships are awarded in a broad range of academic subjects, ensuring a diversity of profiles and backgrounds among scholars.

== Past and current sponsors ==
Companies currently funding the Entente Cordiale Scholarships scheme are the following: Rolls-Royce, Rothschild & Co, Areva, Schlumberger, Herbert Smith.

In the past, the following companies have supported the programme: Académie Française, Alstom, Arjowiggins, Axa, British Airways, Capgemini, Charles Schiaffino, European Investment Bank, Groupe Saint Louis, GSK, Institute of Applied Languages, JCB, Lagardère, Matra BAe Dynamics, Louis Dreyfus & Cie SA, L'Oréal, Le Progrès, Messier Dowty International, Pernod Ricard, Redlands Granulates, Rothschild & Cie, Rover France, Saint Gobain, Société des Bourses Françaises, H.H. Prince Karim Aga Khan, CCF, Fondation Singer-Polignac, Groupe RMC, Groupe Darty, Institut de France, Linklaters and Alliance, Turbomeca, Lafarge, Corus, Financial Times, Madame Alice Goldet, Roy Jenkins Memorial Trust, Unilever, Arcadian International, BP Amoco Foundation, British Midland, BT, CGNU, The Dulverton Trust, EDF Energy, Hillsdown Holdings plc, Kingfisher, NatWest, Paribas, Paul Minet, The Reuters Foundation, The Rhodes Trust, The Savoy Educational Trust, Securicor, Sir Patrick Sheehy, Steelite International, UBS, Xerox EDF, Vodafone Foundation UK, Dassault Systèmes, Boucheron.

Additionally, in 2011 a scholarship was funded entirely by donations from alumni.

== The Entente Cordiale Herbert-Smith Scholarship ==
The Entente Cordiale Herbert Smith Freehills Scholarship, first awarded in June 2012, funds a French law student to study for an LL.M. in a British university. Apart from the field of study, the criteria of selection remain similar. When back in France, the scholar is offered a placement with the law firm Herbert Smith Freehills.

== Sources ==
- Cross Current Channels: 100 Years of the Entente Cordiale Edited by Richard J. Mayne, Douglas Johnson and Robert Tombs, 2004
- Are International Exchange and Mobility Programmes Effective Tools of Symmetric Public Diplomacy ? Iain Wilson, Aberystwyth University, 2010
- Crossing the Channel, Promoting academic mobility within Europe
- The Entente Cordiale Scholarships on the website of the French embassy in the UK
- The Entente Cordiale Scholarships on the website of the UK embassy in France
- The Entente Cordiale Scholarships on the website of the British Council France
- Website of the Entente Cordiale alumni
- Regards Voices-Around the world in seven Entente Cordiale scholars'stories
