= Freebooter =

Freebooter may refer to:

- Marine freebooters, or pirates
- Filibuster (military), an individual who engages in unauthorized warfare against foreign countries
- Rapparee, the Irish usage
- Meadowbrook Freebooters, American polo team
- Freebooter (comics), a fictional character
- Freebooters F.C., a former Irish football team
- A form of copyright infringement in which works originally posted to social media are copied and re-uploaded without permission or attribution.
