= Abrolhos =

Abrolhos or Abrolhos Islands may refer to two archipelagos:

- Abrolhos Archipelago, off the north-east coast of Brazil
  - Abrolhos Marine National Park, at the Atlantic Ocean, off the East coast of Brazil
- Houtman Abrolhos, a chain of islands in the Indian Ocean off the West coast of Australia
