= Conservation International Brazil =

Country programme of Conservation International in Brazil

- Conservação Internacional do Brasil
- Abbreviation: CI Brazil
- Formation: 1990
- Type: Country programme
- Headquarters: Rio de Janeiro, Brazil
- Region served: Brazil
- Fields: Biodiversity conservation; protected areas; sustainable landscapes; oceans; climate resilience
- Parent organization: Conservation International
- Website: brasil.conservation.org

Conservation International Brazil (CI Brazil; Portuguese: Conservação Internacional do Brasil) is the Brazil country programme of Conservation International.

CI Brazil has worked in terrestrial and marine landscapes across several Brazilian biomes—including the Amazon rainforest, the Cerrado and the Atlantic Forest—and in coastal and marine areas such as the Abrolhos region.

Programme work includes participation in the Global Environment Facility (GEF)-financed Amazon Sustainable Landscapes Project (Paisagens Sustentáveis da Amazônia), supported by the World Bank, and selection in 2024 as a partner manager in the Amazon Fund initiative Restaura Amazônia for restoration actions in Pará and Maranhão. Other projects have addressed deforestation pressures linked to soy expansion in the Cerrado/MATOPIBA region (named for the states of Maranhão, Tocantins, Piauí and Bahia) and initiatives to strengthen marine protected areas and sustainable tourism in the Abrolhos seascape. Work has also included long-term projects with Indigenous partners such as the Kayapó in south-eastern Amazonia.

== Overview ==
CI Brazil was established in 1990 and the programme maintains offices in Rio de Janeiro, Brasília and Santarém.

In 2017, CI Brazil signed a grant agreement (GEF grant TF0A6056) to implement parts of the Amazon Sustainable Landscapes Project (ASL).

The programme operates through the nonprofit association Associação Conservação Internacional do Brasil, headquartered in Rio de Janeiro.

Its project portfolio has included protected-area and integrated landscape management and restoration initiatives in the Brazilian Amazon, efforts linked to deforestation risks in soy supply chains in the Cerrado/MATOPIBA frontier, and marine protected-area governance and sustainable-tourism work in coastal areas such as the Abrolhos region.

== History ==
CI Brazil was established in 1990.

In 1992, CI started a conservation-and-development partnership with the Kayapó community of A’Ukre in south-eastern Amazonia that sought to reduce reliance on the sale of illegally logged mahogany and to protect an intact mahogany population on Kayapó lands. The partnership maintained an area of approximately 8,000 hectares (80 km^{2}) for research and protection of mahogany, and emphasised locally legitimate governance for managing common resources, tangible benefits for community members and long-term engagement.

Early Indigenous and community partnerships were later complemented by landscape-scale programmes and, in the 2020s, by participation in mechanisms that finance large-scale restoration and sustainable-landscape work.

In 2004, during debates over a proposed system of public-forest concessions for sustainable timber harvesting, CI Brazil supported regulation intended to curb illegal logging while arguing that concession design needed to address how local workforces would be included in concession projects.

From the late 2010s, CI Brazil was an executing partner for the Amazon Sustainable Landscapes Project (ASL), a programme supporting expansion and improved management of protected areas and promoting restoration and more sustainable land management in the Brazilian Amazon. In the Cerrado/MATOPIBA region, CI Brazil began implementing the project Taking Deforestation Out of the Soy Supply Chain in 2017, intended to reduce deforestation pressures associated with soy expansion and promote more sustainable production at a landscape scale.

In 2024, CI Brazil was selected as the partner manager for macrorregião 3 (Pará and Maranhão) within Restaura Amazônia.

== Programmes and operations ==
Selected programme locations in Brazil (1 Rio de Janeiro, 2 Brasília, 3 Santarém, 4 Abrolhos seascape, 5 MATOPIBA)

=== National ===
CI Brazil is headquartered in Rio de Janeiro and maintains an office in Brasília.

=== Brazilian Amazon ===
In the Brazilian Amazon, CI Brazil undertakes protected-area and sustainable-landscape work, including activities linked to restoration and more sustainable land use and projects with local communities and Indigenous partners.

For background on the region, see Amazon rainforest.

It has served as an executing partner for the Amazon Sustainable Landscapes Project (ASL), which focuses on expanding and strengthening protected areas and supporting restoration and sustainable land management in the Brazilian Amazon. Activities have included protected-area management and integrated landscape management across multiple states in the Brazilian Amazon, including Acre, Amazonas, Pará and Rondônia.

CI Brazil maintains an office in Santarém (Pará).

CI Brazil has implemented projects in Pará, including Tapajós Sustentável, an Amazon Fund-supported initiative in the Tapajós region linked to forest conservation and community-based sustainable activities.

In the Tapajós region, CI Brazil has collaborated with the Amazon Environmental Research Institute (IPAM; Portuguese: Instituto de Pesquisa Ambiental da Amazônia) and community organisations on restoration and agroforestry initiatives, including training and support for local value chains.

Indigenous-partnership work includes the 1992 conservation-and-development alliance with the Kayapó community of A’Ukre in south-eastern Amazonia and later projects supporting territorial monitoring and deterrence efforts on Kayapó lands.

In Restaura Amazônia, CI Brazil serves as partner manager for macrorregião 3 (Pará and Maranhão), responsible for managing calls for proposals and supporting monitoring and accountability processes.

=== Atlantic Forest ===
For background on the biome, see Atlantic Forest.

CI Brazil was listed as one of the supporting organisations for a project in Pernambuco aimed at supporting the creation of protected areas in the state's Atlantic Forest remnants.

=== Cerrado and MATOPIBA ===
In the Cerrado and the MATOPIBA agricultural frontier, CI Brazil has worked on initiatives intended to reduce deforestation pressures linked to soy expansion and promote more sustainable production at a landscape scale.

For background on the biome and the agricultural frontier, see Cerrado and MATOPIBA.

It served as an implementing partner for the project Taking Deforestation Out of the Soy Supply Chain, which supported multistakeholder coordination (including the Matopiba Coalition) and technical work related to the Cadastro Ambiental Rural (CAR) in Tocantins and Bahia.

=== Marine and coastal areas ===
In coastal and marine areas, CI Brazil has supported marine protected-area governance and sustainable tourism initiatives, including work in the Abrolhos seascape.

For background on a key focus area, see Abrolhos Marine National Park.

One example is a 2023–2025 initiative in the Abrolhos seascape aimed at strengthening marine protected areas and supporting sustainable tourism around Abrolhos Marine National Park and the Cassurubá Extractive Reserve. Outreach activities in the Abrolhos/Cassurubá region have included public events in Caravelas, Bahia, including the Festival da Diversidade: conecte-se à sua natureza programme linked to visits to Abrolhos and the Cassurubá Extractive Reserve. Scientific and technical work associated with CI Brazil has included studies of reef-monitoring methods in Bahia using video transects.

Programme landscapes of Conservation International Brazil
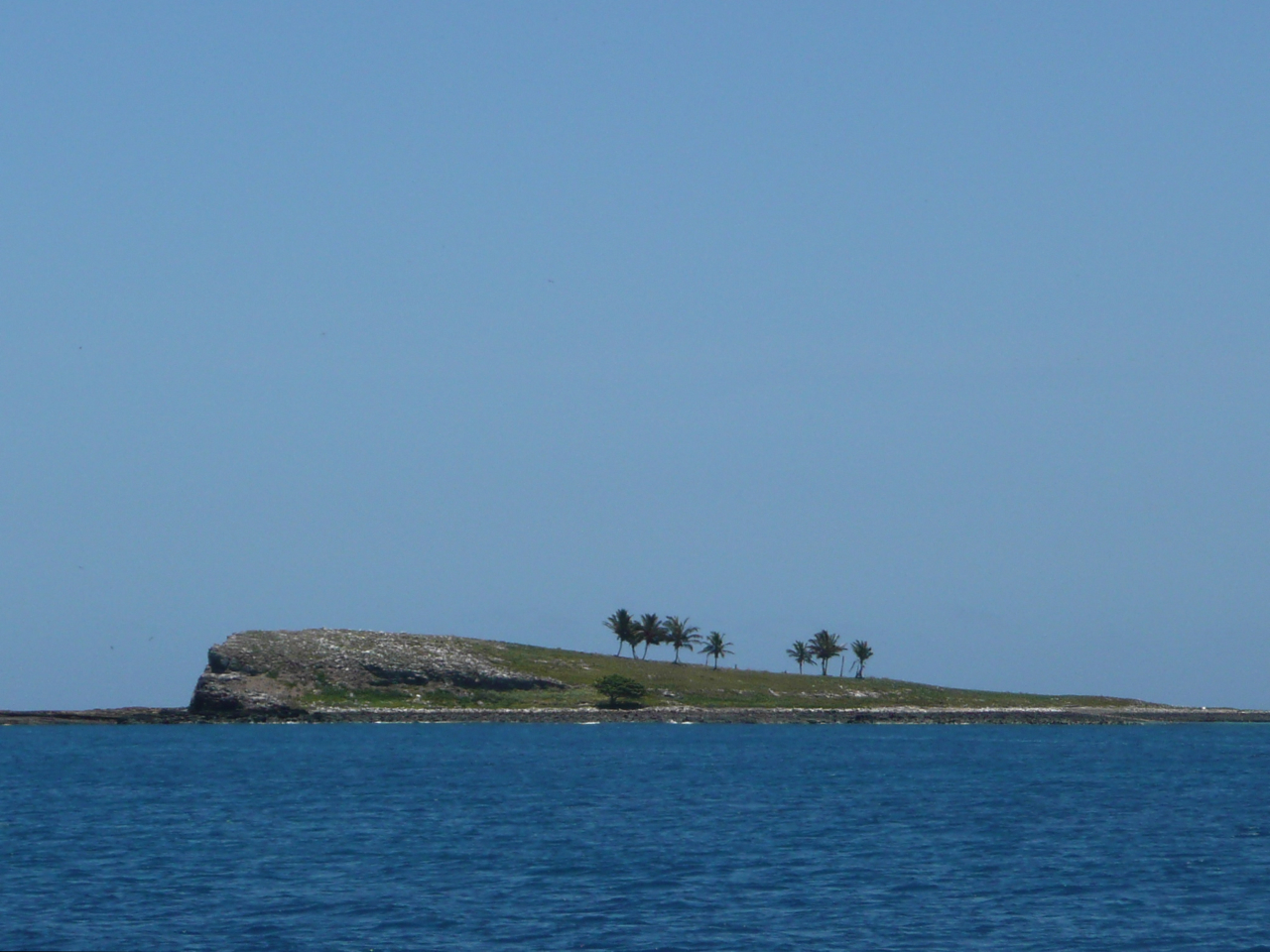
Abrolhos Marine National Park

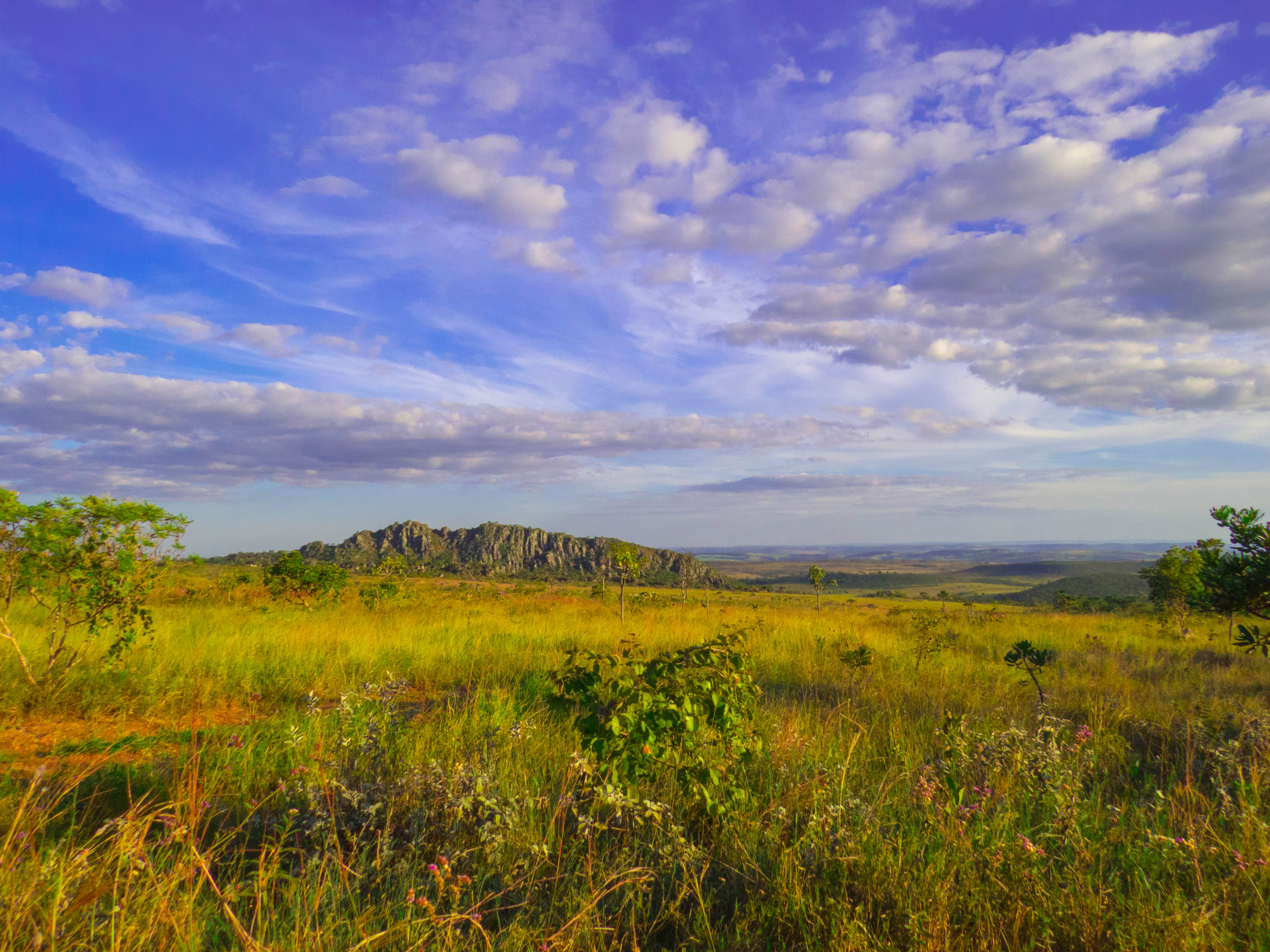
Cerrado

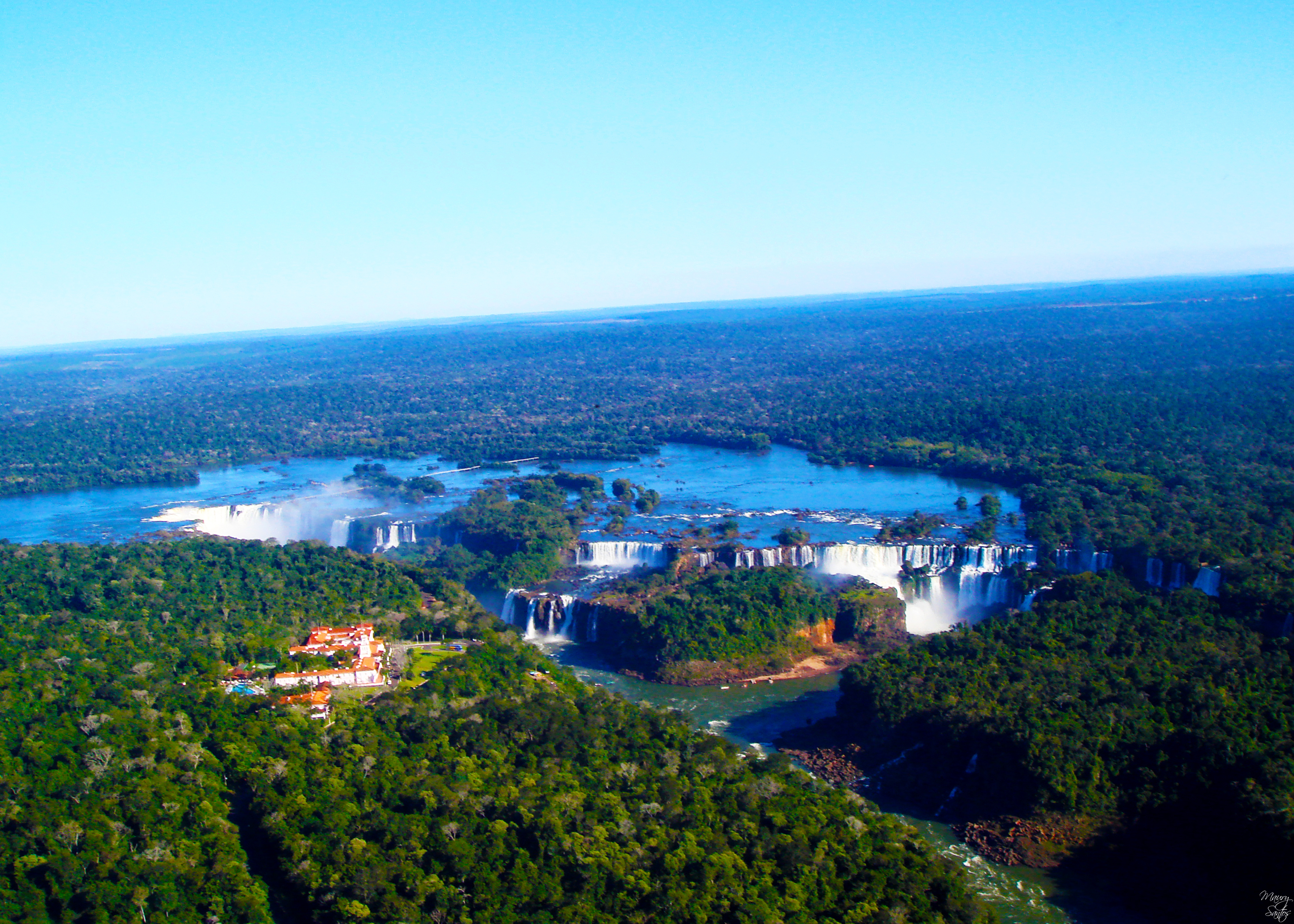
Atlantic Forests

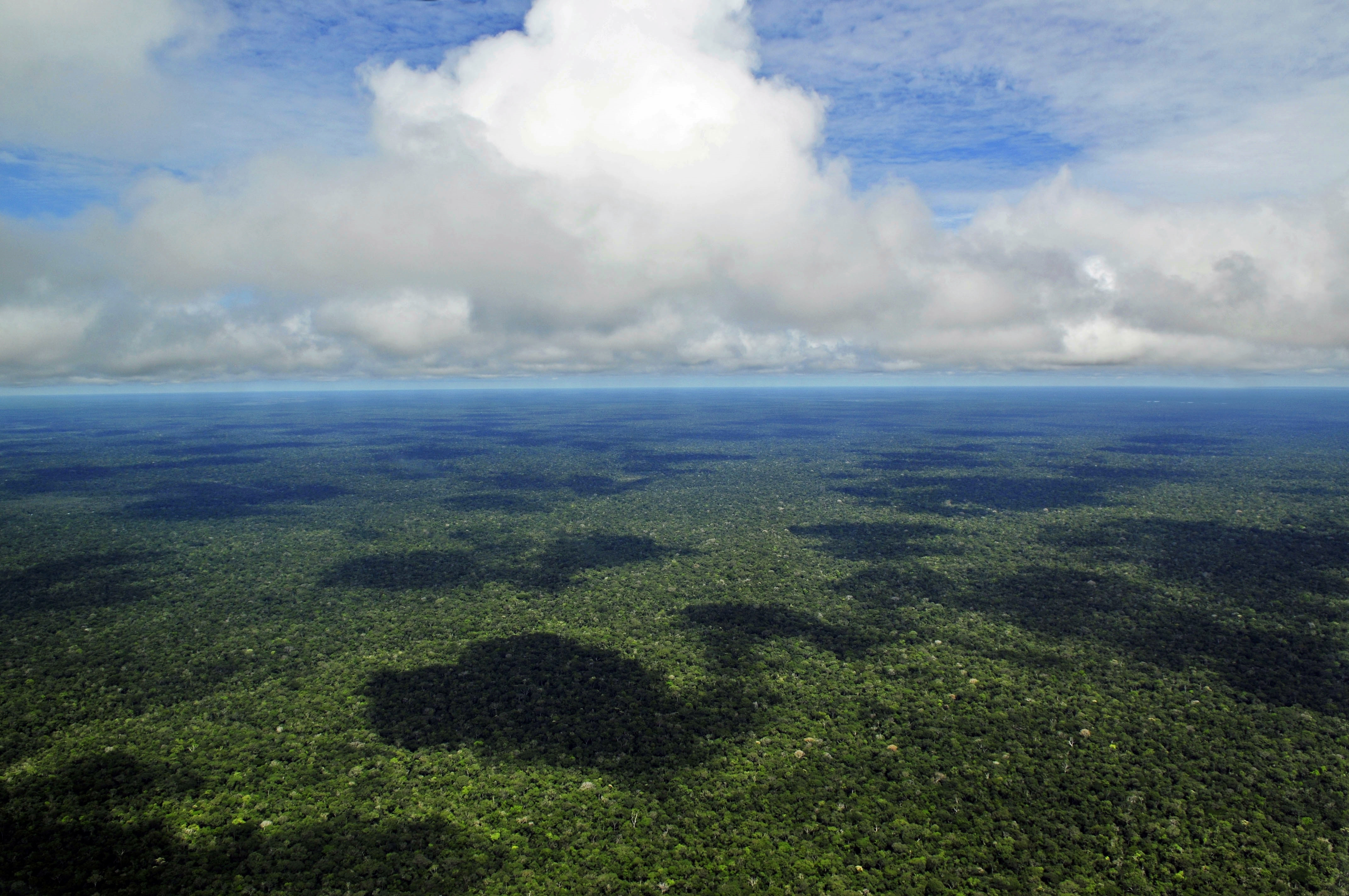
Amazon Rainforest

== Partnerships ==
CI Brazil's work involves partnerships with Brazilian public bodies, multilateral organisations and other civil-society organisations. The Comissão Nacional da Biodiversidade (CONABIO) is a consultative body linked to Brazil's Ministry of the Environment and Climate Change. In 2024, a ministerial ordinance appointing environmental non-governmental organisations to represent Brazil's biomes on CONABIO included Conservation International do Brasil as the organisation elected for the Amazon biome.

In the Amazon Sustainable Landscapes Project (Paisagens Sustentáveis da Amazônia), implementation has involved federal and state environmental bodies, with coordination by the Ministry of the Environment and Climate Change, programme implementation by the World Bank and financing through the Global Environment Facility, and execution by the Fundo Brasileiro para a Biodiversidade (FUNBIO) and CI Brazil in the first phase and by FUNBIO, CI Brazil and the Getulio Vargas Foundation (FGV) in the second phase.

Partnerships linked to the Amazon Fund have included CI Brazil's role as partner manager for Pará and Maranhão in Restaura Amazônia, supporting calls for proposals and monitoring arrangements under the initiative. In Pará, CI Brazil has also implemented Amazon Fund-supported initiatives such as Tapajós Sustentável, including activities carried out with local community organisations and collaboration with partners such as IPAM.

In the Cerrado/MATOPIBA, CI Brazil served as an implementing partner for a UNDP–Global Environment Facility project focused on deforestation pressures associated with soy expansion and linked technical work to environmental-registration processes under the Cadastro Ambiental Rural (CAR).

In the Abrolhos seascape, partnerships described in programme materials include work linked to protected areas and nature-based tourism, with a tourism-sector partner organisation participating in the 2023–2025 initiative.

Indigenous partnerships include CI Brazil's long-term work with Kayapó partners in south-eastern Amazonia beginning in the early 1990s. Amazon Fund resources have also been used to establish the Fundo Kayapó mechanism for projects in Kayapó Indigenous Lands, with FUNBIO acting as financial manager and CI Brazil described as participating in governance arrangements alongside Indigenous and public-sector actors. In 2025, Fundo Kayapó support included workshops for young people and women in preparation for COP 30, led by Indigenous organisations, with support described as coming from donations including the Amazon Fund and Conservation International Brazil.

== Funding and conservation finance ==
Programme activities have been supported through conservation-finance mechanisms that include Global Environment Facility (GEF) grants under the Amazon Sustainable Landscapes Program, UNDP–GEF project financing in the Cerrado/MATOPIBA, and Amazon Fund-supported initiatives such as Tapajós Sustentável and Restaura Amazônia.

In the Amazon Sustainable Landscapes Project (ASL), GEF grants were provided to the Fundo Brasileiro para a Biodiversidade (FUNBIO) and to Conservation International do Brasil, and the programme is implemented by the World Bank under coordination by the Ministry of the Environment and Climate Change. A grant agreement for TF0A6056 set a maximum of US$30.33 million for CI Brazil to finance parts II–IV of the project and referenced a parallel US$30 million grant to FUNBIO for Part I. A second-phase additional-financing arrangement added the Getulio Vargas Foundation (FGV) as an additional executing organisation, while grant agreements with FUNBIO and CI Brazil continued.

The UNDP–GEF project Taking Deforestation Out of the Soy Supply Chain was implemented with a total budget of US$6.6 million and a planned completion date in July 2021.

The Amazon Fund is managed by the Brazilian Development Bank (BNDES) and has a participatory governance structure coordinated by Brazil's Ministry of the Environment, with representation from federal and state governments and civil society; it finances projects and calls for proposals using donor contributions and other resources. CI Brazil has received Amazon Fund support for projects such as Tapajós Sustentável in Pará.

In Restaura Amazônia, Amazon Fund resources are transferred to partner managers that administer calls for proposals and support monitoring and accountability processes. A 2024 call announced R$450 million for restoration projects, with CI Brazil selected as partner manager for Pará and Maranhão. In December 2024, calls associated with the initiative were described as aiming to select projects to restore 146,000 hectares (1,460 km^{2}) in the Amazon, with macrorregião 3 (Pará and Maranhão) reported as allocated R$36 million for six projects under CI Brazil's management. In April 2025, a R$150 million call focused on ecological restoration of Indigenous Lands and maintained CI Brazil as partner manager for Pará and Maranhão.

Amazon Fund resources and donor contributions also supported establishment of the Fundo Kayapó mechanism for projects in Kayapó Indigenous Lands via FUNBIO, including an initial Amazon Fund contribution described as equivalent to a US$4 million donation from Conservation International; CI Brazil was described as participating in governance structures linked to the mechanism. A 2025 grant cycle supported workshops led by Indigenous organisations in preparation for COP 30, with support described as coming from donations including the Amazon Fund and Conservation International Brazil.

The organisation publishes governance and financial-disclosure documents through its transparency portal, including audited financial statements.

== Impact and evaluation ==
A terminal evaluation assessed implementation and results of Taking Deforestation Out of the Soy Supply Chain (2017–2021), including progress against outcomes and indicators, stakeholder engagement and project management arrangements.

The evaluation rated the project's overall outcome as "moderately satisfactory" and reported that, by November 2021, around 85% of the total budget had been disbursed; it also concluded that none of the three project-objective indicators would be met and that only two of thirteen outcome-level targets would be met. It identified the establishment of the Matopiba Coalition and a multistakeholder dialogue platform as an important legacy, while also concluding that the project design and theory of change were not sufficiently aligned with the complexity of deforestation drivers and leverage points within the timeframe and resources available, and that political transition and the COVID-19 pandemic affected implementation conditions.

Recommendations included focusing any follow-on phase on a smaller number of priority municipalities informed by more detailed diagnostics, providing resources to sustain the Matopiba Coalition beyond project funding, following up on implementation of policy proposals developed by the project, continuing work on compliance with social and environmental safeguards relevant to soy expansion, and ensuring that tools developed by the project are accompanied by capacity-building and resources for adoption beyond pilot use.

Implementation status and results reporting for the Amazon Sustainable Landscapes Project provided periodic monitoring during implementation, including performance ratings, risk updates, disbursement status and reporting against project indicators.
