= Conus cargilei =

Scientific classification
- Kingdom: Animalia
- Phylum: Mollusca
- Class: Gastropoda
- Subclass: Caenogastropoda
- Order: Neogastropoda
- Superfamily: Conoidea
- Family: Conidae
- Genus: Conus
- Species: C. cargilei

Binomial name
- Conus cargilei Coltro, 2004

Synonyms
- Conus (Dauciconus) cargilei Coltro, 2004 · accepted, alternate representation; Poremskiconus cargilei (Coltro, 2004)

Species of sea snail

Conus cargilei is a species of sea snail, a marine gastropod mollusk in the family Conidae, the cone snails, cone shells or cones.

These snails are predatory and venomous. They are capable of stinging humans.

== Description ==
The size of the shell varies between 11 mm and 30 mm.

== Distribution ==
This marine species occurs by the Abrolhos Archipelago in the Atlantic Ocean, off Brazil's southern Bahia coast.
