= Parcel das Paredes =

Coordinates: 17°49′S 38°57′W

- Submerged bank Parcel das Paredes (South Atlantic)
- Interactive map of Parcel das Paredes
- Sea: Atlantic Ocean
- Area: Abrolhos Reef Complex
- Country: Brazil

Area
  - Total: 200 km^{2} (77 sq mi)

Languages
  - Official: Portuguese

Parcel das Paredes is a large submerged bank in Brazil with an area of about 200 km^{2}. It is a coralline structure located in the Atlantic Ocean off the shore near Caravelas, Bahia State.

== Geography ==
The Parcel das Paredes lies about 30 km east of the continental shore. Although the reef is submerged, parts of it lie above water at low tide. It is a dangerous area for navigation, but an excellent fishing and scuba-diving ground. The Abrolhos Archipelago lies 35 km further to the east and this Parcel is part of the same structure. The maximum tide amplitude in the reef area is approximately 1.7 m.

Together with the Timbebas Reef located about 40 km to the north of the Parcel das Paredes, as well as the Sebastiao Gomes Reef, Coroa Vermelha Reef and the Viçosa Reef to the southwest, all these reefs are part of the National Marine Park of Abrolhos (NMPA).

== See also ==
- Placer (geography)
