= Ilha de Santa Bárbara =

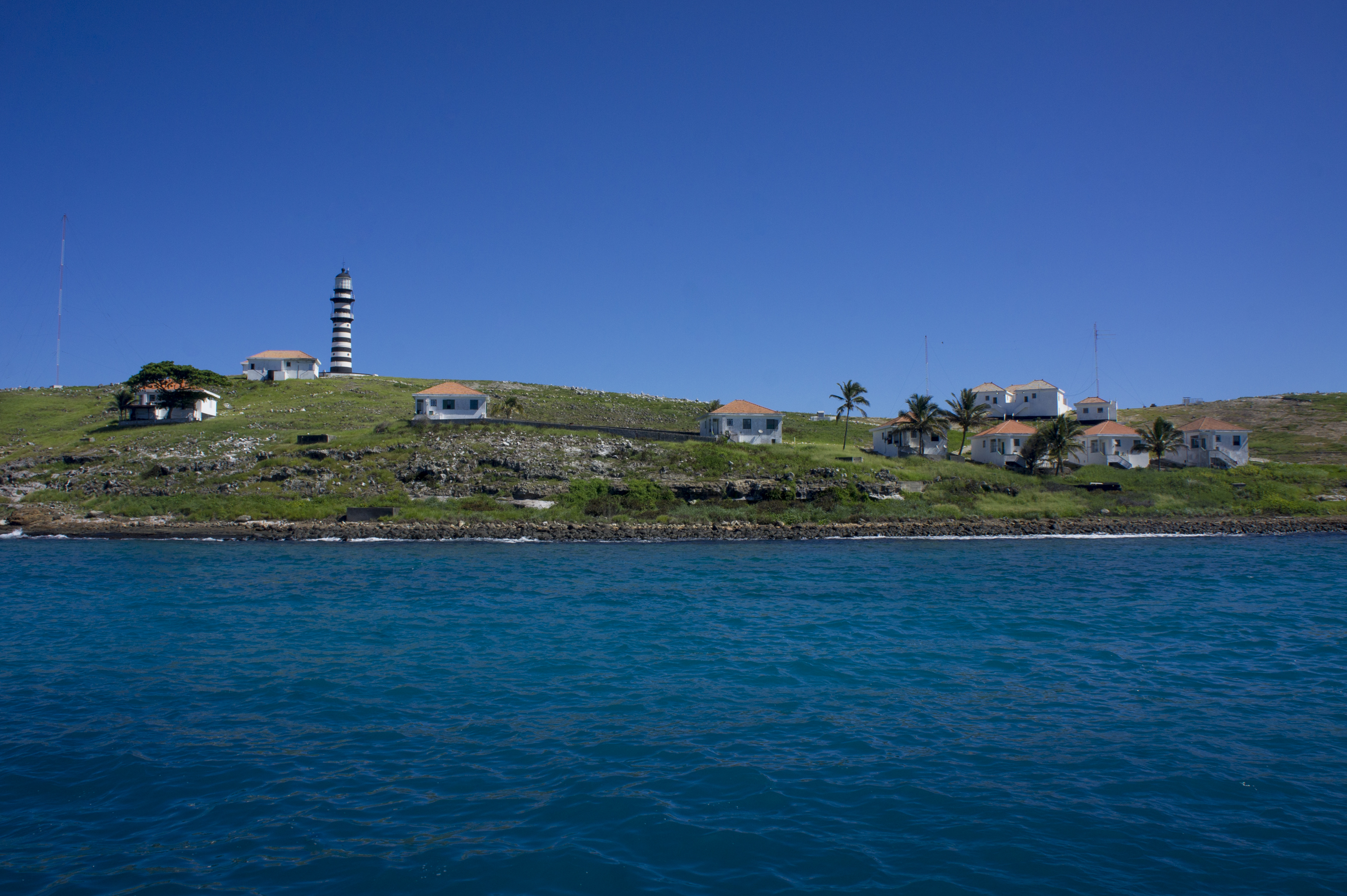
- View of the island in the background
- Interactive map of Ilha de Santa Bárbara

Geography
- Coordinates: 17°57′46.73″S 38°41′55.14″W

Administration
- Brazil
- Region: Northeast Region
- State: Bahia

Ilha de Santa Bárbara (transl. Santa Barbara Island) is the largest island in the Abrolhos Archipelago, measuring 1.5 km (0.93 mi) long, 300 m (980 ft) wide and 35 m (115 ft) above sea level, it belongs to the Brazilian Navy and is not included in the limits of Abrolhos Marine National Park nor under its jurisdiction and because it is a military base, disembarkation is allowed only with authorization from the II Naval District, located in Salvador.

A chapel was built in honor of Saint Barbara, and a small classroom was also built that serves children of sailors who live there with their family. There are other constructions such as a boat garage, a helipad and a French-made lighthouse on the highest point of the island, which was inaugurated in 1861 during the reign of Pedro II.

The island is known for a population of goats that managed to thrive on the island for about 200 years, despite the island having no known fresh water source.

== See also ==
- List of islands of Brazil
