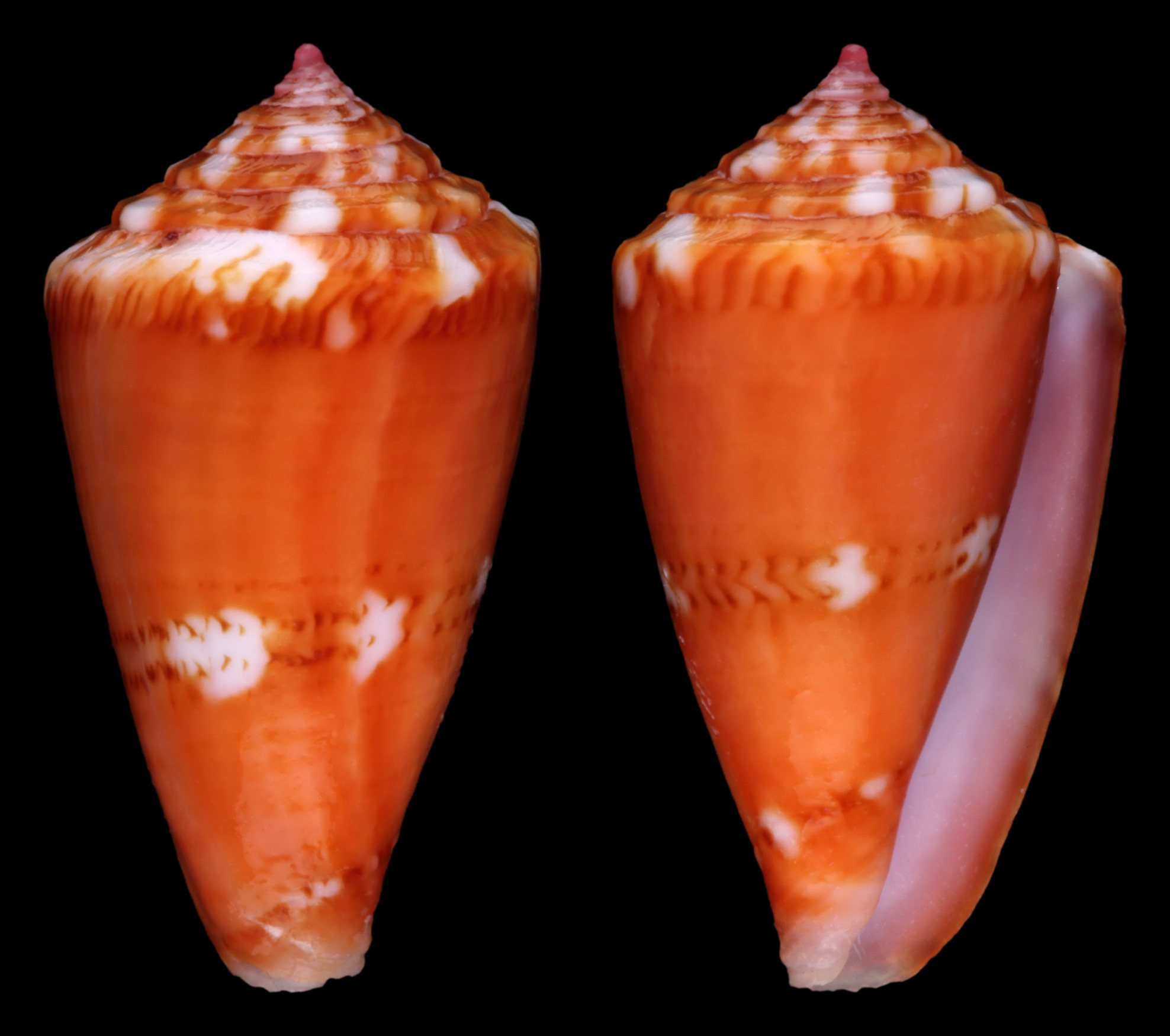

Scientific classification
- Domain: Eukaryota
- Kingdom: Animalia
- Phylum: Mollusca
- Class: Gastropoda
- Subclass: Caenogastropoda
- Order: Neogastropoda
- Superfamily: Conoidea
- Family: Conidae
- Genus: Conus
- Species: C. pseudocardinalis

Binomial name
- Conus pseudocardinalis Coltro, 2004

Synonyms
- Conus (Dauciconus) pseudocardinalis Coltro, 2004 · accepted, alternate representation; Purpuriconus pseudocardinalis (Coltro, 2004)

= Conus pseudocardinalis =

Species of sea snail

Conus pseudocardinalis is a species of sea snail, a marine gastropod mollusk in the family Conidae, the cone snails, cone shells or cones.

These snails are predatory and venomous. They are capable of stinging humans.

== Description ==
The size of the shell varies between 14 mm and 32 mm.

== Distribution ==
This marine species occurs off the Abrolhos Archipelago, Eastern Brazil.
