= Placer =

Placer may refer to one of the following:

- Placer deposit
- Placer sheep
- Placer mining
- Placer (geography), a submerged bank or reef.
- Placer (rugby league)
- Placer, a job title in the Pottery industry.

Geographical names:

- Placer, Masbate, Philippines
- Placer, Surigao del Norte, Philippines
- Placer, former name of Loomis, California
- Placer County, California, United States
