= Conus castaneus =

Scientific classification
- Domain: Eukaryota
- Kingdom: Animalia
- Phylum: Mollusca
- Class: Gastropoda
- Subclass: Caenogastropoda
- Order: Neogastropoda
- Superfamily: Conoidea
- Family: Conidae
- Genus: Conus
- Species: C. castaneus

Binomial name
- Conus castaneus Kiener, 1848

Synonyms
- Conus (Dauciconus) castaneus Kiener, 1848 · accepted, alternate representation; Gradiconus castaneus (Kiener, 1848)

Species of sea snail

Conus castaneus is a species of sea snail, a marine gastropod mollusk in the family Conidae, the cone snails, cone shells or cones.

These snails are predatory and venomous. They are capable of stinging humans.

== Description ==
The size of the shell varies between 11 mm and 30 mm.

== Distribution ==
This marine species of cone snail occurs in the Caribbean Sea and off the Abrolhos Archipelago, Eastern Brazil.
