= Gorda =

Gorda may refer to:

- Gorda, California, United States, a small town on the Pacific Ocean
- Gorda Plate, a tectonic plate located beneath the Pacific Ocean near northern California
- Cayo Gorda, a small island of Honduras in Caribbean Sea
- Gorda, fat in Spanish and Portuguese
