= Cayman Ridge =

Undersea mountain range in the Caribbean Sea

Coordinates: 19°31′22.8″N 80°43′13.8″W

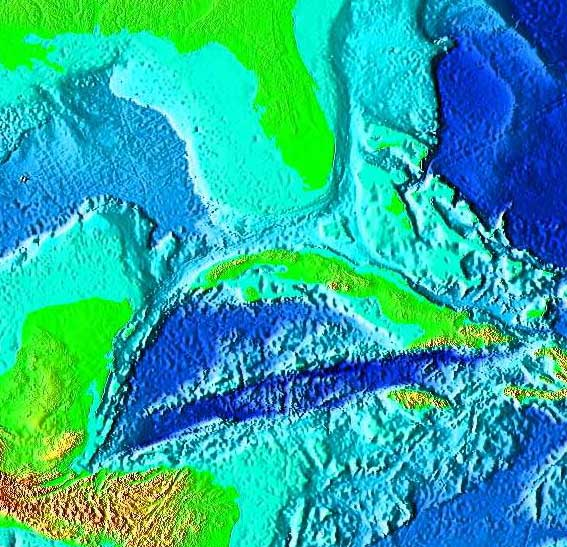
- Cayman Ridge and Cayman Trough.

Geography
- Location within the Caribbean
- Location: Caribbean Sea
- Countries: Cuba; Cayman Islands; Honduras

The Cayman Ridge is an undersea mountain range on the northern margin of the Cayman Trough in the Caribbean Sea. It extends from the Sierra Maestra in the east to the Misteriosa Bank and Rosario Bank in the west, a distance of about 1,500 km (930 mi). The Cayman Ridge also includes the Cayman Islands.

The ridge formed as an island arc when the Cayman Trough was the site of a subduction zone during the Paleocene and Eocene epochs. As the dynamics of the area changed, the subduction zone became a transform fault zone with a pull-apart basin during which time volcanism had dwindled along the entire length of the arc. The Cayman Ridge is now an inactive volcanic zone.
