= BR-135 (Brazil highway) =

Highway in Brazil

BR-135

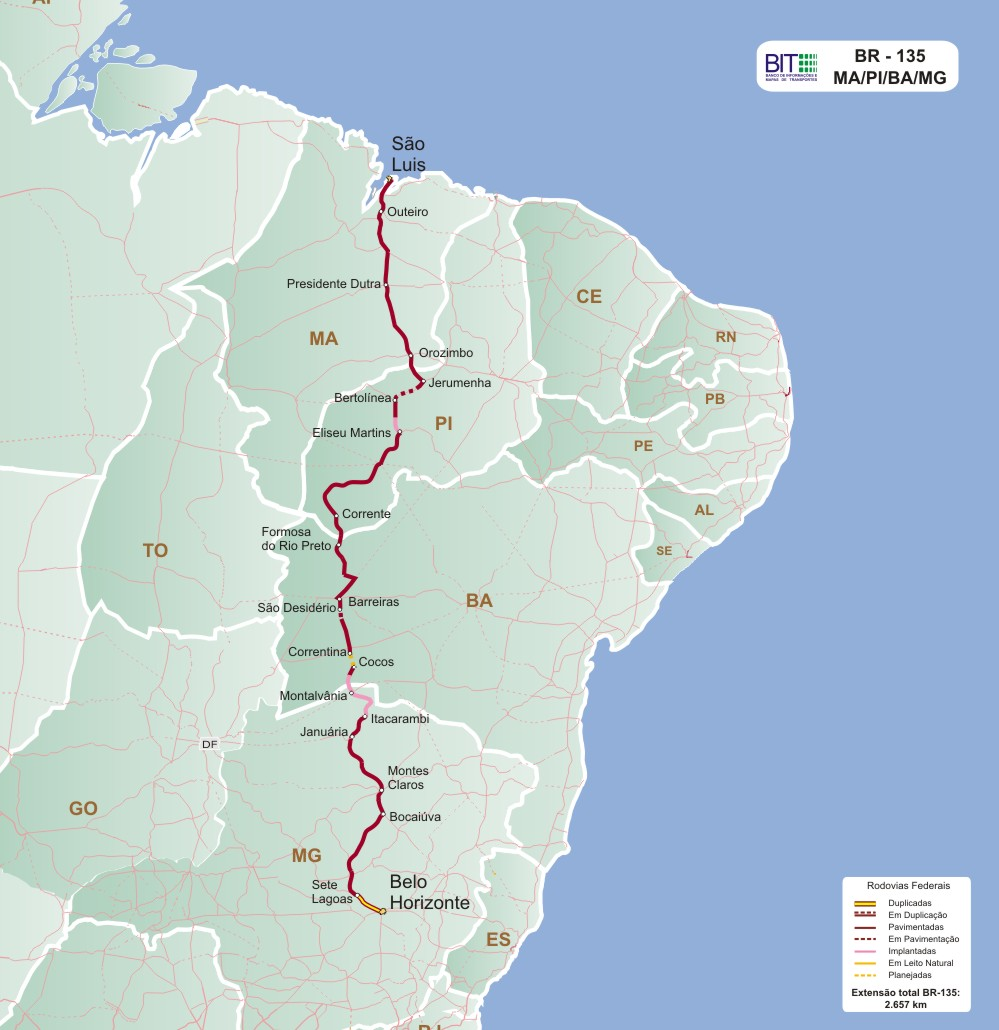

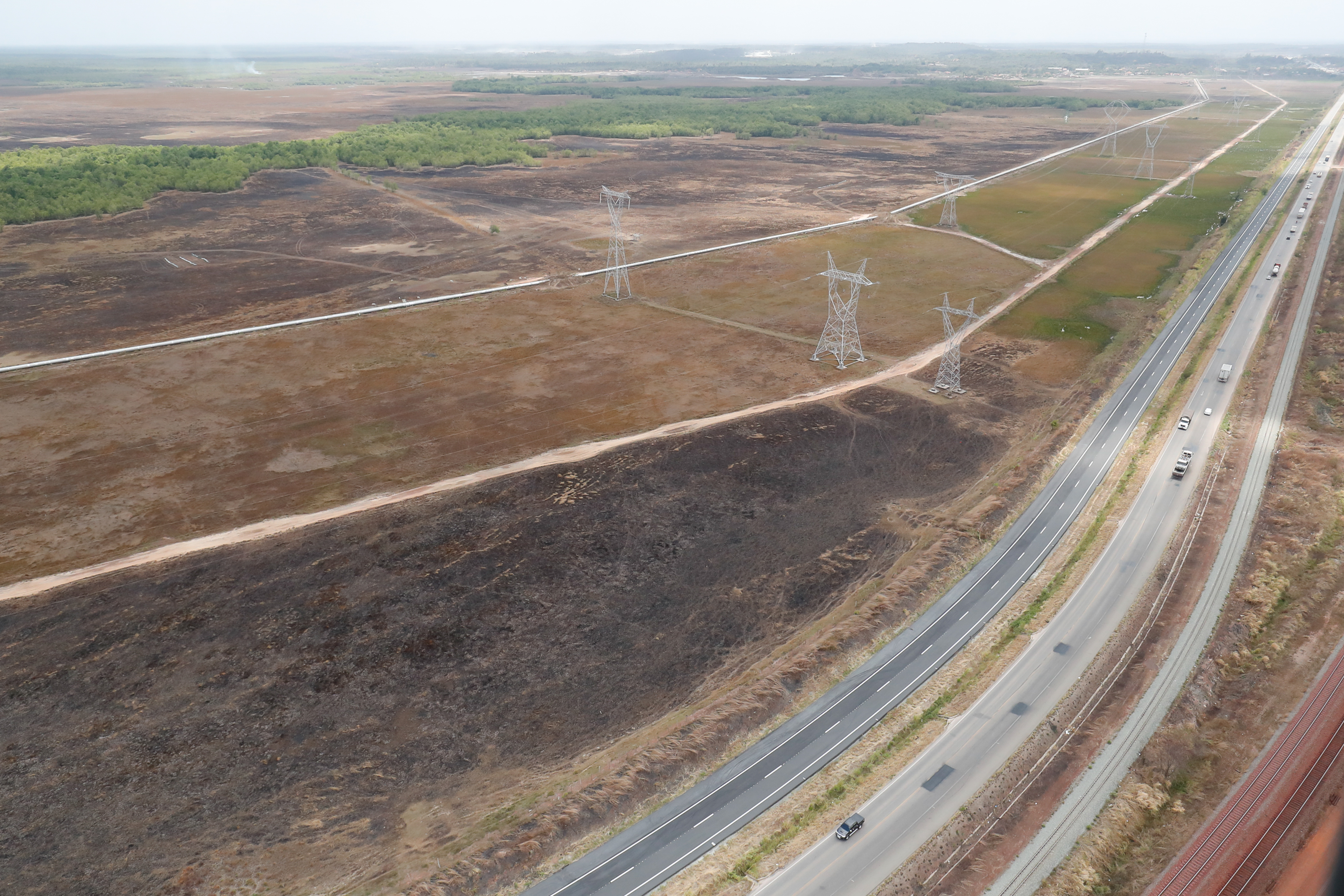
- Section of BR-135 in Maranhão.

Route information
- Length: 2,518.5 km (1,564.9 mi)

Major junctions
- North end: São Luís, Maranhão
- South end: Belo Horizonte, Minas Gerais

Location
- Country: Brazil

Highway system
- Highways in Brazil; Federal

BR-135 is a federal highway of Brazil. The 2,518-kilometre road connects São Luís to Belo Horizonte.

The road passes through the MATOPIBA region (in the south of Maranhão and Piauí and in the west of Bahia), which is an important producer of soy, corn and cotton, among others products, and Minas Gerais, which is the largest Brazilian producer of minerals and gemstones, in addition to having a strong agricultural sector.
