= Alcobaça, Bahia =

Municipality of Bahia, Brazil

Alcobaça
- Municipality
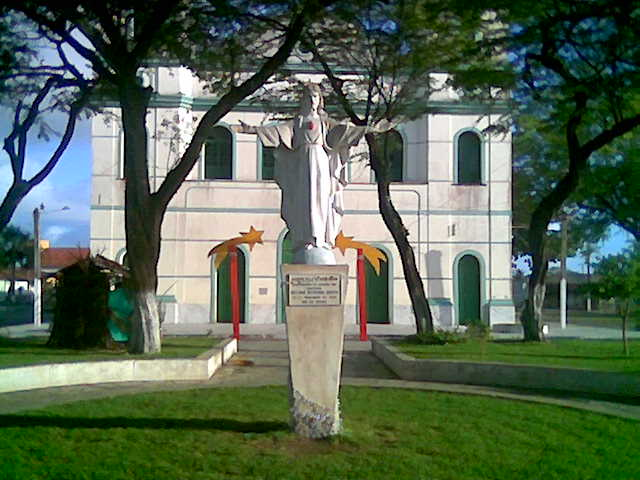
- Church in Alcobaça

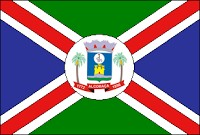
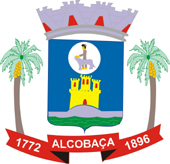
- Flag Coat of arms

- Location in Bahia
- Coordinates: 17.519°S 39.196°W
- Country: Brazil
- State: Bahia

Population (2020)
  - Total: 22,490
- Time zone: UTC−3 (BRT)

Alcobaça is a municipality of Bahia, Brazil.

The municipality contains part of the Cassurubá Extractive Reserve, a 100,768-hectare (249,000-acre) sustainable use conservation unit that protects an area of mangroves, river and sea where shellfish are harvested. The Timbebas reef opposite Alcobaça is part of the 91,330-hectare (225,700-acre) Abrolhos Marine National Park, a conservation unit created in 1983.
