= New Utopia =

Micronation

- Unrecognized micronation
- Claimed by: Howard Turney
- Dates claimed: 1995–2012, 2017–?
- Area claimed: Misteriosa Bank

New Utopia, officially the Principality of New Utopia, is a micronation claiming the Misteriosa Bank, an unclaimed undersea rise of land in the Caribbean Sea off the Cayman Islands where it is hoped to build structures raised up from the underwater land. It was first proclaimed on 13 April 1999 by American businessman Howard Turney ("Prince Lazarus"), under the name Lazarus Long; the project has recently been revived (in early 2017).

== History ==
The project was founded in 1995 when Lazarus Long, the founder of New Utopia, came across a shallow unclaimed underwater area in the Caribbean Sea. He then filed a claim with the United Nations. Long raised up to $100 million from investors from all over the world, with a majority coming from the United States. Then, the U.S. Securities and Exchange Commission (US SEC) termed New Utopia a "fraudulent nationwide Internet scheme", and complained that Long had made "material misrepresentations and omissions concerning, among other things, the status of construction of the project, the companies associated with the project, the safety of the investment, and the status of the Commission's investigation into his activities." The SEC's case against Long (SEC v. Lazarus Long) ruled against Long.

New Utopia's project was restarted in early 2017 by Lazarus Long's daughter Elizabeth Henderson, who promised to have the Project completed by 2021. The project has not had any updates since.

== Structure ==
The social model and trade system would have been hyper-capitalistic, modeled after the writings of Ayn Rand, Napoleon Hill, Robert Heinlein, Dale Carnegie, and Adam Smith. Long also promised that the tiny nation would have a clinic better than the Mayo Clinic, a casino modelled after the Monte Carlo Casino, and "the ultimate luxury spa". Residents would live in one of the 642 apartments and condominiums that would be built. It would have been a tax haven, with all services paid for by a 20% tax on imported consumable goods.

== Founder ==
Before creating New Utopia, Howard Turney had been introduced to the Human Growth Hormone (HGH) by an anti-aging doctor. He was so impressed with the results that he became an advocate of the hormone and in February 1993 he created a longevity spa called El Dorado Clinic in Playa del Carmen, Mexico. In 1995 he changed his name to Lazarus Long, a recurrent character in Heinlein's novels who goes through several rejuvenation treatments in order to live hundreds of years and eventually become immortal. Also around 1995 he stopped injecting HGH in the El Dorado clinic because of the corruption of local officers, and he moved to the US. A few years later he had to stop injecting HGH also in the US when doctors stopped prescribing it due to illegal doping in sport. Then he tried to fund New Utopia, a place where the government couldn't tell him what he could do and what he couldn't. But in 1999 the SEC closed his bond offering because the bonds were not registered with them. He dedicated the rest of his life to the creation of New Utopia.

Lazarus Long died on 26 April 2012 at the age of 80.

== See also ==
- List of micronations
- Dominion of Melchizedek – Micronation
- Republic of Minerva – 1972 micronation in the Pacific Ocean
