= Swan Islands, Honduras =

Island group of Honduras

Swan Islands
Native name: Islas Santanilla
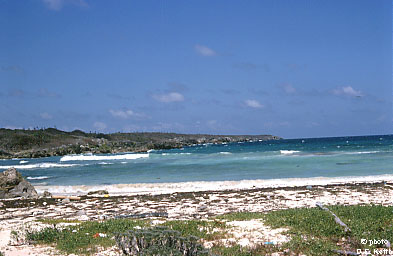
- Little Swan Island

- Location within the Caribbean

Geography
- Location: Caribbean Sea
- Coordinates: 17°24′38″N 83°55′19″W
- Archipelago: Bay Islands
- Area: 3.1 km^{2} (1.2 sq mi)

Administration
- Honduras
- Department: Bay Islands
- Municipality: Islas de la Bahia

Demographics
- Population: 10 (2014)

The Swan Islands (Spanish: Islas Santanilla or Islas del Cisne, named Islas de las Pozas by Christopher Columbus in 1502) is a chain of three islands located in the northwestern Caribbean Sea, approximately 153 km (95 mi) northeast of the eastern coast of Honduras, with a combined land area of 3.1 km^{2} (1.2 sq mi).

The islands are uninhabited except for a small permanent Honduran naval garrison stationed on Great Swan Island that maintains the Islas del Cisne Airport.

== Geography ==
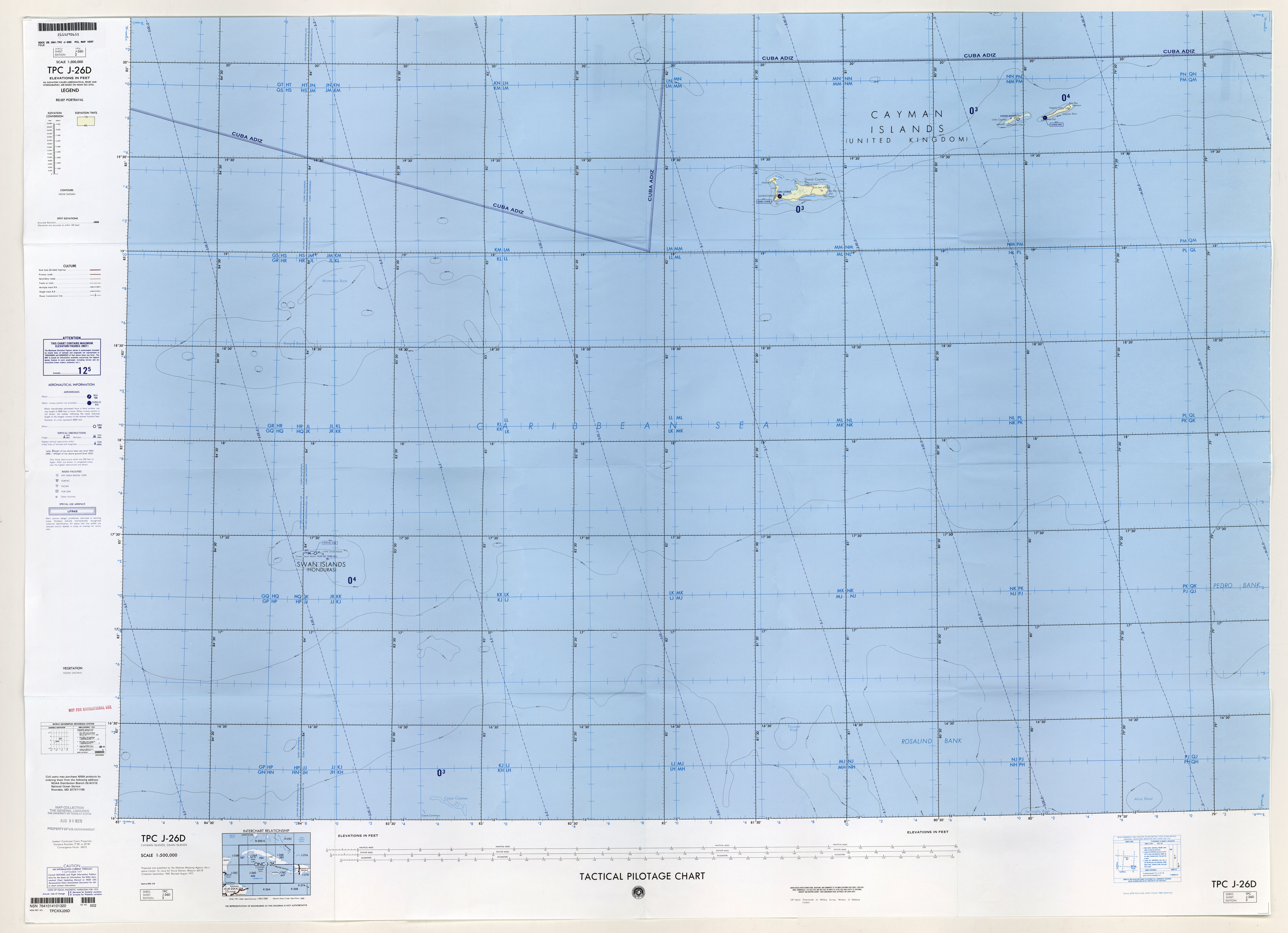
Map including the Swan Islands (DMA, 1977)

The Swan Islands lie within the exclusive economic zone of Honduras and belong to the Islas de la Bahía department of Honduras. They consist of three islands:

- Great Swan Island (3 km long, 2 km^{2})
- Little Swan Island (2.4 km long, 0.5 km wide, 1.2 km^{2})
- Booby Cay (90 metres long, 70 m off the southwestern corner of Great Swan Island, <0.01 km^{2})

Rosario Bank and Misteriosa Bank are 130 to 150 km (81–93 mi) north of the Swan Islands and separated from them by the >5,000 m (16,404 ft) deep Cayman Trench.

=== Important Bird Area ===
The islands are part of the Islas de la Bahía y Cayos Cochinos Important Bird Area (IBA), designated as such by BirdLife International because they support significant populations of white-crowned pigeons, chimney swifts and yellow-naped amazons.

== History ==
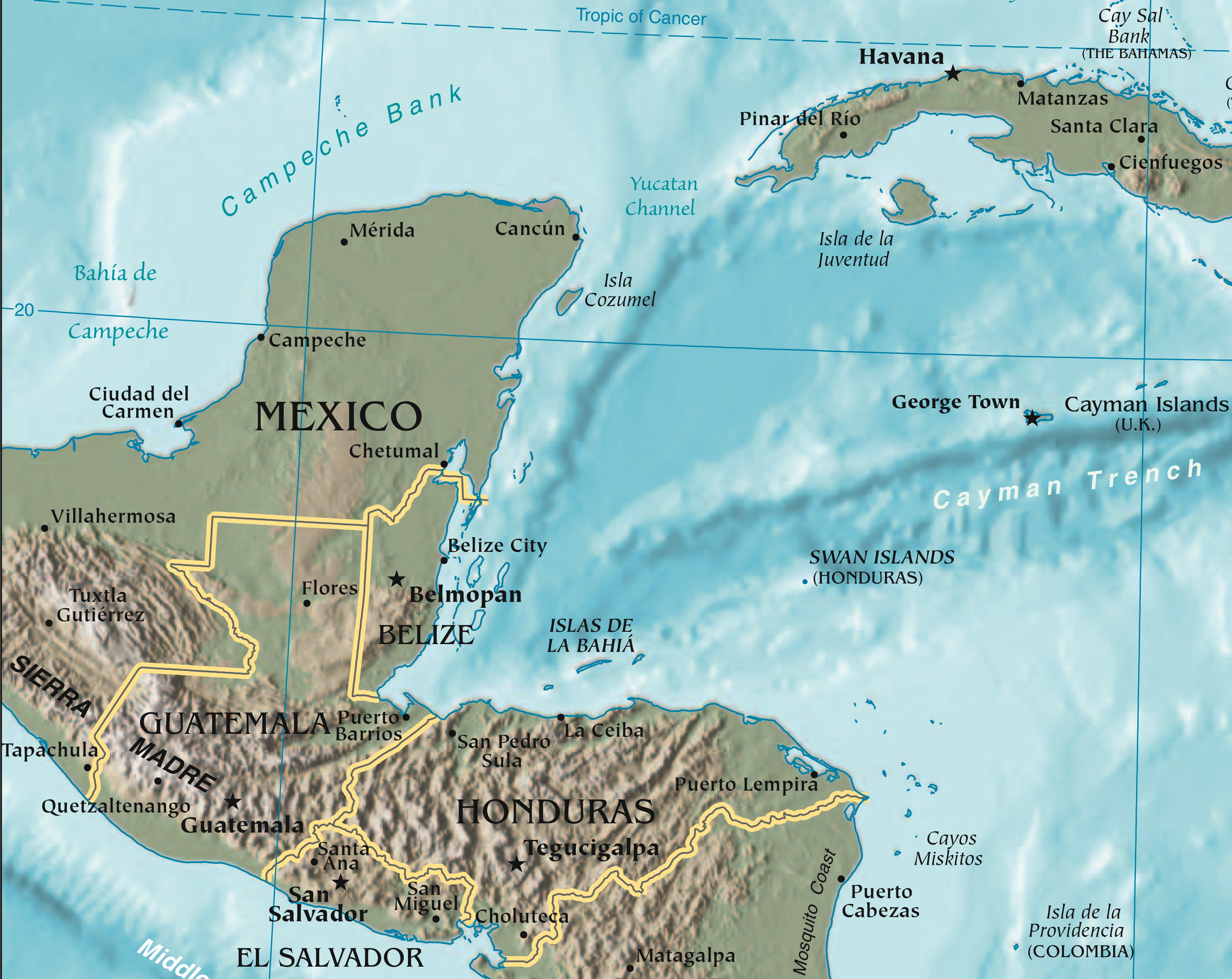
Area map

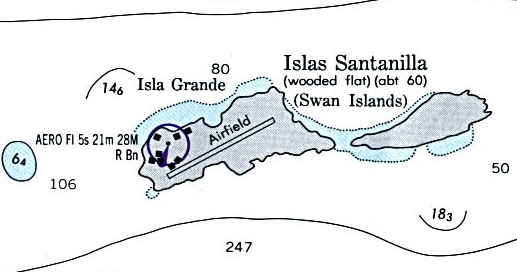
Nautical chart of the Swan Islands

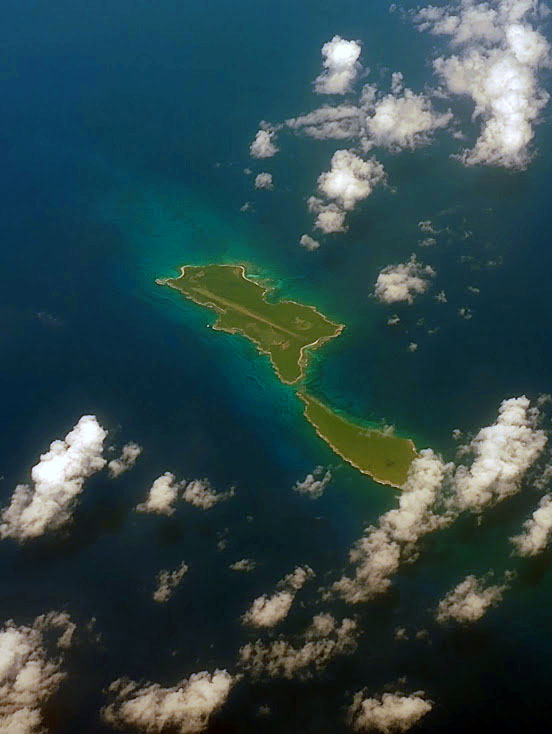
Aerial view.

The Swan Islands were encountered by Christopher Columbus in 1502 and named the Islas de las Pozas. In the 18th century, they were renamed the Swan Islands, after Charles Swan, the captain of the Cygnet, whom pirates captured and forced to join them.

American entrepreneurs first started exporting guano as a fertilizer in the 1840s. The American-owned, New York-City-headquartered "Atlantic and Pacific Guano Company" was established in the 1840s and started exporting fertilizer, based on guano collected on the Swan Islands. In 1856, the United States apparently claimed the islands. In April 1857, John Valentine White claimed the islands, by virtue of the Guano Islands Act; later that year, he transferred all interest in these islands to Charles Sterns, Joseph W. Fabens, and Duff Green. Messers Sterns, Fabens, and Green incorporated the Atlantic and Pacific Guano Company, which issued 50,000 shares at a price of $100 each for a total capitalization of $5,000,000 in 1858. The company even issued currency, signed by William H. Whitfield, in 25-cent, 50-cent, and one-dollar denominations on June 1, 1867, to facilitate commerce on the islands.

Subsequently, a chemical company bought the islands but became insolvent. Captain Alonzo Adams sailed there in 1893 and took possession of the islands; in 1904, he assigned ownership to the Swan Island Commercial Company. That company leased part of Great Swan Island to the United Fruit Company, which grew coconut palms and set up a wireless radio relay station for servicing their Caribbean fleet but eventually abandoned the lease. The Swan Island Commercial Company provided hurricane monitoring data from 1928 to 1932. The U.S. Weather Bureau staffed a hurricane weather station on Great Swan from 1938 onward, but only during hurricane seasons.

During World War II, both the U.S. Navy and the U.S. Weather Bureau stationed personnel on the island. In the late 1940s until 1949, Swan Island became a U.S. Department of Agriculture animal quarantine station for the importation of beef. In 1914, what now is the National Weather Service (NWS) and, later, the Federal Aviation Agency (FAA) set up meteorological and communication assets on Swan to support aeronautical services and hurricane-prediction activities. The FAA departed Swan Island in the 1960s, leaving the NWS all assets and responsibilities.

Honduras claimed these islands from 1923, asserting that, because Columbus had encountered the islands while sailing for Spain, they should be owned by the nearest Spanish-speaking country. Both the United States and Honduras claimed the Swan Islands until the United States dropped its claim under the Guano Islands Act. Treaty of the Swan Islands was signed on November 22, 1971, and clear title by Honduras became effective September 1, 1972. The ownership of the island had long been in dispute. The Sumner Smith family has always maintained their ownership and, apparently, did have some standing in the U.S. courts. Nevertheless, the American government chose to abandon its claim despite this standing (ref. D S Platt, et al., NOAA-NWS). The islands gained notoriety in the early 1960s from the activities of Radio Swan, which began broadcasting in May 1960 during the preparation for and, later, the conduct of the Bay of Pigs Invasion of Cuba. The station was removed from the islands in the late 1960s, its main transmitter then transferred for use in the Vietnam War.

In 1965, Bellaire, Texas, police questioned a former Bellaire High School student about his role in a teenage "army" dedicated to freeing "oppressed countries," the Houston Chronicle reported. The group, called the Kononiers, had been in existence for about five years, the student told the newspaper, and was armed through a series of burglaries of the Deep River Armory store. The weapons were taken to the Addicks Reservoir area, where they trained for combat. The youths were training for "Operation Liberation Swan Island" off Honduras.

In 1987, the Los Angeles Times reported that the CIA and other American governmental agencies had a covert training facility on Swan Island for Nicaraguan Contras. In 1989, the president of Honduras, Rafael Leonardo Callejas, declared the island a protected wildlife refuge.

In October 1998, Hurricane Mitch moved through the area with winds of 290 km/h (180 mph).

In 2001, Swan Island Development, LLC, of Brooksville, Florida, announced plans to develop the Swan Islands by 2010, in partnership with the government of Honduras. Luxury real estate and hotels, valued at five billion dollars, were envisioned, with a main city named Cygnet. In 2004, Swan Island Development also announced plans to establish a human stem-cell research center. As of 2021, neither has occurred.

In July 2023, President Xiomara Castro of Honduras announced plans to build an isolated prison on the island for up to 2,000 gang leaders.

== See also ==
- Insular area
- List of Guano Island claims
- Honduras – United Kingdom Maritime Delimitation Treaty
