= La Guaira Bank =

La Guaira Bank Placer de la Guaira
- Submerged bank
- Location within Venezuela Location within the Caribbean
- Coordinates: 10°50′N 67°7′W
- Sea: Caribbean
- Area: La Guaira
- Country: Venezuela
- State: Vargas State
- Minimum depth: 60 m

Languages
  - Official: Spanish

La Guaira Bank (Spanish: Placer de la Guaira), is a large, completely submerged bank in Venezuela. It is located in the Caribbean Sea 20 km to the NNE off the northern shore of La Guaira.

This reef has an excellent reputation for deep-sea angling. Currents create an upwelling of nutrients that attracts large pelagic fish such as sailfish, marlin, yellowfin tuna and mahi-mahi.

== Geography ==
The La Guaira Bank is a Pleistocene structure that is wholly submerged. It is 19 km long and 6 km wide. Its depths range between 60 and 70 m, rising from the 260 m deep surrounding seabed of the continental platform. La Guaira Bank is located close to the Carayaca Bank (Spanish: Placer de Carayaca), another structure that rises between 50 and 100 m from the surface.

== See also ==
- Placer (geography)
- Battle of La Guaira (1812)
