= Misteriosa Bank =

Misteriosa Bank Placer de la Misteriosa
- Submerged bank Misteriosa Bank (Central America)
- Interactive map of Misteriosa Bank; Placer de la Misteriosa
- Coordinates: 18°48′N 83°54′W
- Sea: Caribbean
- Country: Honduras
- Department: Bay Islands Department
- Minimum depth: 20 m
- Geology: Cayman Ridge
- Special clause: Annex B, commercial fishing for domestic trade Cayman Islands (authorized: Lutjanus campechanus and Epinephelus lanceolatus; prohibited: crustaceans and Mollusca), annual fishing quota 25 MT, fishing vessels ≤100 ft, under established regulations.

Area
  - Total: 322 km^{2} (124 sq mi)

The Misteriosa Bank (Spanish: Placer de la Misteriosa) is a submerged bank or atoll in the Caribbean Sea, located at 18°48′N 83°54′W – approximately equidistant from Mexico (380 km or 210 nmi), Honduras (345 km or 186 nmi) and Cuba (320 km or 170 nmi).

== Geographical data ==
The Misteriosa Bank is 39 km (24 mi) long and 3 to 11 km (1.9 to 6.8 mi) wide. Its area is 322 km^{2} (124 sq mi). Immediately south of it is Rosario Bank. The closest piece of land is the Swan Islands, Honduras, 140 km (76 nmi) to the south and separated from it by the more than 5,000-metre-deep (16,000 ft) Cayman Trough. The reported depth is 20 metres (66 ft) on the average or up to 22 metres (72 ft), with depths of 14–18 metres (46–59 ft) along the rim, or 12.8–49 metres (42–161 ft). It is part of the Cayman Ridge.

It is part of a cluster of seamounts of the Cayman mountain range contained in Honduras (Misteriosa, Rosario, Maud, Albion and Viciosas).

== History ==
The bank was first reported by Spanish navigator Tomás Nicolás de Villa in April 1787.

In the 19th century, Charles Darwin mentioned the Misteriosa Bank as an example of the sharply descending coral reef in his book Coral Reefs:

Besides the coast-banks, there are many of various dimensions which stand quite isolated; these closely resemble each other, they lie from two or three to twenty or thirty fathoms [4 to 55 m] under water, and are composed of sand, sometimes firmly agglutinated, with little or no coral; their surfaces are smooth and nearly level, shelving only to the amount of a few fathoms, very gradually all round towards their edges, where they plunge abruptly into the unfathomable sea. This steep inclination of their sides, which is likewise characteristic of the coast-banks, is very remarkable: I may give as an instance, the Misteriosa Bank, on the edges of which the soundings change in 250 fathoms [460 m] horizontal distance, from 11 to 210 fathoms [20 to 380 m]...

Currently, a buoy has been anchored to the seabed of this feature. It appears to have been claimed by the Principality of New Utopia. The placing of the buoy was filmed by a German film crew and broadcast by Arte television on satellite. New Utopia maintains no state claims and wants to build a form of micronation on top of it, using concrete blocks.

== See also ==
- Placer (geography)
