= BR-235 (Brazil highway) =

Highway in Brazil

BR-235

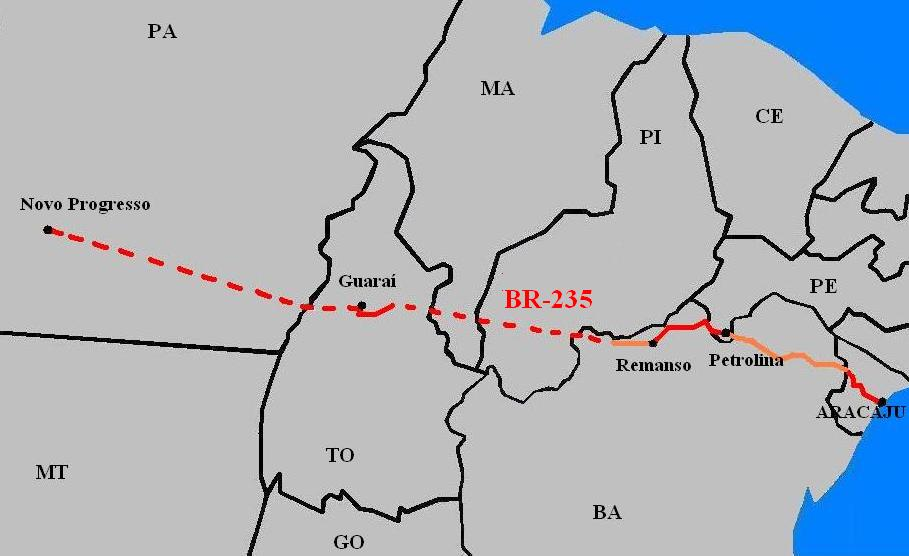

Route information
- Length: 2,093.5 km (1,300.8 mi)

Major junctions
- East end: Aracaju, Sergipe
- West end: Novo Progresso, Pará

Location
- Country: Brazil

Highway system
- Highways in Brazil; Federal

The BR-235 is a Brazilian federal highway that connects the cities of Aracaju, in the state of Sergipe, to Novo Progresso, Pará. It has a total length of 2,093.5 km.

It is one of the most complicated roads in Brazil, since there is no asphalt on most of the road and there are still many non-existent sections. Until 2018, there was only asphalt in the State of Sergipe, and near the city of Petrolina. No section was built in Maranhão, while in Pará only a 21 km section was constructed between the Araguaia river crossing (via ferry) and the city of Santa Maria das Barreiras.

Since the government of Jair Bolsonaro, in 2019, the road where it was made of earth began to be paved, and it was constructed where it did not exist, since it has great economic importance: the MATOPIBA region (in the south of Maranhão and Piauí, in western Bahia and Tocantins) is an important producer of soybeans, corn and cotton, among other products; the area of Juazeiro, Petrolina and Casa Nova is an important producer of fruits and also of goats and sheep. The highway connects all these regions with the ports on the northeast coast of Brazil. In February 2020, for example, 77.6 kilometers of the road between Jeremoabo and Canché were paved.

== Current situation ==
=== Sergipe ===
In the 123 km within the state of Sergipe, the highway has been 100% paved for several years.

=== Bahia ===
In the state of Bahia there were about 658.4 km of highway implemented, between the border with Sergipe and close to the border with Piauí. Until mid-2018, only the stretch between Petrolina and Remanso was paved. From the Temer government in 2017, but mainly from the Bolsonaro government in 2018, the highway gained logistical importance and began to be completely paved. In February 2021, 77.6 km were paved in eastern Bahia, between Jeremoabo and Canché. At this time, the project, divided into ten lots, which aimed to pave all 658.4 km of the highway's extension in the state of Bahia, had eight paved lots (from 1 to 8), totaling 530.9 km asphalted. In August 2021, there were 62.3 km between the cities of Campo Alegre de Lourdes and Remanso receiving paving, with completion expected by the end of 2022.

=== Piauí ===
In Piauí, there is still a stretch of road that had never been implemented: 130 km between the cities of Caracol, Guaribas and Bom Jesus. In December 2020, 46.55 km were constructed and paved between Caracol and Guaribas. The remaining extension of the highway (82.96 km) is planned, from Guaribas to the city of Bom Jesus. From Bom Jesus, the highway continues for 290 km to the city of Santa Filomena, on the border with Maranhão.

=== Maranhão and Tocantins ===
From Maranhão, most of the highway is still unpaved, only having asphalt between the cities of Santa Maria do Tocantins and Guaraí, on the BR-153, Tocantins. The stretch between Santa Maria do Tocantins (TO) and Santa Filomena (PI) is not officially implemented: vehicles need to travel 380 km in a detour along the TO-245, which is still a dirt road.
