= Casa Nova =

Municipality of Bahia, Brazil

- Municipality
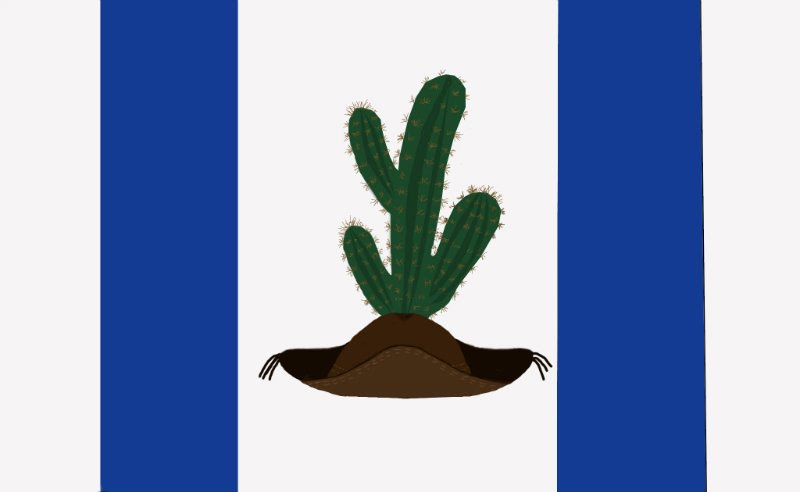
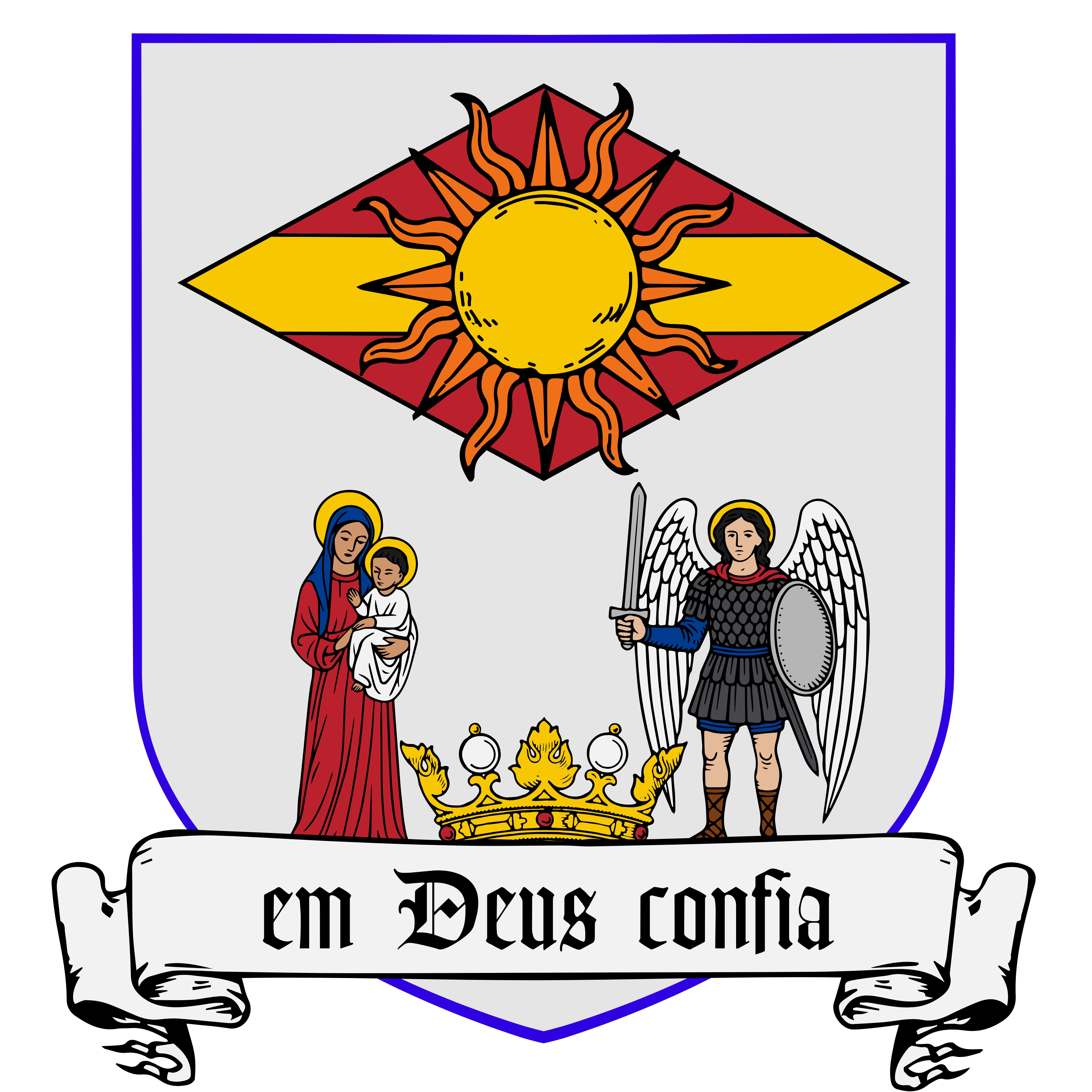
- Flag Coat of arms

- Location in Brazil
- Coordinates: 9°09′43″S 40°58′15″W
- Country: Brazil
- Region: Nordeste
- State: Bahia
- Founded: 1879

Government
  - Mayor: Anísio Viana

Area
  - Total: 3,725.477 sq mi (9,648.942 km^{2})
- Elevation: 1,368 ft (417 m)

Population (2026)
  - Total: 76,416
- Time zone: UTC−3 (BRT)
- Postal code: 47300-000
- Area code: 74
- Climate: BSh (hot semi-arid)
- Website: casanova.ba.gov.br

Casa Nova is a Brazilian municipality in the state of Bahia in the semi-arid northeast part of the country, called the Nordeste in Portuguese. In 2026, 76,416 inhabitants were estimated to reside within the jurisdiction. The city is aligned with agricultural and livestock trade and supports a developing fresh water beach tourism location at the Dunas do Velho Chico on the Sobradinho Reservoir.

== History ==
The city was founded in 1879 along the historical alignment of the São Francisco River. Part of its early development was focused on the discovery and commercialization of salt in the nineteenth century. Workers scraped salt-bearing earth from patches of dry, clay-rich alluvial ground and leached it in troughs of water to produce brine which was dried to recover the salt. Salt was traded across the region using river boats as a primary transportation mode.

The 1930s brought the Pau de Colher movement to the region which led to the 1938 Pau De Colher Massacre in the northwest boundary area of the Casa Nova municipality with the Brazilian state of Piaui.

In the 1970s, construction of the Sobradinho dam and hydroelectric project down river from Casa Nova resulted in the original city (now referred to as “Casa Nova Velha” in Portuguese or “Old Casa Nova” in English) to be flooded along with four other towns and cities as the Sobradinho Reservoir filled. The city and its population were relocated in 1976 and 1977 to higher ground north of the original location along the BR-235 roadway connecting points across northeast Brazil.

In the years since, various academicians have studied the socioeconomic challenges that were created by the forced relocations to develop lessons-learned to reduce the likelihood of adverse issues should similar hydroelectric dam development occur in other regions.

== Geography ==
Casa Nova is located on the banks of the São Francisco River in the Middle São Francisco region that spans from the city of Pirapora in the state of Minas Gerais to the Paulo Afonso Hydroelectric Complex in the state of Bahia.

Casa Nova lies within the Caatinga, a semiarid Brazilian biome characterized by seasonally dry woodland and thorny scrub, including drought-adapted trees, shrubs, cacti and bromeliads. The total area of the municipality is 9,648.94 square kilometers, making it one of the largest municipal territories in the state of Bahia.

== Economy ==
Casa Nova serves as a market hub for livestock producers in the surrounding rural area, with its traditional Feira do Bode (Bode is Portuguese for Goat) attracting hundreds of buyers from the municipality and neighboring communities.

Developments of grape vineyards enabled with irrigation water from the reservoir are now actively supporting production of an estimated 3 million bottles per year from the Grupo Miolo Terranova winery in Casa Nova.

In addition to the 1050 MW of electricity generated by the Sobradinho Hydroelectric facility in the neighboring municipality of Sobradinho, Casa Nova hosts the operating Casa Nova wind-energy complex, comprising three wind farms with approximately 88 MW of combined installed generating capacity.

Regional transportation is enabled by bus services from Casa Nova to the city of Petrolina, Juazeiro, and Salvador, the capital of the state of Bahia. Commercial air service is available from the Petrolina-Senador Nilo Coelho International Airport (IATA: PNZ) approximately 60km east of Casa Nova along BR-235.

== Tourism ==
The area near the flooded old town of Casa Nova included deposits of sedimentary limestone sand. The area, called the “Dunas do Velho Chico” (in Portuguese) or “Dunes of the Old Frank” (in English), Velho Chico referring to the local name for the Sao Francisco river, has created a fresh water sand beach that is drawing tourism interests.

The municipality also hosts a recurring festival - Festa do Interior - on annual basis in July. The 2026 edition was the 35th occurrence of the cultural and music celebration attracting participation from across the region.

== See also ==
- List of municipalities in Bahia
