= Rosario Bank =

Submerged former atoll in the Caribbean Sea

Rosario Bank Placer El Rosario
- Submerged bank Rosario Bank (Central America)
- Interactive map of Rosario Bank; Placer El Rosario
- Coordinates: 18°30′N 84°04′W
- Sea: Caribbean
- Country: Honduras
- Minimum depth: 18 m
- Geology: Cayman Ridge
- Special clause: Annex B, commercial fishing for domestic trade Cayman Islands (authorized: Lutjanus campechanus and Epinephelus lanceolatus; prohibited: crustaceans and Mollusca), annual fishing quota 25 MT, fishing vessels ≤100 ft, under established regulations.

Rosario Bank is a submerged former atoll in the southern Caribbean Sea, located less than 20 km south of Misteriosa Bank. It lies within Honduras's exclusive economic zone.

Rosario Bank is roughly rectangular in extent, being 16 kilometers long east-west, and eight kilometers wide. It has depths of 18 to 64 meters. The distance to the Honduran mainland at Punta Patuca in the south is 290 km, and to Banco Chinchorro off the Belize mainland in the west is about 330 km. The nearest dry land is on the Swan Islands, 112 km to the south.

It is part of a cluster of seamounts of the Cayman mountain range contained in Honduras (Misteriosa, Rosario, Maud, Albion and Viciosas).
