= MATOPIBA =

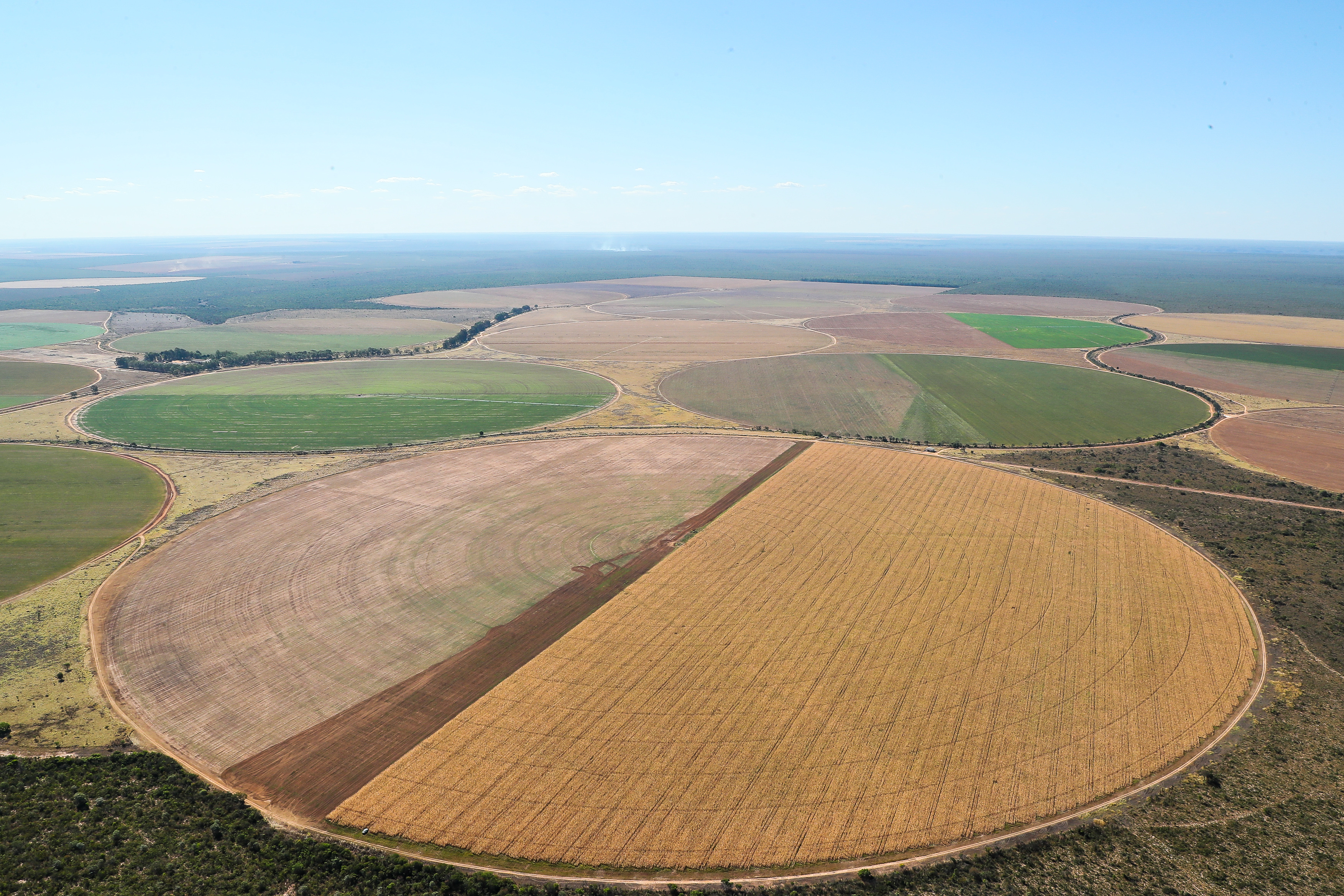
Monoculture, São Desidério, in the MATOPIBA region.

MATOPIBA or MAPITOBA is a clipped compound word that designates the region that extends across the territories of four Brazilian states: Maranhão, Tocantins, Piauí, and Bahia.

The region is made up of 31 micro-regions, covering roughly 73 million hectares. It includes 337 municipalities, with 324,326 agricultural establishments, 42 conservation units, 28 indigenous territories, 865 agrarian reform settlements, and 34 quilombola areas.

== See also ==
- North–South Railway (Brazil)
- Brazilian Highway System
- BR-135 (Brazil highway)
- BR-242 (Brazil highway)
- BR-020 (Brazil highway)
- Monoculture
- Agriculture in Brazil
- BR-235 (Brazil highway)
