= Cassurubá Extractive Reserve =

Extractive reserve in Bahia, Brazil

- Reserva Extrativista de Cassurubá
- IUCN category VI (protected area with sustainable use of natural resources)
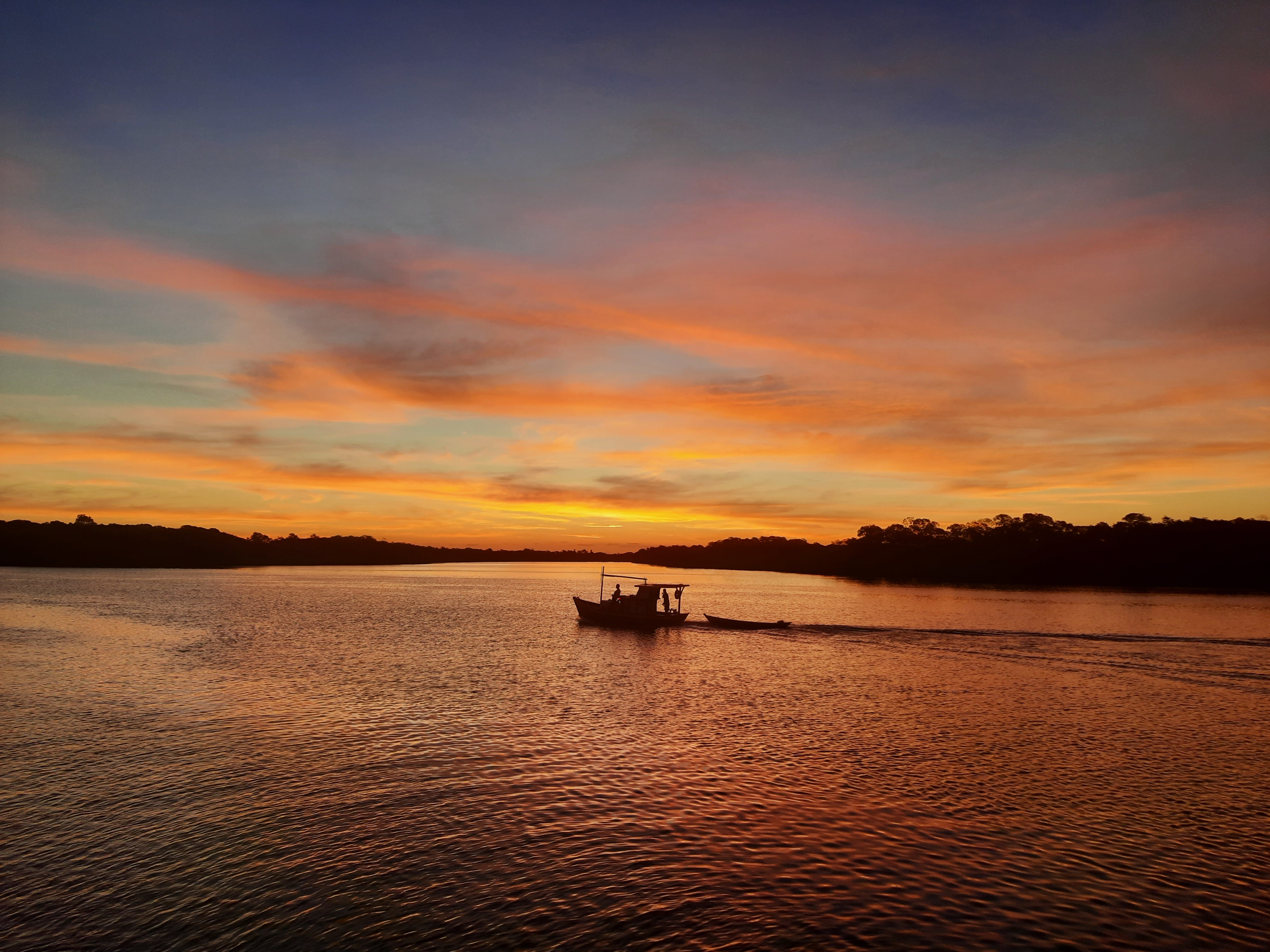
- Cassurubá Extractive Reserve in 2021

- Location within Brazil
- Nearest city: Caravelas, Bahia
- Coordinates: 17.807°S 39.282°W
- Area: 100,767.56 hectares (249,002.1 acres)
- Designation: Extractive reserve
- Created: 5 June 2009
- Administrator: Chico Mendes Institute for Biodiversity Conservation

The Cassurubá Extractive Reserve (Portuguese: Reserva Extrativista de Cassurubá) is an extractive reserve in the state of Bahia, Brazil.

== Location ==
The Cassurubá Extractive Reserve is in parts of the municipalities of Alcobaça, Caravelas and Nova Viçosa in the state of Bahia. It has an area of 100,767.56 hectares (249,002.1 acres) in the coastal marine biome. It covers the Caravelas River estuary and the coastal region to the north of the municipal seat of Nova Viçosa on the Atlantic coast of Bahia.

The region contains extensive mangroves, sandbank formations. remnants of Atlantic Forest and coastal marine environments that compose the Banco de Abrolhos, of great ecological importance in the South Atlantic region. The conservation unit is part of the surroundings of the Abrolhos National Park. The south coast of Bahia is an important area for breeding and nursing of humpback whales. The main pressures come from crab and shellfish pickers from outside the reserve, who use techniques that degrade the environment, and from tourist resorts and shrimp farms.

== History ==
Creation of the reserve was urged since 2005 by the people of Cassurubá to protect the livelihoods and culture of 300 families who collect shellfish there, including protection of the mangroves. The Cassurubá Extractive Reserve was created by presidential decree on 5 June 2009. It is administered by the Chico Mendes Institute for Biodiversity Conservation (ICMBio). It became part of the Central Atlantic Forest Ecological Corridor, created in 2002. It is classed as IUCN protected area category VI (protected area with sustainable use of natural resources). The purpose is to protect livelihoods and ensure conservation of renewable natural resources traditionally used by extractive population in the area.

== Sources ==
- Lamas, Ivana Reis; Crepaldi, Maria Otávia; Mesquita, Carlos Alberto Bernardo (2015), Uma Rede no Corredor (PDF) (in Portuguese), Conservação Internacional (CI-Brasil), ISBN 978-85-98830-28-5, archived from the original (PDF) on 2019-03-29
- Resex Cassurubá (in Portuguese), Chico Mendes Institute for Biodiversity Conservation
- Resex Cassurubá mapa interativo (in Portuguese), Chico Mendes Institute for Biodiversity Conservation
- RESEX do Cassurubá (in Portuguese), ISA: Instituto Ambiental
- Unidade de Conservação: Reserva Extrativista de Cassurubá (in Portuguese), MMA: Ministério do Meio Ambiente
