= Cayo Gorda =

Cay in Honduras

- Location within the Caribbean

Geography
- Location: Caribbean Sea
- Coordinates: 15°51′N 82°24′W
- Archipelago: Bay Islands
- Area: 3.1 km^{2} (1.2 sq mi)

Administration
- Honduras
- Department: Bay Islands

Demographics
- Population: 11 (2005)

Cayo Gorda is a cay that is 66 nautical miles off the east coast of Honduras in the Caribbean Sea. It has an approximate area of 0.007 square kilometres and in 2005 was inhabited by 11 people.

In 2001 the island was used as a reference point in the treaty that set the maritime boundary between Honduras and the Cayman Islands.
