= Placer (geography) =

Submerged bank or reef

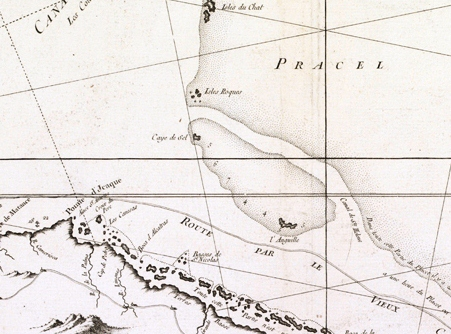
The Placer de los Roques marked as Pracel in a 1762 French map.

Placer (Portuguese: parcel or pracel) is a term used by Portuguese and Spanish navigators and cartographers to refer to a certain kind of submerged bank or reef. Commonly the bottom of such a reef is sandy, but there are some where the bottom is muddy or stoney. Although most reefs designated as placer are flat and shallow, exceptionally there are some that do not share those characteristics and are known as placer acantilado. A placer usually provides an anchorage for seagoing vessels.

== Etymology ==
The word placer derives from the Spanish placer, meaning shoal or alluvial/sand deposit, from plassa (place) from Medieval Latin placea (place) the origin word for "place" and "plaza" in English. The word in Spanish is thus derived from placea and refers directly to an alluvial or glacial deposit of sand or gravel.

Spanish navigator and explorer Pedro Sarmiento de Gamboa commented that placer likely originated as a term derived from placer mining in the Antilles, where pearl fishing was done mostly on shallow sandy reefs, which were compared to the sandy grounds in rivers where gold nuggets were found.

Since the word Placer in Spanish means 'pleasure', according to 16th century scientist Juan Pérez de Moya a placer is every dangerous submerged shallow bank. Moya claims that the landforms that received this denomination did so in an ironical manner, for it would be everything but a pleasure to navigate those treacherous waters under the constant risk of running aground. However, other navigators contradict Moya by claiming that such a shallow ground would provide mariners with a much welcome anchorage after a long open sea journey, for in some placeres the waters are not as rough as in the open seas.

== Use of the term ==
The term appears in Spanish nautical charts as placer, although Pedro Sarmiento de Gamboa writes it as placel. The Portuguese language equivalent and derived term is pracel or parcel. In present times some of the geographical names used by the Spanish cartographers, such as Placer de los Colorados, Placer de los Estudios, Placer de Playa Grande, Placer de Montechristi, Placer de Quatro Cayos, Placer de la Gallega, Placer de las Tortugas and Placer de los Siete Hermanos have become obsolete or have been superseded by English terms. Still, many other placeres mentioned in 19th-century Spanish Navigation Instruction Manuals were not even named. Not all placeres are in the open sea; the Isla Cangrejos in the Orinoco Delta was described as having a placer that stretched from its NE point composed of ground-coffee coloured hard sand.

- Paracel Islands. Portuguese navigators whose vessels frequented the South China Sea as early as at the beginning of the 16th century, were the first to refer to the Paracel Islands as Ilhas do Pracel. French explorers and cartographers used the Portuguese terms Pracel or Parcel. In the "Map of the coast of Tonquin and Cochinchina", made in 1747 by Pierre d'Hondt, the dangerous cluster of reefs of the Ilhas do Pracel was labeled "Le Paracel".
- Parcel dos Abrolhos and Parcel das Paredes, in the Abrolhos Archipelago area off the Brazilian coast in the Atlantic Ocean.
- Placer de los Roques, also known as Cay Sal Bank.
- Placer de la Serranilla, historical name of the Serranilla Bank.
- Placer de la Víbora, former name of Pedro Bank.
- Placer de Rosalinda, Spanish name of Rosalind Bank.
- Placer de la Misteriosa, Spanish name of Misteriosa Bank.
- Placer de la Guaira, Spanish name of La Guaira Bank.
- Placer de los Caicos, Spanish name of the Caicos Bank.
- Placer de las Bóvedas, in the Mediterranean Sea east of Estepona, a good fishing and scuba diving site.

=== Cartography ===
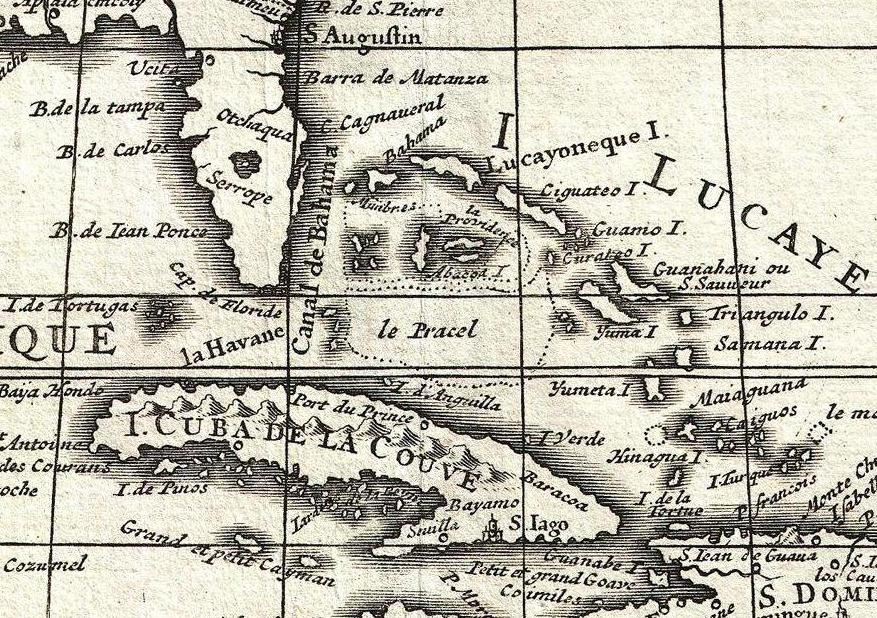
"Le Pracel" north of Cuba in a 1708 De L'Isle map

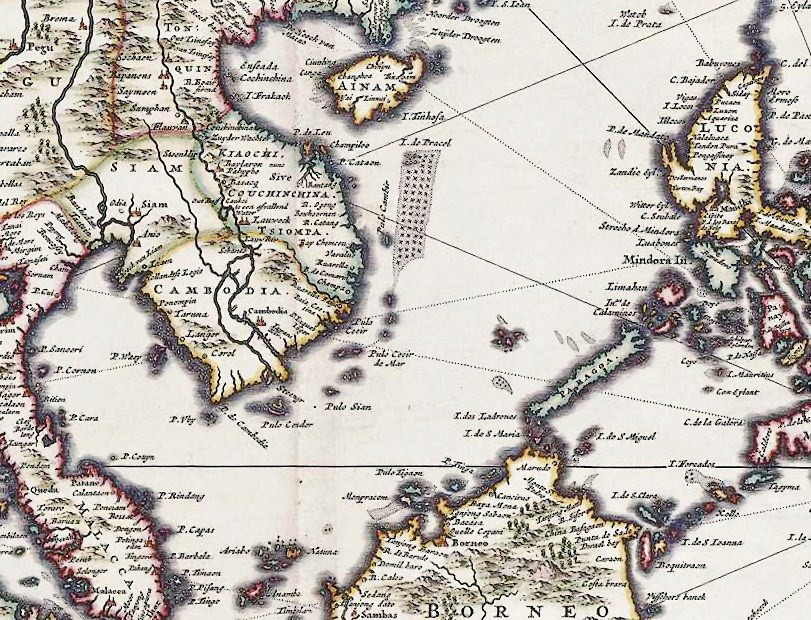
"I. de Pracel" south of Hainan in a 16th-century Nicolaes Visscher II map

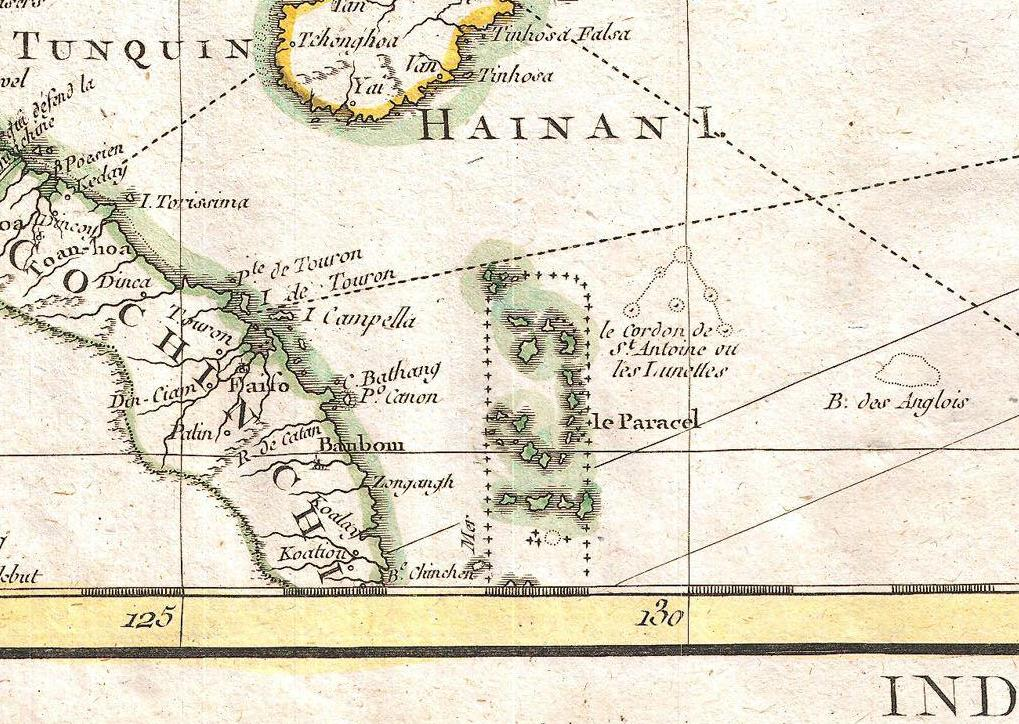
"Le Paracel" off the coast of Vietnam in a 1771 Rigobert Bonne Map of Tonkin, China, Formosa and Luzon

== See also ==
- Ocean bank
- Reef
