= Abrolhos Marine National Park =

National park in Bahia, Brazil

- Parque Nacional Marinho dos Abrolhos
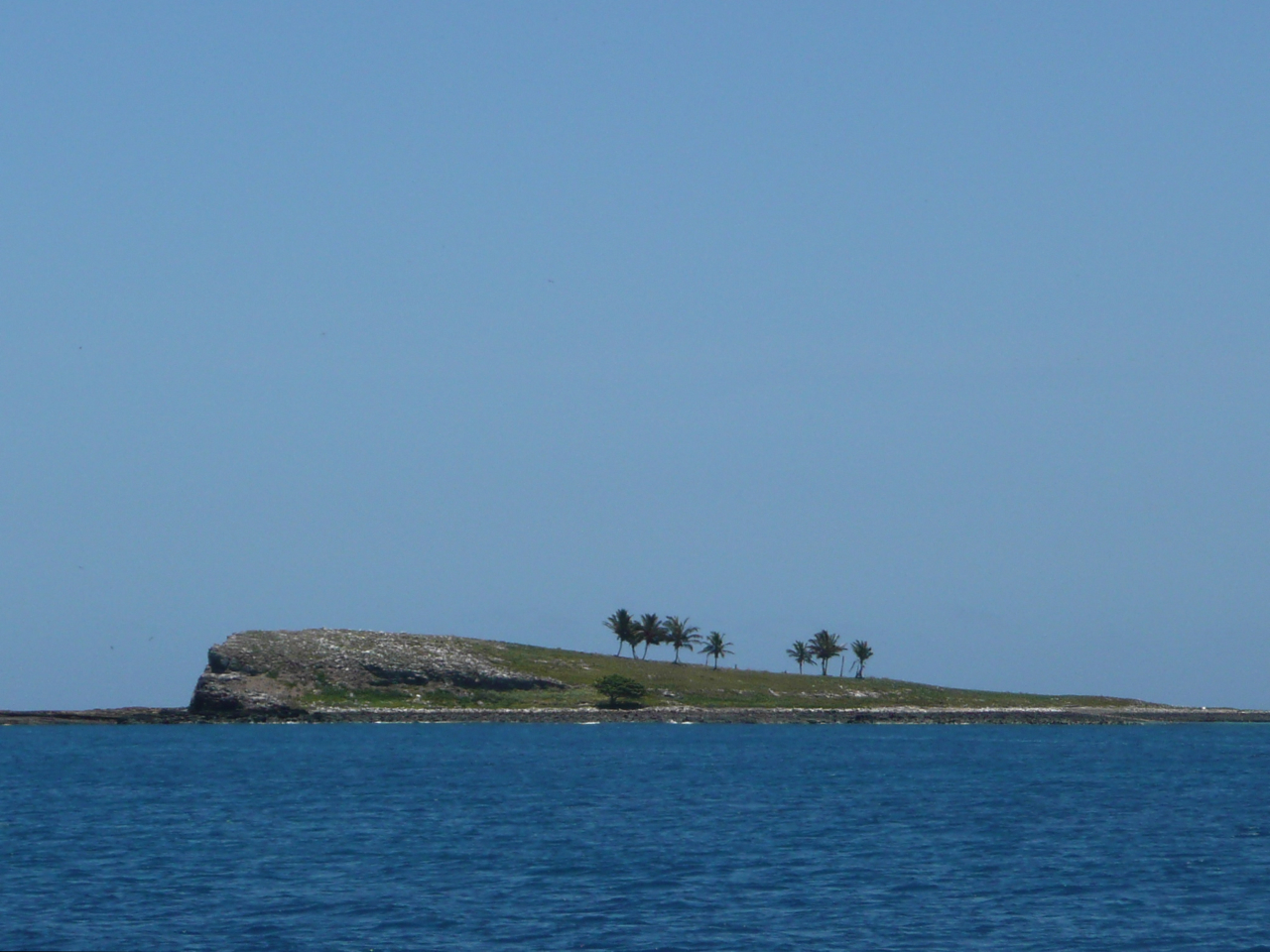
- One of the islands of the Abrolhos Archipelago

- Location within Brazil
- Coordinates: 17.971°S 38.700°W
- Designation: National park
- Created: 6 April 1983

Ramsar Wetland
- Designated: 2 February 2010
- Reference no.: 1902

The Abrolhos Marine National Park (Portuguese: Parque Nacional Marinho dos Abrolhos [ˈpaʁki nasi.oˈnaw maˈɾĩɲu duz ɐˈbɾɔʎus, - nasjoˈnaw -]) is a national park that was established in 1983 covering most of the Abrolhos Archipelago area in the state of Bahia, Brazil.

== Location ==
The park was established on 6 April 1983, and covers about 91,300 hectares (226,000 acres). It became part of the Central Atlantic Forest Ecological Corridor, created in 2002. It is located off the southern coast of Bahia in the northeast of Brazil. The islands are volcanic in origin.

There are five islands in the Abrolhos archipelago but only one of them, Siriba, is open to visitors. A 1,600 metres (5,200 ft) trail runs around the island. Ilha Santa Bárbara is outside the park boundary. It is under the jurisdiction of the navy, which maintains a navigation beacon there. The other islands are Ilha Guarita, Ilha Redonda, and Ilha Sueste. The park also includes the Parcel dos Abrolhos, which has typical coral formations of the region, aa well as the Timbebas reef opposite the city of Alcobaça.

== Ecology ==
The waters are clear and there is great diversity of underwater flora and fauna, including flourishing coral formations. The island vegetation is mainly low, small plants such as grasses and herbs. Seabirds include the white bellied booby, terns, frigates, jays and woodpeckers. Charles Darwin visited the archipelago in 1830 and was impressed by the variety of species, including birds, lizards and spiders.

Ilha Guarita and Ilha Sueste are home to many seabirds. Frigate birds nest on the steep sides of Ilha Redonda, which is visited by loggerhead turtles for spawning in the summer. Diving along the reefs and the Rosalinda shipwreck is allowed, and humpback whales may be observed from boats. Since 2003 the park has been an outpost of the Atlantic Forest Biosphere Reserve (RBMA: Reserva de Biosfera da Mata Atlântica). In 2010 it was recognized as a Ramsar Site.

Conservation International Brazil developed a 2023–2025 initiative in the Abrolhos seascape aimed at strengthening protected-area management and supporting sustainable tourism around Abrolhos Marine National Park and the Cassurubá Extractive Reserve.

== Sources ==
- Lamas, Ivana Reis; Crepaldi, Maria Otávia; Mesquita, Carlos Alberto Bernardo (2015), Uma Rede no Corredor (PDF) (in Portuguese), Conservação Internacional (CI-Brasil), ISBN 978-85-98830-28-5, archived from the original (PDF) on 29 March 2019
- "Parque Nacional Marinho dos Abrolhos", Abrolhos.net (in Portuguese)
- Parque Nacional Marinho dos Abrolhos (in Portuguese), ICMBio, archived from the original on 30 September 2020
- "The Marine National Park of Abrolhos", ilhasdeabrolhos.com.br, archived from the original on 6 April 2016
