= Abrolhos Archipelago =

Group of islands off the central Brazilian coast

Native name: Arquipélago de Abrolhos
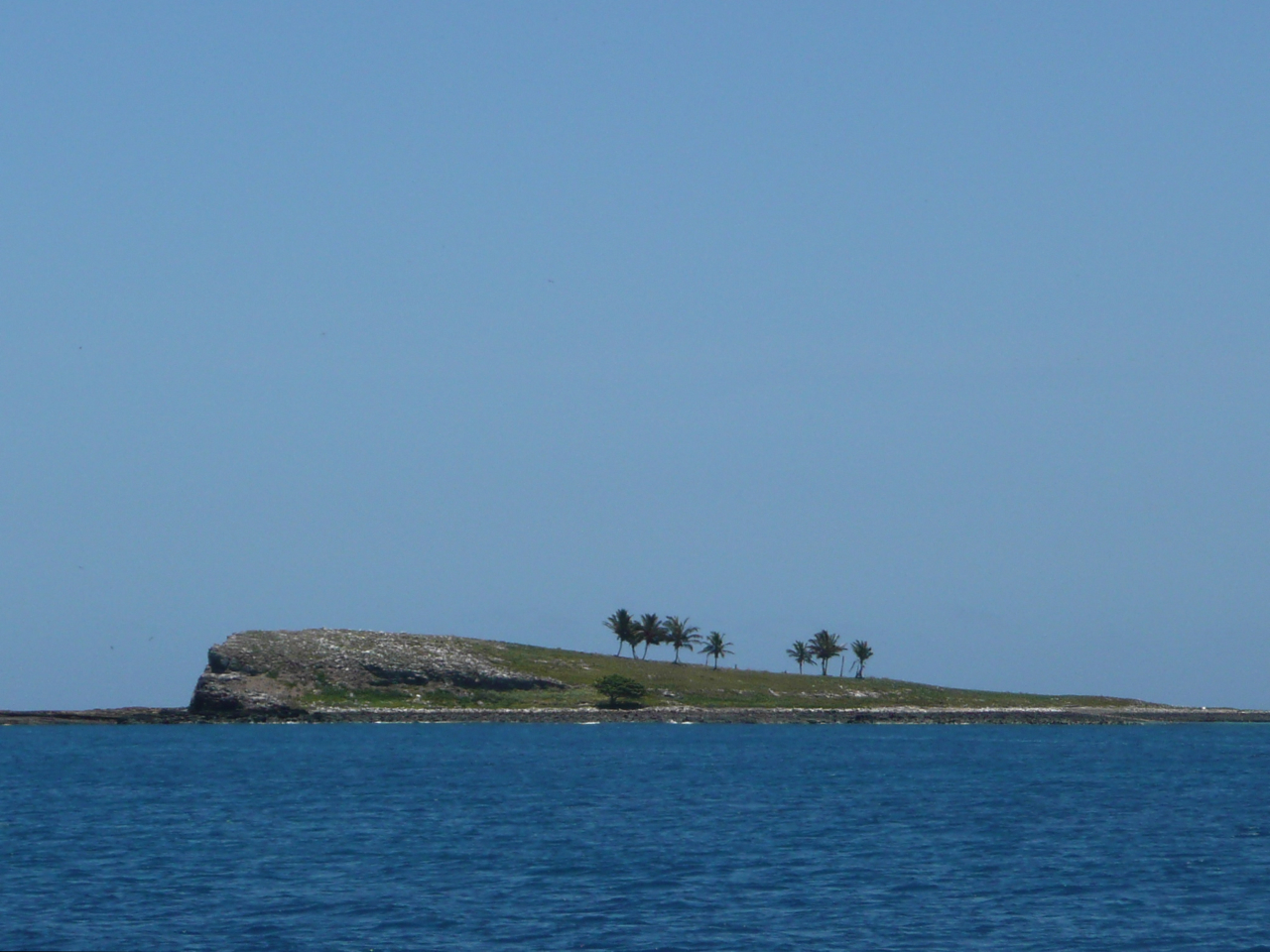
- Siriba Island

- Location within Brazil Location within Atlantic Ocean

Geography
- Location: Atlantic Ocean
- Coordinates: 17°57′46.6″S 38°42′12.3″W
- Archipelago: Arquipélago de Abrolhos
- Total islands: 5
- Major islands: Santa Bárbara
- Area: 50.0 km^{2} (19.3 sq mi)

Administration
- Brazil
- Region: Northeast
- State: Bahia
- Administration: 1st Naval District of the Brazilian Navy

Demographics
- Population: uninhabited

Additional information
- Official website: Abrolhos website
- Abrolhos Lighthouse
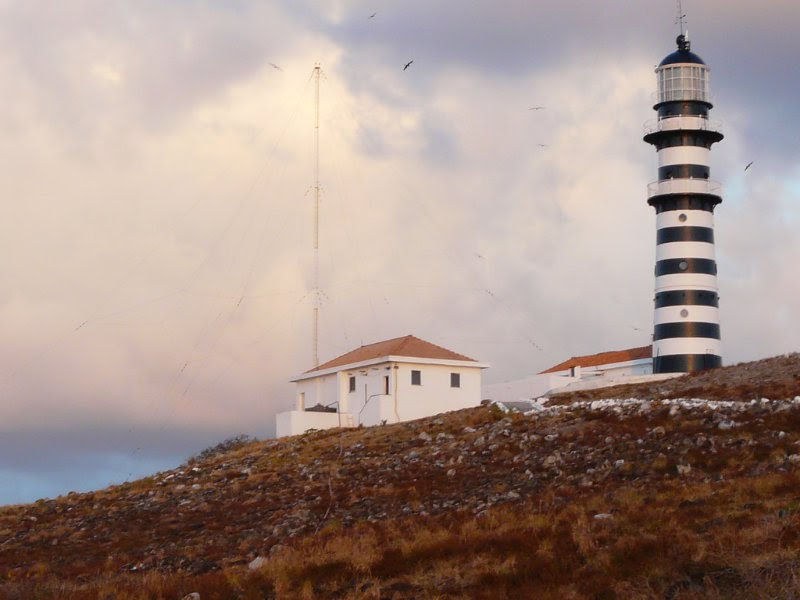
- Coordinates: 17°57′53″S 38°41′39″W
- Constructed: 1861
- Foundation: concrete base
- Construction: cast iron tower
- Height: 22 feet (6.7 m)
- Shape: cylindrical tower with double balcony and lantern
- Markings: white and black horizontal bands tower
- Racon: Q
- Focal height: 60 metres (200 ft)
- Lens: two meso-radial lenses
- Range: 51 nautical miles (94 km; 59 mi)
- Characteristic: Fl W 6s.
- Brazil no.: BR-1848

The Abrolhos Archipelago (Portuguese: Arquipélago de Abrolhos) are a group of 5 small islands with coral reefs off the southern coast of Bahia state in the northeast of Brazil, between 17º25’—18º09’ S and 38º33’—39º05’ W. Caravelas is the nearest town. Their name comes from the Portuguese: abrolho ("Abre Olhos" meaning: Open your eyes), a rock awash or submerged sandbank that is a danger to ships. There is a conspicuous shipwreck in the group, SS Rosalinda.

== History ==
These islets were surveyed by Baron Roussin. As part of the instructions for the second survey voyage of HMS Beagle, the Admiralty noted "the great importance of knowing the true position of the Abrolhos Banks, and the certainty that they extend much further out than the limits assigned to them by Baron Roussin", and asked Captain Robert FitzRoy to take soundings and establish the position of the reefs. The work was carried out from 27 to 30 March 1832, giving Charles Darwin the opportunity to examine the wildlife and geology of the islands.

Known to the Royal Navy in the First World War as the Abrolhos Rocks, the area was used as a refuelling point (coal) during Doveton Sturdee's operations against the German cruisers of Admiral Von Spee in late 1914. This operation ended with the Battle of the Falklands and the subsequent sinking of the only survivor, SMS Dresden.

== Features ==
=== Islands ===
- Ilha de Santa Bárbara, the largest island. There is a Brazilian Navy military outpost and a lighthouse.
- Ilha Siriba, the only island open to visitors
- Ilha Redonda
- Ilha Guarita
- Ilha Sueste

=== Submerged banks ===
- Parcel dos Abrolhos, a large submerged reef extending from north to south east of the archipelago. Located 5 kilometres (3.1 miles) to the east of Santa Barbara Island, its limits are not well defined.
- Parcel das Paredes, located to the northwest of the archipelago and the largest feature of the wider Abrolhos.
- Sebastiao Gomes Reef, Coroa Vermelha Reef and Viçosa Reef, located to the southwest of the Parcel das Paredes.
- Timbebas Reef, located to the north near the coast.

== Wildlife ==
The extensive reefs of the island group are an area of rich marine fauna. The uninhabited islets are a breeding ground for pelagic birds.

The Abrolhos Marine National Park (Portuguese: Parque Nacional Marinho dos Abrolhos) is a Marine Park located in the Abrolhos Archipelago since 1983. It is strictly forbidden to disembark on Ilha Guarita and Ilha Suest.

== Gallery ==
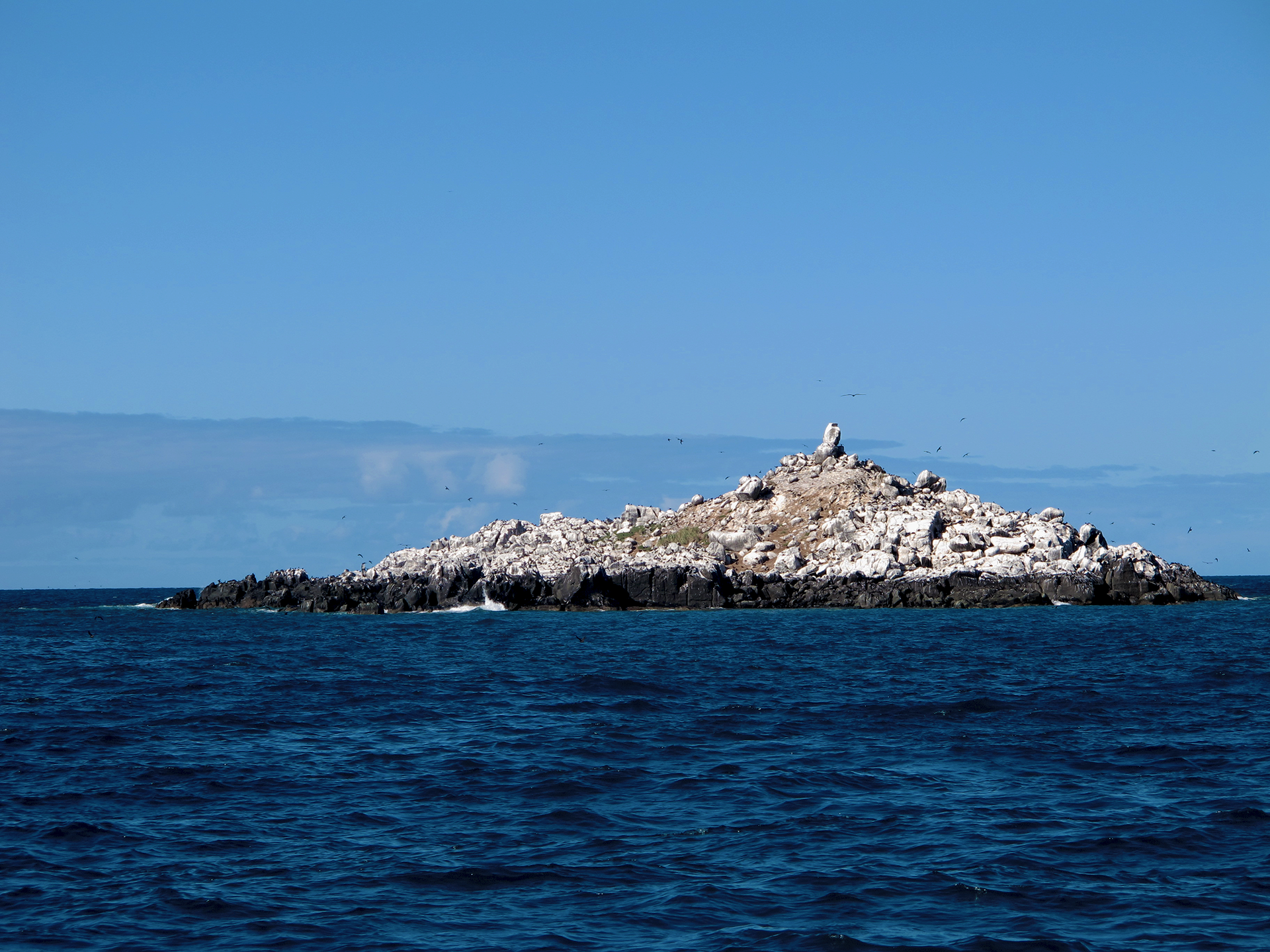
View of Ilha de Santa Barbara.

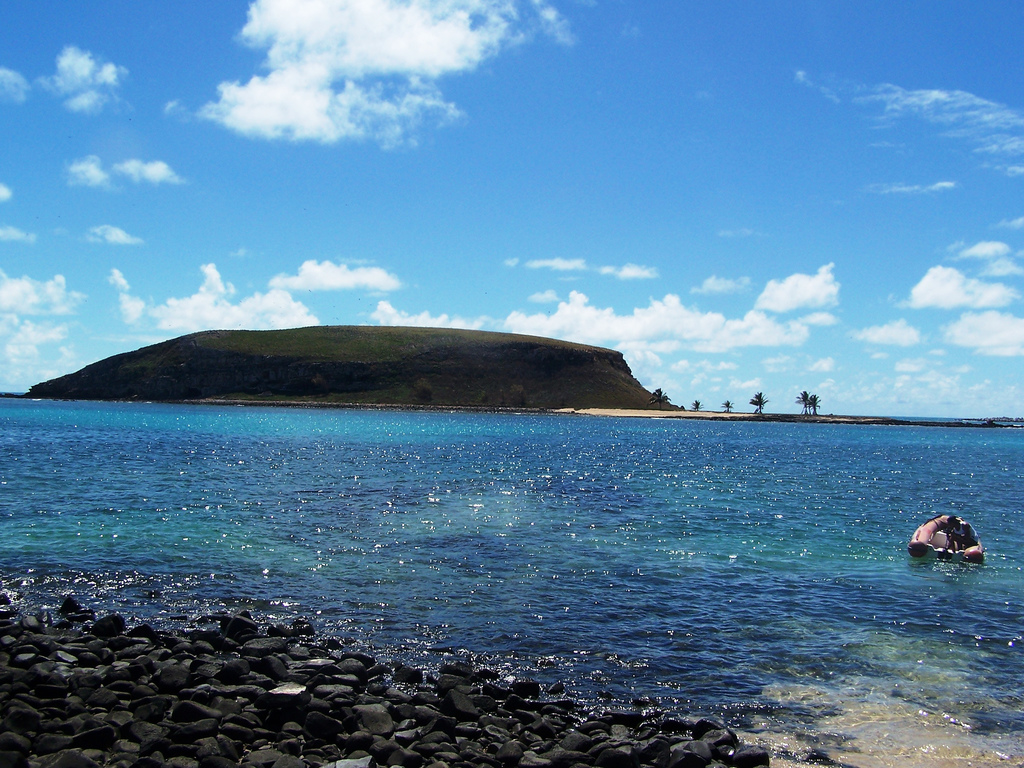
View of Ilha Redonda in the Abrolhos Archipelago.

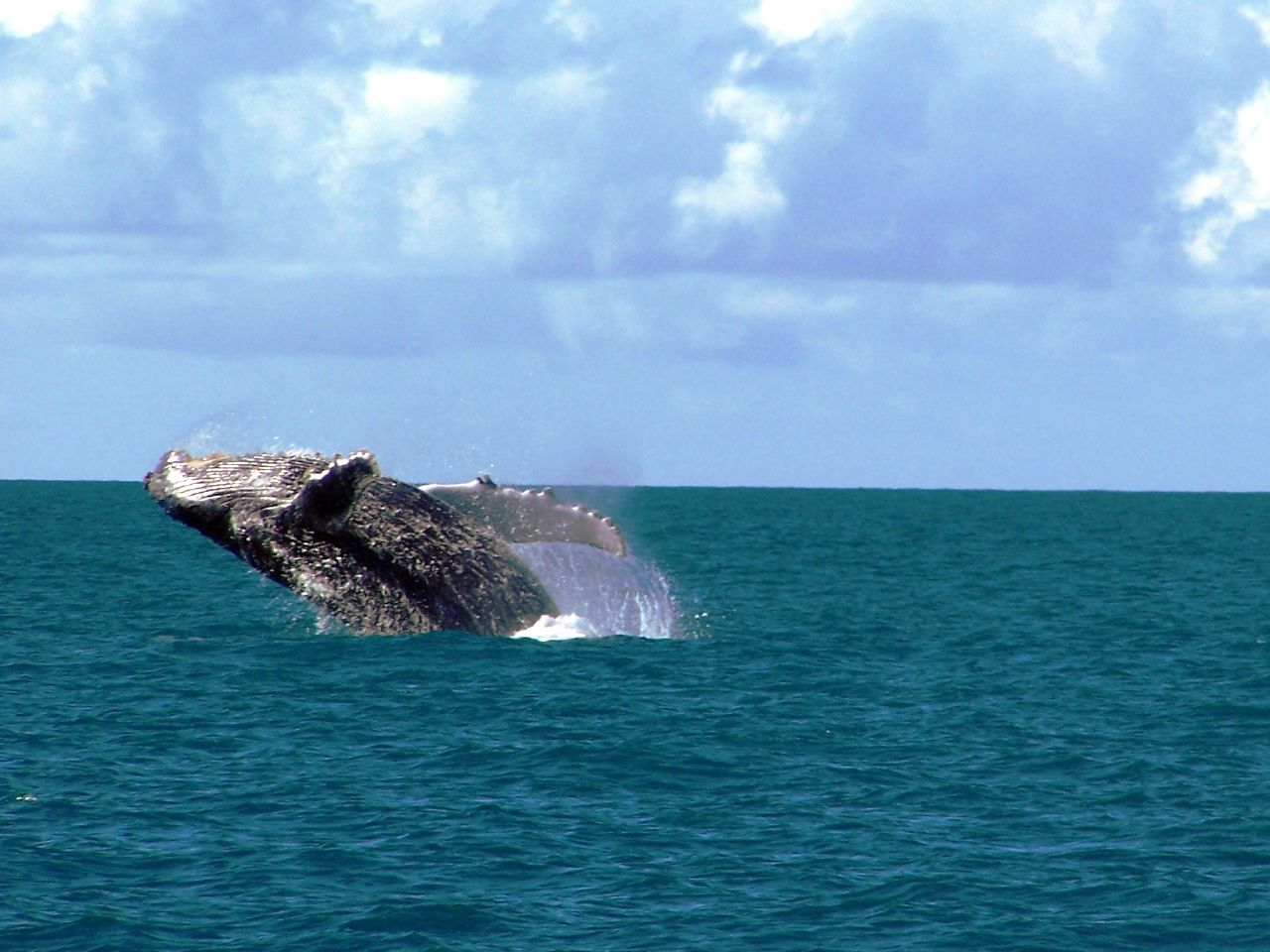
A humpback whale in the waters of the Abrolhos area.

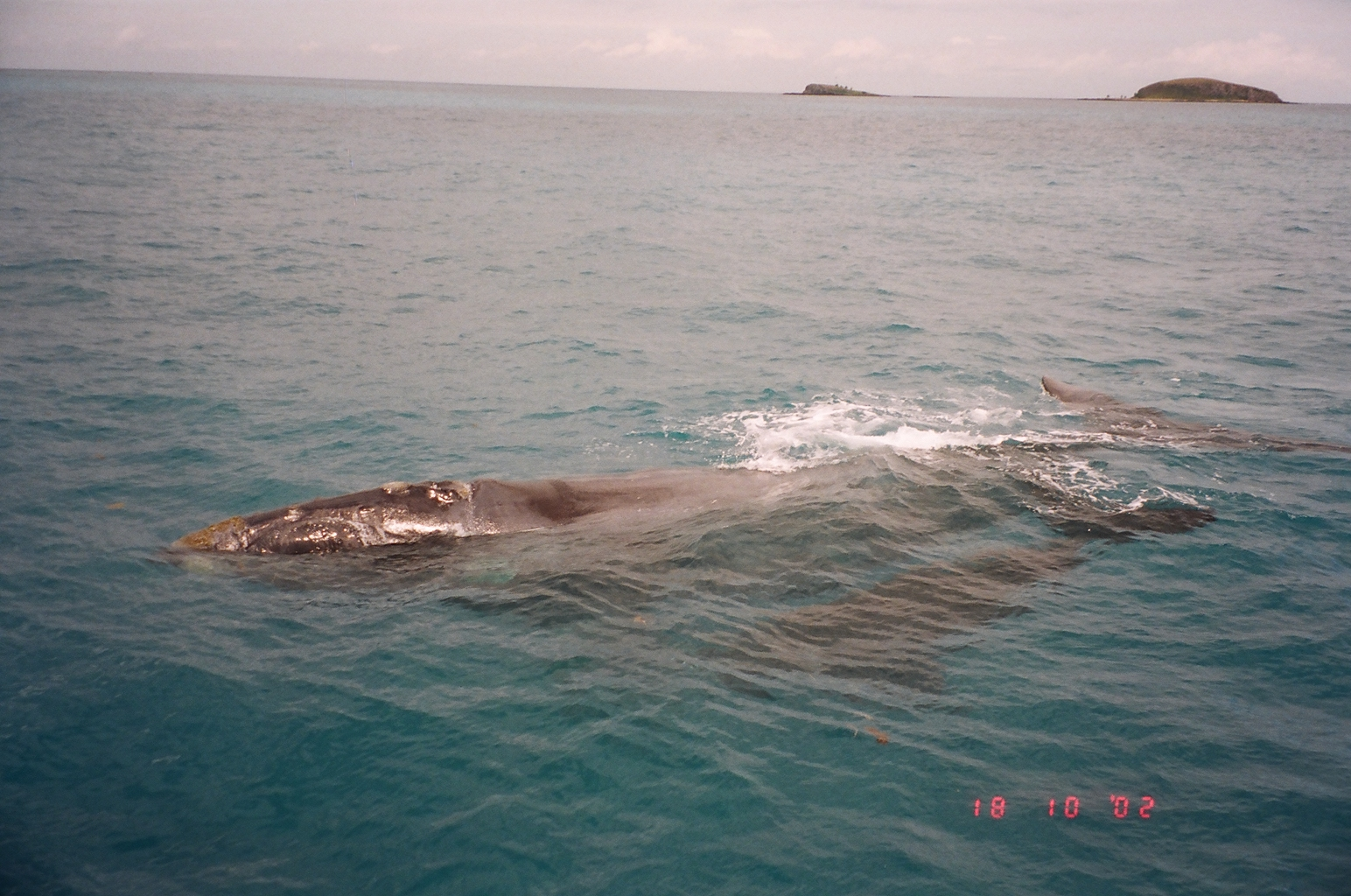
Southern right whales are recovering and visiting Abrolhos in small numbers.

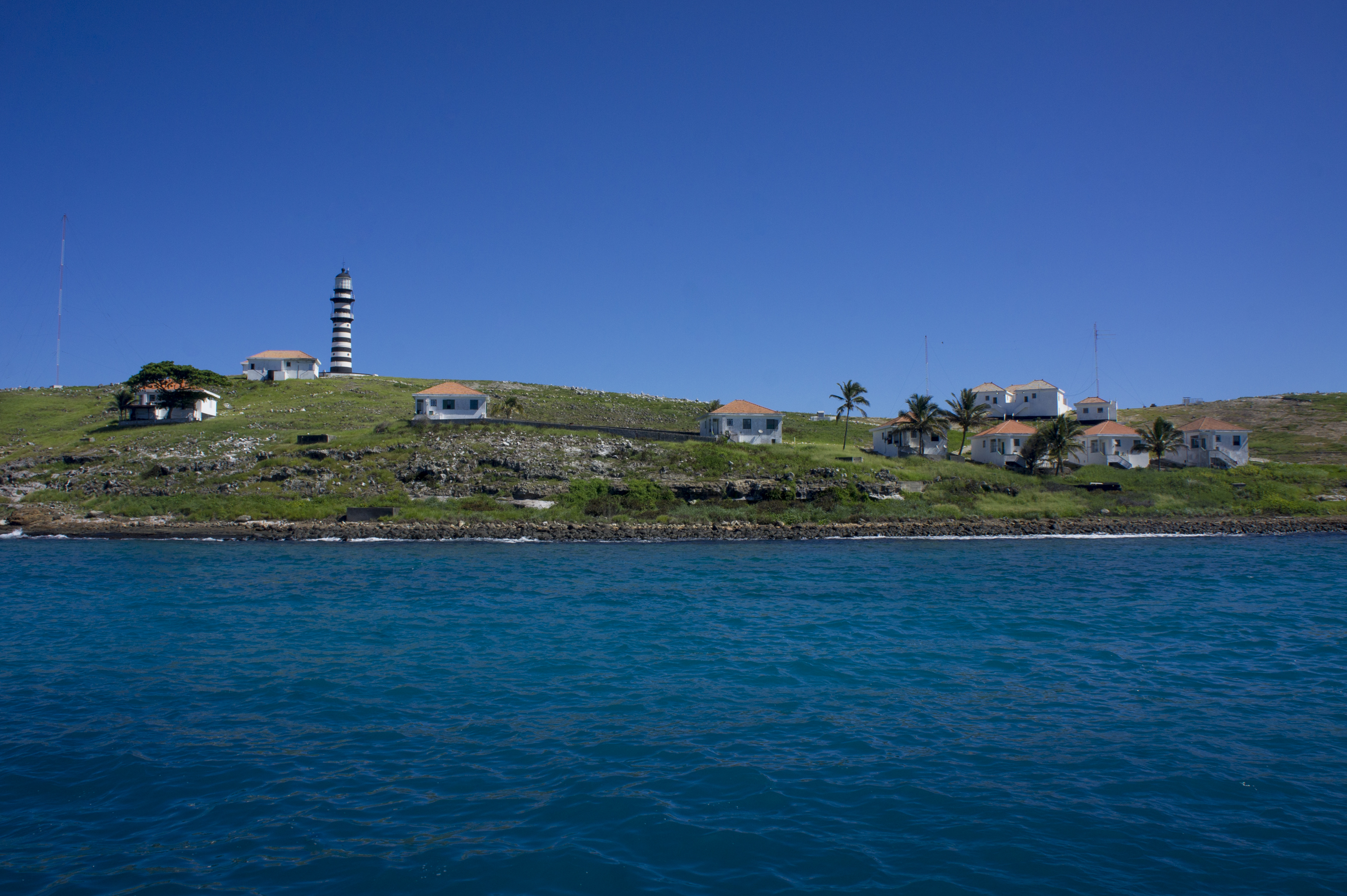
Santa Barbara Island, military area.

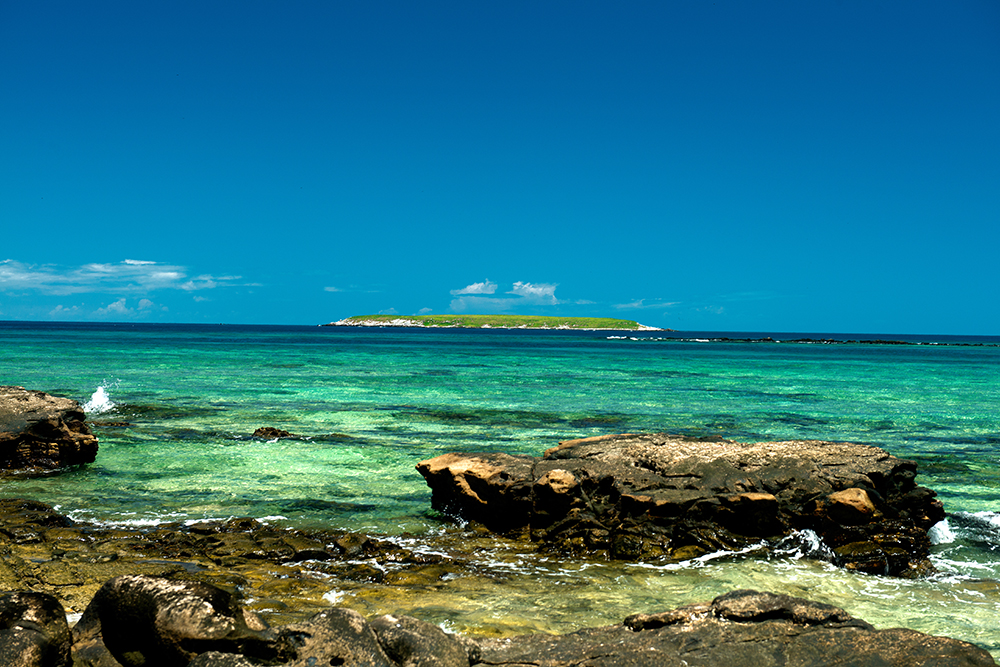
Sueste Island View.

== See also ==
- List of lighthouses in Brazil
- Placer (geography)
