= Dive computer =

Instrument to calculate decompression status in real time

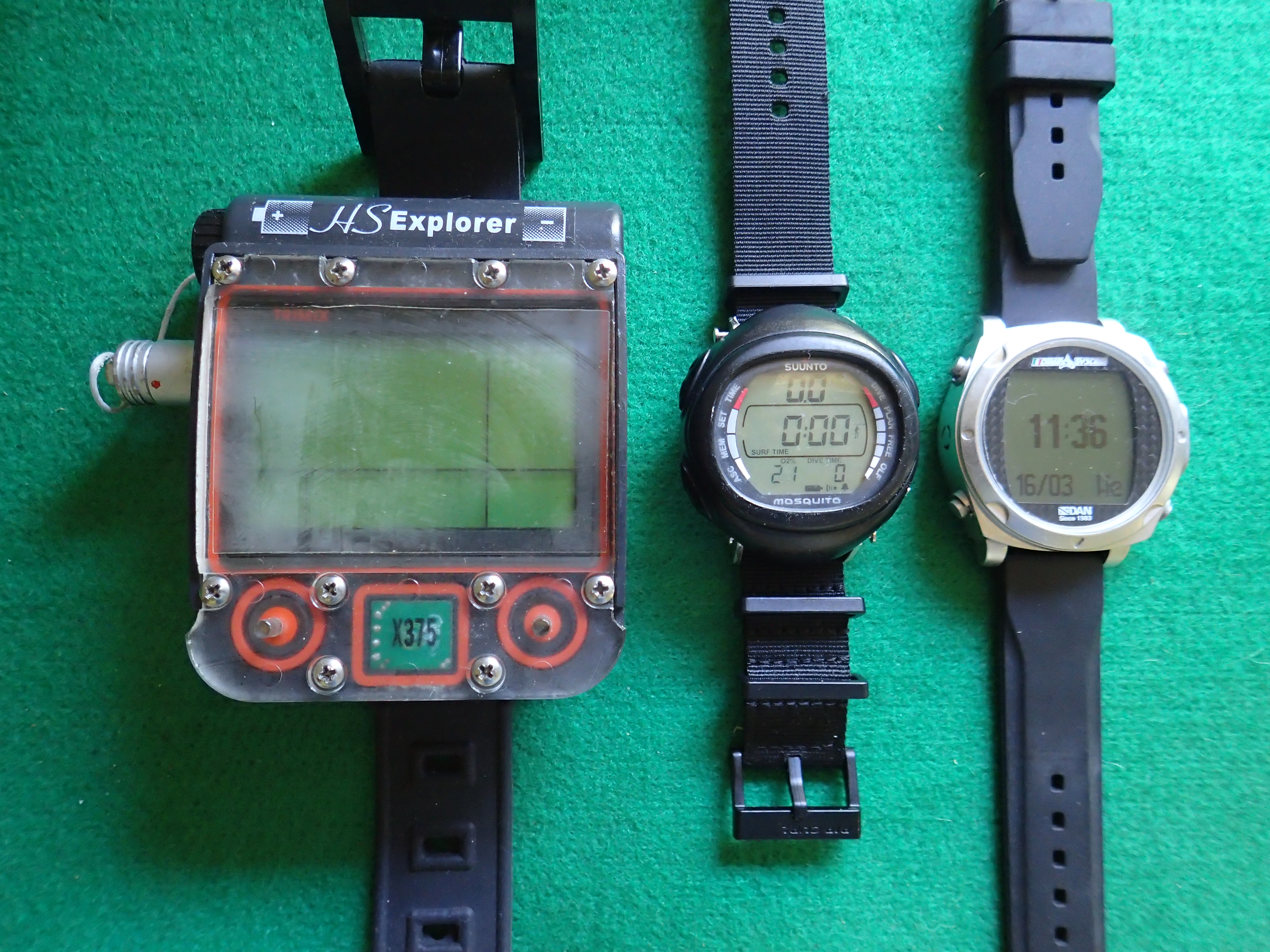
- Hydrospace Explorer Trimix and rebreather dive computer. Suunto Mosquito with aftermarket strap and iDive DAN recreational dive computers
- Other names: Personal dive computer
- Uses: Dive profile recording and real-time decompression information

A dive computer, personal decompression computer or decompression meter is a device used by an underwater diver to measure the elapsed time and depth during a dive and use this data to calculate and display an ascent profile which, according to the programmed decompression algorithm, will give a low risk of decompression sickness. A secondary function is to record the dive profile, warn the diver when certain events occur, and provide useful information about the environment. Dive computers are a development from decompression tables, the diver's watch and depth gauge, with greater accuracy and the ability to monitor dive profile data in real time.

Most dive computers use real-time ambient pressure input to a decompression algorithm to indicate the remaining time to the no-stop limit, and after that has passed, the minimum decompression required to surface with an acceptable risk of decompression sickness. Several algorithms have been used, and various personal conservatism factors may be available. Some dive computers allow for gas switching during the dive, and some monitor the pressure remaining in the scuba cylinders. Audible alarms may be available to warn the diver when exceeding the no-stop limit, the maximum operating depth for the breathing gas mixture, the recommended ascent rate, decompression ceiling, or other limit beyond which risk increases significantly.

The display provides data to allow the diver to avoid obligatory decompression stops, or to decompress relatively safely, and includes depth and duration of the dive. This must be displayed clearly, legibly, and unambiguously at all light levels. Several additional functions and displays may be available for interest and convenience, such as water temperature and compass direction, and it may be possible to download the data from the dives to a personal computer via cable or wireless connection. Data recorded by a dive computer may be of great value to the investigators in a diving accident, and may allow the cause of an accident to be discovered. Profile information may also be useful to help decide a suitable treatment for an injured diver, so the computer should accompany the injured diver to the treatment facility.

Dive computers may be wrist-mounted or fitted to a console with the submersible pressure gauge. A dive computer is perceived by recreational scuba divers and service providers to be one of the most important items of safety equipment. It is one of the most expensive pieces of diving equipment owned by most divers. Use by professional scuba divers is also common, but use by surface-supplied divers is less widespread, as the diver's depth is monitored at the surface by pneumofathometer and decompression is controlled by the diving supervisor. Some freedivers use another type of dive computer to record their dive profiles and give them useful information which can make their dives safer and more efficient, and some computers can provide both functions, but require the user to select which function is required.

== Purpose ==
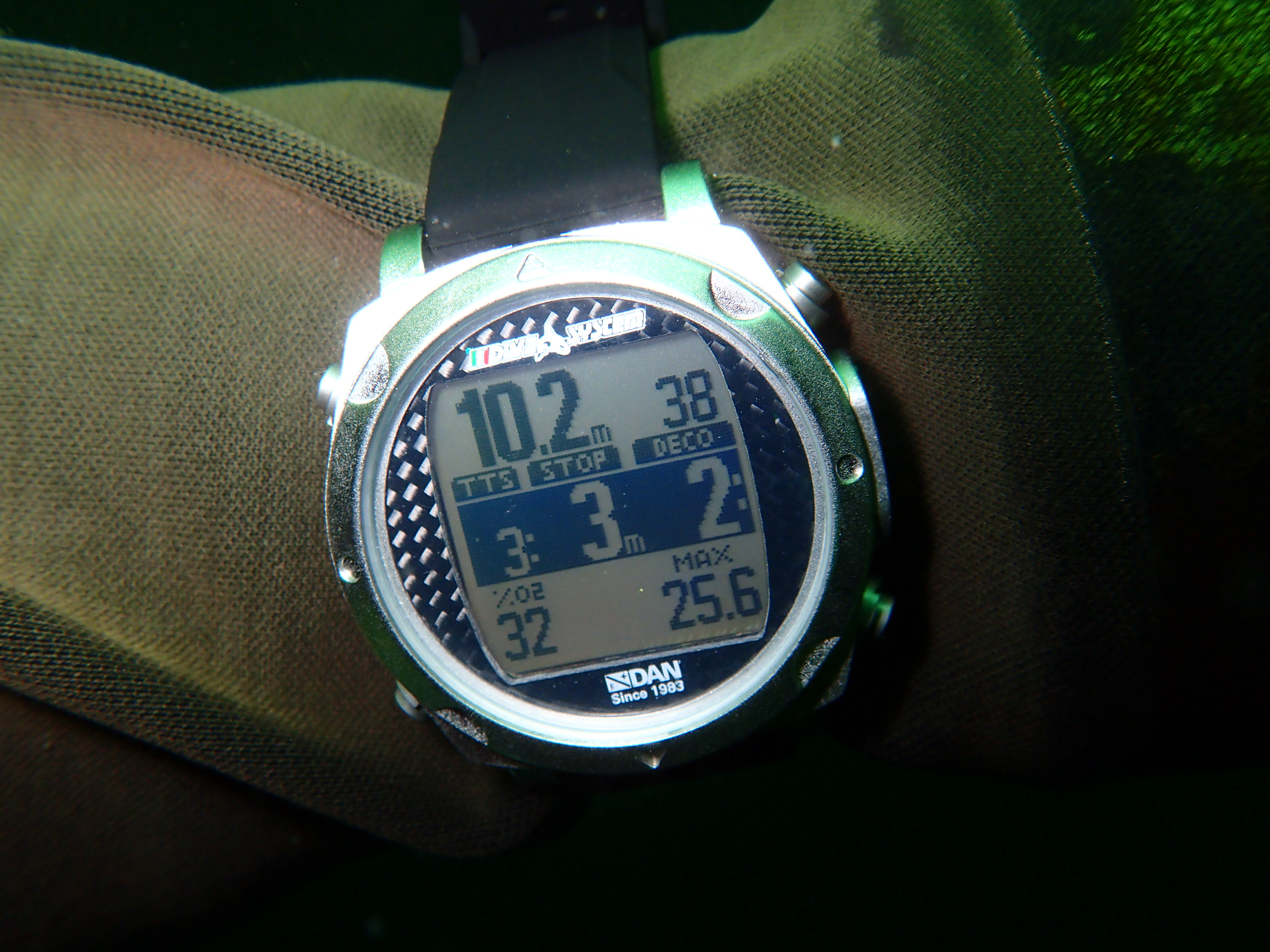
iDive DAN personal dive computer display showing decompression requirement and other data during a dive The central band shows time to surface from current depth, stop depth and stop time.

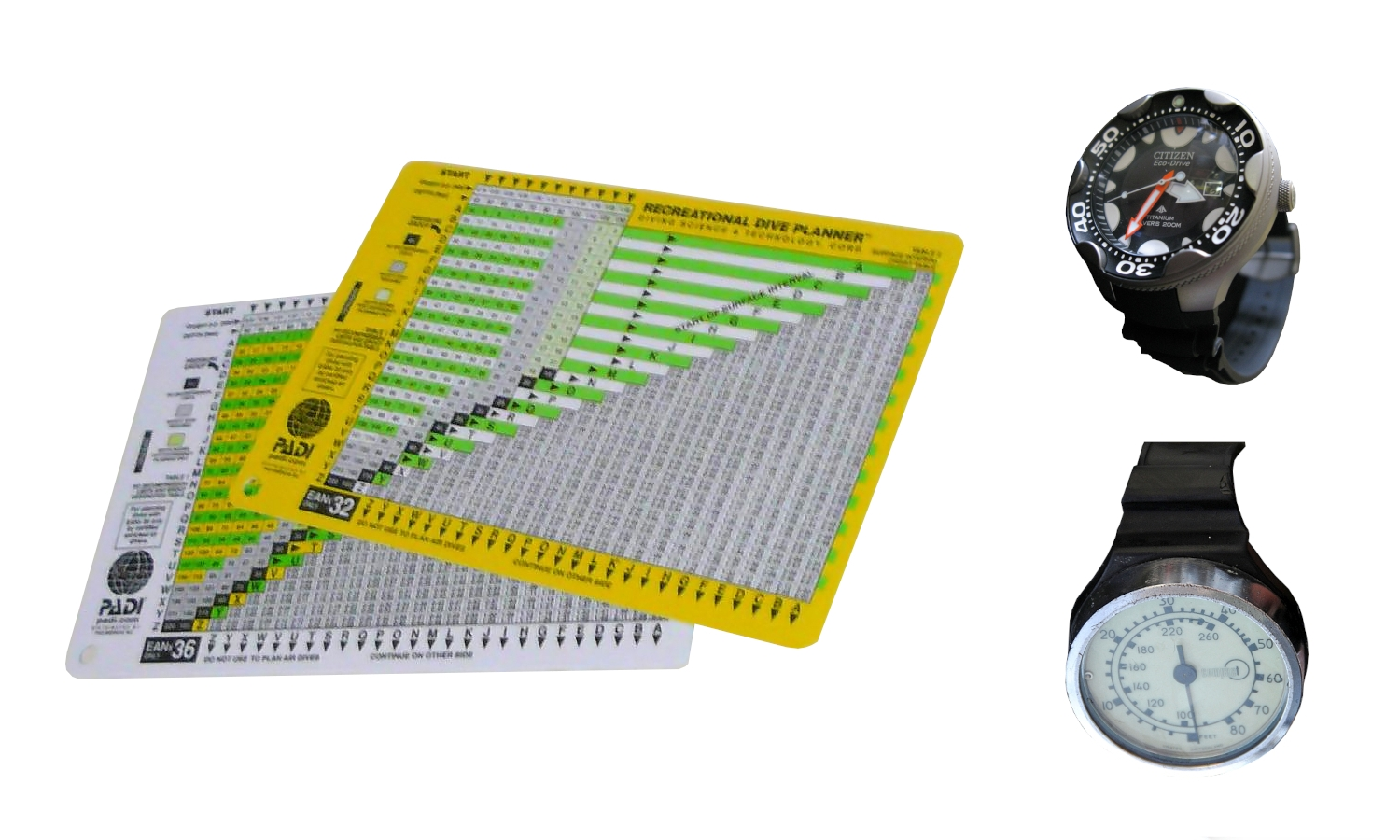
The dive computer eliminated the previously mandatory interconnected use of three pieces of equipment: diving watch (top right), depth gauge (bottom right) and waterproof decompression table (left).

The primary purpose of a decompression computer is to facilitate safe decompression by an underwater diver breathing a suitable gas at ambient pressure, by providing information based on the recent pressure exposure history of the diver that allows an ascent with acceptably low risk of developing decompression sickness. Dive computers address the same problem as decompression tables, but are able to perform a continuous calculation of the theoretical partial pressure of inert gases in the body based on the actual depth and time profile of the diver and the decompression model used by the computer. As the dive computer automatically measures depth and time, it is able to warn of excessive ascent rates and missed decompression stops and the diver has less reason to carry a separate dive watch and depth gauge. Many dive computers also provide additional information to the diver including ambient temperature, partial pressure of oxygen in the breathing gas at ambient pressure, accumulated oxygen toxicity exposure data, a computer-readable dive log, and the pressure of the remaining breathing gas in the diving cylinder. This recorded information can be used for the diver's personal log of their activities or as important information in medical review or legal cases following diving accidents. The exposure record may also help guide decisions on appropriate treatment for an injured diver, if it is made available to the relevant medical personnel.

Because of the computer's ability to continually re-calculate based on changing data, the diver benefits by being able to remain underwater for longer periods at acceptable risk. For example, a recreational diver who plans to stay within "no-decompression stop" limits can in many cases simply ascend a few feet each minute, while continuing the dive, and still remain within reasonably safe limits, rather than adhering to a pre-planned bottom time and then ascending directly. Multi-level dives can be pre-planned with traditional dive tables or personal computer and smartphone apps, or on the fly using waterproof dive tables, but the additional calculations become complex, and the plan may be cumbersome to follow, and the risk of errors rises with profile complexity. Computers allow for a certain amount of spontaneity during the dive, and automatically take into account deviations from the dive plan.

Dive computers are used to safely calculate decompression schedules in recreational, scientific, and military diving operations. There is no reason to assume that they cannot be valuable tools for commercial diving operations, especially on multi-level dives.

== Components ==
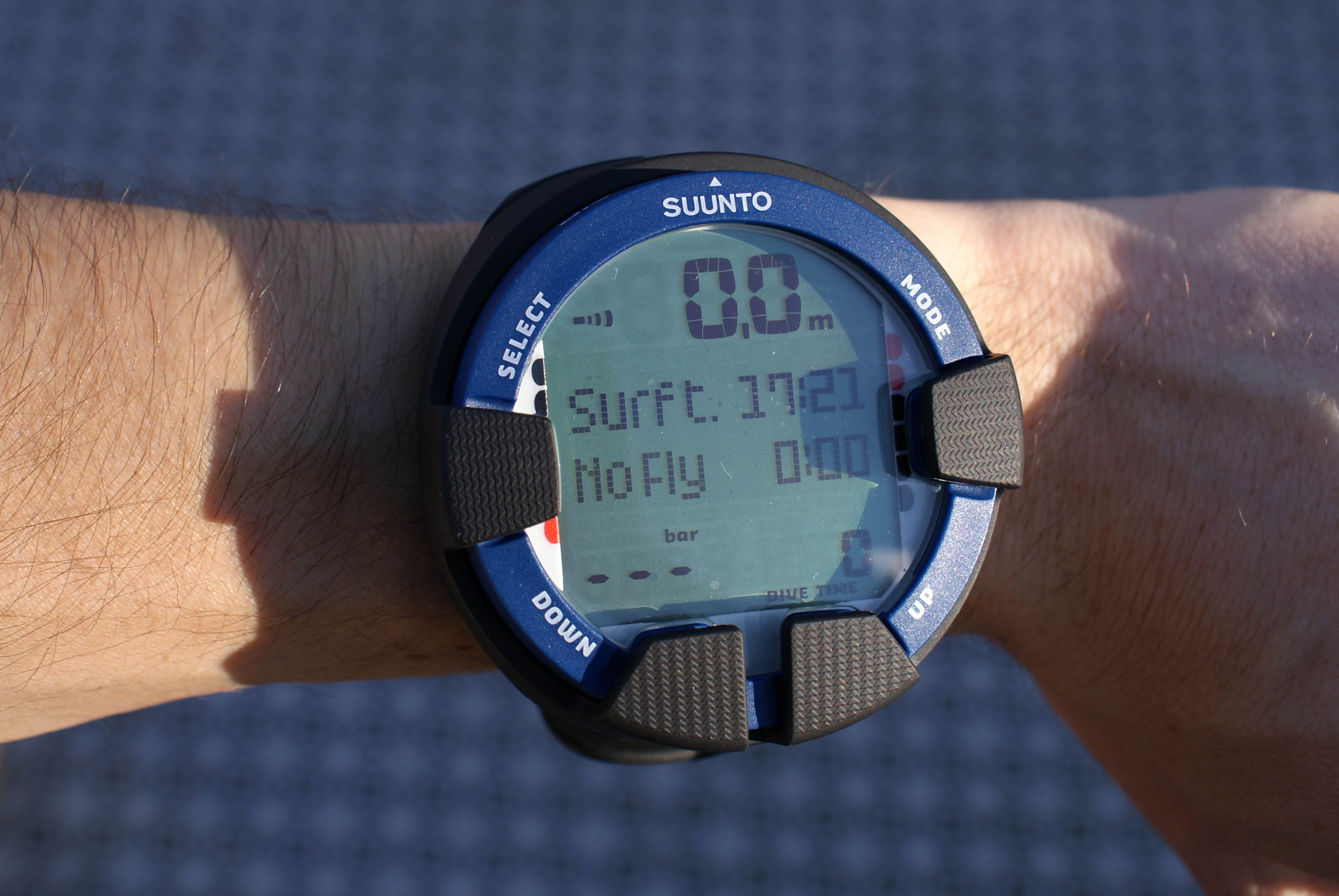
A dive computer incorporating Nitrox functions (Suunto Vyper Air)

Some components are common to all models of dive computer as they are essential to the basic function. Some have more than one commonly accepted name:

ambient pressure transducer
pressure sensor

Component that converts ambient pressure to an electrical signal Piezoresistive pressure sensors are frequently used for this purpose.
analog-to-digital converter

Component that converts the voltage output from the pressure transducer to a binary signal that can be processed by the computer.
buttons
User input interface in the form of push-buttons or external contacts which accept manual input from the user to set the user preferences and select display options.
clock
Circuitry that synchronises the steps of the processor and keeps track of elapsed time. It may also keep track of time of day.
display

Screen to present the results of computation to the diver in real time.
faceplate
The transparent glass or plastic window covering the display screen. Tempered glass and synthetic sapphire are most scratch resistant, but brittle, and can fracture on impact, causing the housing to leak, which can destroy the electronics. These materials are popular on wristwatch style units, which are expected to be worn out of the water. The larger units are more likely to be worn only while diving, and the more impact resistant polycarbonate faceplates used for these computers are more sensitive to scratching, but are less likely to flood. Disposable transparent self-adhesive faceplate protectors are available for some models.
housing
case
The waterproof container in which the other components are installed to protect them from the environment. Four basic form factors are used: Wristwtch, wrist or console mount circular cylinder (puck), Rectangular or contoured wrist mount, and housed smartphone.
microprocessor

The logic-processing microcircuitry that converts the input signals into real time output data modelling the diver's decompression status using the chosen algorithm and other input data.
power supply
The battery that provides electrical power to run the device. It may be rechargeable, or user replaceable, or may require replacement by an authorised agent or the manufacturer.
random-access memory (RAM)

Temporary storage for the variable data and results of computation.
read-only memory (ROM)

Non-volatile memory containing the program and constants used in the algorithm.
data storage memory
Non-volatile data storage for updateable firmware and computed results. (dive log data). The amount of processed data that can be stored varies considerably, following the general trend for more memory in more recent models and for more processing capacity producing larger dive log file sizes.
strap
Band used to secure the housing to the user's wrist. Several types may be used. Double straps may be used for greater security. An alternative to straps is console mounting, usually limited to puck form factor recreational dive computers.
temperature sensor

Component that measures the temperature of the pressure transducer to compensate for temperature variations. The output may be recorded and displayed, but the primary function is to allow accurate pressure measurement.

Additional components may be necessary for additional or extended features and functionality.

accelerometer

Used to detect directional tapping input and pitch and tilt angles.
Bluetooth hardware

Used for communication with smartphones or personal computers to upload data and download firmware updates.
buzzer
Used to provide audible and vibratory alarms.
external electrical contacts
May be used for several purposes at the surface, including battery charging and communication with a personal computer.
GPS receiver

Used for position identification at the surface.
fluxgate compass

Used to provide compass functionality for navigation.
infrared data transfer hardware
Used for data transfer to and from personal computer.
light sensor
Used to provide automatic display intensity (screen brightness) to suit ambient light levels. In some models a display of measured light level may be available.
screen protector
Transparent sacrificial film or lens covering the screen to protect the screen against scratches.
ultrasonic communications hardware
Used for wireless communications with pressure sensors on gas cylinders for gas-integrated systems, and in some cases, other peripherals.
watertight electrical connections
To receive input from oxygen cells, and to communicate with electronically controlled rebreathers.
wireless charging coil

Used to recharge the battery without risk of compromising watertight seals.

== Function ==
Schematic structure of a dive computer

Dive computers are battery-powered computers within a watertight and pressure resistant case. These computers track the dive profile by measuring time and pressure. All dive computers measure the ambient pressure to model the concentration of gases in the tissues of the diver. More advanced dive computers provide additional measured data and user input into the calculations, for example, the water temperature, gas composition, altitude of the water surface, or the remaining pressure in the scuba cylinder. Dive computers suitable for calculating decompression for rebreather diving need to measure the oxygen partial pressure in the breathing loop. A dive computer may be used as the control unit for an electronically controlled closed circuit rebreather, in which case it will calculate oxygen partial pressure in the loop using the output from more than one oxygen sensor.

The computer uses the pressure and time input in a decompression algorithm to estimate the partial pressure of inert gases that have been dissolved in the diver's tissues. Based on these calculations, the computer estimates when an acceptably low risk direct ascent to the surface is no longer possible, and what decompression stops would be needed based on the profile of the dive up to that time and recent hyperbaric exposures which may have left residual dissolved gases in the diver.

Many dive computers are able to produce a low risk decompression schedule for dives that take place at altitude, which requires longer decompression than for the same profile at sea level, because the computers measure the atmospheric pressure before the dive and take this into account in the algorithm.

Many computers have some way for the user to adjust decompression conservatism. This may be by way of a personal factor, which makes an undisclosed change to the algorithm decided by the manufacturer, or the setting of gradient factors, a way of reducing the permitted supersaturation of tissue compartments by specific ratios, which is well defined in the literature, leaving the responsibility for making informed decisions on personal safety to the diver.

=== Algorithms ===
The decompression algorithms used in dive computers vary between manufacturers and computer models. Examples of decompression algorithms are the Bühlmann algorithms and their variants, the Thalmann VVAL18 Exponential/Linear model, the Varying Permeability Model, and the Reduced Gradient Bubble Model. The proprietary names for the algorithms do not always clearly describe the actual decompression model. The algorithm may be a variation of one of the standard algorithms, for example, several versions of the Bühlmann decompression algorithm are in use. The algorithm used may be an important consideration in the choice of a dive computer. Dive computers using the same internal electronics and algorithms may be marketed under a variety of brand names.

The algorithm used is intended to inform the diver of a decompression profile that will keep the risk of decompression sickness (DCS) to an acceptable level. Researchers use experimental diving programmes or data that has been recorded from previous dives to validate an algorithm. The dive computer measures depth and time, then uses the algorithm to determine decompression requirements or estimate remaining no-stop times at the current depth. An algorithm takes into account the magnitude of pressure reduction, breathing gas changes, repetitive exposures, rate of ascent, and time at altitude. Algorithms are not able to reliably account for age, previous injury, ambient temperature, body type, alcohol consumption, dehydration, and other factors such as patent foramen ovale, because the effects of these factors have not been experimentally quantified, though some may attempt to compensate for these by factoring in user input, and for diver peripheral temperature and workload by having sensors that monitor ambient temperature and cylinder pressure changes as a proxy. Water temperature is known to be a poor proxy for body temperature, as it does not account for the effectiveness of the diving suit or heat generated by work or active heating systems.

==== Choice of algorithm ====
The algorithms available are of two basic types: Dissolved gas models and bubble models. Neither type is able to provide a reliably safe profile in their basic form, and must be adjusted empirically to fit the data. The bubble models are likely to be closer to physiological reality, and may be more accurate outside of the range of reliably known empirical data, but are computationally complex. The dissolved gas models are computationally much simpler, and may require more data fitting processing, but even then remain significantly faster to run. A relatively simple method of controlling data fitting is by systematic adjustment of M-values, which can be done by varying gradient factors, both by preprogrammed (firmware) and user input options.

There is no conclusive evidence that any currently used algorithm is significantly better than all of the others, and by selective setting of the constants, most of them can be made to produce very similar ascent and decompression profiles for a given ingassing profile. When used in the recreational diving range of no-stop exposures on factory settings, it is likely that they are all acceptably safe, though some will clearly be more conservative than others. The question of whether the diver gains anything of value from the higher conservatism is an open question, when the rate of symptomatic decompression sickness is very low and the external risk factors are not yet amenable to computational analysis. Some manufacturers use their unverified and undisclosed modified algorithms as selling points, usually without making any specific claims about their effectiveness, and the user is in no position to make an educated choice due to the vagueness of the claims. Some others use algorithms well-defined in the literature, allowing the user who has sufficient understanding of the specific decompression model to make a relatively informed decision. Some of these also allow user modification of settings which modify algorithm conservatism following well defined methods such as gradient factors, further facilitating educated choice.

=== Display information ===
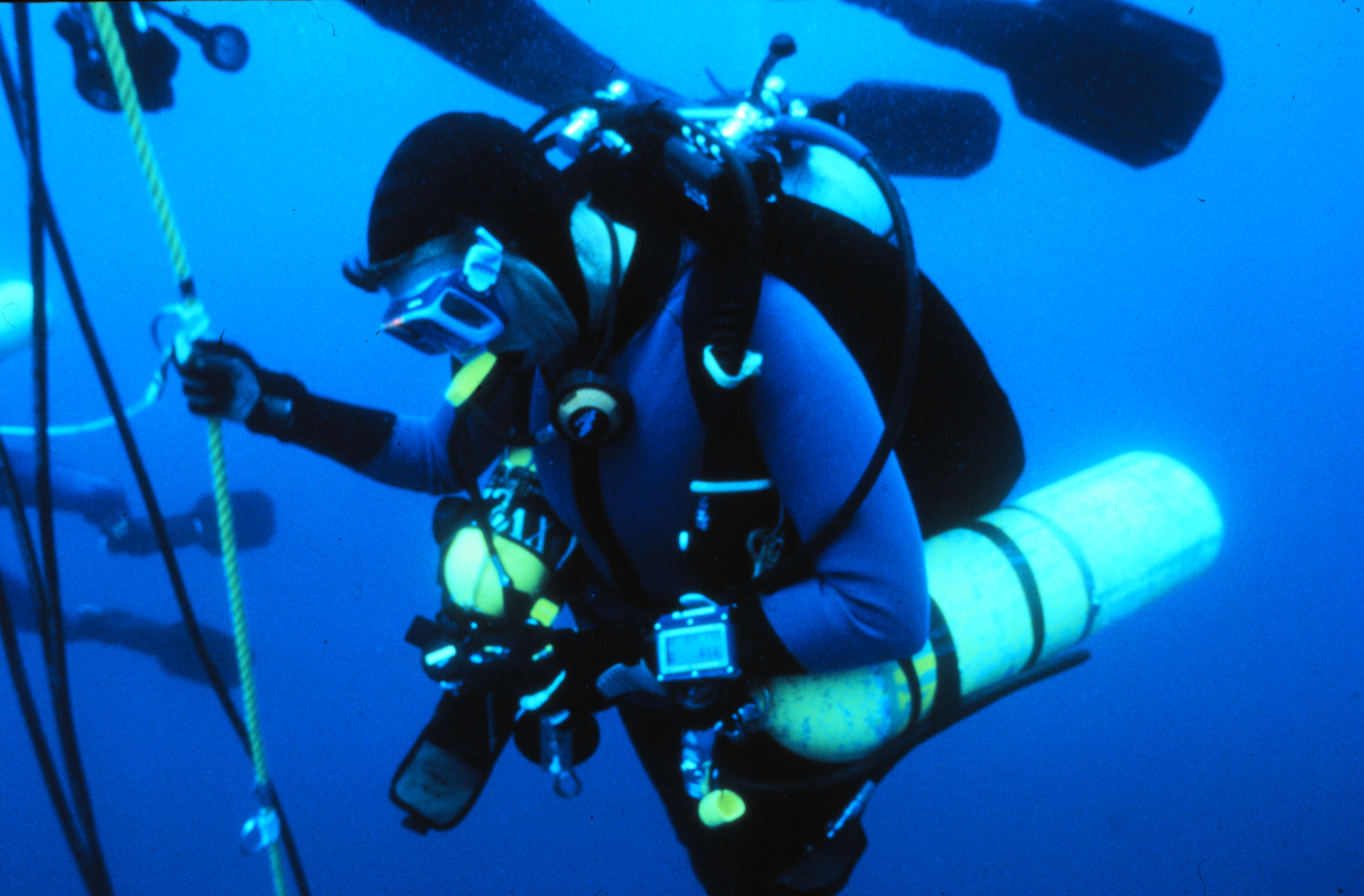
Technical diver wearing a dive computer on his left wrist during a decompression stop.

A watch sized dive computer incorporating an electronic compass and the ability to display cylinder pressure when used with an optional transmitter (Suunto D9)

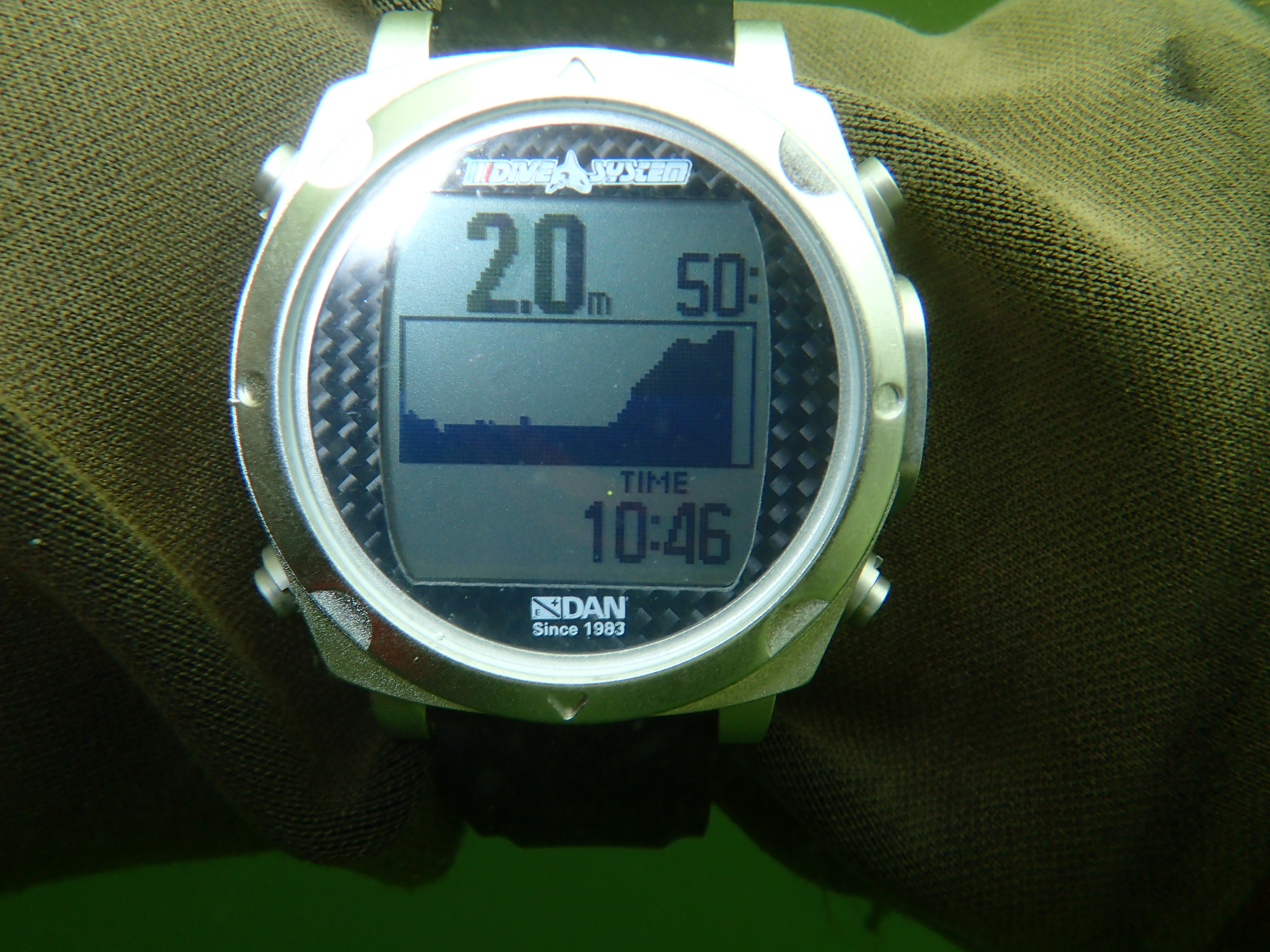
Dive computer dive profile display

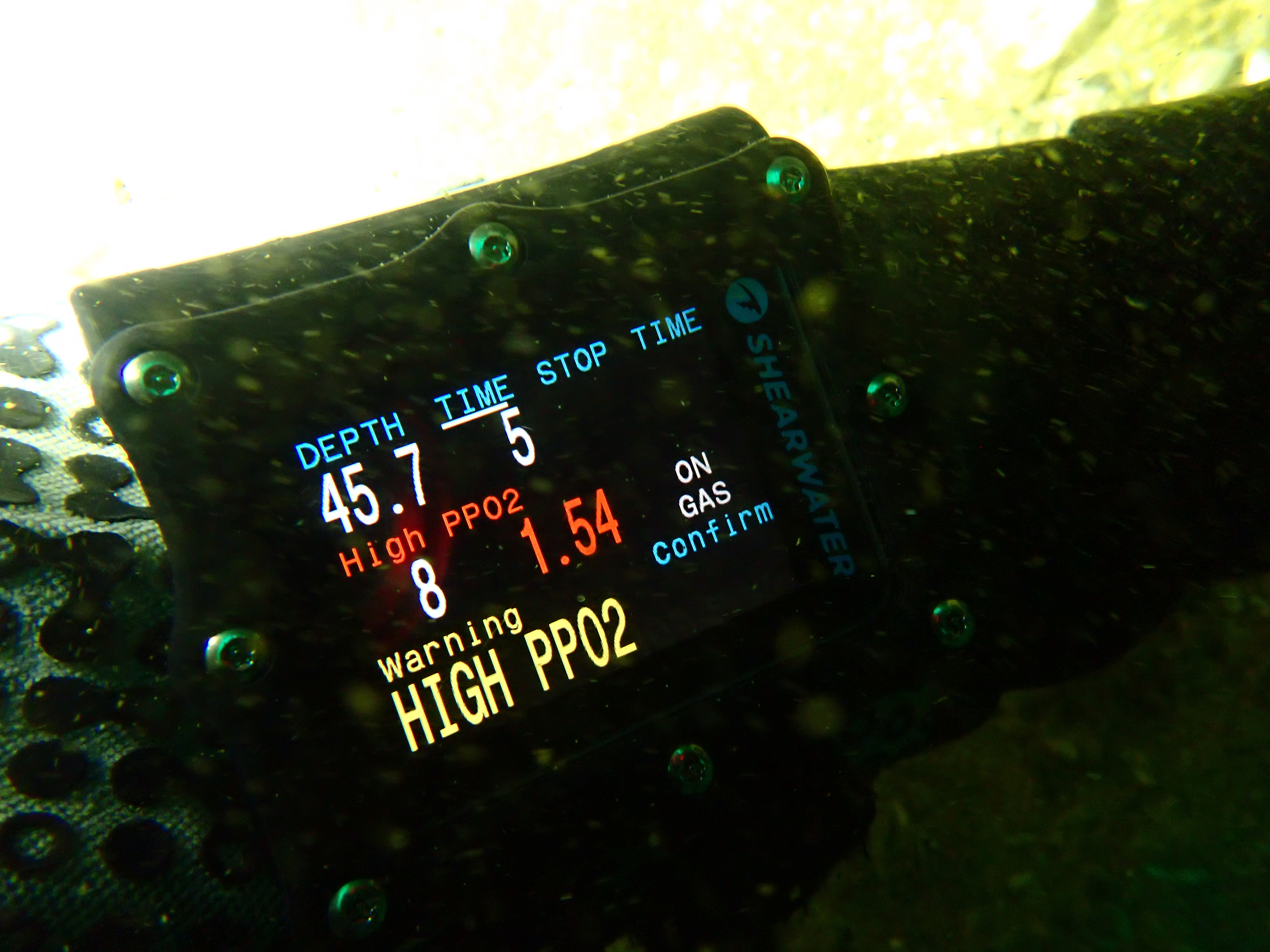
High oxygen partial pressure warning on Shearwater Perdix dive computer

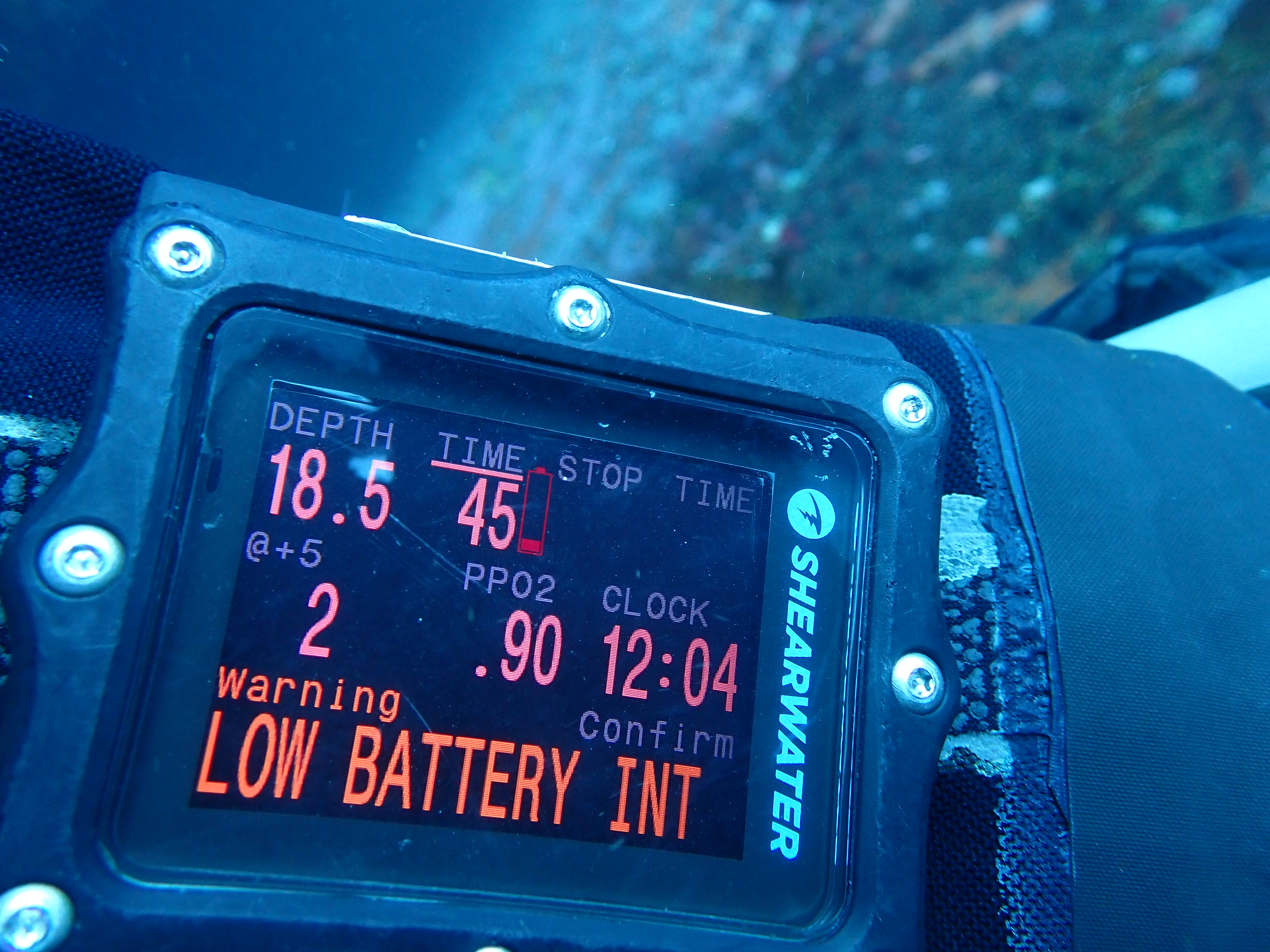
Shearwater Perdix dive computer low battery warning display

Dive computers provide a variety of visual dive information to the diver, usually on a LCD or OLED display. More than one screen arrangement may be selectable during a dive, and the primary screen will display by default and contain the safety critical data. Secondary screens are usually selected by pressing one or two buttons one or more times, and may be transient or remain visible until another screen is selected. All safety critical information should be visible on any screen that will not automatically revert within a short period, as the diver may forget how to get back to it and this may put them as significant risk. Some computers use a scroll through system which tends to require more button pushes, but is easier to remember, as eventually the right screen will turn up, others may use a wider selection of buttons, which is quicker when the sequence is known, but easier to forget or become confused, and may demand more of the diver's attention.

Most dive computers display the following basic dive profile and no-stop status information during the dive. This information includes safety critical information, and is usually displayed on the default underwater display, and some may be shown on all underwater displays:

- Current depth (derived from ambient pressure).
- Maximum depth reached on the current dive.
- No-stop time, the time remaining at the current depth without the need for decompression stops on ascent.
- Elapsed dive time of the current dive.

Many dive computers also display additional information. Some of this is safety-critical for decompression, and would usually be displayed on all screens available underwater, or have a timed default return to the primary screen: Most of the non-critical information is likely to be useful on at least some dives, and may be displayed on a secondary screen layout which can be selected during the dive.

- Total ascent time, or time to surface (TTS) assuming immediate ascent at recommended rate, and decompression stops as indicated. When multiple gases are enabled in the computer, the time to surface may be predicted based on the optimum gas being selected, during ascent, but the actual time to surface will depend on the actual gas selected, and may be longer than the displayed value. This does not invalidate the decompression calculation, which accounts for the actual exposure and gas selected.
- Required decompression stop depth and time, also assuming immediate ascent at recommended rate. The depth and duration of the first stop are usually displayed prominently.
- Ambient temperature, (actually temperature of the pressure transducer). This may be a default display or a user selected setting, and may not be on the primary display, as it is not safety-critical information.
- Current ascent rate. This may be displayed as an actual speed of ascent, or a relative rate compared to the recommended rate.
- Dive profile (often not displayed during the dive, but transmitted to a personal computer). Not a safety-critical information, so usually on a temporary secondary display if available
- Gas mixture in use, as selected by the user.
- Oxygen partial pressure at current depth, based on selected gas mixture.
- Cumulative oxygen toxicity exposure (CNS), computed from measured pressure and time and selected gas mixture.
- Battery charge status or low battery warning.
- Time of day, often with a 12hour or 24 hour format option.
- Compass heading, using a flux gate sensor, with tilt corrections. When available this is usually combined with displays of all safety critical data, so that it does not have to automatically revert to the primary display layout.

A few computers will display additional information on decompression status after the no-stop limit has been exceeded. These data may be selected as optional display settings by the diver, and may require a more comprehensive understanding of decompression theory and modelling than provided by recreational diver training. They are intended as information that may help a technical diver make a more informed decision while dealing with a contingency that affects decompression risk.

- At depth + 5 minutes, (@+5), shows the effect on time to surface of remaining at the current depth on the current breathing gas for five more minutes. The display will show the amended TTS.
- Delta + 5 (Δ+5) is the change in time to surface if remaining at the same depth on the same gas for 5 minutes longer. This value will be positive if ingassing, negative if outgassing, and 0 if the extra exposure has no net effect on computed decompression obligation. This is useful for multi-level dives, where it helps estimate whether there will still be enough breathing gas for the ascent.
- Decompression ceiling, the depth at which calculated supersaturation of the controlling tissue is at the maximum permissible level according to the algorithm. This is the shallowest depth to which the diver can ascend with acceptable decompression risk according to the chosen constraints. This depth will be equal to or shallower than the current obligatory stop depth and deeper than the next obligatory stop. When decompression is completed, the ceiling will be zero.
- Current gradient factor (GF99), an indication of the diver's current proximity to the baseline M-value of the algorithm in the limiting tissue. If it exceeds 100% then the diver is oversaturated according to the algorithm's least conservative setting. This value will slowly decrease at each decompression stop, and increase during the ascent to the next stop. This functionality may be useful in a contingency when the diver needs to exit the water as soon as possible but at a reasonable decompression risk. Responsible use of this feature requires a good understanding of the theory of decompression and how it is modeled by the computer.
- Surfacing gradient factor, The calculated gradient factor for the controlling tissue if the diver were to surface directly from the current depth, without any stops. The figure shown is a percentage of the calculated M-value at that stage of the dive. If it exceeds 99%, the risk of DCS is higher than for the baseline M-value, and if lower, then the risk is lower than for the baseline M-value, When indicated decompression clears, it will be at the GF-Hi value the diver selected, This is an optional way of monitoring decompression status which could be useful in an emergency.

Some computers, known as air-integrated, or gas-integrated, are designed to display information from a diving cylinder pressure sensor, such as:

- Gas pressure.
- Estimated remaining air time (RAT) based on available gas, rate of gas consumption and ascent time.

Some computers can provide a real time display of the oxygen partial pressure in the rebreather. This requires an input from an oxygen cell. These computers will also calculate cumulative oxygen toxicity exposure based on measured partial pressure.

Some computers can display a graph of the current tissue saturation for several tissue compartments, according to the algorithm in use.

Some information, which has no practical use during a dive, is only shown at the surface to avoid an information overload of the diver during the dive:

- "Time to Fly" display showing when the diver can safely board an airplane.
- Desaturation time, the estimated time required to return all tissues to surface pressure dissolved gas equilibrium.
- A log of key information about previous dives – date, start time, maximum depth, duration, and possibly others.
- Maximum non-decompression bottom times for subsequent dives based on the estimated residual concentration of the inert gases in the tissues.
- Dive planning functions (no decompression time based on current tissue loads and user-selected depth and breathing gas).

Warnings and alarms may include:

- Maximum operating depth exceeded
- No decompression limit approaching
- No decompression limit exceeded
- Excessive ascent rate
- Decompression ceiling violation
- Omitted decompression
- Low cylinder pressure (where applicable)
- Oxygen partial pressure high or low
- Maximum depth violation

=== Audible information ===
Many dive computers have warning buzzers that warn the diver of events such as:

- Excessive ascent rates.
- Missed decompression stops.
- Maximum operation depth exceeded.
- Oxygen toxicity limits exceeded.
- Decompression ceiling violation, or stop depth violation

Some buzzers can be turned off to avoid the noise.

=== Data sampling, storage and upload ===
Data sampling rates generally range from once per second to once per 30 seconds, though there have been cases where a sampling rate as low as once in 180 seconds has been used. This rate may be user selectable. Depth resolution of the display generally ranges between 1m and 0.1m. The recording format for depth over the sampling interval could be maximum depth, depth at the sampling time, or the average depth over the interval. For a small interval these will not make a significant difference to the calculated decompression status of the diver, and are the values at the point where the computer is carried by the diver, which is usually a wrist or suspended on a console, and may vary in depth differently to the depth of the demand valve, which determines breathing gas pressure, which is the relevant pressure for decompression computation.

Temperature resolution for data records varies between 0.1 °C to 1 °C. Accuracy is generally not specified, and there is often a lag of minutes as the sensor temperature changes to follow the water temperature. Temperature is measured at the pressure sensor, and is needed primarily to provide correct pressure data, so it is not a high priority for decompression monitoring to give the precise ambient temperature in real time.

Data storage is limited by internal memory, and the amount of data generated depends on the sampling rate. Capacity may be specified in hours of run time, number of dives recorded, or both. Values of up to 100 hours were available by 2010. This may be influenced by sampling rate selected by the diver.

By 2010, most dive computers had the ability to upload the data to a PC or smartphone, by cable, infrared or Bluetooth wireless connection.

== Special purpose dive computers ==
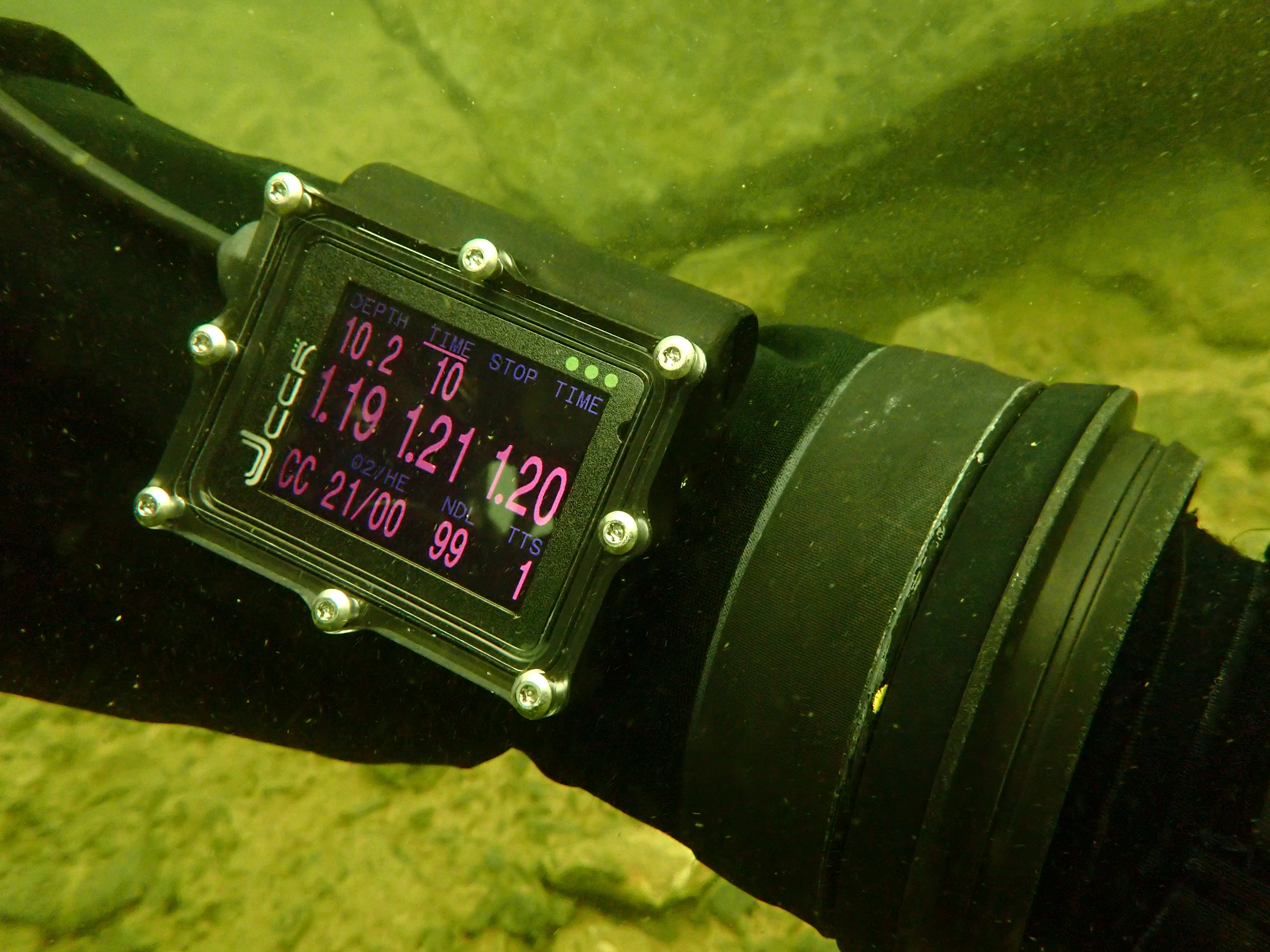
Dive computer showing three oxygen cell readings from a CCR in the middle row

Some dive computers are able to calculate decompression schedules for breathing gases other than air, such as nitrox, pure oxygen, trimix or heliox. The more basic nitrox dive computers only support one or two gas mixes for each dive. Others support many different mixes. When multiple gases are supported, there may be an option to set those which will be carried on the dive as active, which sets the computer to calculate the decompression schedule and time to surface based on the assumption that the active gases will be used when they are optimal for decompression. Calculation of tissue gas loads will generally follow the gas actually selected by the diver, unless there is multiple cylinder pressure monitoring to enable automatic gas selection by the computer.

=== Closed circuit rebreather monitoring and control ===
Most dive computers calculate decompression for open circuit scuba where the proportions of the breathing gases are constant for each mix: these are "constant fraction" dive computers. Other dive computers are designed to model the gases in closed circuit scuba (diving rebreathers), which maintain constant partial pressures of gases by varying the proportions of gases in the mixture: these are "constant partial pressure" dive computers. They may be switched over to constant fraction mode if the diver bails out to open circuit. There are also dive computers which monitor oxygen partial pressure in real time in combination with a user nominated diluent mixture to provide a real-time updated mix analysis which is then used in the decompression algorithm to provide decompression information, and optionally, control of the CCR gas mixture.

=== Freediving computers ===
A freediving computer, or general purpose dive computer in freediving mode, will record breath hold dive details automatically while the diver is underwater, and the length of the surface interval between dives. It records each dive, so there is a record of the number of dives. This is useful to ensure adequate surface interval to clear carbon dioxide buildup.

Surface interval times are also useful to monitor to avoid taravana, the freediving decompression sickness. A dive computer is also the most effective way to notify the diver of the depth at which free-fall should start by a free-fall alarm. Monitoring descent and ascent speed, and verifying maximum depth are also useful when training for efficiency.

Two types of freediving computer are available, the ones that are dedicated to freediving, and those that are also scuba decompression computers, with a freediving mode. A stopwatch is useful for timing static apnea, rechargeable batteries are an option in some models, and GPS can be useful for spearfishers who wish to mark a place and return to it later. A few models offer a heart rate monitor.

== Additional functionality and features ==
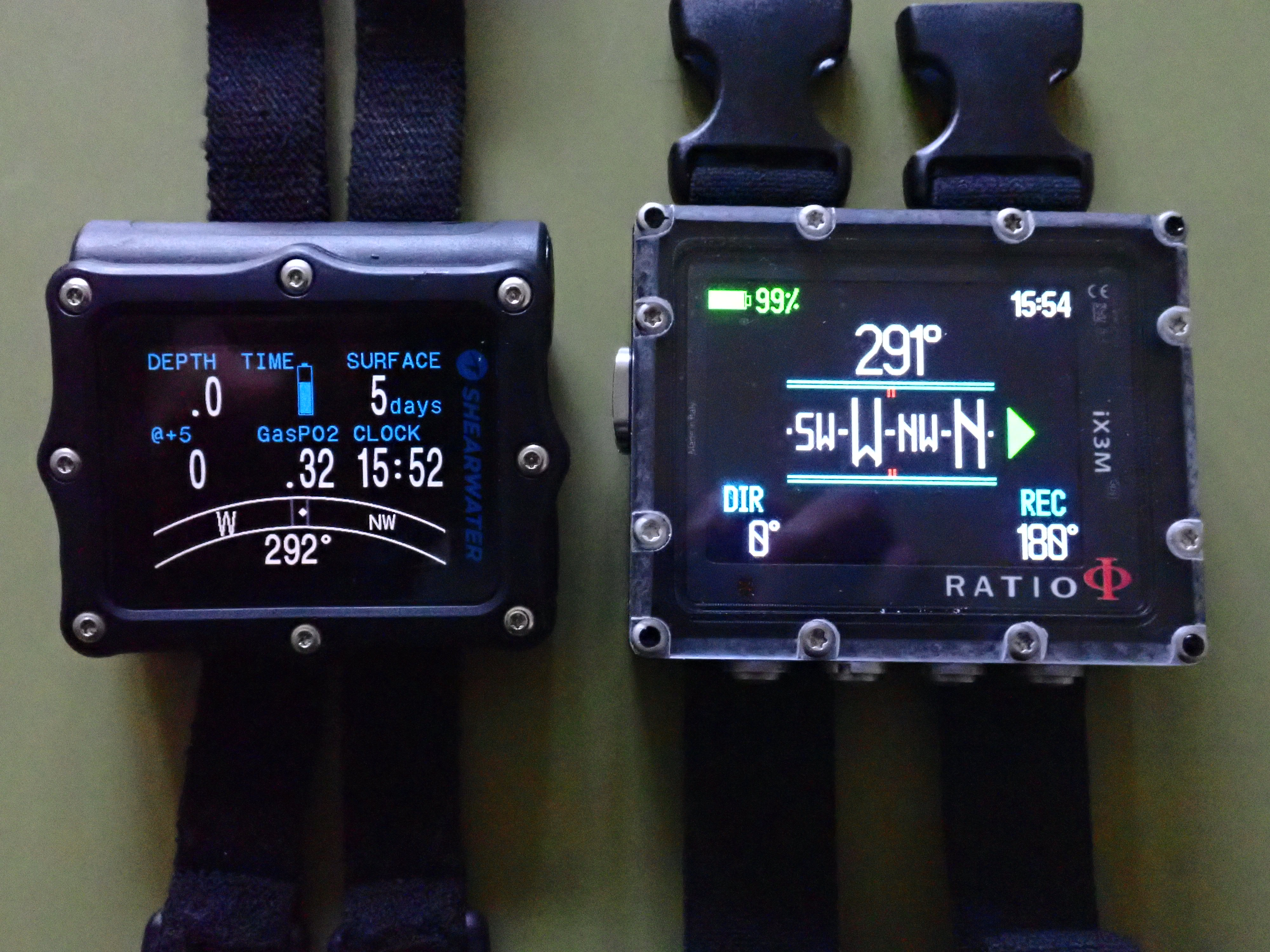
Shearwater Perdix and Ratio iX3M GPS dive computers in compass mode

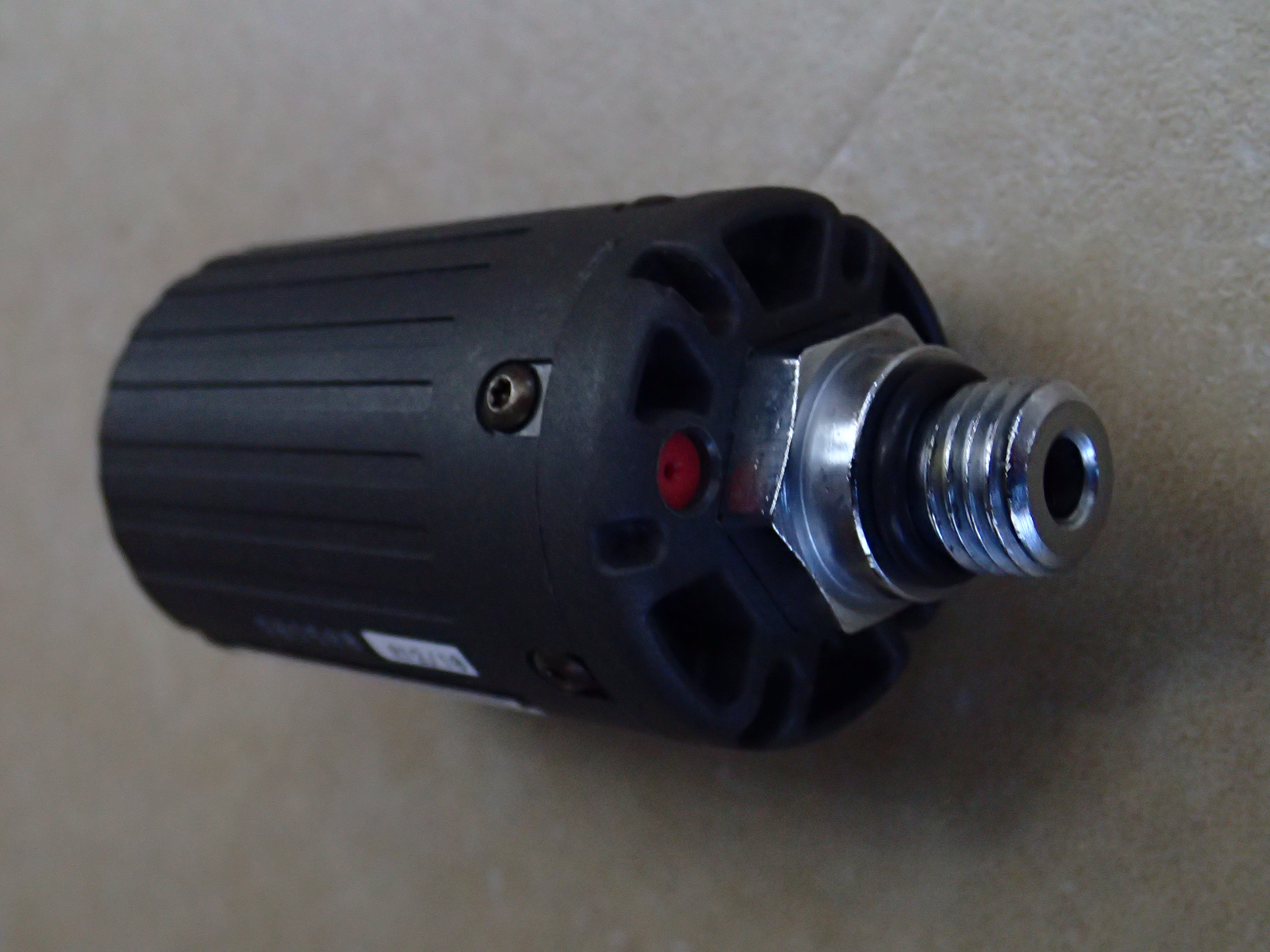
Submersible wireless pressure transmitter for remote dive computer display

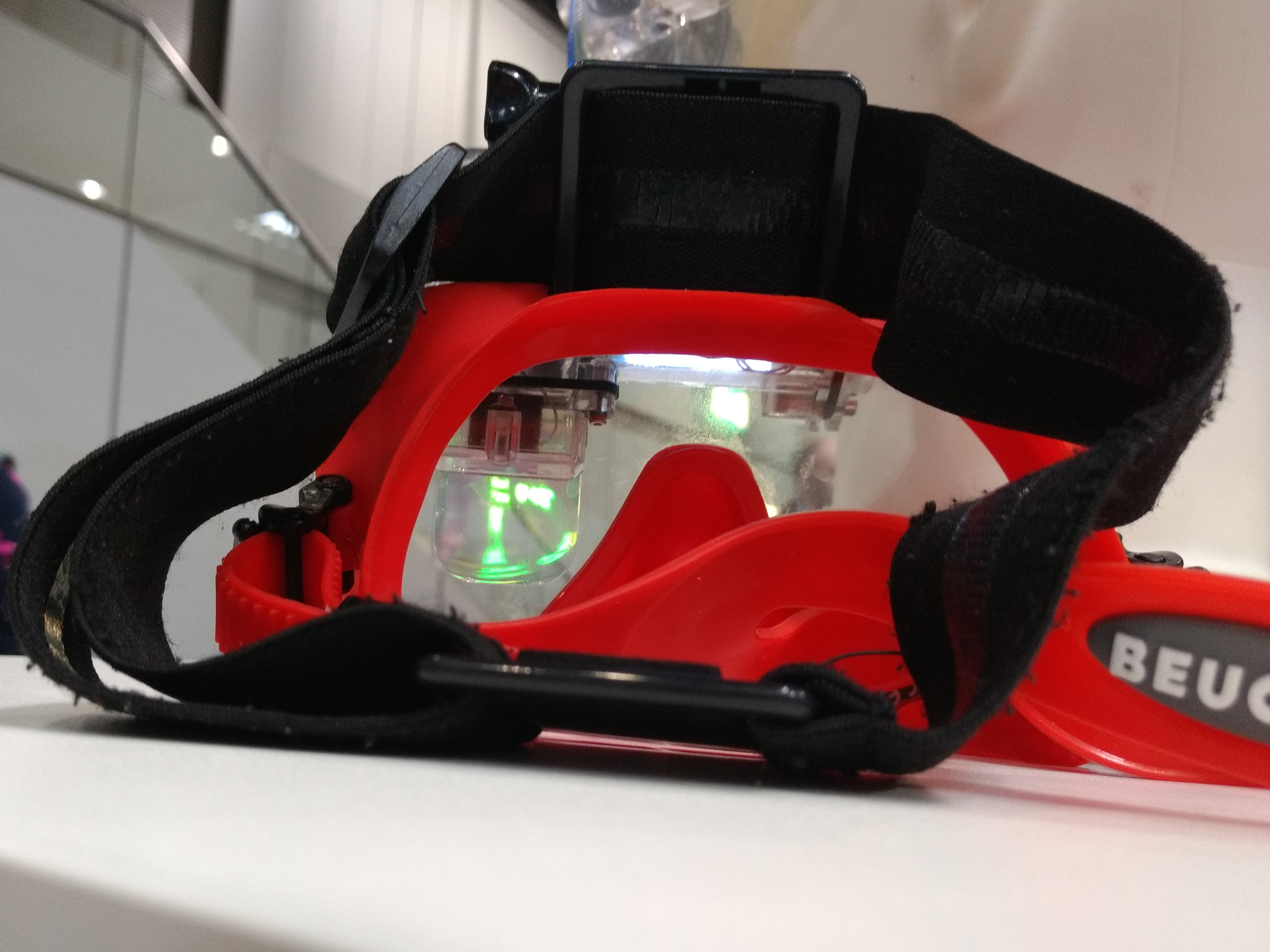
Mask with head-up display at focal distance of about 2 m

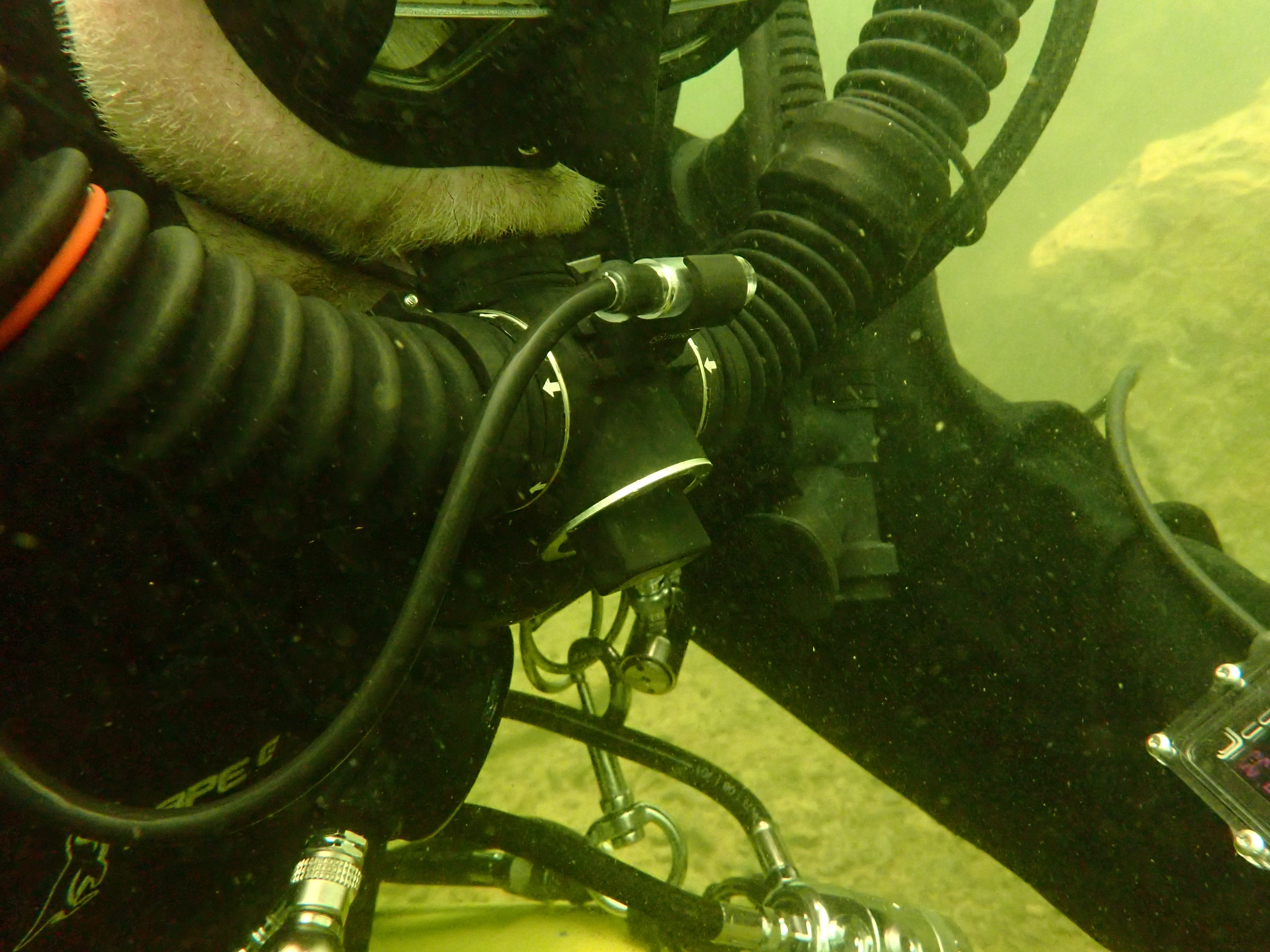
Head-up display mounted on rebreather moutpiece

Some dive computers provide additional functionality, generally a subset of those listed below:

- Breathing gas oxygen analyser
- Electronic compass
- Gas blending calculator
- Global navigation satellite receiver (only works at the surface)
- Light-meter
- Lunar phase indicator (useful for estimating tidal conditions)
- Magnetometer (for detecting ferrous metal)
- Pitch and roll angle
- Stopwatch
- Time of day in a second time zone
- Time to surface after another 5 minutes at current depth on current gas.
- Gauge mode (overrides decompression monitoring, and just records and displays depth and time and leaves the diver to control decompression by following tables). Selecting gauge mode may reset the tissue saturation records to default, which invalidates any further decompression calculations until the diver has fully desaturated.
- Air integration (AI), also known as gas integration: – Some dive computers are designed to measure, display, and monitor pressure in one or more diving cylinders. The computer is either connected to the first stage by a high pressure hose, or uses a wireless pressure transmitter on the regulator first stage to provide a wireless data signal indicating remaining cylinder pressure, The signals are encoded to eliminate the risk of one diver's computer picking up a signal from another diver's transducer, or interference from other sources. Some dive computers can receive a signal from more than one remote pressure transducer. The Ratio iX3M Tech and others can process and display pressures from up to 10 transmitters.
- Workload modification of decompression algorithm based on gas consumption rate from integrated gas pressure monitor.
- Heart rate monitor from remote transducer. This can also be used to modify the decompression algorithm to allow for an assumed workload.
- Graphic display of calculated tissue compartment inert gas tensions during and after the dive.
- Indication of computed decompression ceiling in addition to the more usual next stop depth. The effects on decompression risk of following the ceiling rather than remaining below the stop depth is not known, but stop depths are arbitrarily chosen for the calculation of decompression tables, and time spent at any depth below the indicated ceiling depth is processed by the same algorithm.
- Display of supersaturation of limiting tissue as a percentage of M-value in the event of an immediate ascent. This is an indicator of decompression risk in the event of an emergency ascent.
- Display of current supersaturation of limiting tissue as a percentage of M-value during ascent. This is an indication of decompression stress and risk in real time.
- Multiple active gases for open circuit and closed circuit diluent.
- Deactivation of gas options during dive in case of lost gas. This will trigger the computer to recalculate the estimated time to surface without the deactivated gases.
- Definition of a new gas during the dive to allow calculations for decompression on gas supplied by another diver.
- Battery charge status.
- Alternative decompression algorithms.

Features and accessories of some models:

- Piezo-electric buttons (no moving parts)
- User input by directional tapping
- Rechargeable batteries.
- Wireless charging.
- Optional battery types. For example the Shearwater Perdix and Petrel 2 can use 1.5V alkaline cells or 3.6V lithium cells provided they have the same physical format (AA).
- User changeable batteries.
- Battery redundancy.
- User selected display colours (useful for the colour-blind), and variable brightness.
- Screen inversion for ambidextrous use of units with plug-in cable connections for oxygen monitors.
- Mask or mouthpiece mounted head-up display. (NERD)
- Wireless downloading of dive log data.
- Firmware upgrades over the Internet via Bluetooth or USB cable from smart phone or personal computer.
- Display prompts for changing settings.
- Twin straps or bungee straps for improved security.
- Strap extensions for wristwatch format computers to allow for fitting over the forearm on bulky diving suits.
- Aftermarket straps, for improved security, colour options or convenience.
- Screen protectors, in the form of a self-adhesive transparent plastic film or a rigid transparent plastic cover.
- Software for downloading, display and analysis of logged data. Most downloadable dive computers have a proprietary application, and many can also interface with open source software such as Subsurface. Some can down and upload via a smartphone to the cloud.
- Final stop depth option of 3 msw or 6 msw.
- Continuous decompression following a ceiling or staged decompression options.

=== User settings ===
User settings are options that can be manually selected by the diver to provide information that the computer cannot select automatically. Not all computers have them and not all settings are available on those computers which have user options.

Dive mode options may be available which can be selected depending on whether the dive is to be a freedive, open circuit scuba on single or multiple gases, closed circuit scuba, open circuit bailout, gauge mode, Avelo mode. If air integration and real-time oxygen partial pressure monitoring are provided, some of these setting may be automated.

Conservatism options are a common user setting option. They may be input in various ways, some requiring understanding of the algorithm functionality, and others relatively arbitrary, and with details of the function often not disclosed to the user. The value of the more arbitrary settings in not clear and it is not practicable to make a realistic estimate of their value to the user. A more accessible user option is to provide gradient factor setting as user input. These adjust the basic M-values set for the tissue compartments in the firmware by a linear factor depending on the depth. GF_{low} is the adjustment that affects the depth where the ascent slows down and the first stop is made. A small value for GF_{low} induces deeper stops, which can occur when some tissues are still ingassing. A large value for GF_{low} induces a shallower first stop, at the cost of higher decompression stress in the first part of the ascent.

GF_{high} setting affects the time spent decompressing at the shallow stop and the surfacing supersaturation allowed as a percentage fraction of the M-value set for surfacing in the basic algorithm.

In some cases the manufacturer may state that their conservatism factor is equivalent to a specific gradient factor, which tells the diver what its effect will be to the same extent as letting them input the same gradient factors. but other conservatism settings are entirely obscure.

Some computers allow the user to choose between 6 and 3m for the depth of the last obligatory decompression stop. This can make it easier to maintain a consistent depth in large swells, but with most gas mixtures, decompression will be slower. The default depth is commonly 3m. With computers that indicate current ceiling, the ceiling will not be affected by the setting, and will rise above the actual depth in the usual way. Some Suunto computers indicate a maximum ceiling of 3m, but some Shearwaters will raise the ceiling in steps of 1m until decompression is clear.

There may be a user option to select whether to add a safety stop, and if so, how long it should be and at what depth range. A safety stop is by definition not an obligatory stop, so there should be no penalty for disregarding it, though doing it may give an outgassing credit for the time and depth spent, particularly if the gas has a high partial pressure of oxygen. There is nothing stopping the diver from just doing additional shallow stop time and allowing the algorithm to compute the effects for any computer, though there is no guarantee that all computers will give credit for the extra time.

=== Display options ===
Some computers require the user to switch between screens to view additional information, others provide default critical dive information on several screen views which van be selected during a dive, and allow user options of useful but non-essential information to be displayed on the main screen image, while still making the other screen views accessible during dives if they are likely to be useful.

=== Housed smartphones ===
Smartphones in underwater housings running a decompression monitoring app may be able to take photos or video as well, provided the housing is suitable.

=== Avelo mode ===
An optional mode for assessing real time buoyancy status for a diver using the Avelo diving system buoyancy compensation is available on a small number of Shearwater (Tern TX, Teric, Peregrine TX, or Perdix 2) and Scubapro (G2C) dive computers via firmware downloads. As of April 2025 this feature was available on Shearwater Teric wrist computers and Scubapro console computers. Real time cylinder pressure input is required, but may be via a high pressure hose (G2C) or a wireless pressure sensor (Teric). The software estimates the magnitude of positive or negative buoyancy based on the volume of ballast water added to the hydrocyinder during the dive after a neutral buoyancy state has been achieved and confirmed by the diver. Displayed information is intended to advise the diver on when to adjust the ballast so that lung volume will be sufficient for fine buoyancy control. Other user input allows wetsuit compression to be factored in.

== Safety and reliability ==
The ease of use of dive computers can allow divers to perform complex dives with little planning. Divers may rely on the computer instead of dive planning and monitoring. Dive computers are intended to reduce risk of decompression sickness, and allow easier monitoring of the dive profile. Where present, breathing gas integration allows easier monitoring of remaining gas supply, and warnings can alert the diver to some high risk situations, but the diver remains responsible for planning and safe execution of the dive plan. The computer cannot guarantee safety, and only monitors a fraction of the situation. The diver must remain aware of the rest by personal observation and attention to the ongoing situation. A dive computer can also fail during a dive, due to malfunction or misuse.

=== Failure modes and probability of failure ===
It is possible for a dive computer to malfunction during a dive. Manufacturers are not obliged to publish reliability statistics, and generally only include a warning in the user manual that they are used at the diver's own risk. Reliability has markedly improved over time, particularly for the hardware.

==== Hardware failures ====
Mechanical and electrical failures:

- Leaks allowing ingress of water to the electronic components, may be caused by:
  - Cracked faceplate, which is more likely with hard, scratch-resistant glass and sapphire used on watch format units. They are strong, but brittle, and can shatter under impact with a sufficiently hard point contact.
  - Seal failures can occur at joints, probably most often at the battery closure, as it is usually the most often disturbed. Computers with user serviceable batteries often use a double O-ring barrel seal to provide a more reliable seal.
- Button failures are one of the more frequent problems, some models are particularly susceptible. Occasionally the failure is in the form of leaks, but more often the switch fails open, which is sometimes a fatigue problem. Pressure sensitive switches with no moving parts are sometimes used to avoid this problem. Magnetic switches can fail due to magnet corrosion. Buttons which work by external electrical contact can malfunction due to salt deposits. This is most likely to occur out of the water.
- Depth sensor malfunctions can occur due to salt buildup on the sensor external surface.
- Circuitry failures, other than switch failures, often due to water or battery leaks causing internal corrosion.
- Battery failure, such as running down unexpectedly, leaking, or failing to charge properly. Internal rechargeable batteries exchange a lower risk of water leaks for a higher risk of battery degradation over time.
- Non-rechargeable lithium batteries can explode if incorrectly used in a dive computer with charging facilities.
- Rubber wrist straps can deteriorate and weaken over time and can tear in use. If there is only one strap the computer may be lost if it breaks.

==== Software failures and reliability issues ====
There have been several instances where dive computers have been recalled due to significant safety issues in the software or factory calibration. Earlier dive computers had to have software upgrades at the factory or an approved agent. This has changed and as of 2024, it is common to be able to update firmware over the internet, via bluetooth or a cable connection.

A series of Uwatec Aladin Air X NitrOx dive computers made in 1995 was recalled in 2003 due to faulty software which miscalculated desaturation time, leading to at least seven cases of DCS attributed to their use. This is not the only recall for faulty software or calibration, Suunto D6 and D9s were recalled in 2006, Oceanic Versa Pro 2A in 2006, and Dacor Darwin computers in 2005, but no injuries were reported, and the units were recalled relatively soon after the problems were reported. The Uwatec Aladin Air X Nitrox recall occurred during a class action suit and after several related lawsuits against the company and several alleged cover-ups, starting as early as 1996. The case was settled on the eve of trial.

=== Inherent risk ===
The main problem in establishing decompression algorithms for both dive computers and production of decompression tables, is that the gas absorption and release under pressure in the human body is still not completely understood. Furthermore, the risk of decompression sickness also depends on the physiology, fitness, condition and health of the individual diver. The safety record of most dive computers indicates that when used according to the manufacturer's instructions, and within the recommended depth range, the risk of decompression sickness is low.

Personal settings to adjust conservatism of the algorithm are available for most dive computers. They may be input as undisclosed personal factors, as reductions to M-values by a fixed ratio, by gradient factor, or by selecting a bubble size limit in VPM and RGBM models. The personal settings for recreational computers tend to be additional to the conservatism factors programmed into the algorithm by the manufacturer. Technical diving computers tend to allow a wider range of choice at the user's discretion, and provide warnings that the diver should ensure that they understand what they are doing and the associated risk before adjusting from the moderately conservative factory settings.

=== Human error ===
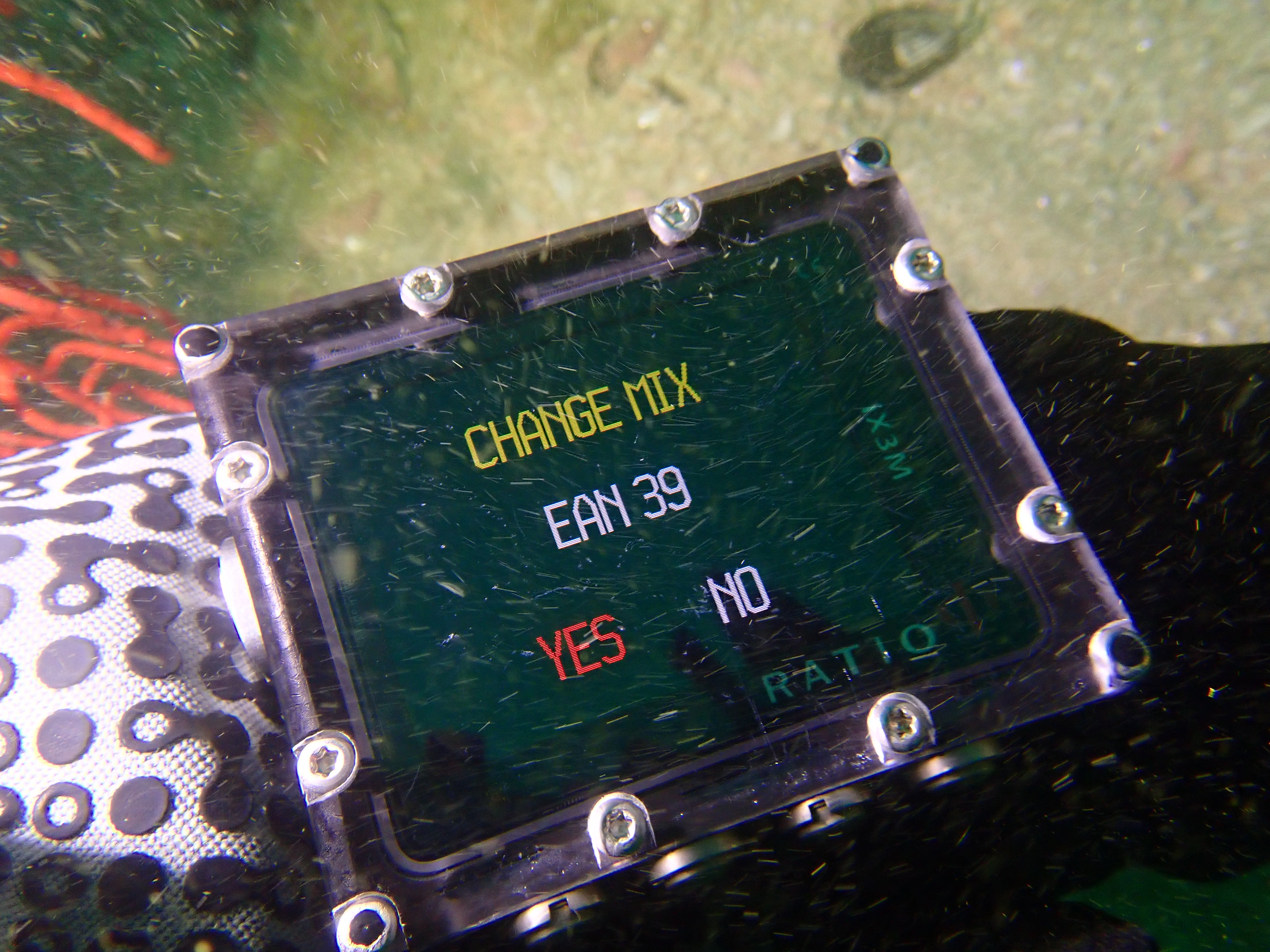
Confirmation message for gas change on Ratio iX3M dive computer

Many dive computers have menus, various selectable options and various display modes, which are controlled by a small number of buttons. Control of the computer display differs between manufacturers and in some cases between models by the same manufacturer. The diver may need information not displayed on the default screen during a dive, and the button sequence to access the information may not be immediately obvious. If the diver becomes familiar with the control of the computer on dives where the information is not critical before relying on it for more challenging dives there is less risk of confusion which may lead to an accident. Most dive computers are supplied with default factory settings for algorithm conservatism, and maximum oxygen partial pressure, which are acceptably safe in the opinion of the manufacturer's legal advisors. Some of these may be changed to user preferences, which will affect risk. The user manual will generally provide instructions for adjusting and resetting to factory default, with some information on how to choose appropriate user settings. Responsibility for appropriate use of user settings lies with the user who makes or authorises the settings. There is a risk of the user making inappropriate choices due to lack of understanding or input error.

In some cases it can be easy to select the wrong setting by accidentally double pressing the same button with cold fingers encased in thick gloves. The process of correcting the setting can be unfamiliar and take a considerably greater number of buttons pressed at a time when there are other important matters to attend to. An example of this type of error would be accidentally selecting oxygen as the breathing gas instead of a travel gas because oxygen is at the top of the gas options list. This is an error that must be corrected as soon as possible as it will set off alarms and cause unsafe decompression calculation errors. Confirmation messages during gas switches can reduce the risk of user error at the cost of an extra button press.

=== Management and mitigation strategies ===
If the diver has been monitoring decompression status and is within the no-decompression limits, a computer failure can be acceptably managed by simply surfacing at the recommended ascent rate, and if possible, doing a short safety stop near the surface. If, however the computer could fail while the diver has a decompression obligation, or cannot make a direct ascent, some form of backup is prudent. The dive computer can be considered safety-critical equipment when there is a significant decompression obligation, as failure without some form of backup system can expose the diver to a risk of severe injury or death.

The diver may carry a backup dive computer. The probability of both failing at the same time is orders of magnitude lower. Use of a backup which is the same model as the primary simplifies use and reduces the probability of user error, particularly under stress, but makes the equipment redundancy less statistically independent. Statistics for failure rates of dive computers do not appear to be publicly available.

If diving to a well regulated buddy system where both divers follow closely matched dive profiles, using the same gases, the buddy's dive computer may be sufficient backup.

If a backup computer uses a different conservatism, the backup should be the less conservative otherwise or it may go into a violation mode during a dive and become useless.

A dive profile can be planned before the dive, and followed closely to allow reversion to the planned schedule if the computer fails. This implies the availability of a backup timer and depth gauge, or the schedule will be useless. It also requires the diver to follow the planned profile conservatively.

Some organisations such as the American Academy of Underwater Sciences have recommended that a dive plan should be established before the dive and then followed throughout the dive unless the dive is aborted. This dive plan should be within the limits of the decompression tables to increase the margin of safety, and to provide a backup decompression schedule based on the dive tables in case the computer fails underwater. The disadvantage of this extremely conservative use of dive computers is that when used this way, the dive computer is merely used as a bottom timer, and the advantages of real time computation of decompression status – the original purpose of dive computers – are sacrificed. This recommendation is not in the 2018 version of the AAUS Standards for Scientific diving: Manual.

A diver wishing to further reduce the risk of decompression sickness can take additional precautionary measures, such as one or more of:

- Use a dive computer with a relatively conservative decompression model. This may be difficult to estimate accurately as some manufacturers do not provide the user with much useful information on the inherent level of conservatism of their algorithms or the actual effect of the available user input modifications.
- Induce additional conservatism in the algorithm by selecting a more conservative personal setting or using a higher altitude setting than the actual dive altitude indicates.
- Add additional deep safety stops during a deep dive (the efficacy of this approach has not been supported by experiment)
- Make a slower ascent. This will reduce decompression stress in the earlier parts of the ascent, but will make the total time to surface longer if the decompression stress later in the ascent is not to be increased.
- Add additional shallow safety stops, or stay longer at the stops than required by the computer
- Have a long surface interval between dives. This will decrease risk provided the outgassing calculations of the algorithm are accurate or conservative.
- If using a backup computer, run one on a low conservatism setting as an indication of fastest acceptable risk ascent for an emergency, and the other at the diver's preferred conservatism for personally acceptable risk when there is no contingency and no rush to surface. The diver can always elect to do more decompression than indicated as necessary by the computer for a lower risk of decompression sickness without incurring a penalty for later dives. Some dive computers can be set to a different gradient factor during a dive, which has the same effect if the diver can remember under stress how to make the adjustment, and some computers can be set to display the maximum tissue supersaturation value for an immediate ascent.
- Continue to breathe oxygen enriched gas after surfacing, either in the water while waiting for the boat, after exiting the water, or both. The dive computer will not give credit for this, but it will provide a larger oxygen window which will flush more inert gas from the tissues. The risk of developing oxygen toxicity from this practice is negligible.

=== Management of violations ===
Violations of the safety limits as indicated by the computer display may occur during a dive for various reasons, including user error and circumstances beyond the diver's control. How this is handled depends on the decompression model, how the algorithm implements the model, and how the manufacturer chooses to interpret and apply the violation criteria.

Many computers go into a "lockout mode" for 24 to 48 hours if the diver violates the safety limits set by the manufacturer, to discourage continued diving after what the manufacturer deems an unsafe dive. Once in lockout mode, these computers will not function until the lockout period has ended. This is usually a reasonable response if lockout is initiated after the dive, as the algorithm will have been used out of scope and the manufacturer will reasonably prefer to avoid further responsibility for its use until tissues can be considered desaturated. When lockout happens underwater it will leave the diver without any decompression information at the time when it is most needed. For example, the Apeks Quantum will stop displaying the depth if the 100 m depth limit is exceeded, but will lock out 5 minutes after surfacing for a missed decompression stop. The Scubapro/Uwatec Galileo technical trimix computer will switch to gauge mode at 155 m after a warning, after which the diver will get no decompression information. Other computers, for example Delta P's VR3, Cochran NAVY, and the Shearwater range will continue to function, providing 'best guess' functionality while warning the diver that a stop has been missed, or a ceiling violated.

Some dive computers are extremely sensitive to violations of indicated decompression stop depth. The HS Explorer is programmed to credit time spent even slightly (0.1 metre) above the indicated stop depth at only 1/60 of the nominal rate. There is no theoretical or experimental basis claimed as justification for this hard limit. Others, such as the Shearwater Perdix, will fully credit any decompression done below the calculated decompression ceiling, which may be displayed as a user selectable option, and is always equal to or shallower than the indicated stop depth. This strategy is supported by the mathematics of the model, but little experimental evidence is available on the practical consequences, so a warning is provided. A violation of the computed decompression ceiling triggers an alarm, which self cancels if the diver immediately descends below the ceiling. The Ratio iX3M will provide a warning if the indicated stop depth is violated by 0.1 m or more, but it is not clear how the algorithm is affected. In many cases the user manual does not provide information on how sensitive the algorithm is to precise depth, what penalties may be incurred by minor discrepancies, or what theoretical basis justifies the penalty. Over-reaction to stop depth violation puts the diver at an unnecessary disadvantage if there is an urgent need to surface, and no computer can guarantee freedom from decompression sickness even if the displayed surfacing profile is followed exactly.

More complex functionality is accompanied by more complex code, which is more likely to include undiscovered errors, particularly in non-critical functions, where testing may not be so rigorous. The trend is to be able to download firmware updates online to eliminate bugs as they are found and corrected. In earlier computers, some errors required factory recall.

There are circumstances in which a lockout on surfacing is not an appropriate, helpful, safe or reasonable response. If a cave diver surfaces inside a cave, and the computer locks out following a violation, the diver may be in a position where they have no option but to make the return dive without the information the computer could reasonably be expected to provide, putting the diver at considerably more severe risk than strictly necessary. This is a very rare occurrence, but it is a failure that a backup computer with similar functionality cannot mitigate. Depending on circumstances and the specific computer, it may be possible to set it to gauge mode, which would at least provide depth and time data.

=== Redundancy ===
A single computer shared between divers cannot accurately record the dive profile of the second diver, and therefore their decompression status will be unreliable and probably inaccurate. In the event of computer malfunction during a dive, the buddy's computer record may be the best available estimate of decompression status, and has been used as a guide for decompression in emergencies. Further diving after an ascent in these conditions exposes the diver to an unknown additional risk. Some divers carry a backup computer to allow for this possibility. The backup computer will carry the full recent pressure exposure history, and continued diving after a malfunction of one computer will not affect risk provided that the second computer continues to function correctly. It is also possible to set the conservatism on the backup computer to allow for the fastest acceptable ascent in case of an emergency, with the primary computer set for the diver's preferred risk level if this feature is not available on the computer. Under normal circumstances the primary computer will be used to control the ascent.

== Management of difficult conditions ==
In water conditions when it is difficult to maintain a consistently accurate depth, such as for shallow stops in large swells, some computers will allow the diver to decompress at a deeper than optimum depth where the risk of violating the decompression ceiling is reduced, but this will require linger decompression and more breathing gas. If the computer can indicate a decompression ceiling and floor, the diver can remain between them and know that effective and reasonably safe decompression is happening, though it may be inefficient. By decompressing at a depth where it is practicable to remain below the ceiling in the largest waves, safety is enhanced, and by keeping as far above the floor as allows by this strategy, efficiency is enhanced.

== Ethical questions ==
Some questions have been raised in the diving community regarding the ethics of certain practices by dive computer manufacturers. In the continued absence of normative standards for the design and testing of dive computers, these have remained open, and the choice must be made by the user based on the information made available by the manufacturer, which may not be much.

- Is it ethical for the computer manufacturer to not divulge the details of the decompression model used in a dive computer? How does this affect the ability of the diver to make an informed acceptance of risk? What are the criteria for effectiveness and risk acceptability?
- What is an acceptable level of risk? It is generally recognised that with the current technology and understanding of decompression physiology, a zero risk algorithm is not reasonably practicable. Different sectors of the diving community accept different levels of decompression risk, and within the recreational sector, different divers accept different levels of risk.
- What would be an acceptable validation protocol? Should dive computers be validated on human subjects using Doppler monitoring? If so, what types of profile should be used, and how would meaningful rejection criteria be chosen?
- Should validation be done by an independent agency?
- Should the manufacturer be obliged to publish reliability data?
- Is it acceptable to lock out decompression monitoring functionality during a dive in the event of a profile violation, leaving the diver without any indication of a reasonable safe ascent profile at a time when it is most needed?

== History ==
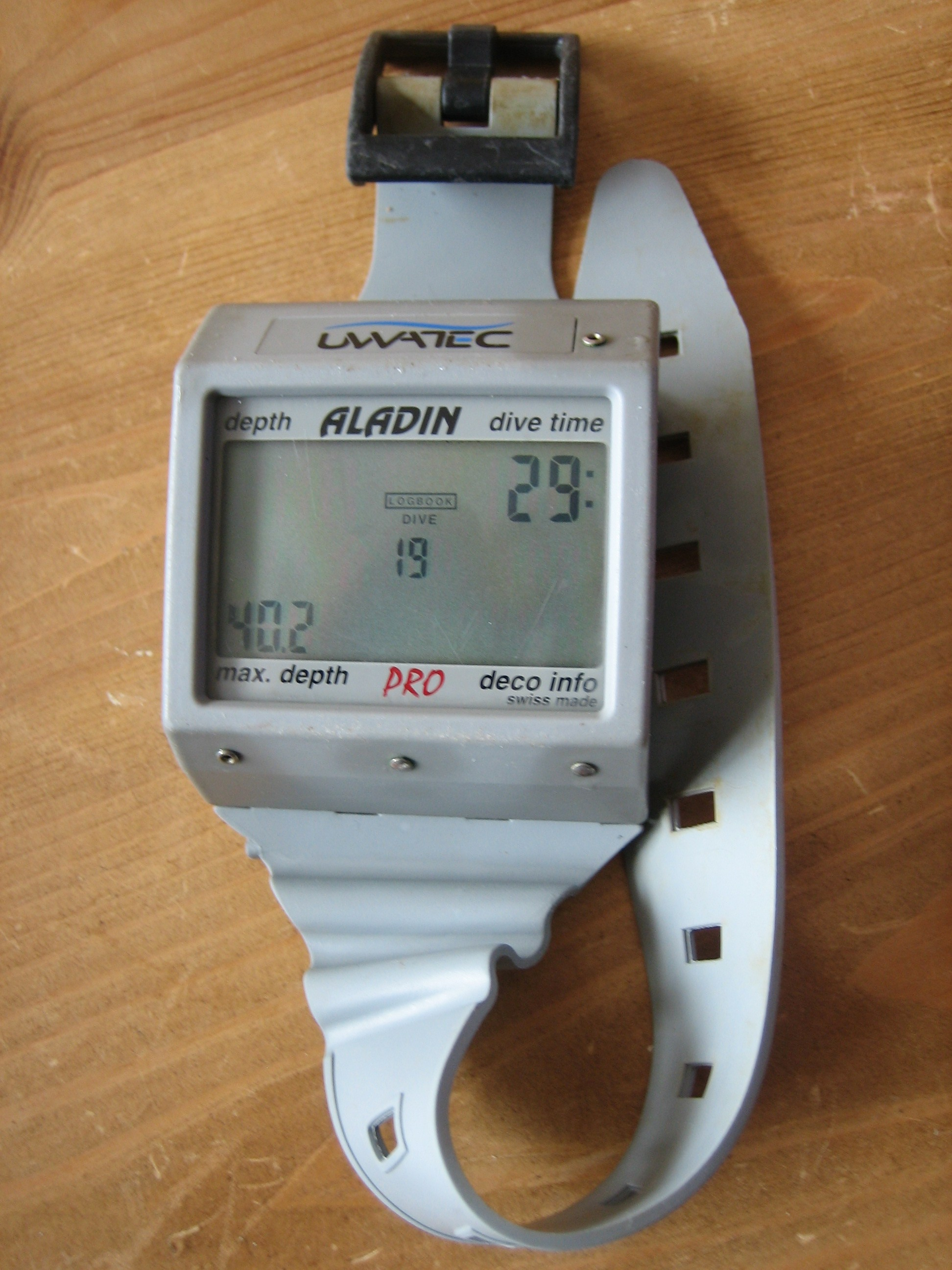
Uwatec Aladin Pro dive computer showing the log of a previous dive

In 1951, the Office of Naval Research funded a project with the Scripps Institution of Oceanography for the theoretical design of a prototype decompression computer. Two years later, two Scripps researchers, Groves and Monk, published a paper specifying the required functionalities for a decompression device to be carried by the diver: It must calculate decompression during a multilevel dive; it must take into account residual nitrogen loading from previous dives; and, based on this information, specify a safe ascent profile with better resolution than decompression tables. They suggested using an electrical analog computer to measure decompression and air consumption.

=== Pneumatic analogues ===
The prototype mechanical analogue Foxboro Decomputer Mark I, was produced by the Foxboro Company in 1955, and evaluated by the US Navy Experimental Diving Unit in 1957. The Mark 1 simulated two tissues using five calibrated porous ceramic flow resistors and five bellows actuators to drive a needle which indicated decompression risk during an ascent by moving towards a red zone on the display dial. The US Navy found the device to be too inconsistent.

The first recreational mechanical analogue dive computer, the "decompression meter" was designed by the Italians De Sanctis and Alinari in 1959 and built by their company named SOS, which also made depth gauges. The decompression meter was distributed directly by SOS and also by scuba diving equipment firms such as Scubapro and Cressi. It was very simple in principle: a waterproof bladder filled with gas inside the casing bled into a smaller chamber through a semi-porous ceramic flow resistor to simulate a single tissue in- and out-gassing. The chamber pressure was measured by a bourdon tube gauge, calibrated to indicate decompression status. The device functioned so poorly that it was eventually nicknamed "bendomatic". though large numbers of divers reportedly found it satisfactory.

In 1965, R. A. Stubbs and D. J. Kidd applied their decompression model to a pneumatic analogue decompression computer, and in 1967 Brian Hills reported development of a pneumatic analogue decompression computer modelling the thermodynamic decompression model. It modelled phase equilibration instead of the more commonly used limited supersaturation criteria and was intended as an instrument for on-site control of decompression of a diver based on real-time output from the device. Hills considered the model to be conservative.

Several mechanical analogue decompression meters were subsequently made, some with several bladders for simulating the effect on various body tissues, but they were sidelined with the arrival of electronic computers. The Canadian DCIEM pneumatic analogue computer of 1962 simulated four tissues, approximating the DCIEM tables of the time. The 1973 GE Decometer by General Electric used semi-permeable silicone membranes instead of ceramic flow resistors, which allowed deeper dives. The Farallon Decomputer of 1975 by Farallon Industries, California simulated two tissues, but produced results very different from the US Navy tables of the time, and was withdrawn a year later.

=== Electrical analogues ===
At the same time as the mechanical simulators, electrical analog simulators were being developed, in which tissues were simulated by a network of resistors and capacitors, but these were found to be unstable with temperature fluctuations, and required calibration before use. They were also bulky and heavy because of the size of the batteries needed. The first analogue electronic decompression meter was the Tracor, completed in 1963 by Texas Research Associates.

=== Digital ===
The first digital dive computer was a laboratory model, the XDC-1, based on a desktop electronic calculator, converted to run a DCIEM four-tissue algorithm by Kidd and Stubbs in 1975. It used pneumofathometer depth input from surface-supplied divers.

From 1976 the diving equipment company Dacor developed and marketed a digital dive computer which used a table lookup based on stored US Navy tables rather than a real-time tissue gas saturation model. The Dacor Dive Computer (DDC), displayed output on light-emitting diodes for: current depth; elapsed dive time; surface interval; maximum depth of the dive; repetitive dive data; ascent rate, with a warning for exceeding 20 metres per minute; warning when no-decompression limit is reached; battery low warning light; and required decompression.

The Canadian company CTF Systems Inc. then developed the XDC-2 or CyberDiver II (1980), which also used table lookup, and the XDC-3, also known as CyberDiverIII, which used microprocessors, measured cylinder pressure using a high-pressure hose, calculated tissue loadings using the Kidd-Stubbs model, and remaining no-stop time. It had an LED matrix display, but was limited by the power supply, as the four 9 V batteries only lasted for four hours and it weighed 1.2 kg. About 700 of the XDC models were sold from 1979 to 1982.

In 1979 the XDC-4 could already be used with mixed gases and different decompression models using a multiprocessor system, but was too expensive to make an impact on the market.

In 1982/1983, the Hans Hass-DecoBrain I, designed by Divetronic AG, a Swiss start-up, became the first decompression diving computer, capable of displaying the information that today's diving computers do. It worked with a stored decompression table. The DecoBrain II was based on Albert A. Bühlmann's 16 compartment (ZH-L12) tissue model, which Jürg Hermann, an electronic engineer, implemented in 1981 on one of Intel's first single-chip microcontrollers as part of his thesis at the Swiss Federal Institute of Technology.

The 1983 Orca Edge was an early example of a dive computer. Designed by Craig Barshinger, Karl Huggins and Paul Heinmiller, the EDGE did not display a decompression plan, but instead showed the ceiling or the so-called "safe-ascent-depth". A drawback was that if the diver was faced by a ceiling, he did not know how long he would have to decompress. The Edge's large, unique display, however, featuring 12 tissue bars permitted an experienced user to make a reasonable estimate of their decompression obligation.

In the 1980s the technology quickly improved. In 1983 the Orca Edge became available as the first commercially viable dive computer. The model was based on the US Navy dive tables but did not calculate a decompression plan. However, production capacity was only one unit a day.

In 1984 the US Navy diving computer (UDC) which was based on a 9 tissue model of Edward D. Thalmann of the Naval Experimental Diving Unit (NEDU), Panama City, who developed the US Navy tables. Divetronic AG completed the UDC development – as it had been started by the chief engineer Kirk Jennings of the Naval Ocean System Center, Hawaii, and Thalmann of the NEDU – by adapting the Deco Brain for US Navy warfare use and for their 9-tissue MK-15 mixed gas model under an R&D contract of the US Navy.

Orca Industries continued to refine their technology with the release of the Skinny-dipper in 1987 to do calculations for repetitive diving. They later released the Delphi computer in 1989 that included calculations for diving at altitude as well as profile recording.

In 1986 the Finnish company, Suunto, released the SME-ML. This computer had a simple design, with all the information on display. It was easy to use and was able to store 10 hours of dives, which could be accessed any time. The SME-ML used a 9 compartment algorithm used for the US Navy tables, with tissues half times from 2.5 to 480 minutes. Battery life was up to 1500 hours, maximum depth 60 m.

In 1987 Swiss company UWATEC entered the market with the Aladin, which was a bulky and fairly rugged grey device with quite a small screen, a maximum depth of 100 metres, and an ascent rate of 10 metres per minute. It stored data for 5 dives and had a user replaceable 3.6 V battery, which lasted for around 800 dives. For some time it was the most commonly seen dive computer, particularly in Europe. Later versions had a battery which had to be changed by the manufacturer and an inaccurate battery charge indicator, but the brand remained popular.

The c1989 Dacor Microbrain Pro Plus claimed to have the first integrated dive planning function, the first EEPROM storing full dive data for the last three dives, basic data for 9999 dives, and recorded maximum depth achieved, cumulative total dive time, and total number of dives. The LCD provides a graphic indication of remaining no-decompression time.

=== General acceptance ===
Even by 1989, the advent of dive computers had not met with what might be considered widespread acceptance. Combined with the general mistrust, at the time, of taking a piece of electronics that your life might depend upon underwater, there were also objections expressed ranging from dive resorts felt that the increased bottom time would upset their boat and meal schedules, to that experienced divers felt that the increased bottom time would, regardless of the claims, result in many more cases of decompression sickness. Understanding the need for clear communication and debate, Michael Lang of the California State University at San Diego and Bill Hamilton of Hamilton Research Ltd. brought together, under the auspices of the American Academy of Underwater Sciences a diverse group that included most of the dive computer designers and manufacturers, some of the best known hyperbaric medicine theorists and practitioners, representatives from the recreational diving agencies, the cave diving community and the scientific diving community.

The basic issue was made clear by Andrew A. Pilmanis in his introductory remarks: "It is apparent that dive computers are here to stay, but are still in the early stages of development. From this perspective, this workshop can begin the process of establishing standard evaluation procedures for assuring safe and effective utilization of dive computers in scientific diving."

After meeting for two days the conferees were still in, "the early stages of development," and the "process of establishing standard evaluation procedures for assuring safe and effective utilization of dive computers in scientific diving," had not really begun. University of Rhode Island diving safety officer Phillip Sharkey and Orca Edge's Director of Research and Development, Paul Heinmiller, prepared a 12-point proposal that they invited the diving safety officers in attendance to discuss at an evening closed meeting. Those attending included Jim Stewart (Scripps Institution of Oceanography), Lee Somers (University of Michigan), Mark Flahan (San Diego State University), Woody Southerland (Duke University), John Heine (Moss Landing Marine Laboratories), Glen Egstrom (University of California, Los Angeles), John Duffy (California Department of Fish and Game), and James Corry (United States Secret Service). Over the course of several hours the suggestion prepared by Sharkey and Heinmiller was edited and turned into the following 13 recommendations:

1. Only those makes and models of dive computers specifically approved by the Diving Control Board may be used.
2. Any diver desiring the approval to use a dive computer as a means of determining decompression status must apply to the Diving Control Board, complete an appropriate practical training session and pass a written examination.
3. Each diver relying on a dive computer to plan dives and indicate or determine decompression status must have his own unit.
4. On any given dive, both divers in the buddy pair must follow the most conservative dive computer.
5. If the dive computer fails at any time during the dive, the dive must be terminated and appropriate surfacing procedures should be initiated immediately.
6. A diver should not dive for 18 hours before activating a dive computer to use it to control his diving.
7. Once the dive computer is in use, it must not be switched off until it indicates complete outgassing has occurred or 18 hours have elapsed, whichever comes first.
8. When using a dive computer, non-emergency ascents are to be at the rate specified for the make and model of dive computer being used.
9. Ascent rates shall not exceed 40 fsw/min in the last 60 fsw.
10. Whenever practical, divers using a dive computer should make a stop between 10 and 30 feet for 5 minutes, especially for dives below 60 fsw.
11. Only 1 dive on the dive computer in which the NDL of the tables or dive computer has been exceeded may be made in any 18-hour period.
12. Repetitive and multi-level diving procedures should start the dive, or series of dives, at the maximum planned depth, followed by subsequent dives of shallower exposures.
13. Multiple deep dives require special consideration.

As recorded in "Session 9: General discussion and concluding remarks:"

Mike Lang next lead the group discussion to reach consensus on the guidelines for use of dive computers. These 13 points had been thoroughly discussed and compiled the night before, so that most of the additional comments were for clarification and precision. The following items are the guidelines for use of dive computers for the scientific diving community. It was again reinforced that almost all of these guidelines were also applicable to the diving community at large.

After the AAUS workshop most opposition to dive computers dissipated, numerous new models were introduced, the technology dramatically improved and dive computers soon became standard scuba diving equipment. Over time, some of the 13 recommendations became irrelevant, as more recent dive computers continue running while they have battery power, and switching them off mainly turns off the display.

=== Further development ===
In c. 1996, Mares marketed a dive computer with spoken audio output, produced by Benemec Oy of Finland, and the Thamann VVAL 18 decompression model was tested in the Cochran dive computer.

In c. 2000, HydroSpace Engineering developed the HS Explorer, a Trimix computer with optional P_{O_{2}} monitoring and twin decompression algorithms, Bühlmann, and the first full RGBM implementation.

In 2001, the US Navy approved the use of Cochran NAVY decompression computer with the VVAL 18 Thalmann algorithm for Special Warfare operations.

In 2008, the Underwater Digital Interface (UDI) was released to the market. This dive computer, based on the RGBM model, includes a digital compass, an underwater communication system that enables divers to transmit preset text messages, and a distress signal with homing capabilities.

By 2010 the use of dive computers for decompression status tracking was virtually ubiquitous among recreational divers and widespread in scientific diving. 50 models by 14 manufacturers were available in the UK.

The variety and number of additional functions available has increased over the years.

Thalmann algorithm (VVAL-18) is available to the US Navy in computers from Shearwater Research, since the closure of Cochran Undersea Technology after the death of its founder.

Wristwatch format housings have become common. They are compact and can also serve as daily wear wristwatches, but the display area is limited by the size of the unit and may be difficult to read for divers with poorer vision, and control buttons are necessarily small and may be awkward to use with thick gloves. Battery life may also be limited by the available volume.

==== Smartphone housings ====
Waterproof housings are marketed which use a smartphone, depth and temperature sensors and a decompression app to provide dive computer capabilities. Depth ratings vary, but 80msw is claimed for some. Bluetooth wireless communications have been used for communication between the smartphone and external sensors. Specifications may not mention any validation tests or compliance with standards relevant to diving equipment. A variety of features are offered based on the smartphone platform. Android and iOS operating systems are supported.

==== Future development ====
Lang and Angelini (2009) call for development of decompression models which more closely emulate the personal physiology of the individual diver, to provide a closer match between the predicted decompression obligation and the real decompression obligation.

Hardware developments are expected in three categories. Improvements associated with developments in consumer electronics, additional monitoring built into the algorithm, and developments from decompression physiology research. The market for dive computers is very small in comparison with mobile phones, so it is expected that developments will trickle down. High resolution color displays are already becoming common in high end dive computers, and can provide a wider range of more user-friendly interface options, including labels and massages in a language of choice, colour coding choices appropriate for colour blindness, Optional font size and positioning of data on the screen, graphic display of data where appropriate, such as dive profile, and uploadable site maps.

GPS is already available, but only works at the surface. EPIRB technology may be useful to some divers, but is currently expensive, and requires a lot of power for transmission. Heart rate monitoring is technically available, but of questionable practical value with current decompression models. Oxygen saturation and skin temperature are feasible but also not currently useful. Doppler bubble detection is not yet practical for diver wear, and of debatable value for decompression stress prediction and analysis underwater, as most bubbles develop at the surface after the dive.

== Validation ==
Verification is the determination that a dive computer functions correctly, in that it correctly executes its programmed algorithm, and this would be a standard quality assurance procedure by the manufacturer, while validation confirms that the algorithm provides the accepted level of risk. The risk of the decompression algorithms programmed into dive computers may be assessed in several ways, including tests on human subjects, monitored pilot programs, comparison to dive profiles with known decompression sickness risk, and comparison to risk models.

=== Performance of dive computers exposed to profiles with known human subject results. ===
Studies (2004) at the University of Southern California's Catalina hyperbaric chamber ran dive computers against a group of dive profiles that have been tested with human subjects, or have a large number of operational dives on record.

The dive computers were immersed in water inside the chamber and the profiles were run. Remaining no-decompression times, or required total decompression times, were recorded from each computer 1 min prior to departure from each depth in the profile. The results for a 40 msw "low risk" multi-level no-decompression dive from the PADI/DSAT RDP test series provided a range of 26 min of no-decompression time remaining to 15 min of required decompression time for the computers tested. The computers which indicated required decompression may be regarded as conservative: following the decompression profile of a conservative algorithm or setting will expose the diver to a reduced risk of decompression, but the magnitude of the reduction is unknown. Conversely the more aggressive indications of the computers showing a considerable amount of remaining no-decompression time will expose the diver to a greater risk than the fairly conservative PADI/DSAT schedule, of unknown magnitude.

=== Comparative assessment and validation ===
Evaluation of decompression algorithms could be done without the need for tests on human subjects by establishing a set of previously tested dive profiles with a known risk of decompression sickness. This could provide a rudimentary baseline for dive computer comparisons. As of 2012, the accuracy of temperature and depth measurements from computers may lack consistency between models making this type of research difficult.

==== Accuracy of displayed data ====
European standard "EN13319:2000 Diving accessories - Depth gauges and combined depth and time measuring devices - Functional and safety requirements, test methods", specifies functional and safety requirements and accuracy standards for depth and time measurement in dive computers and other instruments measuring water depth by ambient pressure. It does not apply to any other data which may be displayed or used by the instrument.

Temperature data are used to correct pressure sensor output, which is non-linear with temperature, and are not as important as pressure for the decompression algorithm, so a lesser level of accuracy is required. A study published in 2021 examined the response time, accuracy and precision of water temperature measurement computers and found that 9 of 12 models were accurate within 0.5 °C given sufficient time for the temperature to stabilise, using downloaded data from open water and wet chamber dives in fresh- and seawater. High ambient air temperature is known to affect temperature profiles for several minutes into a dive, depending on the location of the pressure sensor, as the heat transfer from computer body to the water is slowed by factors such as poor thermal conductivity of a plastic housing, internal heat generation, and mounting the sensor orifice in contact with the insulation of the diving suit. An edge-mounted sensor in a small metal housing will follow ambient temperature changes much faster than a base mounted sensor in a large, thick-walled plastic housing, while both provide accurate pressure signals.

An earlier survey of 49 models of decompression computer published in 2012 showed a wide range of error in displayed depth and temperature. Temperature measurement is primarily used to ensure correct processing of the depth transducer signal, so measuring the temperature of the pressure transducer is appropriate, and the slow response to external ambient temperature is not relevant to this function, provided that the pressure signal is correctly processed.

Nearly all of the tested computers recorded depths greater than the actual pressure would indicate, and were markedly inaccurate (up to 5%) for some of the computers. There was considerable variability in permitted no-stop bottom times, but for square profile exposures, the computer-generated values tended to be more conservative than tables at depths shallower than 30 m, but less conservative at 30–50 m. The no-stop limits generated by the computers were compared to the no-stop limits of the DCIEM and RNPL tables. Variation from applied depth pressure measured in a decompression chamber, where accuracy of pressure measurement instrumentation is periodically calibrated to fairly high precision (±0.25%), showed errors from -0.5 to +2m, with a tendency to increase with depth.

There appeared to be a tendency for models of computer by the same manufacturer to display a similar variance in displayed pressure, which the researchers interpreted as suggesting that the offset could be a deliberate design criterion, but could also be an artifact of using similar components and software by the manufacturer. The importance of these errors for decompression purposes is unknown, as ambient pressure, which is measured directly, but not displayed, is used for decompression calculations. Depth is calculated as a function of pressure, and does not take into account density variations in the water column. Actual linear distance below the surface is more relevant for scientific measurement, while displayed depth is more relevant to forensic examinations of dive computers, and for divers using the computer in gauge mode with standard decompression tables, which are usually set up for pressure in feet or metres of water column .

== Ergonomic considerations ==
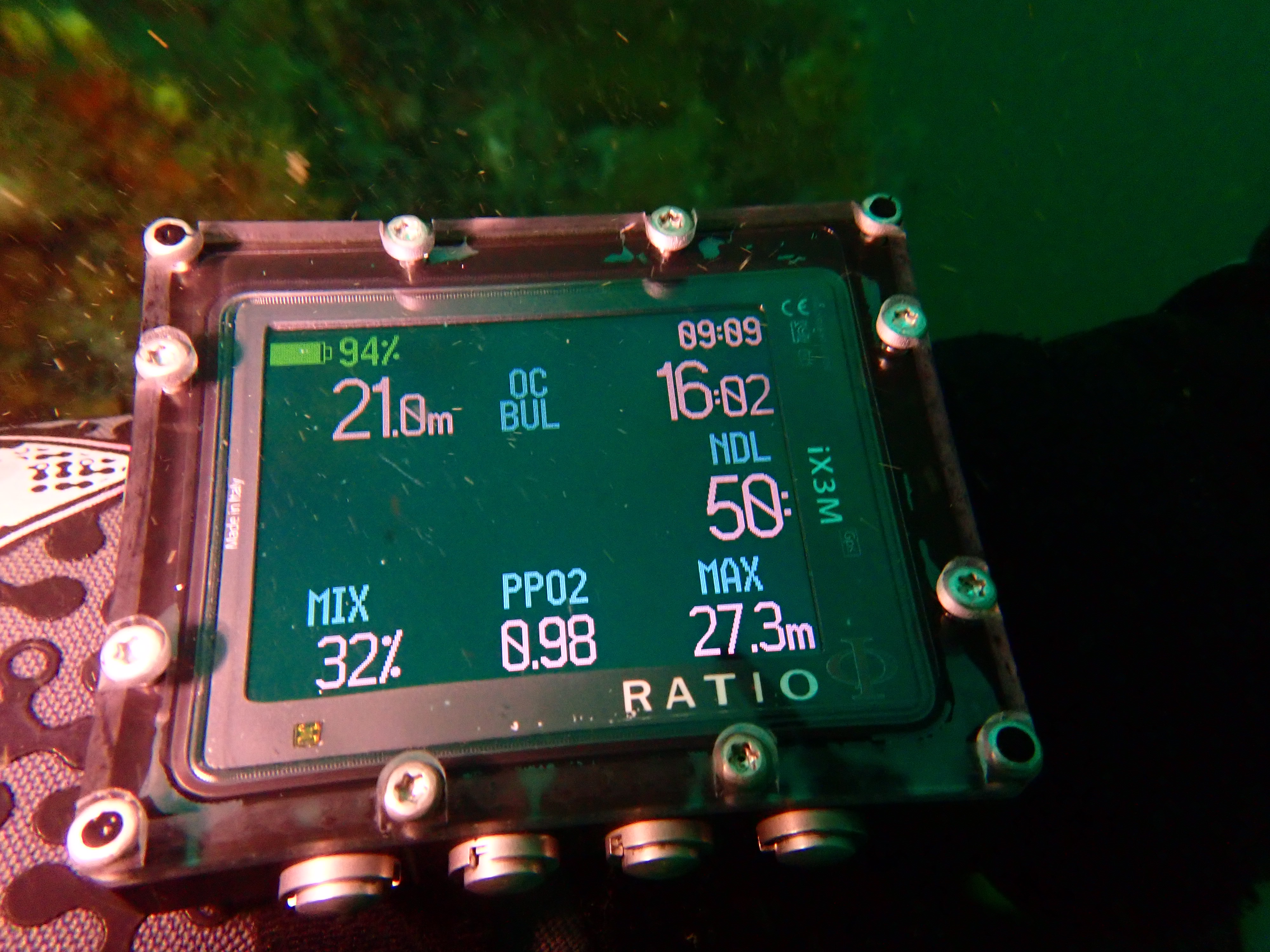
Ratio iX3M gps dive computer normal display during dive

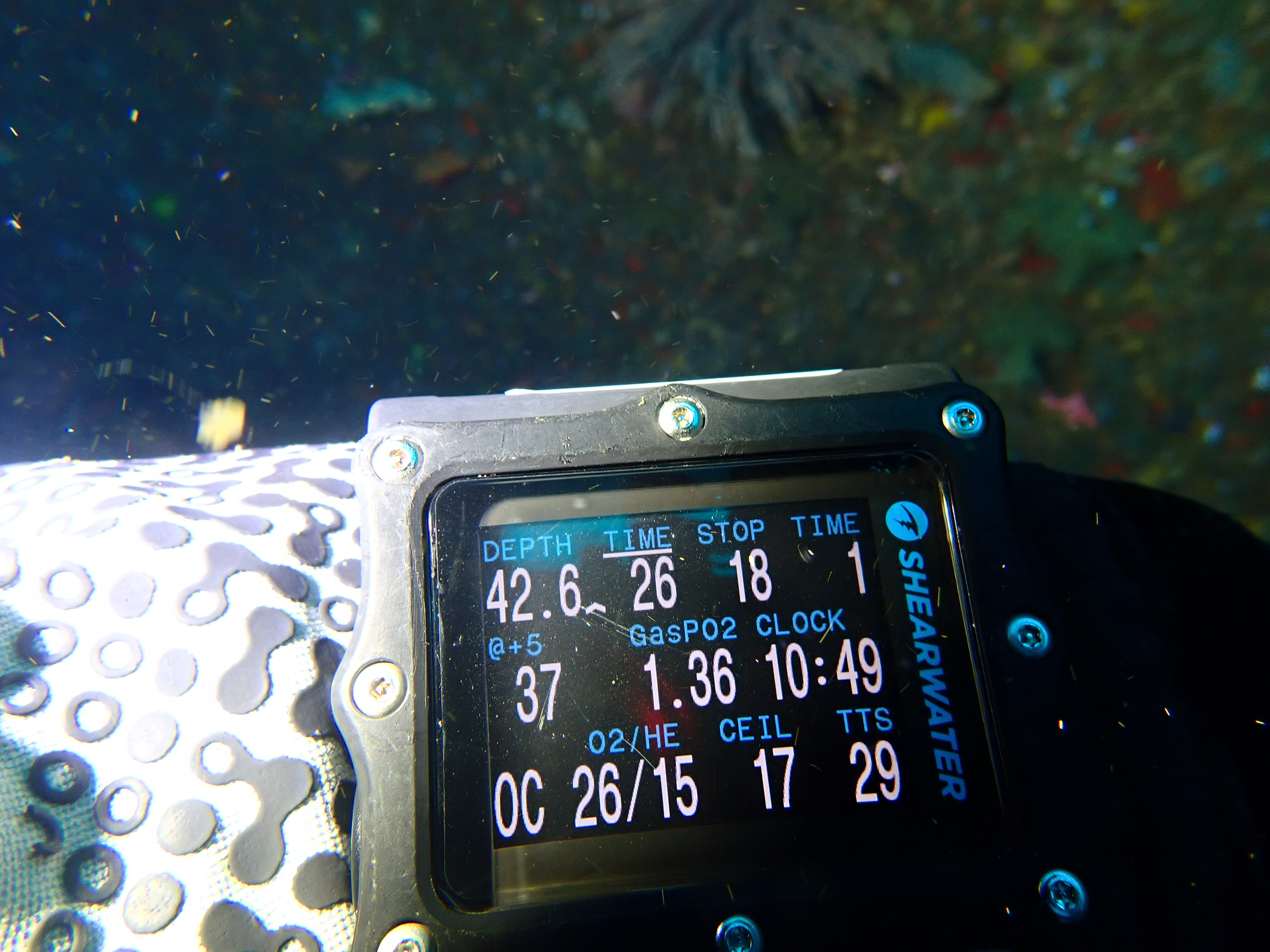
Shearwater Perdix showing decompression obligations just before ascent on main screen layout

If the diver cannot effectively use the dive computer during a dive it is of no value except as a dive profile recorder. To effectively use the device the ergonomic aspects of the display and control input system (User interface) are important. Misunderstanding of the displayed data and inability to make necessary inputs can lead to life-threatening problems underwater. The operating manual is not available for reference during the dive, so either the diver must learn and practice the use of the specific unit before using it in complex situations, or the operation must be sufficiently intuitive that it can be worked out on the spot, by a diver who may be under stress at the time. Although several manufacturers claim that their units are simple and intuitive to operate, the number of functions, layout of the display, and sequence of button pressing is markedly different between different manufacturers, and even between different models by the same manufacturer. Number of buttons that may need to be pressed during a dive generally varies between two and four, and the layout and sequence of pressing buttons can become complicated. Experience using one model may be of little use preparing the diver to use a different model, and a significant relearning stage may be necessary. Previous experience may even be a disadvantage when the knowledge of one system may confuse the diver who needs to use a different system under stress. Both technical and ergonomic aspects of the dive computer are important for diver safety. Underwater legibility of the display may vary significantly with underwater conditions and the visual acuity of the individual diver. If labels identifying output data and menu choices are not legible at the time they are needed, they do not help. Legibility is strongly influenced by text size, font, brightness, and contrast. Colour can help in recognition of meaning, such as distinguishing between normal and abnormal conditions, but may detract from legibility, particularly for the colour-blind, and a blinking display demands attention to a warning or alarm, but is distracting from other information.

Several criteria have been identified as important ergonomic considerations:

- Ease of reading critical data, including:
  - No decompression time remaining
  - Current depth
  - Elapsed time since the beginning of the dive (run time)
  - If decompression is required, total time to surface, and depth of the next required decompression stop
  - If gas integration is the only way to monitor the remaining gas supply, the remaining gas pressure.
- Ease of reading and accessibility of the primary screen display. Misinterpretation of the display data can be very dangerous. This can occur for various reasons, including lack of identifying information and poor legibility. Ease of returning to the primary screen from alternative display options is also important. If the diver cannot remember how to get back to the screen which displays safety-critical information, their safety may be severely compromised. Divers may not fully understand and remember the operating instructions, as they tend to be complicated. Under stress complicated procedures are more likely to be forgotten or misapplied. Alternative screens may revert to the primary screen automatically after a time sufficient to read the auxiliary information. Critical information may be displayed on all stable screen options during a dive as a compromise. It is preferable for the data to be visible by default, and not require illumination by a dive light or internal lighting that needs a button pressed to light up. Some manufacturers offer similar functionality in optional compact and larger screen formats.
- Ease of use and understanding of the user manual.
- Ease of reading and clarity of meaning of warnings. These may be provided by simple symbol displays, by audible alarms, flashing displays, text messages, colour coding or combinations of these. Alarms should clearly indicate the problem, so the diver need not waste time trying to work out what is at fault, and can take immediate action to correct the problem. To this end, descriptive text indicating the problem and the recommended action to be taken is more useful and less confusing than a flashing symbol, though a flashing symbol can be good for drawing attention to the problem.
- Head-up displays can be used to provide the diver with a view of critical information which is always visible. These can be mounted on the mask, or on the mouthpiece assembly. Head-up displays require special near-eye 0ptics to allow correct focus on the display. In conditions of very low visibility, a head-up display has the advantage that the diver's ability to see the display is not affected by turbidity. It also lets the diver monitor all displayed dive data without interrupting their work.
- For more technical applications, ease of making gas switches to both preset gas mixes carried by the diver, and non-preset mixes, which might be supplied by another diver.
- Ease of accessing alternative screen data, much of which is not directly important for safety, but may affect the success of the dive in other ways, like use of compass features.
- Legibility of the display under various ambient conditions of visibility and lighting, and for varying visual acuity of the diver, which may include fogging of the mask or even loss of the mask.

=== Form factor ===
There are four commonly used form factors:

- Wristwach housings are compact, light, and may be used as daily use wristwatches. Freediving computers are usually in this format, but it is also popular for scuba.
- Cylindrical housings (puck) fit into diving instrument consoles and have optional wrist mounts except where they are air-integrated with a high pressure hose. The shape and size were determined by the common sizes of analog mechanical diving instruments (depth gauges and pressure gauges) which commonly used console mounts. Most are slightly larger than the nominal 2 inches (51 mm) face diameter.
- Rectangular housings (brick) are intended for wrist mounting, using a larger screen size for easier-to-read displays or more information on the screen. They often have a curved back surface to conform more closely with the surface of the forearm for stability, and two straps for security. There are also asymmetrically styled housings with similar characteristics and features. This may be the most popular format for technical diving. There is no standard size or shape.
- Smartphone housings are sized to accept a reasonable range of phone models and are therefore necessarily larger. The display area is inherently large, and display quality depends on the smartphone used. They may be wrist mounted or carried in the hand with a safety lanyard, particularly if they are also used as cameras.

== Manufacturing and performance standards ==
Standards relevant in the European Union:

- When a dive computer is integrated with a cylinder pressure gauge it has to be certified according to EN250 (respiratory equipment) and the PPE Directive becomes mandatory.
- The EMC directive (89/336/EEC) for electrical appliances, requires that they do not cause electrical interference, and are not susceptible to it.
- EN13319:2000: covers equipment for measuring depth and time, but explicitly excludes monitoring of decompression obligation.
- PPE Directive 89/686/EEC is intended to harmonize products to provide a high level of protection and safety, but dive computers are not listed in the directive under section 3.11 - additional requirements specific to particular risks – safety devices for diving equipment. Several other classes of diving equipment such as respiratory equipment (EN250:2002), buoyancy compensators (EN1809:1999), combined buoyancy and rescue devices (EN12628:2001), respiratory equipment for compressed nitrox and oxygen (EN13949:2004), rebreathers (EN14143:2004), and dry suits (EN14225-2:2005) fall under the PPE directive.)
- The general quality assurance standard ISO9001.

== Operational considerations for use in commercial diving operations ==
Their acceptance of dive computers for use in commercial diving varies between countries and industrial sectors. Validation criteria have been a major obstacle to acceptance of diving computers for commercial diving. Millions of recreational and scientific dives each year are successful and without incident, but the use of dive computers remains prohibited for commercial diving operations in several jurisdictions because the algorithms used cannot be guaranteed safe to use, in many cases are not disclosed in verifiable detail, and the legislative bodies who can authorise their use have a duty of care to workers. Manufacturers do not want to invest in the expensive and tedious process of official validation, while regulatory bodies will not accept dive computers until a validation process has been documented.

Verification is the determination that a dive computer functions correctly, in that it correctly executes its programmed algorithm, while validation confirms that the algorithm provides the accepted level of risk.

If the decompression algorithm used in a series of dive computers is considered to be acceptable for commercial diving operations, with or without additional usage guidelines, then there are operational issues that need to be considered:

1. The computer must be simple to operate or it will probably not be accepted.
2. The display must be easily read in low visibility conditions to be effectively used.
3. The display must be clear and easily understood, even if the diver is influenced by nitrogen narcosis, to reduce the risk of confusion and poor decisions.
4. The decompression algorithm should be adjustable to more conservative settings, as some divers may want a more conservative profile.
5. The dive computer must be easy to download to collect profile data so that analysis of dives can be done.

== Rebreather control and monitor hardware ==
The functional requirements of an electronically controlled closed circuit rebreather are very similar to the functions and capacity of technical diving decompression computers for rebreather diving, and some rebreather manufacturers use dive computer hardware repackaged by dive computer manufacturers as rebreather control and monitoring units. The software may be modified to provide the display of multiple oxygen cell readings, warnings, alarms and voting logic, and the dive computer hardware may be hard-wired to the rebreather control hardware.

=== Communications protocols ===
The communications system used by Shearwater Research for connectivity between dive computers and rebreathers is DiveCAN, which has a physical connectivity standard and a communication protocol based on the CAN bus industry standard.

== Bottom timer ==
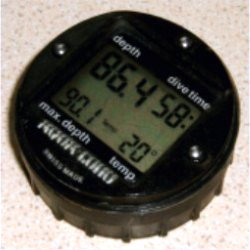
Bottom timer

A bottom timer, or dive timer, is an electronic device that records the depth at specific time intervals during a dive, and displays current depth, maximum depth, elapsed time and may also display water temperature and average depth. It does not calculate decompression data at all, and is equivalent to gauge mode on many dive computers.

== Storage, transport and maintenance ==
Most dive computers mainly require adequate washing in fresh water and storage in a cool place out of direct sunlight. Longer soaking in fresh water will usually remove salt deposits that may have crystallised in crevices and in the weave of woven fabric straps, but may use more battery power if shallow immersion activates the computer. Activation depth may vary. They should be protected from impact and contact with chemicals which may damage the casing or seals, and from impact and abrasion to the faceplate. If contaminated with oils or grease, this should be removed by scrubbing with a soft brush using a mild detergent. When transported by air, some computers may be switched to airplane mode. Most dive computers are not user serviceable beyond washing, and in some cases, battery replacement.

== Training and certification ==
The approach to training in the use of a dive computer has changed over time. Originally a dive computer was considered special equipment, and the user was responsible for ensuring that they knew how to use it correctly. The AAUS recommendations from the Dive Computer Workshop of 1989 stipulated passing a written exam before scientific divers should be allowed to use personal dive computers in the field. As they became more common, and the usual way of monitoring the dive, minimal instruction on the use of the computer became integrated into dive training as part of the training for a given certification. This is complicated by the probability of more than one model being used by the learners on a given course, except where the school supplied the computers. Since late 2009, it has been an option for PADI Open Water Diver courses, to do a dive computer section in place of learning to use the dive tables. A booklet is supplied on how to use and select a dive computer. SDI was an early adopter of use of dive computers in training from entry level, and offers the course named SDI Computer Diver intended for divers certified through agencies which used traditional dive tables for planning during their training, and have not been formally trained in the use of dive computers.

In 2024 Scuba Schools International (SSI) announced a training program called "Computer Diver" which covers the basic functionality, setup and operation of dive computers. The training is considered appropriate for ages 10 and up, to a maximum depth of 30 m, and is expected to take 3 to 6 hours.

Similarly, PADI schools offer a course called "Computer Diving Specialist", which has a prerequisite certification of PADI Open Water Diver, the minimum level certification for autonomous recreational diving. The course comprises up to three classroom sessions and an optional open water dive for a beginner with a minimum experience of four open water dives limited to 18 metres to become a specialist by PADI standards.

There is a wide variation in detail of operation for each manufacturer, and in many cases between the models available from each manufacturer, so only the basic information and principles are portable between models, and significant relearning is required to be able to use a new computer safely. This situation could be improved by an internationally accepted standard for user interfaces for critical functions. The information required to safely operate most dive computers is normally extracted from the owner's manual by the user, and in many cases from videos freely available on the internet. In most such situations there is no competence assessment, and the user finds out by trial and error, while diving, what they have failed to understand or remember.

== Value ==
Along with delayed surface marker buoys, dive computers stood out in a 2018 survey of European recreational divers and diving service providers as being perceived as highly important safety equipment.

== See also ==
- Bühlmann decompression algorithm – Mathematical model of tissue inert gas uptake and release with pressure change
- Decompression (diving) – Pressure reduction and its effects during ascent from depth
- Decompression equipment – Equipment used by divers to facilitate decompression
- Decompression practice – Techniques and procedures for safe decompression of divers
- Decompression theory – Theoretical modelling of decompression physiology
- Depth gauge – Instrument that indicates depth below a reference surface
- Diving safety – Risk management of underwater diving activities
- Human factors in diving equipment design – Influence of the interaction between the user and the equipment on design
- Metre sea water – Unit of pressure equal to one tenth of a bar
- Reduced gradient bubble model – Decompression algorithm
- Thalmann algorithm – Mathematical model for diver decompression
- Varying Permeability Model – Decompression model and algorithm based on bubble physics
- US Navy decompression models and tables – Basis for the published decompression tables and algorithms
