= Avelo diving system =

Scuba set with variable-density buoyancy control

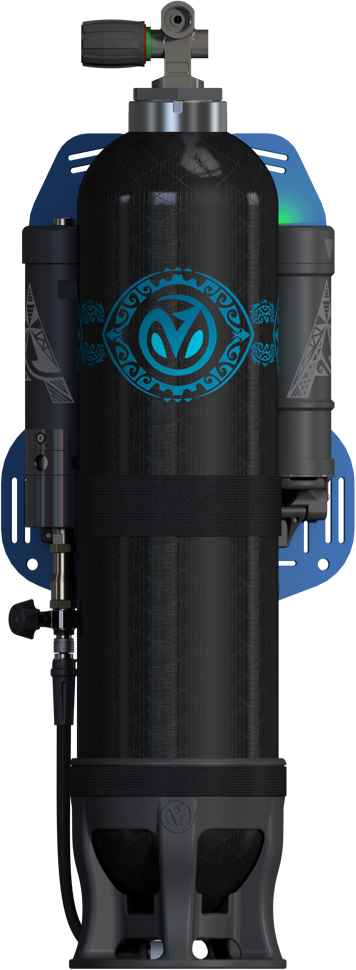
The Avelo System

The Avelo diving system is a single cylinder, back-mounted scuba set with variable density buoyancy control. The gas cylinder is a carbon fibre over aluminium liner filament wound pressure vessel with a charging pressure of 300 bar and a gas capacity of about 106 cubic feet of atmospheric pressure air or recreational nitrox. The fully charged set is slightly buoyant and lighter than the equivalent scuba set using a metal cylinder and inflatable buoyancy compensator. Buoyancy of the set is adjustable by injecting ambient water into the cylinder to increase density and releasing it to reduce density. Less ballast weight is needed by the diver. Any 300 bar rated scuba regulator can be used.

== Purpose ==
The system was developed by engineer and diving instructor Aviad Cahana as a way to reduce the mass of recreational scuba equipment, as an ergonomic improvement, and to reduce the task loading and risk in buoyancy control. Poor buoyancy control and loss of buoyancy control have been implicated in a significant proportion of fatal scuba diving incidents.

== Operating principle ==
A buoyancy compensator (BC) works by adjusting the average density of the diver and their attached equipment to be greater than, equal to, or less than the density of the diving medium. This can be done in either of two ways:

- Variable volume or ambient pressure: The volume of a flexible device can be varied by adding or removing ambient pressure gas, which has a relatively low density. This method is unstable, as a deviation from neutral buoyancy depth causes the buoyancy to alter in a way that will induce further deviation from neutral buoyancy depth in a positive feedback loop. The diver must continuously adjust buoyancy and depth to remain in control. or
- Variable density or constant volume: The density of a rigid container can be varied by compressing or expanding the internal gas by adding or removing incompressible diving medium ballast, which has a relatively high density. The buoyancy of the container is unaffected by depth changes and is stable.

As of 2021, the overwhelming majority of BCs are variable volume types, inflated by gas at ambient pressure, but the variable density type is used in the Avelo diving system.

== Components ==
The Avelo system comprises two major components, which are firmly connected together when in use. The manufacturers call them the "hydrotank" and "jetpack". A conventional two-stage open circuit scuba regulator with gas pressure monitoring is also needed to deliver the gas to the diver at ambient pressure on demand. The hydrotank is fitted with a 300 bar rated scuba cylinder valve. Dry weight of the system is 36 pounds (16 kg) (or 45 pounds (20 kg))

=== "Hydrotank" ===
The Avelo system eliminates the conventional variable volume buoyancy compensator bladder in favour of a variable density buoyancy compensator in the form of a constant volume breathing gas storage container referred to as the "hydrotank" which is a high pressure, carbon fibre wound composite pressure vessel on an aluminium liner which contains a tough flexible bladder to separate the stored breathing gas from the ballast water, both of which are carried in the hydrotank. Gas charging pressure is about 300 bar, and the safe working pressure is considerably higher. The tanks are tested to 16,000 pounds per square inch (1,100 bar). The top end of the hydrotank has a 300 bar rated DIN scuba cylinder valve for regulator attachment, and the internal bladder is connected to this inside the cylinder so that the breathing gas is stored inside the bladder, which is constrained by the cylinder walls, so that it is not under high stress when under pressure. Water can be injected into the hydrotank on the outside of the bladder through a fitting at the bottom end of the cylinder by a high pressure pump to increase the mass, and thereby the average density of the hydrotank. Since the bladder is elastic, the pressure of the water in the hydrotank is effectively the same as the gas pressure.

The hydrotank is a relatively long, narrow hemispherical ended cylinder, which is an efficient form factor for keeping the mass low. There are two sizes. The standard 10 litre hydrotank contains approximately 106 cubic feet of breathing gas by American measure at 300 bars (4,400 psi) and the smaller 8 litre version is shorter to better accommodate smaller divers, and will contain 80% of the free gas content at the same pressure as the larger tank.

=== "Jetpack" ===
The "jetpack" refers to the backplate, harness, high-pressure water pump and battery pack assembly used to carry the hydrotank and operate the buoyancy control by adding ambient water to the interior of the hydrotank to decrease it's buoyancy, and release the water back to the surroundings to increase buoyancy after return to the surface.

The pump is a high pressure positive displacement pump with a low delivery volume, capable of producing enough pressure to inject water into the hydrotank against the internal gas pressure. When the pump stops, the water does not flow back through it, and must be manually released by a bypass valve. The system is protected from overpressurisation by a pressure relief valve.

Power for the pump is provided from a rechargeable battery pack. This can be swapped out at the dive site for a fully charged pack between dives, and is usually sufficient for a day's worth of dives. When switched on the pump will run for a limited time before automatically switching off, or can be switched off manually.

== Diver weighting ==
Since the buoyancy is controlled by reducing buoyancy of the diver system using ambient water, less ballast weight is required. In some cases, with a low volume diving suit, the diver may not require any additional ballast.

There are places on the hydrotank and jetpack where weights can be secured if necessary, a weight belt can be worn, or weight pockets can be fitted to the harness straps for ditchable weights or trim weights.

== Operational procedure ==
The system starts the dive at nominal charging pressure and slightly positive buoyancy, with no water in the cylinder. The diver is positively buoyant at this stage, and activates the pump to add water ballast to the cylinder until neutral or slightly negative, allowing descent by finning downward. During descent a wetsuit will compress, reducing buoyancy by the volume reduction of the suit, and a dry suit will also compress. The diver will compensate for dry suit compression in the usual way by minimal inflation to avoid suit squeeze. There should be no need to adjust water ballast during descent.

At depth, the diver should still be approximately neutral, or slightly negative, to an extent where control of lung volume can comfortably compensate. Dive depth variations should not affect buoyancy sufficiently for depth of breathing to not comfortably compensate. As the dive progresses and gas is used up, the diver will become slightly lighter, and when it is noticeable that depth of breathing is no longer comfortably compensating, an addition of water to the cylinder will be done to correct the buoyancy, and this may be sufficient for the rest of the dive. A second adjustment may be desirable near the end of the dive. Ascent is by swimming upwards at neutral buoyancy. Dry suit buoyancy will be controlled in the standard way by allowing the expanding gas to escape through the shoulder dump valve. Wet suit buoyancy may not change sufficiently to require action, or may need a small water addition at the safety stop.

On surfacing, the diver will manually dump the water in the cylinder to achieve maximum positive buoyancy, and reduce the weight of the equipment to facilitate exit from the water.

=== Amount of water used for ballast ===
The total mass of air or nitrox that can be filled into the standard 10 litre cylinder is approximately 10/1000m^{3} x 300 x 1.2kg/m^{3} = 3.6kg. This is the theoretical maximum buoyancy change that might need compensation during a dive, if the diver uses up all the available gas. If the diver is about 2kg positive before the dive, an additional 2kg would have to be added to the cylinder to achieve neutral buoyancy at the start of descent, and this added to 3.6kg is 5.6kg, a bit more than half the volume of the cylinder. This can be considered an extreme situation. The implication is that a reasonable amount of bailout or decompression gas carried in a sling cylinder can be compensated by the remaining cylinder volume. Although the Avelo system is currently marketed as recreational, no decompression stops diving equipment, it remains possible for a contingency to cause the diver to use up or lose all the gas, or need to share with a buddy, and divers who choose to carry bailout can do so within the capabilities of the equipment.

== Safety ==
The Avelo system was developed with the intention of improving scuba safety in two ways. Firstly it reduces the mass of the equipment that must be carried by the diver out of the water, which is an ergonomic improvement that reduces the risk of injury due to carrying heavy weights. It also reduces task loading relating to buoyancy control throughout the dive, allowing the diver to concentrate on other matters, and facilitating safer and more controlled ascents and descents, particularly by less skilled divers. In this way it indirectly reduces the risk of barotrauma and decompression illness due to uncontrolled ascents and descents.

=== Failure modes ===
- Pump failure: The pump could fail due to mechanical problems or battery failure. In either case the effect is that no more water can be injected and the unit will very slowly become more buoyant as gas is consumed. The dive can be terminated by a normal ascent at near-neutral buoyancy, by swimming towards the surface. If the diver was maintaining neutral buoyancy before the failure, normal safety stops will be possible. If this occurs before initial descent, the diver will remain buoyant and not be able to descend in the first place. Expansion of a thick wetsuit during ascent from a deep dive may leave the diver a bit buoyant at the end of the ascent, and dry suit expansion during ascent must be managed by dumping gas in the usual way.
- Loss of ballast water: Ballast water could be lost by a leak in the dump valve or injection hose. A small leak can be compensated by adding more water. A complete failure of hose or valve will make the diver slightly positively buoyant, and they will float upwards at a moderate rate, which should be controllable by finning downwards, or by dumping gas from a dry suit. In a no-stop dive the ascent should be controllable and less of a problem than loss of a weight belt.
- Water overfill: This could happen if the pump switch sticks in the on position. The overpressure valve will dump water if the pressure gets too high, and the excess water can be manually dumped. Filling is quite slow, so this is a gradually developing problem.
- Bladder failure: Extremely unlikely, and in tests, without noticeable immediate consequence. Eventually there may be some leakage of water into the air storage space, and it is possible that some may get into the regulator first stage, causing temporary wet breathing gas while steeply inverted and a need to service the regulator and replace the bladder. There is no pressure differential between the inside and outside of the bladder to drive leakage either way. When dumping water at the surface after a dive, some air will also escape, which will inform the diver of the problem.

== Maintenance ==
Maintenance is similar to that recommended for other open circuit scuba equipment. The pump must be run in fresh water to rinse the interior after a dive, but the cylinder does not need to be rinsed inside. The cylinder requires hydrostatic testing and visual inspection as for other diving cylinders, the bladder must be replaced every five years or if it fails an inspection, and the battery pack must be rinsed in fresh water and recharged after use. The harness and cylinder should be washed down with fresh water after use as for other scuba sets.

== Monitoring the breathing gas ==
Gas pressure can be monitored during the dive using a standard analog submersible pressure gauge or an air-integrated dive computer, in the same way that it would be monitored for a regular scuba set. There is an increase in pressure at the start of the dive when water is injected to achieve neutral buoyancy, and that peak pressure is used as the reference pressure for rule of thirds or other gas use strategies. The volume of gas in the cylinder will decrease slightly when water is injected, along with the pressure increase, and this should be taken into account. It is usually a small proportion of the initial volume.

== Avelo mode on dive computers ==
An optional mode for assessing real time buoyancy status for a diver using the Avelo diving system buoyancy compensation is available on a small number of Shearwater Research (Tern TX, Teric, Peregrine TX, or Perdix 2) and Scubapro (G2C) dive computers via firmware downloads. As of April 2025 this feature was available on Shearwater Teric wrist computers and Scubapro console computers. Real time cylinder pressure input is required, but may be via a high pressure hose (G2C) or a wireless pressure sensor (Teric). The software estimates the magnitude of positive or negative buoyancy based on the volume of ballast water added to the hydrocyinder during the dive after a neutral buoyancy state has been achieved and confirmed by the diver. Displayed information is intended to advise the diver on when to adjust the ballast so that lung volume will be sufficient for fine buoyancy control. Other user input allows wetsuit compression to be factored in.

== Training and certification ==
A one-day, two-dive Recreational Avelo Diver (RAD) specialty course is required before divers can use or rent the equipment independently. This is mainly to familiarise the diver with the equipment and the different approach to buoyancy control that is necessary.

== Research, design and manufacture ==
Development, design and manufacture are controlled by Avelo Labs. In 2024 Shearwater Research and Scubapro developed dive computer upgrades for a selected subset of their products called Avelo mode, and in late 2024 Shearwater announced a R&D project to develop the Avelo Jetpack.

== Availability and price ==
As of October 2024, the units were only available for rental at specific dive centres. As of May 2025, Avelo units are available for purchase through select authorized dealers and dive centers. The cost is in the order of 4000USD. Availability is expected to expand as adoption increases.
