= Outline of the United States Virgin Islands =

Overview of and topical guide to the United States Virgin Islands

The Flag of the United States Virgin Islands

The Seal of the United States Virgin Islands

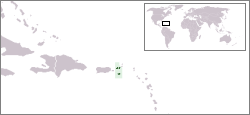
The location of the United States Virgin Islands

The following outline is provided as an overview of and topical guide to the United States Virgin Islands:

United States Virgin Islands – unincorporated organized territory of the United States of America located in the western portion of the Virgin Islands Archipelago in the Caribbean Sea. The Virgin Islands are part of the Leeward Islands of the Lesser Antilles. The British Virgin Islands comprises the eastern portion of the archipelago.

The U.S. Virgin Islands consist of the main islands of Saint Croix, Saint John and Saint Thomas, along with the much smaller but historically distinct Water Island, and many other surrounding minor islands. The total land area of the territory is 346.36 km^{2} (133.73 sq mi). As of the 2000 census the population was 108,612.

Three of the main islands have nicknames often used by locals: "Rock City" (St. Thomas), "Love City" (St. John), and "Twin City" (St. Croix).

== General reference ==
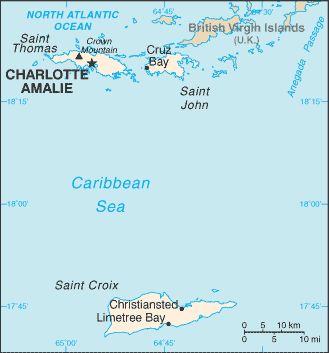
An enlargeable map of the Territory of the United States Virgin Islands

- Pronunciation:
- Common English country names: The United States Virgin Islands or the U.S. Virgin Islands
- Official English country name: The Territory of the United States Virgin Islands
- Common endonym(s):
- Official endonym(s):
- Adjectival(s): Virgin Island
- Demonym(s): Virgin Islander
- Etymology: Name of the United States Virgin Islands
- ISO country codes: VI, VIR, 850
- ISO region codes: See ISO 3166-2:VI
- Internet country code top-level domain: .vi

== Geography of the United States Virgin Islands ==
Geography of the United States Virgin Islands

- The United States Virgin Islands are: an insular area of the United States
- Location:
  - Northern Hemisphere and Western Hemisphere
    - North America (though not on the mainland)
  - Atlantic Ocean
    - Caribbean (West Indies)
      - Antilles
        - Lesser Antilles
          - Leeward Islands
            - Virgin Islands archipelago
  - Time zone: Eastern Caribbean Time (UTC-04)
  - Extreme points of the United States Virgin Islands
    - High: Crown Mountain 474 m (1,555 ft)
    - Low: Caribbean Sea 0 m
  - Land boundaries: none
  - Coastline: 188 km
- Population of the United States Virgin Islands:
- Area of the United States Virgin Islands:
- Atlas of the United States Virgin Islands

=== Environment of the United States Virgin Islands ===
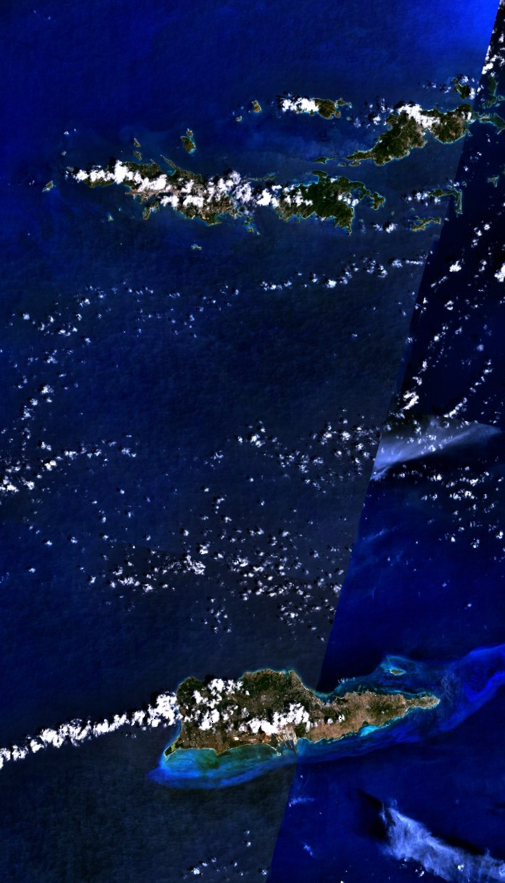
An enlargeable satellite image of United States Virgin Islands

- Climate of the United States Virgin Islands
- Renewable energy in the United States Virgin Islands
- Geology of the United States Virgin Islands
- Protected areas of the United States Virgin Islands
  - Biosphere reserves in the United States Virgin Islands
  - National parks of the United States Virgin Islands
- Superfund sites in the United States Virgin Islands
- Wildlife of the United States Virgin Islands
  - Fauna of the United States Virgin Islands
    - Birds of the United States Virgin Islands
    - Mammals of the United States Virgin Islands

==== Natural geographic features of the United States Virgin Islands ====
- Fjords of the United States Virgin Islands
- Islands of the United States Virgin Islands
- Lakes of the United States Virgin Islands
- Mountains of the United States Virgin Islands
  - Volcanoes in the United States Virgin Islands
- Rivers of the United States Virgin Islands
  - Waterfalls of the United States Virgin Islands
- Valleys of the United States Virgin Islands
- World Heritage Sites in the United States Virgin Islands: None

=== Regions of the United States Virgin Islands ===
Regions of the United States Virgin Islands

==== Ecoregions of the United States Virgin Islands ====
List of ecoregions in the United States Virgin Islands

- Ecoregions in the United States Virgin Islands

==== Administrative divisions of the United States Virgin Islands ====
Administrative divisions of the United States Virgin Islands

- Provinces of the United States Virgin Islands
  - Districts of the United States Virgin Islands
    - Municipalities of the United States Virgin Islands

===== Provinces of the United States Virgin Islands =====
Provinces of the United States Virgin Islands

===== Districts of the United States Virgin Islands =====
Districts of the United States Virgin Islands

===== Municipalities of the United States Virgin Islands =====
Municipalities of the United States Virgin Islands

- Capital of the United States Virgin Islands: Charlotte Amalie
- Cities of the United States Virgin Islands

=== Demography of the United States Virgin Islands ===
Demographics of the United States Virgin Islands

== Government and politics of the United States Virgin Islands ==
Politics of the United States Virgin Islands

- Form of government: presidential representative democratic dependency
- Capital of the United States Virgin Islands: Charlotte Amalie
- Elections in the United States Virgin Islands
- Political parties in the United States Virgin Islands

=== Branches of the government of the United States Virgin Islands ===
- Government of the United States Virgin Islands
  - List of governors of the United States Virgin Islands

==== Legislative branch of the government of the United States Virgin Islands ====
- Parliament of the United States Virgin Islands (bicameral)
  - Upper house: Senate of the United States Virgin Islands
    - List of United States Virgin Islands senators
  - Lower house: House of Commons of the United States Virgin Islands

==== Judicial branch of the government of the United States Virgin Islands ====
Court system of the United States Virgin Islands

- Supreme Court of the United States Virgin Islands

=== Foreign relations of the United States Virgin Islands ===
Foreign relations of the United States Virgin Islands

- Diplomatic missions in the United States Virgin Islands
- Diplomatic missions of the United States Virgin Islands

==== International organization membership ====
The Territory of the United States Virgin Islands is a member of:

- International Olympic Committee (IOC)
- Universal Postal Union (UPU)
- World Federation of Trade Unions (WFTU)

=== Law and order in the United States Virgin Islands ===
Law of the United States Virgin Islands

- Cannabis in the United States Virgin Islands
- Constitution of the United States Virgin Islands
- Crime in the United States Virgin Islands
- Human rights in the United States Virgin Islands
  - LGBT rights in the United States Virgin Islands
  - Freedom of religion in the United States Virgin Islands
- Law enforcement in the United States Virgin Islands

=== Military of the United States Virgin Islands ===
Military of the United States Virgin Islands

- Command
  - Commander-in-chief:
    - Ministry of Defence of the United States Virgin Islands
- Forces
  - Army of the United States Virgin Islands
  - Navy of the United States Virgin Islands
  - Air Force of the United States Virgin Islands
  - Special forces of the United States Virgin Islands
- Military history of the United States Virgin Islands
- Military ranks of the United States Virgin Islands

=== Local government in the United States Virgin Islands ===
Local government in the United States Virgin Islands

== History of the United States Virgin Islands ==
History of the United States Virgin Islands

- Timeline of the history of the United States Virgin Islands
- Current events of the United States Virgin Islands

=== History of the United States Virgin Islands, by period ===
- Indigenous peoples of the Virgin Islands
  - Ciboney
  - Arawaks
  - Caribs
- First European contact, 1493–1519
  On November 14, 1493, a Spanish fleet under the command of Christoffa Corombo (Christopher Columbus) lands on a large inhabited island which he names Santa Cruz (Holy Cross, now Saint Croix). Corombo then visits and names San Tomas (Saint Thomas) and San Juan (Saint John). Corombo names the archipelago Santa Ursula y las Once Mil Vírgenes (Saint Ursula and her 11,000 virgins, now the Virgin Islands).
- Viceroyalty of New Spain, (1519–1650)-1821
- French West Indies, 1650–1733
  - France wrests Saint Croix from Spain, 1650
  - Knights Hospitaller acquire Saint Croix from France, 1660
  - France reacquires Saint Croix from Knights Hospitaller, 1665
  - Denmark purchases Saint Croix from France, 1733
- Danish West Indies, 1657–1917
  - British occupation, 1801–1802
  - British occupation, 1807–1815
  - World War I, June 28, 1914 – November 11, 1918
    - United States purchases Danish West Indies from Denmark on January 17, 1917
- Unorganized U.S. territory of the Virgin Islands, March 31, 1917 – June 22, 1936
  - United States enters World War I on April 6, 1917
- Territory of the Virgin Islands of the United States since June 22, 1936
  - Organic Act of the Virgin Islands of the United States of June 22, 1936
  - World War II, September 1, 1939 – September 2, 1945
    - United States enters Second World War on December 8, 1941
  - Cold War, March 5, 1946 – December 25, 1991
  - Korean War, June 25, 1950 – July 27, 1953
  - Revised Organic Act of the Virgin Islands of the United States of July 22, 1954
  - Virgin Islands National Park established on August 2, 1956
  - Vietnam War, September 26, 1959 – April 30, 1975
  - Persian Gulf War, August 2, 1990 – February 28, 1991
  - Hurricane Marilyn, 1995
  - Attacks on the United States on September 11, 2001
  - Afghanistan War, since October 7, 2001
  - Iraq War, since March 20, 2003

== Culture of the United States Virgin Islands ==
Culture of the United States Virgin Islands

- Architecture of the United States Virgin Islands
- Cuisine of the United States Virgin Islands
- Festivals in the United States Virgin Islands
- Languages of the United States Virgin Islands
- Media in the United States Virgin Islands
- National symbols of the United States Virgin Islands
  - Coat of arms of the United States Virgin Islands
  - Flag of the United States Virgin Islands
  - National anthem of the United States Virgin Islands
- People of the United States Virgin Islands
  - List of people from the United States Virgin Islands
  - List of United States Virgin Islands suffragists
- Public holidays in the United States Virgin Islands
- Records of the United States Virgin Islands
- Religion in the United States Virgin Islands
  - Christianity in the United States Virgin Islands
  - Hinduism in the United States Virgin Islands
  - Islam in the United States Virgin Islands
  - Judaism in the United States Virgin Islands
  - Sikhism in the United States Virgin Islands
- World Heritage Sites in the United States Virgin Islands: None

=== Art in the United States Virgin Islands ===
- Art in the United States Virgin Islands
- Cinema of the United States Virgin Islands
- Literature of the United States Virgin Islands
- Music of the United States Virgin Islands
- Television in the United States Virgin Islands
- Theatre in the United States Virgin Islands

=== Sports in the United States Virgin Islands ===
Sports in the United States Virgin Islands

- Football in the United States Virgin Islands

== Economy and infrastructure of the United States Virgin Islands ==
Economy of the United States Virgin Islands

- Economic rank, by nominal GDP (2007):
- Agriculture in the United States Virgin Islands
- Banking in the United States Virgin Islands
  - National Bank of the United States Virgin Islands
- Communications in the United States Virgin Islands
  - Internet in the United States Virgin Islands
- Companies of the United States Virgin Islands
- Currency of the United States Virgin Islands: Dollar
  - ISO 4217: USD
- Energy in the United States Virgin Islands
  - Energy policy of the United States Virgin Islands
  - Oil industry in the United States Virgin Islands
- Mining in the United States Virgin Islands
- Tourism in the United States Virgin Islands
- Transport in the United States Virgin Islands
- the United States Virgin Islands Stock Exchange

== Education in the United States Virgin Islands ==
Education in the United States Virgin Islands

== Infrastructure of the United States Virgin Islands ==
- Health care in the United States Virgin Islands
- Transportation in the United States Virgin Islands
  - Airports in the United States Virgin Islands
  - Rail transport in the United States Virgin Islands
  - Roads in the United States Virgin Islands
- Water supply and sanitation in the United States Virgin Islands

== See also ==
- Topic overview:
  - United States Virgin Islands
  - Index of United States Virgin Islands-related articles
  - Bibliography of the United States Virgin Islands
