= Index of United States Virgin Islands–related articles =

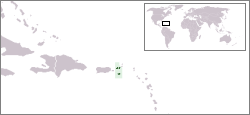
The location of the United States Virgin Islands in the Caribbean Sea

The following is an alphabetical list of articles related to the territory of the United States Virgin Islands.

== 0–9 ==
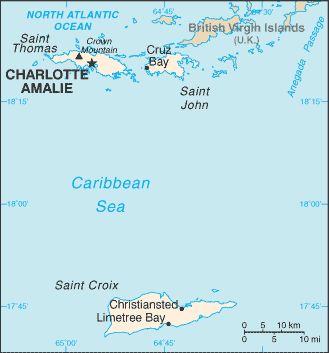
An enlargeable map of the United States Virgin Islands

- .vi – Internet country code top-level domain for the United States Virgin Islands

== A ==
- Agriculture in the United States Virgin Islands
- Airports in the United States Virgin Islands
- Americas
  - North America
    - North Atlantic Ocean
      - West Indies
        - Caribbean Sea
          - Antilles
            - Lesser Antilles
              - Virgin Islands
                - United States Virgin Islands
- Anglo-America
- Antilles
- Arboreta in the United States Virgin Islands
  - commons:Category:Arboreta in the United States Virgin Islands
- Archaeology of the United States Virgin Islands
- Area code 340
- Atlantic Ocean
- Atlas of the United States Virgin Islands

== B ==
- Beaches of the United States Virgin Islands
  - commons:Category:Beaches of the United States Virgin Islands
- Botanical gardens in the United States Virgin Islands
  - commons:Category:Botanical gardens in the United States Virgin Islands
- British Virgin Islands
- Buildings and structures in the United States Virgin Islands
  - commons:Category:Buildings and structures in the United States Virgin Islands

== C ==
- Capital of the United States Virgin Islands: Charlotte Amalie on Saint Thomas
- Caribbean
- Caribbean Sea
- Categories:
  - Category:United States Virgin Islands
    - Category:Buildings and structures in the United States Virgin Islands
    - Category:Communications in the United States Virgin Islands
    - Category:Culture of the United States Virgin Islands
    - Category:Economy of the United States Virgin Islands
    - Category:Education in the United States Virgin Islands
    - Category:Environment of the United States Virgin Islands
    - Category:Geography of the United States Virgin Islands
    - Category:Government of the United States Virgin Islands
    - Category:History of the United States Virgin Islands
    - Category:Military in the United States Virgin Islands
    - Category:Politics of the United States Virgin Islands
    - Category:Society of the United States Virgin Islands
    - Category:Sports in the United States Virgin Islands
    - Category:Transportation in the United States Virgin Islands
    - Category:United States Virgin Islands people
    - Category:United States Virgin Islands stubs
    - Category:United States Virgin Islands-related lists
  - commons:Category:United States Virgin Islands
- Charlotte Amalie on Saint Thomas – Capital of the United States Virgin Islands since 1871
- Christopher Columbus - Cristoforo Colombo - Cristóbal Colón
- Cities in the United States Virgin Islands
  - commons:Category:Cities in the United States Virgin Islands
- Climate of the United States Virgin Islands
- Coat of arms of the United States Virgin Islands
- Colleges and universities in the United States Virgin Islands
  - commons:Category:Universities and colleges in the United States Virgin Islands
- Communications in the United States Virgin Islands
  - Category:Communications in the United States Virgin Islands
    - commons:Category:Communications in the United States Virgin Islands
- Constitution of the United States Virgin Islands
- Coral Bay, United States Virgin Islands
- Cruz Bay, United States Virgin Islands
- Cuisine of the United States Virgin Islands
- Culture of the Virgin Islands

== D ==
- Danish colonization of the Americas
  - Danish West India Company
- Danish West Indies
- Delegates to the United States House of Representatives from U.S. Virgin Islands
- Demographics of the United States Virgin Islands

== E ==
- Economy of the United States Virgin Islands
  - Category:Economy of the United States Virgin Islands
    - commons:Category:Economy of the United States Virgin Islands
- Education in the United States Virgin Islands
  - Category:Education in the United States Virgin Islands
    - commons:Category:Education in the United States Virgin Islands
- Elections in the United States Virgin Islands*Electoral reform in the United States Virgin Islands
- Energy in the United States Virgin Islands
- English language
- Environment of the United States Virgin Islands
  - commons:Category:Environment of the United States Virgin Islands

== F ==
The flag of the United States Virgin Islands

- Flag of the United States Virgin Islands
- Forts in the United States Virgin Islands
  - Fort Christian
  - Category:Forts in the United States Virgin Islands
    - commons:Category:Forts in the United States Virgin Islands

== G ==
The seal of the United States Virgin Islands

- Gardens in the United States Virgin Islands
  - commons:Category:Gardens in the United States Virgin Islands
- Geography of the United States Virgin Islands
  - Category:Geography of the United States Virgin Islands
    - commons:Category:Geography of the United States Virgin Islands
- Government of the United States Virgin Islands website
  - Category:Government of the United States Virgin Islands
    - commons:Category:Government of the United States Virgin Islands
- Governor of the United States Virgin Islands
  - List of governors of the Danish West Indies
  - List of governors of the United States Virgin Islands
- Seal of the United States Virgin Islands
- Gross domestic product

== H ==
- Healthcare in the United States Virgin Islands
- Higher education in the United States Virgin Islands
- Highways of the United States Virgin Islands
- History of the United States Virgin Islands
  - Historical outline of the United States Virgin Islands
    - Category:History of the United States Virgin Islands
      - commons:Category:History of the United States Virgin Islands
- Category:Hotels in the United States Virgin Islands

== I ==
- Images of the United States Virgin Islands
- International Organization for Standardization (ISO)
  - ISO 3166-1 alpha-2 country code for the United States Virgin Islands: VI
  - ISO 3166-1 alpha-3 country code for the United States Virgin Islands: VIR
- Internet in the United States Virgin Islands
- Islands of the United States Virgin Islands:
  - Saint Croix
    - Buck Island (Saint Croix, United States Virgin Islands)
    - Green Cay (Saint Croix, United States Virgin Islands)
    - Ruth Island
  - Saint John, United States Virgin Islands
    - Flanagan Island
    - Waterlemon Cay
  - Saint Thomas, United States Virgin Islands
    - Buck Island (Saint Thomas, United States Virgin Islands)
    - Capella Island
    - Green Cay (Saint Thomas, United States Virgin Islands)
    - Hans Lollik Island
    - Hans Lollik Rock
    - Hassel Island, U.S. Virgin Islands
    - Little Hans Lollik Island
    - Thatch Cay, U.S. Virgin Islands
    - Water Island, U.S. Virgin Islands
  - Barrel of Beef
  - Blinders Rocks
  - Booby Rock
  - Bovoni Cay
  - Calf Rock
  - Carval Rock
  - Cas Cay
  - Cinnamon Cay
  - Cockroach Island (United States Virgin Islands)
  - Coculus Rock
  - Cololoba Cay
  - Congo Cay
  - Cow Rock
  - Cricket Rock
  - Current Rock
  - Dog Island (United States Virgin Islands)
  - Dog Rocks
  - Domkirk Rock
  - Dry Rock
  - Durloe Cays
  - Dut Cheap Cay
  - Fish Cay
  - Flat Cays
  - Gorret Rock
  - Grass Cay
  - Great Saint James Island
  - Henley Cay
  - Inner Brass Island
  - Kalkun Cay
  - Leduck Island
  - Limestone Rock
  - Little Saint James Island
  - Lizard Rocks
  - Lovango Cay
  - Mingo Cay
  - Outer Brass Island
  - Packet Rock
  - Patricia Cay
  - Pelican Cay
  - Perkins Cay
  - Porpoise Rocks
  - Protestant Cay
  - Ramgoat Cay
  - Rata Cay
  - Rotto Cay
  - Rupert Rock
  - Saba Island (United States Virgin Islands)
  - Salt Cay (United States Virgin Islands)
  - Saltwater Money Rock
  - Sandy Point Rock
  - Savana Island
  - Shark Island (United States Virgin Islands)
  - Skipper Jacob Rock
  - Steven Cay
  - Sula Cay
  - The Stragglers
  - Triangle Island
  - Trunk Cay
  - Turtleback Rock
  - Turtledove Cay
  - Two Brothers (United States Virgin Islands)
  - Welk Rocks
  - West Cay
  - Whistling Cay

== L ==
- Landmarks in the United States Virgin Islands
  - commons:Category:Landmarks in the United States Virgin Islands
- Languages of the United States Virgin Islands
- Law enforcement in the United States Virgin Islands
- Leeward Islands
- Lesser Antilles
- Lieutenant Governor of the United States Virgin Islands
- Lists related to the United States Virgin Islands:
  - Historical outline of the United States Virgin Islands
  - List of airports in the United States Virgin Islands
  - List of cities in the United States Virgin Islands
  - List of colleges and universities in the United States Virgin Islands
  - List of countries by GDP (nominal)
  - List of Delegates to the United States House of Representatives from U.S. Virgin Islands
  - List of forts in the United States Virgin Islands
  - List of governors of the Danish West Indies
  - List of governors of the United States Virgin Islands
  - List of highways in the United States Virgin Islands
  - List of islands of the United States Virgin Islands
  - List of newspapers in the United States Virgin Islands
  - List of people from the United States Virgin Islands
  - List of political parties in the United States Virgin Islands
  - List of radio stations in the United States Virgin Islands
  - List of reggae bands from the Virgin Islands
  - List of Registered Historic Places in the United States Virgin Islands
  - List of rivers of the United States Virgin Islands
  - List of Superfund sites in the United States Virgin Islands
  - List of United States Virgin Islands Senators
  - List of United States Virgin Islands-related topics

== M ==
- Military in the United States Virgin Islands
- Minor islands of the United States Virgin Islands
- Music of the Virgin Islands

== N ==
- Natural history of the United States Virgin Islands
  - commons:Category:Natural history of the United States Virgin Islands
- Negerhollands
- Newspapers in the United States Virgin Islands
- North America
- Northern Hemisphere

== P ==
- People from the United States Virgin Islands
  - Category:United States Virgin Islands people
    - commons:Category:People from the United States Virgin Islands
  - United States Virgin Islands people by occupation
- Politics of the United States Virgin Islands
  - Political parties in the United States Virgin Islands
  - Category:Politics of the United States Virgin Islands
    - commons:Category:Politics of the United States Virgin Islands
  - Category:Political parties in the United States Virgin Islands
- Protected areas of the United States Virgin Islands
  - commons:Category:Protected areas of the United States Virgin Islands
- Powerball (multi-jurisdictional lottery)

== R ==
- Radio stations in the United States Virgin Islands
- Reggae in the Virgin Islands
  - Reggae bands from the Virgin Islands
- Registered historic places in the United States Virgin Islands
  - commons:Category:Registered Historic Places in the United States Virgin Islands
- Religion in the United States Virgin Islands
  - commons:Category:Religion in the United States Virgin Islands
- Rivers of the United States Virgin Islands
  - commons:Category:Rivers of the United States Virgin Islands

== S ==
- Saint Croix
- Saint John
- Saint Thomas
- Scouting in the United States Virgin Islands
- Seal of the United States Virgin Islands
- Senators of the United States Virgin Islands
  Category:Settlements in the United States Virgin Islands
- Slavery in the Danish West Indies
- Sports in the United States Virgin Islands
  - commons:Category:Sports in the United States Virgin Islands
  - Category:Soccer venues in the United States Virgin Islands
- Structures in the United States Virgin Islands
  - commons:Category:Buildings and structures in the United States Virgin Islands
- Superfund sites in the United States Virgin Islands

== T ==
- Telecommunications in the United States Virgin Islands
  - Category:Communications in the United States Virgin Islands
    - commons:Category:Communications in the United States Virgin Islands
- Telephone area code 340
- Television stations in the United States Virgin Islands
- United States Virgin Islands website
  - Government of the United States Virgin Islands
    - Category:Government of the United States Virgin Islands
      - commons:Category:Government of the United States Virgin Islands
  - Legislature of the Virgin Islands
    - List of United States Virgin Islands Senators
  - List of United States Virgin Islands Governors
    - List of Governors of the Danish West Indies
  - United States Virgin Islands Police Department
  - United States Virgin Islands Superior Court
  - United States Virgin Islands Supreme Court
  - Category:Government of the United States Virgin Islands
    - commons:Category:Government of the United States Virgin Islands
- Timelines:
  - Historical outline of the United States Virgin Islands
- Topic outline of the United States Virgin Islands
- Tourism in the United States Virgin Islands website
  - commons:Category:Tourism in the United States Virgin Islands
- Transportation on the United States Virgin Islands
  - Category:Transportation in the United States Virgin Islands
    - commons:Category:Transport in the United States Virgin Islands

== U ==
- United States of America
  - District Court of the United States Virgin Islands
  - List of Delegates to the United States House of Representatives from U.S. Virgin Islands
  - Political divisions of the United States
  - United States Court of Appeals for the Third Circuit
  - United States Virgin Islands's At-large congressional district
- United States Virgin Islands website
  - Category:United States Virgin Islands
    - commons:Category:United States Virgin Islands
  - Category:Society of the United States Virgin Islands
    - commons:Category:Society of the United States Virgin Islands
- United States Virgin Islands Police Department
- Universities and colleges in the United States Virgin Islands
  - University of the Virgin Islands
  - commons:Category:Universities and colleges in the United States Virgin Islands

== V ==
- VI – United States Postal Service postal code for the United States Virgin Islands
- Virgin Islander American
- Virgin Islands
  - British Virgin Islands
  - United States Virgin Islands
- Virgin Islands Air National Guard
- Virgin Islands Creole

== W ==
- Water Island
- West Indies
- Western Hemisphere
  Wikimedia
  - commons:Atlas of the United States Virgin Islands
  - commons:Category:United States Virgin Islands
    - commons:Category:Maps of the United States Virgin Islands
  - Wikinews:Category:United States Virgin Islands
    - Wikinews:Portal:United States Virgin Islands
  - Wikipedia Category:United States Virgin Islands
    - Portal:United States Virgin Islands
    - Wikipedia:WikiProject Caribbean/United States Virgin Islands work group
      - Wikipedia:WikiProject Caribbean/United States Virgin Islands work group#Recognized content
      - Wikipedia:WikiProject Caribbean/United States Virgin Islands work group#Participants
    - Wikipedia:WikiProject Topic outline/Drafts/Topic outline of the United States Virgin Islands

== See also ==
- Topic overview:
  - United States Virgin Islands
  - Outline of the United States Virgin Islands
  - Bibliography of the United States Virgin Islands
