= Enighed, United States Virgin Islands =

Enighed, United States Virgin Islands may refer to:

- Enighed, Saint John, United States Virgin Islands
- Enighed, Saint Thomas, United States Virgin Islands
