= Enighed, U.S. Virgin Islands =

Enighed, U.S. Virgin Islands may refer to:

- Enighed, Saint Thomas, U.S. Virgin Islands
- Enighed, Saint John, U.S. Virgin Islands
