= Bibliography of the United States Virgin Islands =

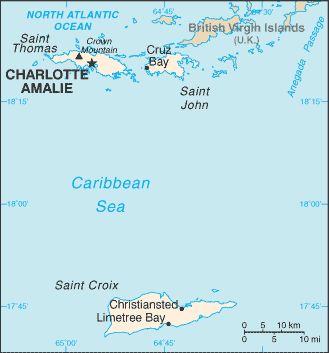
Map of U.S. Virgin Islands18°20′54″N 064°59′01″W

This is an English language bibliography of United States Virgin Islands and its geography, history, inhabitants, culture, biota, etc.

- Acevedo-Rodriguez, Pedro – Flora of St. John U. S. Virgin Islands.
- Acevedo Rodriguez, Pedro – Vines and Climbing Plants of Puerto Rico and the Virgin Islands.
- Acevedo-Rodriguez, Pedro and Mark T. Strong – Monocotyledons and gymnosperms of Puerto Rico and the Virgin Islands.
- Ackerman, James D. – An Orchid Flora of Puerto Rico and the Virgin Islands.
- Alexander, Robert J. – Political Parties of the Americas, Canada, Latin America, and the West Indies, 2 vols.: Anguilla – Grenada and Guadeloupe – Virgin Islands of the United States.
- Armstrong, Douglas V. – Creole Transformation from Slavery to Freedom: Historical Archaeology of the East End Community, St. John, Virgin Islands.
- Beaty, Harry A. – Birds of St. Croix.
- Boyer, William W. – America's Virgin Islands: A History of Human Rights and Wrongs.
- Chipman, Walter A. and Paul E. Thompson – Possibilities for Oyster Culture in Puerto Rico and the Virgin Islands.
- Cochran, Hamilton – These Are the Virgin Islands.
- Cohen, Judah M. – Through the Sands of Time: A History of the Jewish Community of St. Thomas, U. S. Virgin Islands.
- Colon, Julio C. Figueroa – The Scientific Survey of Puerto Rico and the Virgin Islands: An Eighty-Year Reassessment of the Islands' Natural History.
- Comstock, William Phillips – Insects of Puerto Rico and the Virgin Islands Lepidoptera (Suborder) Rhopalocera, (Superfamily) Papillonoidea (True Butterflies), (Superfamily) Hesperioidea (Skippers). Scientific Survey of Porto Rico and the Virgin Islands, Volume XII, Part 4.
- Crocker, John – Bermuda, the Bahamas, Puerto Rico and the Virgin Islands.
- Danforth, Stuart T. – Bird Records from the Virgin Islands.
- Debooy, Theodore and John T. Faris – The Virgin Islands: Our New Possessions and the British Islands.
- Eadie, Hazel Ballance – Lagooned in the Virgin Islands.
- Evans, Luther H. v The Virgin Islands.
- Evans, Luther Harris – The Virgin Islands: From Naval Base to New Deal.
- Gabel, Erik – A Guide to Sources for the History of the Danish West Indies (US Virgin Islands), 1671-1917.
- Harrigan, Norwell – The Inter-Virgin Islands Conference: A Study of a Microstate International Organization.
- Henry, Marguerite – Virgin Islands: In Story and Pictures (Chicago: Albert Whitman and Co., 1946), a children's picture book illustrated by Kurt Wiese.
- Hibben, Thomas and Rafael Pico – Industrial Development of Puerto Rico and the Virgin Islands of the United States: Report of the United States Section, Caribbean Commission, July 1948.
- Highfield, Arnold R. – The French Dialect of St. Thomas, U. S. Virgin Islands: A Descriptive Grammar with Texts and Glossary.
- Hurwitz, Emanuel, Julius Menacker, and Ward Weldon – Educational Imperialism: American School Policy and the U. S. Virgin Islands.
- Jensen, Niklas Thode; Simonsen, Gunvor (2016). "Introduction: The historiography of slavery in the Danish-Norwegian West Indies, c. 1950-2016". Scandinavian Journal of History. 41 (4–5): 475–494. doi:10.1080/03468755.2016.1210880. hdl:109.1.5/469ed487-ad15-4504-a969-8eb9a0ea0d17.
- Jarvis, J. Antonio – Brief History of the Virgin Islands.
- Jarvis, J. Antonio – The Virgin Islands and Their People.
- Leopold, N. F. – Checklist of Birds of Puerto Rico and the Virgin Islands.
- Lewis, Gordon K. – The Virgin Islands: A Caribbean Lilliput.
- Little, Elbert L., Jr. and Frank H. Wadsworth – Common Trees of Puerto Rico and the Virgin Islands.
- Little, E. L., Jr., R. O. Woodbury, and F. H. Wadsworth – Trees of Puerto Rico and the Virgin Islands.
- Little, Elbert L., Jr., Roy O. Woodbury, and Frank H. Wadsworth – Trees of Puerto Rico and the Virgin Islands, Volume 2.
- McGuire, J. W. – Geographic Dictionary of the Virgin Islands of the United States.
- Meyerhoff, H. A. – The Physiography of the Virgin Islands, Culebra and Vieques.
- Miskimen, George W. and Richard M. Bond – Insect Fauna of St. Croix, United States Virgin Islands.
- Nicholls, Robert W. - Old-Time Masquerading in the US Virgin Islands.
- Paiewonsky, Michael – Conquest of Eden, 1493–1515: Other Voyages of Columbus: Guadeloupe, Puerto Rico, Hispaniola, Virgin Islands.
- Proctor, George R. – Ferns of Puerto Rico and the Virgin Islands.
- Raffaele, Herbert A. – A Field Guide to the Birds of Puerto Rico and the Virgin Islands.
- Raffaele, Herbert A. – A Guide to the Birds of Puerto Rico and the Virgin Islands.
- Reck, Daisy - Puerto Rico and the Virgin Islands.
- Savage, Ernest A. – The Libraries of Bermuda, the Bahamas, the British West Indies, British Guiana, British Honduras, Puerto Rico, and the American Virgin Islands: A Report to the Carnegie Corporation of New York.
- Stevenson, John A. – Fungi of Puerto Rico and the American Virgin Islands.
- Svensson, Ole – Three Towns: Conservation and Renewal of Charlotte Amalia, Christiansted, and Frederiksted of the U. S. Virgin Islands.
- Weinstein, Edwin A. – Cultural Aspects of Delusion: A Psychiatric Study of the Virgin Islands.
- Wetmore, Alexander – Scientific Survey of Porto Rico and the Virgin Islands. Vol. IX Part 3: The Birds of Porto Rico and the Virgin Islands: Colymbiformes to Columbiformes.
- Wetmore, Alexander – Scientific Survey of Porto Rico and the Virgin Islands. Vol. IX Part 4: Psittaciformes to Passeriformes.
- Zabriskie, Luther K. – The Virgin Islands of the United States of America.

== See also ==
- Topic overview:
  - United States Virgin Islands
  - Outline of the United States Virgin Islands
  - Index of United States Virgin Islands-related articles
