= Religion in the United States Virgin Islands =

Religions: in the United States Virgin Islands (2010)
1. Protestant (65.5%)
2. Catholic (27.1%)
3. Other Christian (1.80%)
4. Unaffiliated (3.70%)
5. Other religion (1.90%)

Religion in the United States Virgin Islands is varied, though most U.S. Virgin Islanders are Christian. The U.S. Virgin Islands has a history of Judaism and Christianity, with Jews first settling on the islands in 1655. It is estimated that only 5-6% of the population is non-Christian (see chart).

== Christianity ==
As in most Caribbean countries, Christianity is the dominant religion in the U.S. Islands. Protestantism is most prevalent, reflecting the territory's colonial heritage. There is also a strong Catholic presence. Protestants make up 65.5% (Baptist 32%, Pentecostal 12%, Adventist 10%, Episcopalian 9%, other 2.5%) of the total population on the islands. Catholics are 27.1% of the population.

== Judaism ==
Jews began settling in the Danish Virgin Islands in 1655, and by 1796 the first synagogue was inaugurated. In its heyday in the mid-19th century, the Jewish community comprised half of the white population. One of the earliest colonial governors, Gabriel Milan, was a Sephardic Jew, as was the Impressionist artist Camille Pissarro who was born in St Thomas.

Today, there are still Jews living in the Islands. The St. Thomas Synagogue built in 1833, is the second-oldest existing synagogue and longest in continuous use now under the American flag. The synagogue is associated with the Reform Judaism movement. There is also a synagogue Temple B'nai Or at Hermon Hill on St. Croix close to Christiansted.

== Hinduism ==
Hinduism is practiced by the Indo-Caribbean and Indian (mostly Sindhi Hindu) population. The religion first arrived in 1863 with the first indentured laborers from India. There is a Hindu temple in La Grande Princesse, St. Croix, and one in Frenchman's Bay, St. Thomas.

== Islam ==
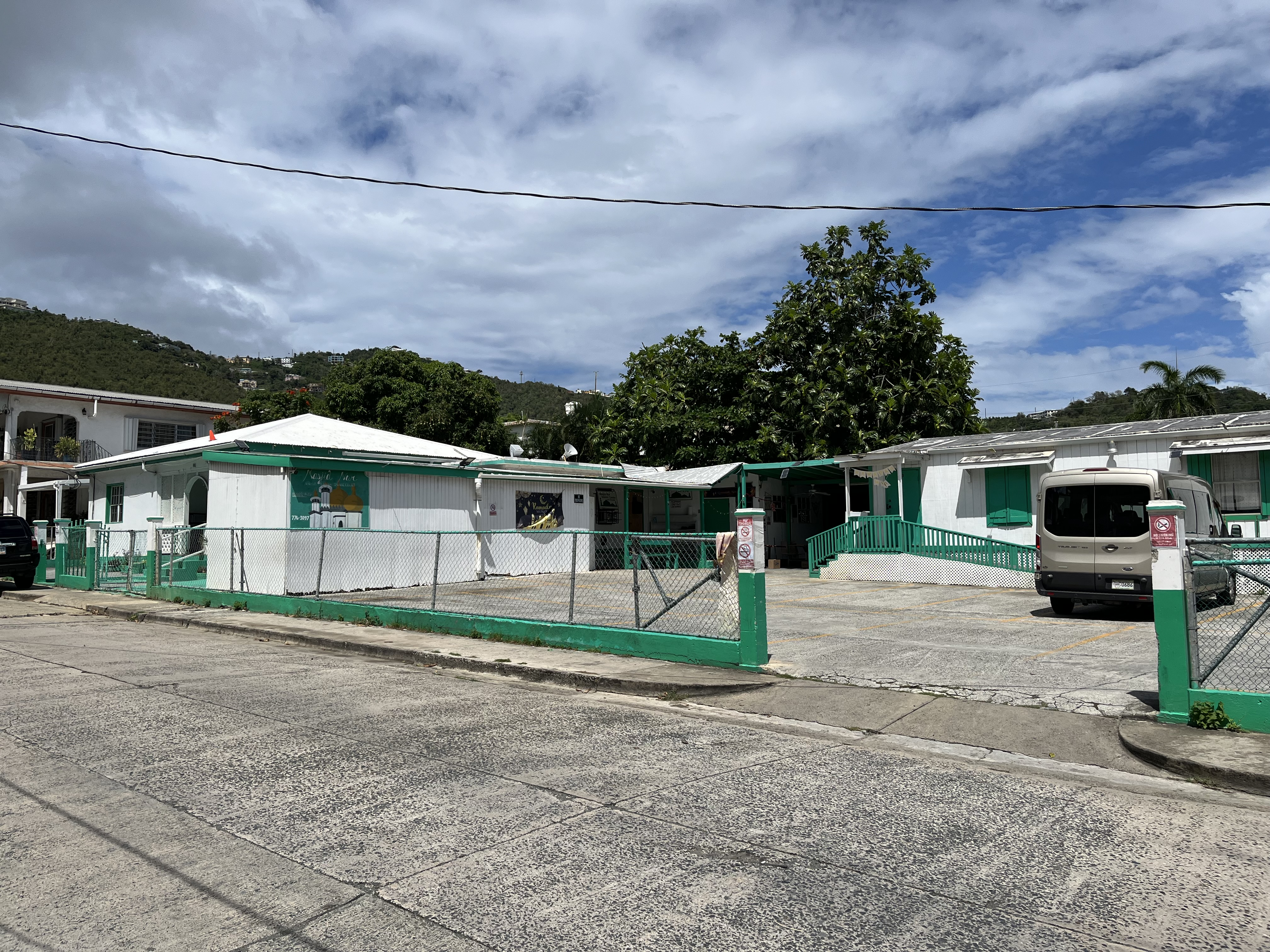
Nur Mosque in Charlotte Amalie, Saint Thomas

Islam in the United States Virgin Islands is a minority religion in the territory.

=== History ===
Islam grew in the territory beginning in the 1960s which mainly came from other Caribbean islands and the Middle East originally for work purposes. They brought their families and eventually settled down on the island. In 1978, the Muhammad Mosque was established as the first mosque in the territory. It was later renamed to Nur Mosque. In 1998 the first Islamic school, IQRA' ACADEMY, was opened, in St. Croix. There were, as of 2011, around 1,200 Muslims in the Islands.

== Bahai ==
The Bahai Faith was established in the Virgin Islands in the 1950s and has had active communities and spiritual assemblies there since that time. The Bahai National Center for the US and British Virgin Islands is located on St. Thomas and local centers are elsewhere. The local communities are administered by local spiritual assemblies and are under the National Spiritual Assembly of the Bahais of the Virgin Islands.

== Buddhism ==
There is a Buddhist temple located on the island of St. Thomas.

== Rastafari ==
As in most of the Caribbean, various forms of Rastafari are practiced on the island.
