= List of colleges and universities in the United States Virgin Islands =

This is a list of colleges and universities in the United States Virgin Islands. This list also includes other educational institutions providing higher education, meaning tertiary, quaternary, and in some cases, post-secondary education.

== Public institutions ==
=== Four-year institutions ===
- University of the Virgin Islands, Charlotte Amalie (Saint Thomas)
- University of the Virgin Islands-Kingshill, Kingshill (Saint Croix)

== See also ==
- Lists of universities and colleges
- List of universities and colleges by country
