= Kalkun Cay, United States Virgin Islands =

Kalkun Cay
- Location in the Caribbean Kalkun Cay, United States Virgin Islands (the Caribbean)

Geography
- Location: Caribbean Sea
- Coordinates: 18°21′01″N 65°03′28″W

Administration
- United States
- Insular area: United States Virgin Islands

Kalkun Cay is a rocky, steep and narrow islet, located in the middle of the Savana Passage in the United States Virgin Islands. It is one mile northeast of Savana Island and one mile west of West Point on the island of Saint Thomas. Kalkun Cay is 73 feet high and covered with underbrush and grass. It is an important habitat of native seabirds.
