= List of newspapers in the United States Virgin Islands =

This is a list of newspapers in the United States Virgin Islands.

== Daily and nondaily newspapers (currently published) ==
- St. Croix Avis – Christiansted, St. Croix
- St. John Tradewinds – St. John
- The Virgin Islands Daily News – Charlotte Amalie, St. Thomas
- The Herald – Christiansted, St. Croix
