= List of lakes of the United States Virgin Islands =

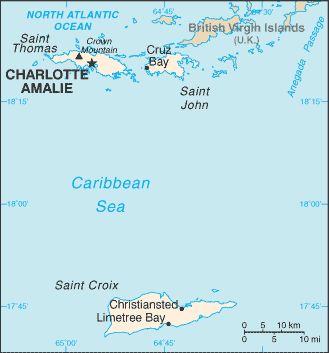
An enlargeable map of the Territory of the United States Virgin Islands

The United States Virgin Islands have no natural lake-like bodies of water. The islands have very few freshwater resources. The U.S. virgin Islands is made up of 4 large islands and about 50 smaller islands. The large islands are: St. Croix, St. Thomas, St. John and Water Island.

The Virgin Islands rely on ocean water desalination to supply fresh water to residents and tourists. In addition all hotels collect rain water on their rooftops. *There are no large rivers or reservoirs in the Virgin Islands.

== Lakes and ponds ==
- Altona Lagoon
- Flamingo Pond
- Fredensborg Pond
- Great Pond
- Southgate Pond
- Southside Pond

== See also ==
- List of rivers of the United States Virgin Islands
