= Electoral reform in the United States Virgin Islands =

Electoral reform in the United States Virgin Islands refers to efforts to change the voting laws in that archipelago. Dwayne A. Callwood called for election reforms to be a priority at the Virgin Islands constitutional convention that would make it easier for ballot initiatives and recalls to be brought to a ballot. As a U.S. territory, the U.S. Virgin Islands are ineligible to become parties to the National Popular Vote Interstate Compact.
