= Crown Mountain (United States Virgin Islands) =

Mountain on Saint Thomas, U.S. Virgin Islands

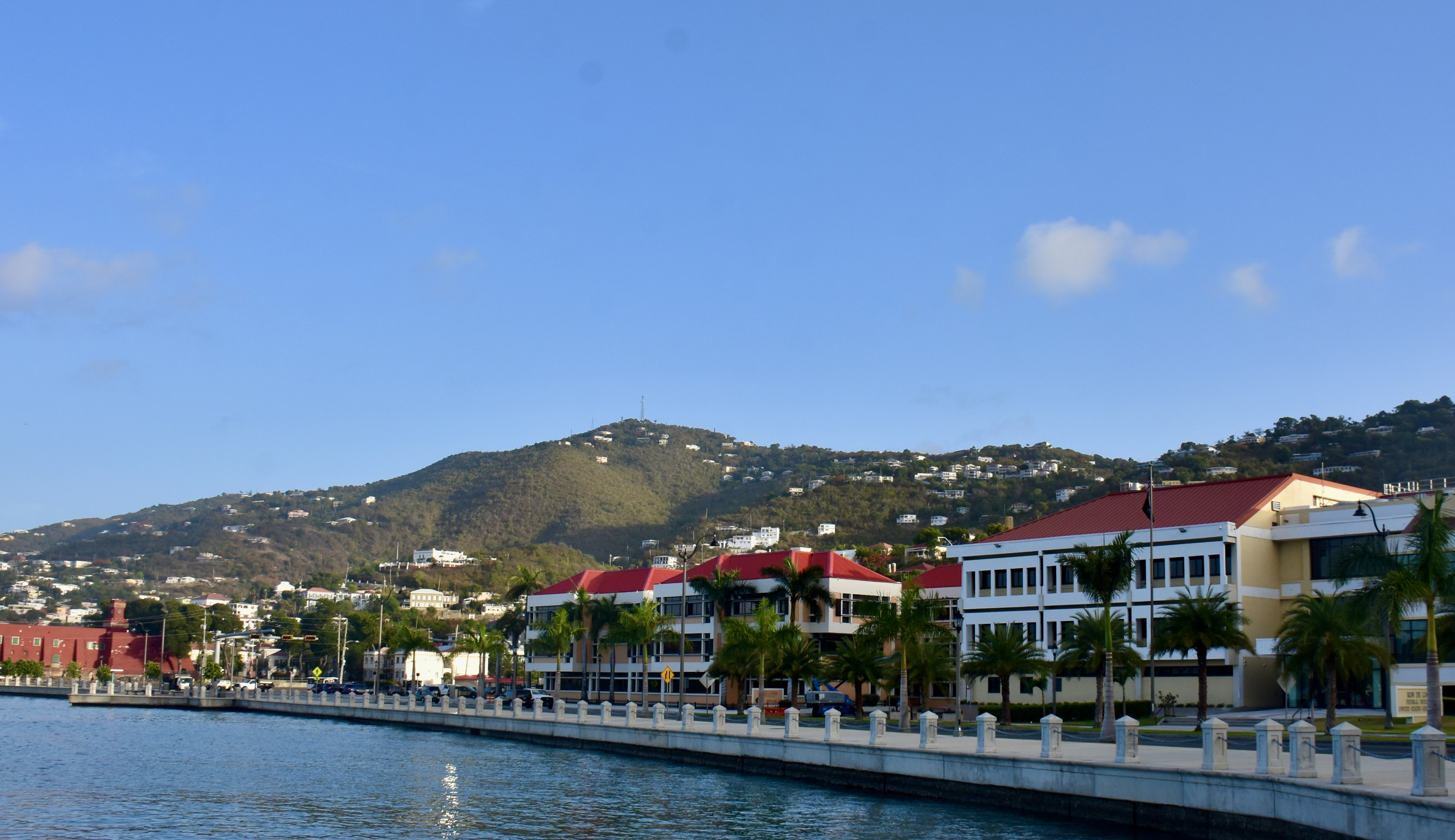
- Crown Mountain as seen from Charlotte Amalie, St. Thomas, U.S. Virgin Islands, June 2022.

Highest point
- Elevation: 1,555 ft (474 m)
- Prominence: 1,555 ft (474 m)
- Listing: Territory high point
- Coordinates: 18°21′26″N 64°58′29″W

Geography
- Location within the U.S. Virgin Islands
- Location: Saint Thomas, U.S. Virgin Islands

Climbing
- Easiest route: Hike

Crown Mountain is located on the island of Saint Thomas, U.S. Virgin Islands and is the highest point of the United States Virgin Islands. It is 1,555 feet (474 m) in height.

== See also ==
- Geography of the United States Virgin Islands
- List of mountain peaks of the United States
- List of U.S. states by elevation
