= List of mammals of the U.S. Virgin Islands =

This is a list of the mammal species recorded in the U.S. Virgin Islands. Of the native mammal species in the U.S. Virgin Islands, two are vulnerable and one species has been classified as extinct.

The following tags are used to highlight each species' conservation status as assessed by the International Union for Conservation of Nature:

| EX | Extinct | No reasonable doubt that the last individual has died. |
| EW | Extinct in the wild | Known only to survive in captivity or as a naturalized populations well outside its previous range. |
| CR | Critically endangered | The species is in imminent risk of extinction in the wild. |
| EN | Endangered | The species is facing an extremely high risk of extinction in the wild. |
| VU | Vulnerable | The species is facing a high risk of extinction in the wild. |
| NT | Near threatened | The species does not meet any of the criteria that would categorise it as risking extinction but it is likely to do so in the future. |
| LC | Least concern | There are no current identifiable risks to the species. |
| DD | Data deficient | There is inadequate information to make an assessment of the risks to this species. |

Some species were assessed using an earlier set of criteria. Species assessed using this system have the following instead of near threatened and least concern categories:

| LR/cd | Lower risk/conservation dependent | Species which were the focus of conservation programmes and may have moved into a higher risk category if that programme was discontinued. |
| LR/nt | Lower risk/near threatened | Species which are close to being classified as vulnerable but are not the subject of conservation programmes. |
| LR/lc | Lower risk/least concern | Species for which there are no identifiable risks. |

== Subclass: Theria ==
=== Infraclass: Eutheria ===
==== Order: Sirenia (manatees and dugongs) ====
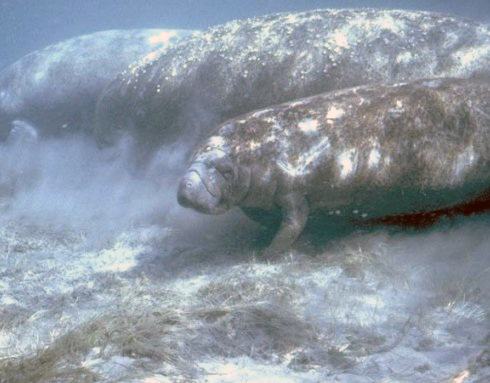
West Indian manatees

Sirenia is an order of fully aquatic, herbivorous mammals that inhabit rivers, estuaries, coastal marine waters, swamps, and marine wetlands. All four species are endangered.

- Family: Trichechidae
  - Genus: Trichechus
    - West Indian manatee, Trichechus manatus VU

==== Order: Rodentia (rodents) ====
Rodentia is an order of mammals characterised by two continuously growing incisors in the upper and lower jaws which must be kept short by gnawing.

- Family: Dasyproctidae
  - Genus: Dasyprocta
    - Red-rumped agouti, Dasyprocta leporina LC introduced
- Suborder: Hystricomorpha
  - Family: Capromyidae
    - Subfamily: Isolobodontinae
      - Genus: Isolobodon
        - Puerto Rican hutia, I. portoricensis EX introduced

==== Order: Chiroptera (bats) ====
The bats' most distinguishing feature is that their forelimbs are developed as wings, making them the only mammals capable of flight. Bat species account for about 20% of all mammals.

- Family: Noctilionidae
  - Genus: Noctilio
    - Greater bulldog bat, Noctilio leporinus LR/lc
- Family: Phyllostomidae
  - Subfamily: Brachyphyllinae
    - Genus: Brachyphylla
      - Antillean fruit-eating bat, Brachyphylla cavernarum LR/lc
  - Subfamily: Glossophaginae
    - Genus: Glossophaga
      - Miller's long-tongued bat, Glossophaga longirostris LR/lc
  - Subfamily: Stenodermatinae
    - Genus: Artibeus
      - Jamaican fruit bat, Artibeus jamaicensis LR/lc
    - Genus: Stenoderma
      - Red fruit bat, Stenoderma rufum VU

==== Order: Cetacea (whales) ====
The order Cetacea includes whales, dolphins and porpoises. They are the mammals most fully adapted to aquatic life with a spindle-shaped nearly hairless body, protected by a thick layer of blubber, and forelimbs and tail modified to provide propulsion underwater.

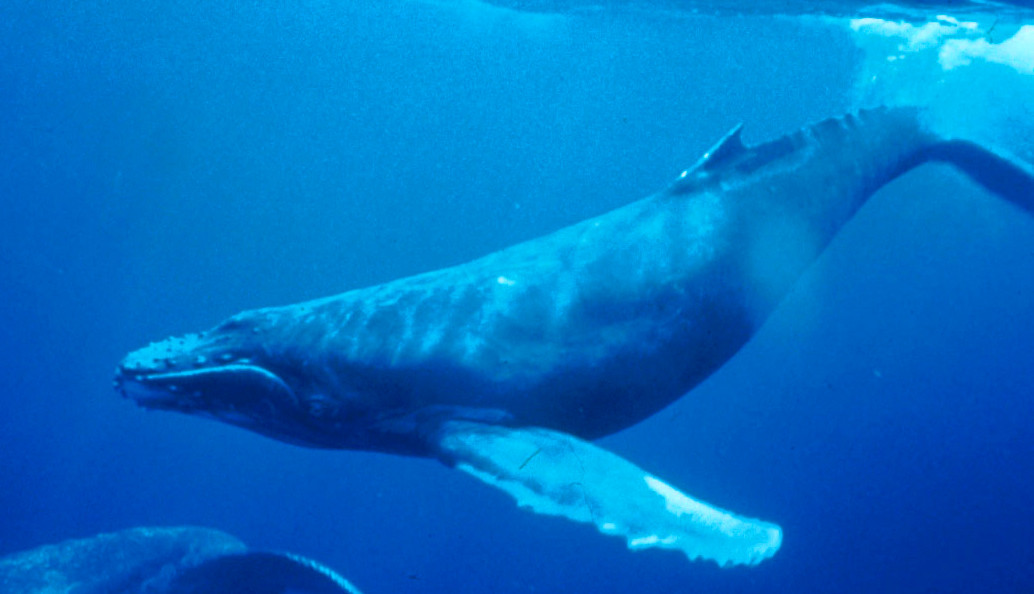
Humpback whale

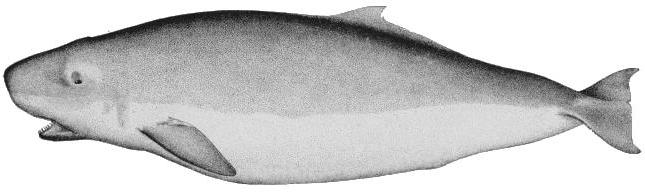
Pygmy sperm whale

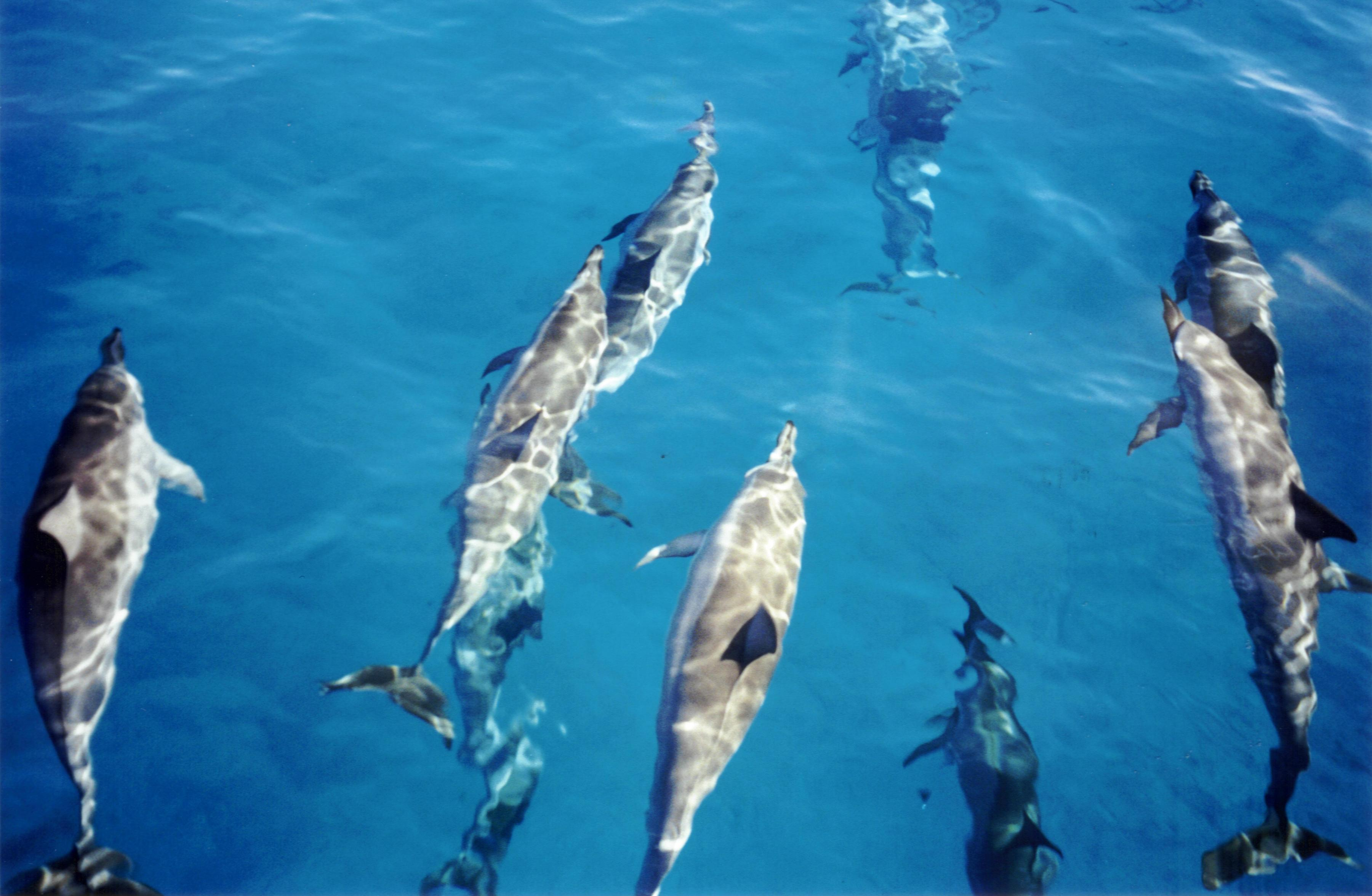
Spinner dolphins

Orcas

The order Cetacea includes whales, dolphins and porpoises. They are the mammals most fully adapted to aquatic life with a spindle-shaped nearly hairless body, protected by a thick layer of blubber, and forelimbs and tail modified to provide propulsion underwater.

- Suborder: Mysticeti
  - Family: Balaenopteridae (baleen whales)
    - Genus: Balaenoptera
      - Common minke whale, Balaenoptera acutorostrata
      - Sei whale, Balaenoptera borealis
      - Bryde's whale, Balaenoptera brydei
      - Blue whale, Balaenoptera musculus
    - Genus: Megaptera
      - Humpback whale, Megaptera novaeangliae
- Suborder: Odontoceti
  - Superfamily: Platanistoidea
    - Family: Delphinidae (marine dolphins)
      - Genus: Delphinus
        - Short-beaked common dolphin, Delphinus delphis DD
      - Genus: Feresa
        - Pygmy killer whale, Feresa attenuata DD
      - Genus: Globicephala
        - Short-finned pilot whale, Globicephala macrorhynchus DD
      - Genus: Lagenodelphis
        - Fraser's dolphin, Lagenodelphis hosei DD
      - Genus: Grampus
        - Risso's dolphin, Grampus griseus DD
      - Genus: Orcinus
        - Killer whale, Orcinus orca DD
      - Genus: Peponocephala
        - Melon-headed whale, Peponocephala electra DD
      - Genus: Pseudorca
        - False killer whale, Pseudorca crassidens DD
      - Genus: Stenella
        - Pantropical spotted dolphin, Stenella attenuata DD
        - Clymene dolphin, Stenella clymene DD
        - Striped dolphin, Stenella coeruleoalba DD
        - Atlantic spotted dolphin, Stenella frontalis DD
        - Spinner dolphin, Stenella longirostris DD
      - Genus: Steno
        - Rough-toothed dolphin, Steno bredanensis DD
      - Genus: Tursiops
        - Common bottlenose dolphin, Tursiops truncatus
    - Family: Physeteridae (sperm whales)
      - Genus: Physeter
        - Sperm whale, Physeter catodon DD
    - Family: Kogiidae (dwarf sperm whales)
      - Genus: Kogia
        - Pygmy sperm whale, Kogia breviceps DD
        - Dwarf sperm whale, Kogia sima DD
  - Superfamily Ziphioidea
    - Family: Ziphidae (beaked whales)
      - Genus: Mesoplodon
        - Gervais' beaked whale, Mesoplodon europaeus DD
      - Genus: Ziphius
        - Cuvier's beaked whale, Ziphius cavirostris DD

==== Order: Carnivora (carnivorans) ====
There are over 260 species of carnivorans, the majority of which feed primarily on meat. They have a characteristic skull shape and dentition. The order Carnivora is represented in the U.S. Virgin Islands by an introduced species, the small Indian mongoose (Herpestes auropunctatus), which is a species of mongoose found in the wild in South and Southeast Asia. It has been introduced to various parts of the world, including the Caribbean. In addition, the Caribbean monk seal frequently visited many of the islands, but is now classified as extinct.

- Family: Herpestidae
  - Subfamily: Herpestinae
    - Genus: Urva
      - Small Indian mongoose, U. auropunctata LC introduced
- Suborder: Pinnipedia
  - Family: Phocidae (earless seals)
    - Genus: Neomonachus
      - Caribbean monk seal, N. tropicalis EX

== See also ==
- List of chordate orders
- Lists of mammals by region
- List of prehistoric mammals
- Mammal classification
- List of mammals described in the 2000s
