= Nur Mosque =

Mosque in Charlotte Amalie, Saint Thomas, United States Virgin Islands

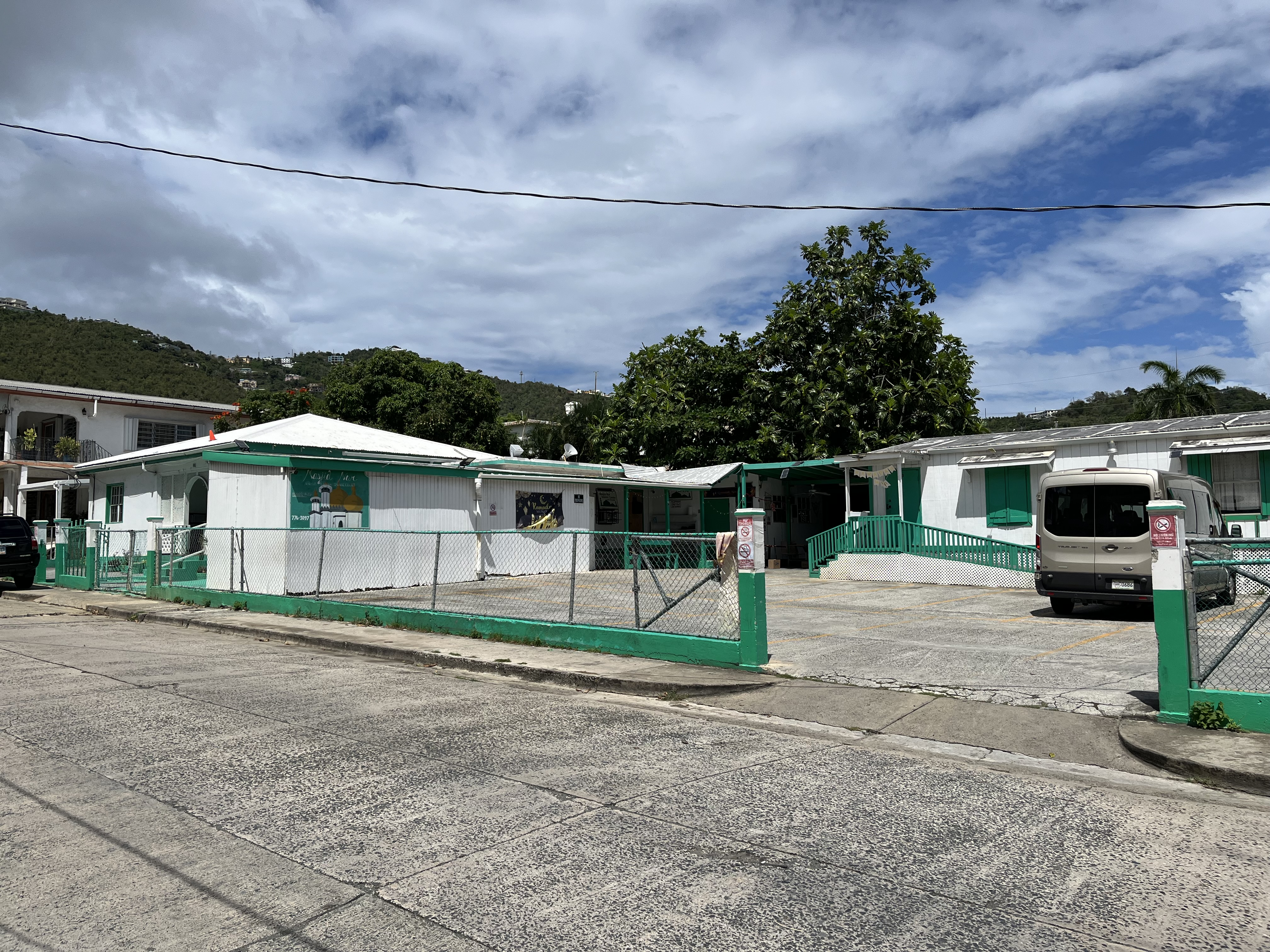

- Location in the mosque in the U.S. Virgin Islands

Religion
- Affiliation: Islam
- Ecclesiastical or organisational status: Mosque
- Status: Active

Location
- Location: Charlotte Amalie, Saint Thomas, U.S. Virgin Islands
- Country: United States
- Interactive map of Nur Mosque
- Coordinates: 18°20′17″N 64°55′02″W

Architecture
- Type: Mosque
- Completed: 1978

The Nur Mosque is a mosque in Charlotte Amalie, Saint Thomas, U.S. Virgin Islands, a dependent territory of the United States.

== Overview ==
The mosque was originally constructed in 1978 as the Muhammad Mosque the first mosque in the territory. It was then later renamed as the Nur Mosque.

== See also ==
- List of mosques in the United States
- Islam in the United States Virgin Islands
