= Geology of the United States Virgin Islands =

The geology of the U.S. Virgin Islands includes mafic volcanic rocks, with complex mineralogy that first began to erupt in the Mesozoic overlain and interspersed with carbonate and conglomerate units.

== Geologic history, stratigraphy, and tectonics ==
Although the island chain comprises Saint Croix, Saint Thomas and Saint John, the most research has focused on the origins of Saint John.

The island began to form with keratophyre and pillow basalt below water, creating the two kilometer thick Water Island Formation in the Early Cretaceous on oceanic plateau crust. Radiolarian chert deposited along with the submarine volcanic activity, accompanied by dikes and small plutons in the Careen Hill Intrusive Suite. An extensional environment is inferred by the presence of sheeted dikes. Geologists have debated the origins of keratophyres, suggesting a back-arc basin environment, although this is challenged by high-levels of silica in the rocks. Local hydrothermal alteration was proposed as a reason for metal anomalies in the Lameshur Volcanic-Intrusive Complex.

The 1.5 kilometer thick Louisenhoj Formation contains clasts which record a shift toward clinopyroxene andesite and basalt more typical of island arcs, above the Water Island Formation. Except as pillow basalt on Ramgoat Cay, primary volcanic units are scarce from this time period. Given the boulder-sized clasts and different mineralogy, geologists have inferred that these clasts must have originated from several different large vents close by.

Unlike Saint John, on Saint Thomas, radiolarian chert exists but is much rarer. Pyroclastic flows are preserved on Saint Thomas, together with limited fossil-bearing limestone deposits and calcite cement in upper rock units. The Outer Brass Limestone deposited during a lull in volcanic activity in the Turonian and Santonian. The limestone unit also contains calc-silicate rocks, marble and conglomerate bound together with calcareous cement and including both marble and andesite clasts.

In the Late Cretaceous, the overlying Tutu Formation took shape with volcanic turbidite and rare pyroxene basalt. Silt or sand-sized material is most common unlike the Louisenhoj Formation boulders, suggesting a more distant volcanic source. In fact, sediments become finer, ascending upward into the Picara Member and Mandal Member. Striking slump folds and deformation of limestone and conglomerate beds is common.

On Saint John, the Tutu Formation is the youngest stratified unit, although volcanism continued on the neighboring British Virgin Islands until the Eocene. On Saint John, a large dike swarm formed in formed in the early or mid-Cenozoic. Broad folds formed due to north–south compression, likely due to the collision of the Greater Antilles arc with the Bahama Platform of the North American Plate. Deformation increases northward across Saint John.

The Narrows pluton and Virgin Gorda batholith, which are dominated by tonalite followed the episode of compression, forming around 39 million years ago in the Eocene. East-west compression brought brittle fractures filled with veins of calcite and limonite. Spreading at the Cayman Trough may explain north-plunging late folds, due to eastward movement of the Caribbean plate. The formation of the Cayman Trough produced the last significant tectonic feature on the islands after 39 million years ago, with sinistral strike-slip faults. A structural block produced as a result creates a 5.7 kilometer sinistrally offset contact between the Water Island and Louisenhoj formations.

== Hydrogeology ==
One of the most in-depth studies of groundwater in the U.S. Virgin Islands was conducted by the U.S. Geological Survey in 1995, focused on Saint Croix. The south-central part of the island is underlain by alluvium and carbonate rocks, including lenses of silt and clay. The Oligocene to Miocene Jealousy formation, the Miocene and Pliocene Kingshill Limestone and Pliocene Post-Kingshill Limestone are all a single hydrological unit. The water-table aquifer ranges between five and 68 feet below the grounds surface and overall groundwater in the area contained comparatively high sodium chloride concentrations.
