= Enighed, Saint Thomas, U.S. Virgin Islands =

Coordinates: 18.36329°N 64.92264°W

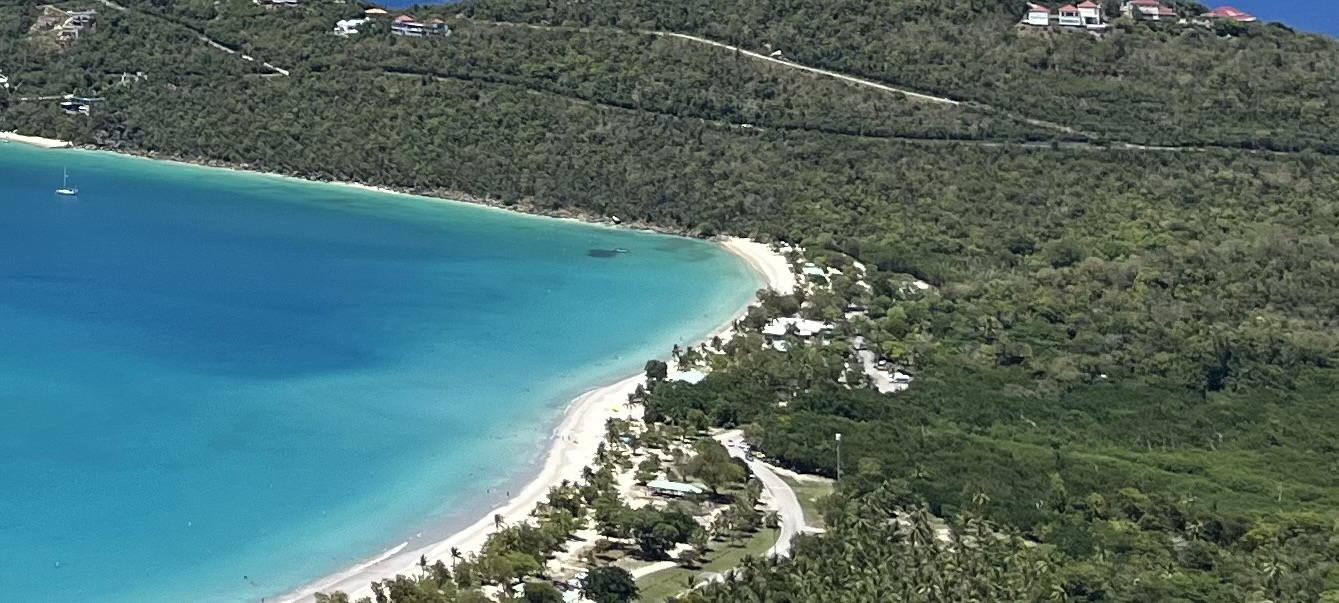
Enighed

Enighed is a settlement on the island of Saint Thomas in the United States Virgin Islands.
