= Seal of the United States Virgin Islands =

Official government emblem of the U.S. territory of the United States Virgin Islands

- Armiger: United States Virgin Islands
- Adopted: 1991
- Motto: United in Pride and Hope

The seal of the United States Virgin Islands is an official symbol of the United States Virgin Islands.

== History ==
The present seal was adopted on January 1, 1991 and replaced an earlier seal similar to the flag of the United States Virgin Islands, which was based on the central design of the Great Seal of the United States.

== Design ==
The seal features the three-island design of the main islands of Saint Croix, Saint John and Saint Thomas, often seen throughout the territory. It reads "Government of the United States Virgin Islands". The seal also contains the flag of the United States and also the flag of Denmark to symbolize its former status as a Danish colony before 1917. There is also, centered in the seal, a bananaquit, the island's national bird and a ribbon bearing the motto United in Pride and Hope. It was designed by St. Thomas artist Mitchlyn E. Davis, Sr.
