= List of United States Virgin Islands senators =

== 34th Legislature of the U.S. Virgin Islands (2021) ==
=== Senator at-large (Saint John) ===
- Senator Angel Bolques Jr. (Democrat)

=== Saint Croix senators ===
- Senator Novelle Francis Vice President-Secretary for Intergovernmental and Territorial Affairs (Democrat)
- Senator Kurt Vialet (Democrat)
- Senator Javan James Sr. (Independent)
- Senator Franklin Johnson (Independent)
- Senator Genevieve Whitaker (Democrat)
- Senator Samuel Carrión (Independent)
- Senator Kenneth L Gittens (Democrat) Liaison to the White House

=== Saint Thomas-Saint John senators ===
- Senator Donna Frett-Gregory-Senate President (Democrat)
- Senator Marvin A. Blyden-Liaison to the U.S Congress (Democrat)
- Senator Dwayne m. De Graff (Independent)
- Alma Francis-Heyliger (Independent)
- Senator Carla J Joseph (Democrat)
- Senator Janelle K. Sarauw (Independent)
- Senator Kurt Vialet (Independent)

=== Officers of the 34 Legislature ===
President: Senator Donna Frett-Gregory

Vice President: Senator Novelle Francis

Secretary: Senator Genevieve Whitaker

Majority Leader: Senator Marvin Blyden

Secretary of Intern Governmental and Territorial Affairs: Senator Novelle Francis

Liaison to US Congress: Senator Marvin Blyden

Liaison to US Department of Interior Office of Insular Affairs: Senator Genevieve Whitaker

Liaison to the White House: Senator Kenneth Gittens
