= .vi =

Internet country code top-level domain for the U.S. Virgin Islands

- Introduced: August 31, 1995
- TLD type: Country code top-level domain
- Status: Active
- Registry: Virgin Islands Public Telecommunication System
- Sponsor: Virgin Islands Public Telecommunication System
- Intended use: Entities connected with United States Virgin Islands
- Actual use: Used in U.S. Virgin Islands
- Registration restrictions: Available worldwide but less expensive for Virgin Islands residents
- Structure: Registrations are available directly at second level or at third level below second-level names
- Documents: Rules
- Dispute policies: None; advises use of UDRP
- DNSSEC: No
- Registry website: nic.vi

.vi is the Internet country code top-level domain (ccTLD) for the U.S. Virgin Islands.

== Registration ==
Registration is available in .vi or one of its second-level TLDs. Current prices are $75 for registration for residents of the U.S. Virgin Islands and $300 for foreign registrants. The second-level TLDs cost $75 or $200 respectively. There are premium domain names with different prices. Renewal fees are significantly lower and there is also a price for most contact or nameserver updates.

The only restriction for registration is that the domain has at least 2 active nameservers.

Third level registrations are available in .co.vi, .org.vi, .com.vi and .net.vi. There are no further restrictions in these zones.

== Registrars ==
Domains can be bought directly from the registry or from official registrars. The registry does not publish a list of official registrars.

A domain transfer between registrars is possible via Auth-Code.

== History ==
Second level domains (of more than 2 characters) were only allowed for Virgin Island companies or residents until 2014, when COBEX allowed foreign entities to register .vi domains.

== See also ==
- Internet in the United States Virgin Islands
- Internet in the United States
- .vg – ccTLD for neighboring British Virgin Islands
- .us – ccTLD for the United States
