= Geography of the United States Virgin Islands =

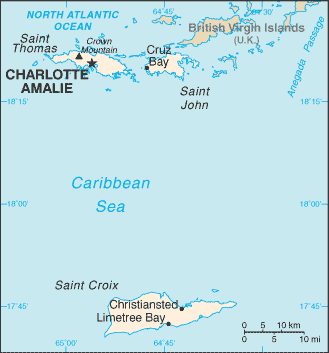
A map of the United States Virgin Islands.

Three largest islands	Population (2020 census)	Area	Population density	Largest town
St. Thomas	42,261	32 mi^{2} (83 km^{2})	1,319/mi^{2} (509/km^{2})	Charlotte Amalie
St. John	3,881	20 mi^{2} (52 km^{2})	193/mi^{2} (75/km^{2})	Cruz Bay
St. Croix	41,004	83 mi^{2} (215 km^{2})	488/mi^{2} (188/km^{2})	Frederiksted

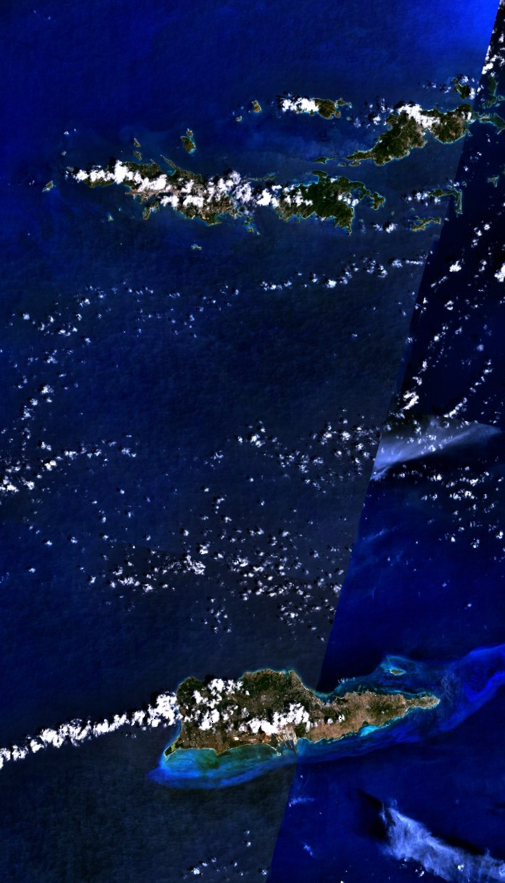
U.S. Virgin Islands - NASA NLT Landsat 7 (Visible Color) Satellite Image.

The United States Virgin Islands are a group of several dozen islands and cays located in the Caribbean, about 1,100 miles (1,770 km) southeast of Florida, 600 miles (966 km) north of Venezuela, 40 miles (64 km) east of Puerto Rico, and immediately west and south of the British Virgin Islands.

The U.S. Virgin Islands lie near the boundary of the North American Plate and the Caribbean Plate, roughly 100 miles (161 km) south of the Puerto Rico Trench and near the Anegada Passage, a key shipping lane. Together with the British Virgin Islands, Vieques, and Culebra, they make up the Virgin Islands archipelago.

The hilly, volcanic islands of Saint Thomas (31 square miles (80 km^{2})) and Saint John (20 square miles (52 km^{2})) border the North Atlantic Ocean to the north and the Caribbean Sea to the south. The larger island of Saint Croix (84 square miles (218 km^{2})) lies 40 miles (64 km) to the south across the Virgin Islands Trough and is entirely in the Caribbean Sea.

Charlotte Amalie, Saint Thomas is one of the best natural, deepwater harbors in the Caribbean. The Islands have many well-known beaches, including Magens Bay (Saint Thomas) and Trunk Bay (Saint John), and coral reefs, including the Virgin Islands Coral Reef National Monument and the Buck Island Reef National Monument. More than half of Saint John and nearly all of Hassel Island are owned by the U.S. National Park Service.

== Statistics ==
Geographic coordinates (capital Charlotte Amalie): 18°21′N 64°57′W

Islands:

Saint Croix, Saint Thomas, Saint John, Water Island, many other islands

Area:

total: 738 sq mi (1,910 km²)
land: 134 sq mi (346 km²)
water: 604 sq mi (1,564 km²)

Comparative area: twice the size of the District of Columbia

Maritime claims:

exclusive economic zone: 200 nmi (370.4 km; 230.2 mi)
territorial sea: 12 nmi (22.2 km; 13.8 mi)

Land use:

arable land: 5.71%
permanent crops: 2.86%
other: 91.43% (2005)

Irrigated land: 1 km^{2}

Natural hazards: frequent and severe droughts and floods; occasional earthquakes; rare tsunamis

Environment—current issues: lack of natural freshwater resources

== Terrain ==
The islands' terrain is mostly hilly to rugged and mountainous with little level land. Crown Mountain, on Saint Thomas, is the highest point in the U.S. Virgin Islands at 1,555 ft (474 m). Sea level is the lowest point. It has a coastline of 117 mi (188 km). The territory is known for its beaches and plentiful sunshine.

== Climate ==
The U.S. Virgin Islands enjoys a tropical climate, moderated by easterly trade winds and with relatively low humidity. Temperatures vary little throughout the year as summer and winter high temperatures differ by 3°C or 5°F or less on average.

In the capital, Charlotte Amalie, typical daily maximum temperatures are around 91 °F (32.8 °C) in the summer and 86 °F (30 °C) in the winter. Typical daily minimum temperatures are around 78 °F (25.6 °C) in the summer and 72 °F (22.2 °C) in the winter. Water temperatures are around 83 °F (28.3 °C) in the summer and 79 °F (26 °C) in the winter. Rainfall averages about 38 inches (965 mm) per year. Rainfall can be quite variable, but the wettest months on average are September to November and the driest months on average are February and March.

The islands are subject to tropical storms and hurricanes, with the hurricane season running from June to November. In recent history, substantial damage was caused by Hurricane Irma and Hurricane Maria in 2017, Hurricane Hugo in 1989 and Hurricane Marilyn in 1995. The islands were also struck by Hurricane Bertha in 1996, Hurricane Georges in 1998, Hurricane Lenny in 1999, Tropical Storm Jeanne in 2004, Hurricane Omar in 2008, Hurricane Earl in 2010, Tropical Storm Otto in 2010, and Tropical Storm Tomas in 2010, but damage was less severe in those storms.

Climate data for Saint Thomas, United States Virgin Islands
Month	Jan	Feb	Mar	Apr	May	Jun	Jul	Aug	Sep	Oct	Nov	Dec	Year
Record high °F (°C)	93 (34)	93 (34)	94 (34)	96 (36)	97 (36)	99 (37)	98 (37)	99 (37)	98 (37)	97 (36)	95 (35)	92 (33)	99 (37)
Mean daily maximum °F (°C)	85 (29)	85 (29)	86 (30)	87 (31)	88 (31)	89 (32)	90 (32)	90 (32)	90 (32)	89 (32)	87 (31)	86 (30)	88 (31)
Mean daily minimum °F (°C)	72 (22)	73 (23)	73 (23)	74 (23)	76 (24)	78 (26)	78 (26)	78 (26)	78 (26)	77 (25)	75 (24)	74 (23)	76 (24)
Record low °F (°C)	63 (17)	62 (17)	56 (13)	62 (17)	66 (19)	67 (19)	57 (14)	59 (15)	64 (18)	66 (19)	52 (11)	62 (17)	52 (11)
Average precipitation inches (mm)	2.38 (60)	1.48 (38)	1.42 (36)	2.74 (70)	3.06 (78)	2.53 (64)	2.85 (72)	3.74 (95)	5.58 (142)	5.42 (138)	5.23 (133)	2.96 (75)	39.39 (1,001)
Source: weather.com

== See also ==
- Islands of the United States Virgin Islands
