= Transportation in the United States Virgin Islands =

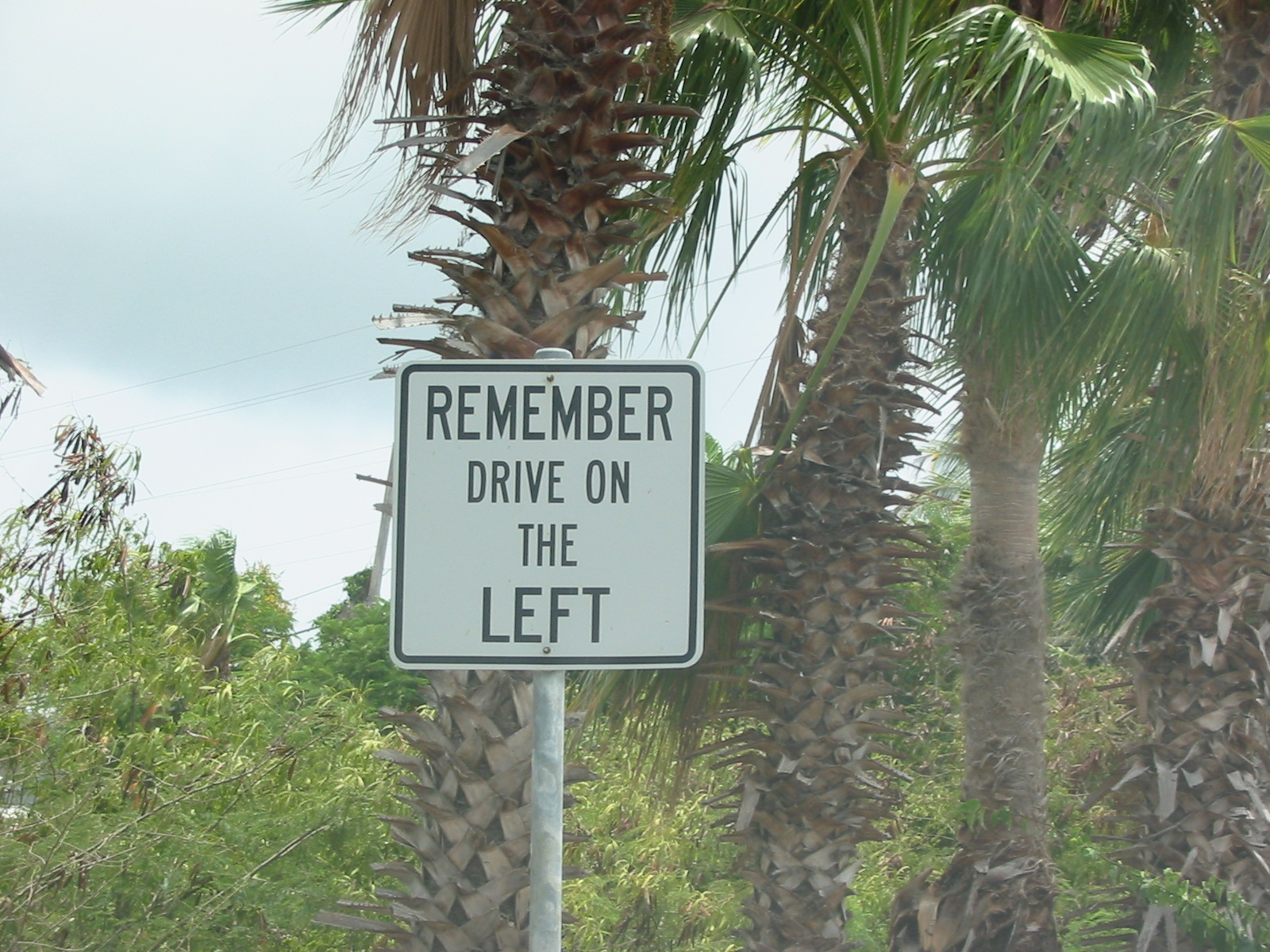
A street sign reminding drivers to drive on the left.

The United States Virgin Islands (USVI) is the only place under United States jurisdiction where the rule of the road is to drive on the left. However, virtually all passenger vehicles are left hand drive due to imports of U.S. vehicles.

== Land ==
Cars drive on the left hand side of the road, but nearly all the automobiles on the island have left-side steering columns. Due to the terrain, roads are often narrow, steep, and take with sharp turns. They tend to be poorly surfaced.

=== Roadways ===
The USVI have 1,240 mi (2,000 km) of roadways, about 750 mi (1,210 km) of public roads and 490 mi (790 km) of private roads. Most public roads are two-lane and are paved with asphalt or concrete. There are few shoulders. Guts (culverts) and retaining walls help prevent flooding and landslides. Private roads are often unpaved or semi-paved.

=== Public transportation and taxis ===
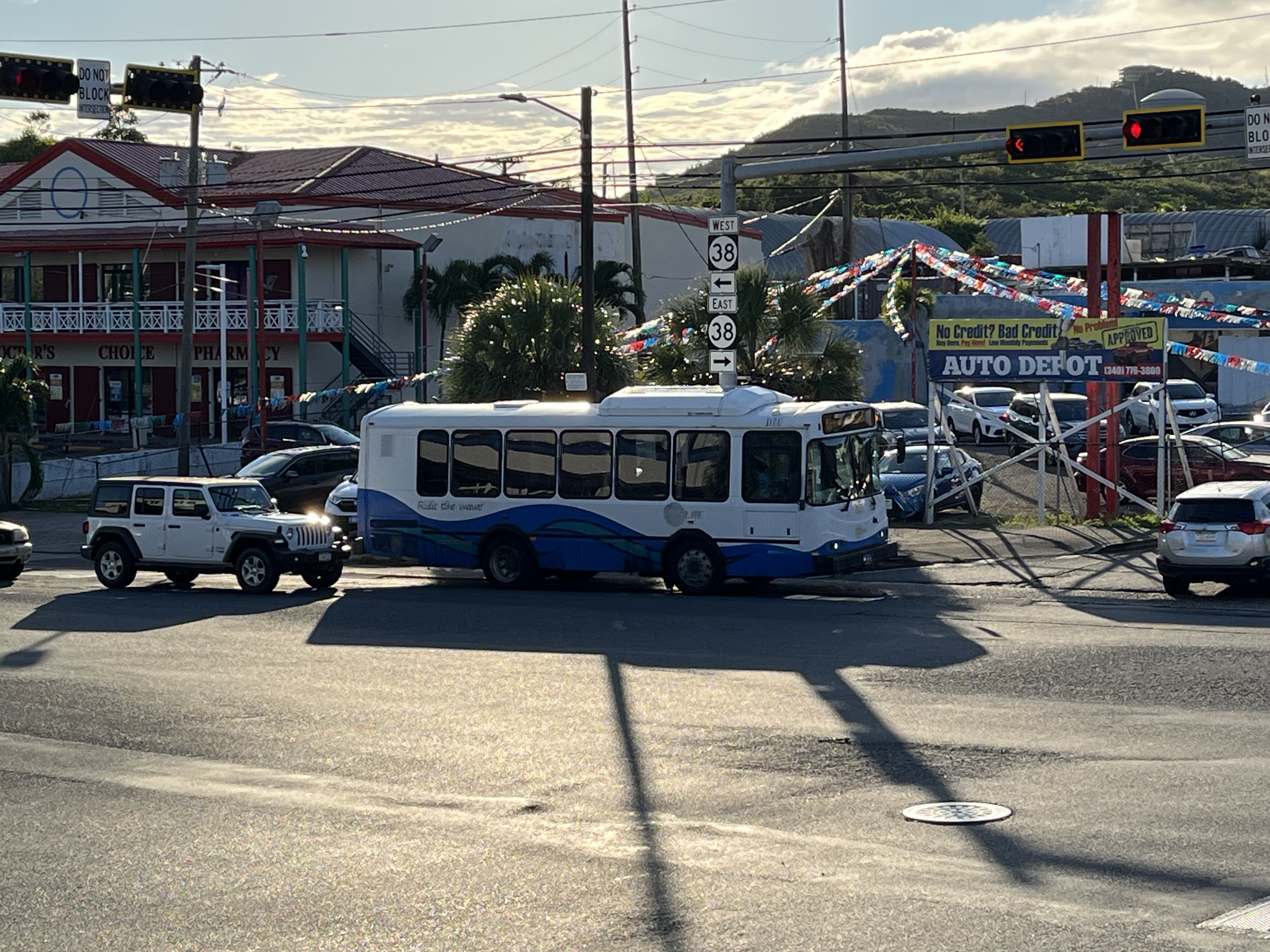
Virgin Islands Transit public bus

Virgin Islands Transit (VITRAN) public buses run between the main towns and areas of local interest (not tourist destinations). Privately owned "dollar ride" or "dollar run" taxi buses stop at or near many bus stops. They follow a predefined route, but do not follow a regular schedule. It is often possible to get off anywhere along their route. These buses charge a flat rate for the trip, either $1 or $2.

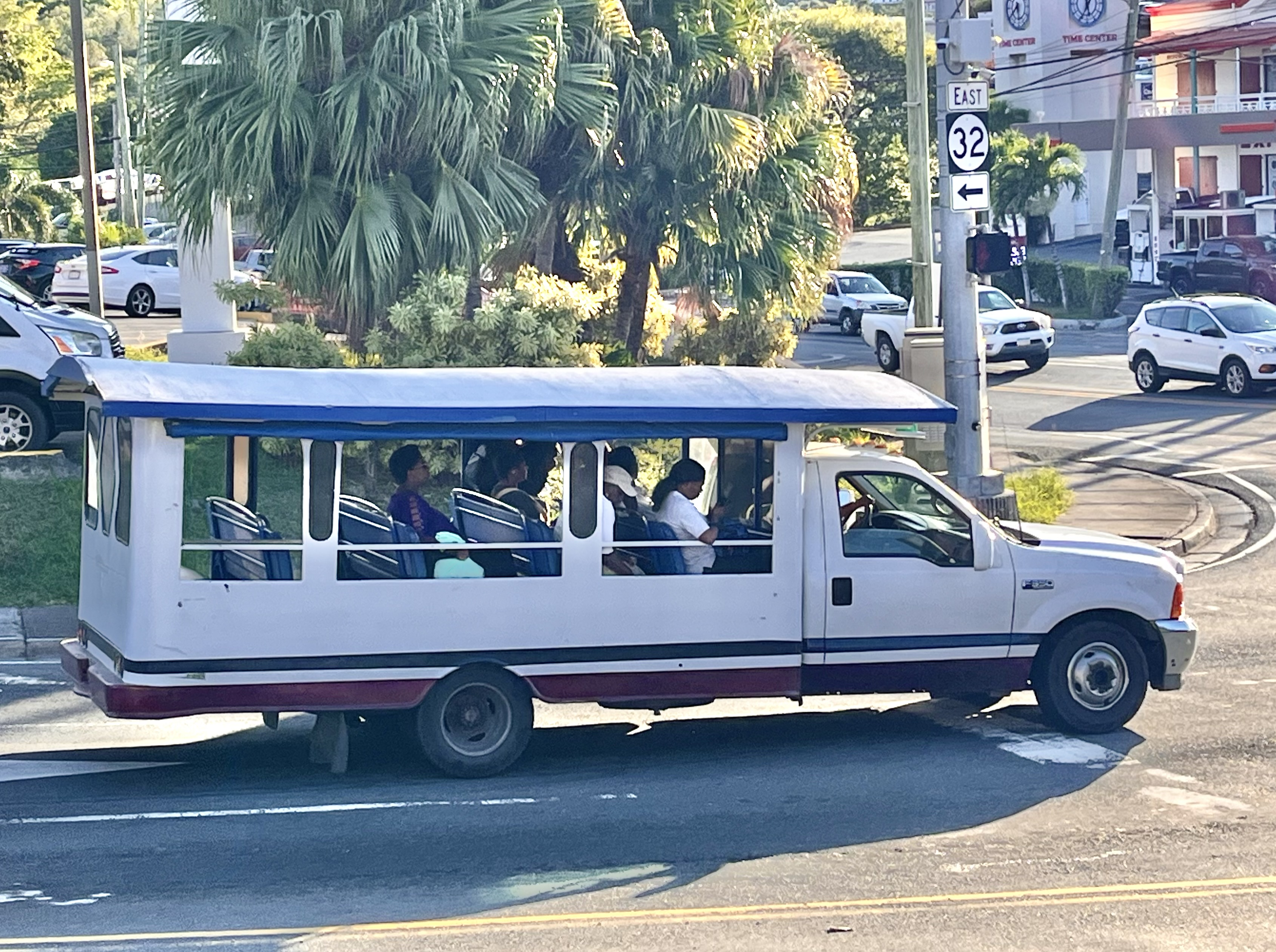
Safari bus

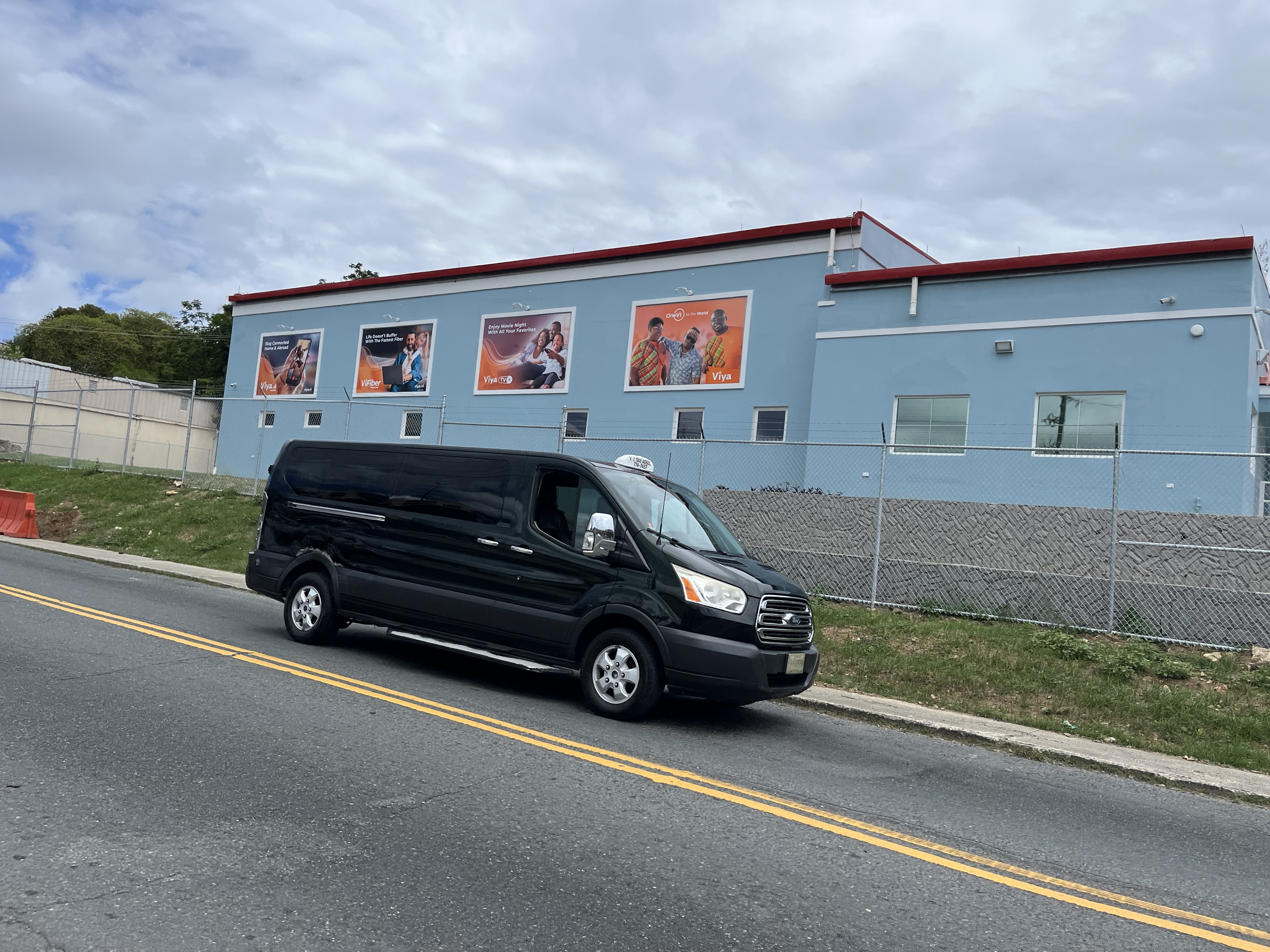
Enclosed van taxi

Nearly all taxis are shared taxis, either enclosed vans or open-air "safaris", that go to destinations that are most convenient for tourists (e.g., hotels, beaches, docks, airports, sightseeing tours). They are not metered and are required by law to charge a flat fare that varies by destination. However, private taxis can be booked online to avoid delays or shared space.

== Air ==
Many flights connect the islands to the U.S. mainland. Flights also operate between Saint Thomas and Saint Croix, and from both of them to other islands in the Caribbean.

=== Airports ===
Two international airports serve the islands:

- Henry E. Rohlsen International Airport (Saint Croix)
- Cyril E. King International Airport (Saint Thomas)

There are no airports on Saint John or Water Island.

=== Seaplane bases ===
There are also two seaplane bases:

- Charlotte Amalie Harbor Seaplane Base (St. Thomas)
- Christiansted Harbor Seaplane Base (St. Croix)

== Sea ==
=== Cruise ships ===
About two million people visit the U.S. Virgin Islands by cruise ship each year.

On Saint Thomas, large cruise ships dock at the West Indian Company Dock (WICO), Havensight and the Austin "Babe" Monsanto Marine Facility in Crown Bay (Subbase). Cruise ships can also anchor in the Charlotte Amalie Harbor and tender to Waterfront; mini-cruise ships can dock at the Waterfront.

On Saint Croix, cruise ships arrive at the Ann E. Abramson Marine Facility in Frederiksted. Mini-cruise ships can also dock at Gallows Bay near Christiansted.

On Saint John, mini-cruise ships arrive in Cruz Bay.

=== Ferries ===
The two main ferry terminals on Saint Thomas are The Edward Wilmoth Blyden IV Marine Terminal in Charlotte Amalie and the Urman Victor Fredericks Marine Terminal in Red Hook.

The ferry terminal for Saint Croix is at The Gallows Bay Dock.

On Saint John, passenger ferries enter at The Loredon Lawrence Boynes Sr. Dock while The Theovald Eric Moorehead Dock and Terminal at Enighed Pond.

Water Island has a small dock at Phillips Landing.

There are many and frequent inter-island ferries. Cruz Bay, Saint John can be reached from Charlotte Amalie and Red Hook on Saint Thomas. Car barges also run between Cruz Bay and Red Hook. Water Island can be reached from Crown Bay, Saint Thomas. There is a once daily ferry between Charlotte Amalie and Gallows Bay, Saint Croix. International ferries also run between Saint Thomas, Saint John, and the neighboring British Virgin Islands.

=== Cargo ===
On Saint Thomas, cargo vessels are served by the Crown Bay Cargo Port.

On Saint Croix, cargo vessels are served by The Gallows Bay Dock near Christiansted and the Wilfred "Bomba" Allick Port and Transshipment Center (Containerport) in Krause Lagoon.

On Saint John, cargo vessels are served by the Victor William Sewer Marine Facility (The Creek) and the Theovald Eric Moorehead Dock and Terminal.

=== Other ===
There are numerous marinas and anchorages in the USVI. Vessels entering the islands must proceed directly to a port of entry for clearance before passengers and crew go ashore.

Additional ports, marinas, and anchorage sites include:

- Saint Thomas
  - American Yacht Harbor
  - Benner Bay
  - Frenchtown
  - Yacht Haven Marina
- Saint Croix
  - The Gordon A. Finch Molasses Pier
  - Green Cay Marina
  - Limetree Bay (formerly Hovensa)
- Saint John
  - Coral Bay
  - Chocolate Hole

== Customs ==
Although a U.S. territory, the USVI are maintained as a "free port" in a separate customs zone. Travelers to the continental United States and Puerto Rico need to pre-clear U.S. customs and present a passport or proof of U.S. citizenship or nationality. The immigration status of non-U.S. citizens may be checked during this process as well.
