= List of Superfund sites in the United States Virgin Islands =

This is a list of Superfund sites in the United States Virgin Islands designated under the Comprehensive Environmental Response, Compensation, and Liability Act (CERCLA) environmental law:

CERCLIS ID	Name	County	Reason	Proposed	Listed	Construction completed	Partially deleted	Deleted
VID980651095	Island Chemical Corp./Virgin Islands Chemical Corp.	Saint Croix	Soil contaminated with ethylbenzene, xylenes, acetone, methylene chloride, and chloroform. Groundwater contaminated with methylene chloride, ethylbenzene, xylenes and chloroform.	01/18/1994	06/17/1996	03/24/2004	N/A	10/16/2009
VID982272569	Tutu Wellfield	Saint Thomas	Groundwater contaminated with volatile organic compounds, such as benzene, toluene, perchloroethylene (PCE), 1,2-dichloroethene (DCE), and trichloroethene (TCE).	02/07/1992	09/29/1995	03/29/2004	N/A	N/A

== See also ==
- List of Superfund sites in the United States
- List of environmental issues
- List of waste types
- TOXMAP
