= Telecommunications in the United States Virgin Islands =

Communications in the United States Virgin Islands

The following statistics are from the CIA World Factbook, unless otherwise indicated.

== Telephone ==
Telephones - main lines in use: 74,200 (2008) The traditional wire line provider in the United States Virgin Islands is Viya. Viya is a subsidiary of ATN International

Telephones - mobile cellular: 80,300 (2005)

The islands are served by Liberty Communications, Viya, Claro Puerto Rico, and T-Mobile US.

Telephone system:

general assessment: modern system with total digital switching, uses fiber-optic cable and microwave radio relay
domestic: full range of services available
international: submarine cable connections to US, the Caribbean, Central and South America;; satellite earth stations - NA

Country code / area code +1-340

== Radio ==
Radio broadcast stations: 24 radio stations broadcasting (2009)

Radios: 107,000 (2003)

== Television ==
Television broadcast stations: about a dozen television broadcast stations including 1 public TV station; multi-channel cable and satellite TV services are available (2009)

Televisions: 68,000 (1997)

== Internet ==
The U.S. Virgin Islands' country code top-level domain is .vi.

Internet hosts: 8,933 (2010)

Internet users: 30,000 (2008)

Locally owned and operated Internet Service Provider: SM@RTNET www.smartnet.vi Providing Internet service via fixed wireless and Fiber Optics.

== See also ==
- Internet in the United States Virgin Islands
- Internet in the United States
- .us
