= Enighed, Saint John, U.S. Virgin Islands =

Coordinates: 18.32829°N 64.79153°W

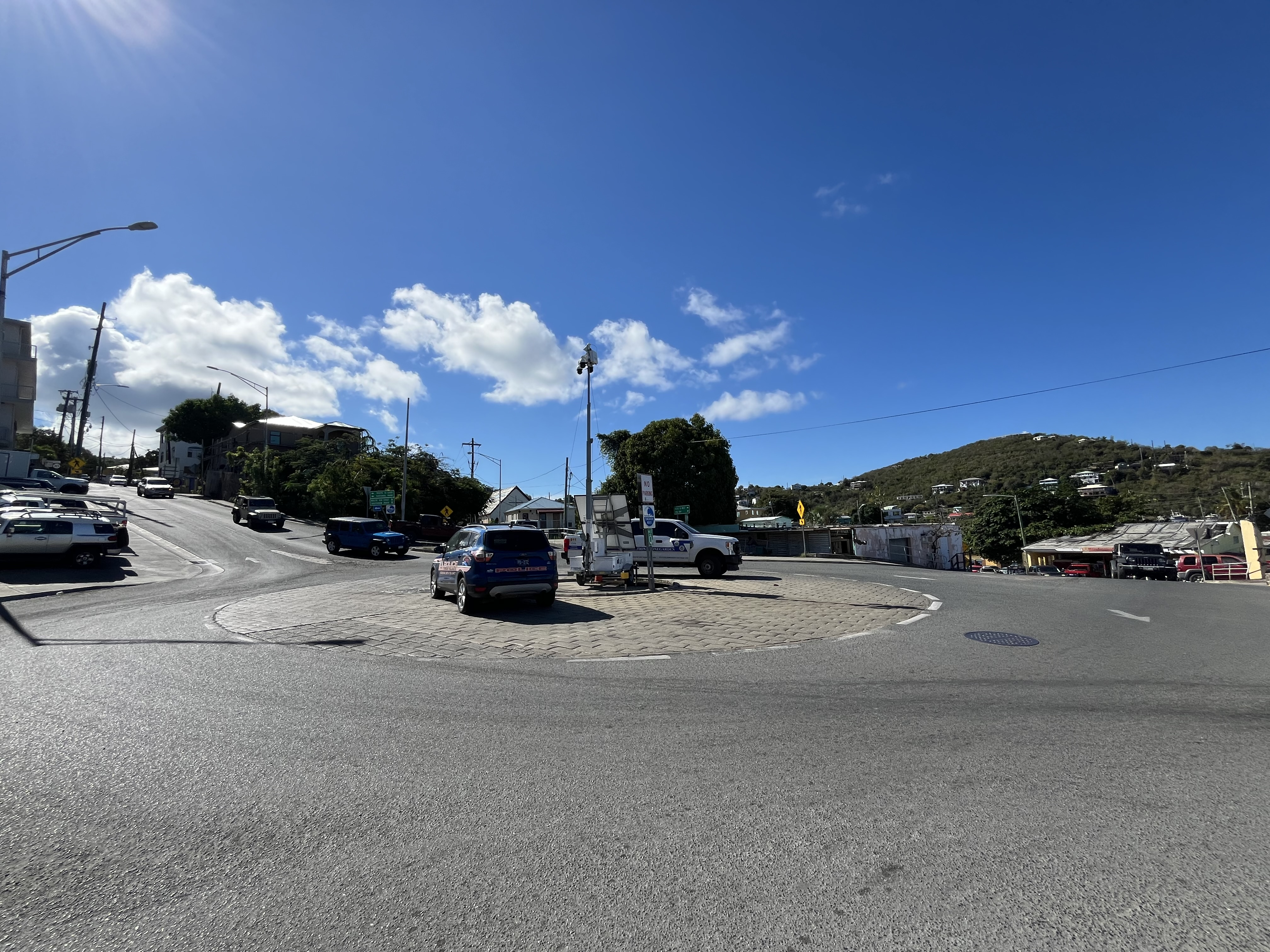
Enighed

Enighed, Saint John is the neighborhood on Enighed Hill adjacent to the town of Cruz Bay on the island of Saint John in the United States Virgin Islands. While technically outside the Cruz Bay quarter, it is locally considered to be part of Cruz Bay. The port facility at Enighed Pond handles cargo and car barges.
