= Fauna of the United States Virgin Islands =

Native animals of the United States Virgin Islands

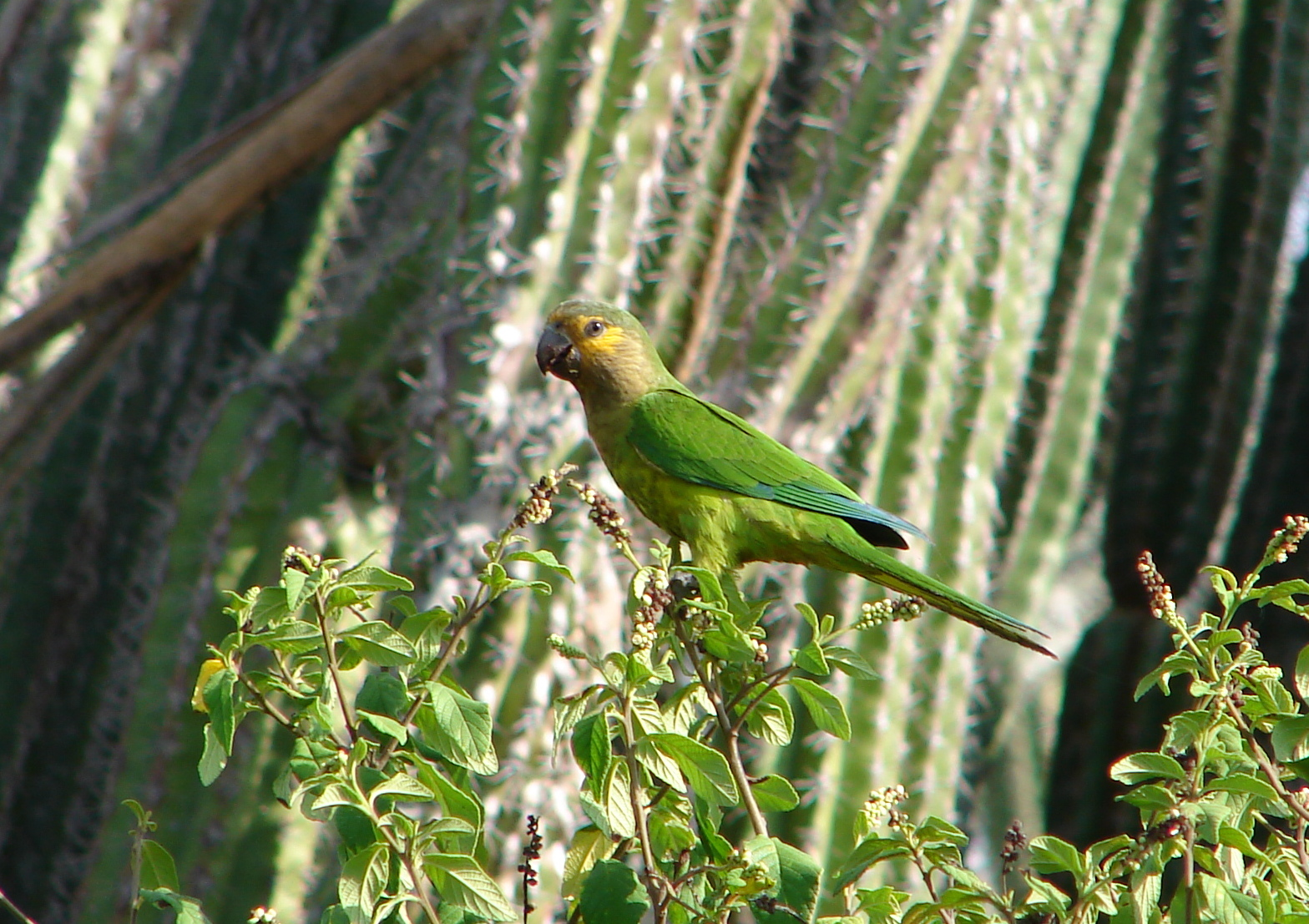
The St Thomas conure (or brown-throated parakeet) lives throughout the Virgin Islands.

The fauna of the United States Virgin Islands consists of 144 species of birds, 22 species of mammals, 302 species of fish and 7 species of amphibians. The animals include numerous native species of tropical birds, fish, and land reptiles as well as sea mammals. The only native land mammals are six species of native bats: the greater bulldog bat, Antillean fruit-eating bat, red fruit bat, Brazilian free-tailed bat, velvety free-tailed bat and the Jamaican fruit bat. Some of the nonnative land mammals roaming the islands are the white-tailed deer, small Asian mongoose, goats, feral donkeys, rats, mice, sheep, hogs, dogs and cats.

Sea mammals includes numerous species of whales, dolphins, orcas, and manatees. The islands' only species of seal, the Caribbean monk seal, was deemed extinct in the early 1950s. Virgin Islands National Park and the Virgin Islands Coral Reef National Monument are the two largest among many refugees for numerous species of wildlife. Some of the currently endangered animals includes the West Indian manatee, Virgin Islands tree boa (Epicrates monensis monensis), Saint Croix ground lizard, and the green sea turtle.

The official territorial bird of the U.S.V.I. is the bananaquit, which is also depicted in the Seal of the United States Virgin Islands. Besides the bananaquit, there are more than 140 other species of birds, including for instance pelicans, parrots, parakeets, flamingos, herons, egrets, hummingbirds, gulls, doves, ospreys, kingfishers and warblers. The island of Saint Croix has several species of animals endemic to the island, including the Saint Croix ground lizard, the Saint Croix's anole, as well as the extinct Saint Croix racer and Saint Croix macaw.

== Reptiles ==
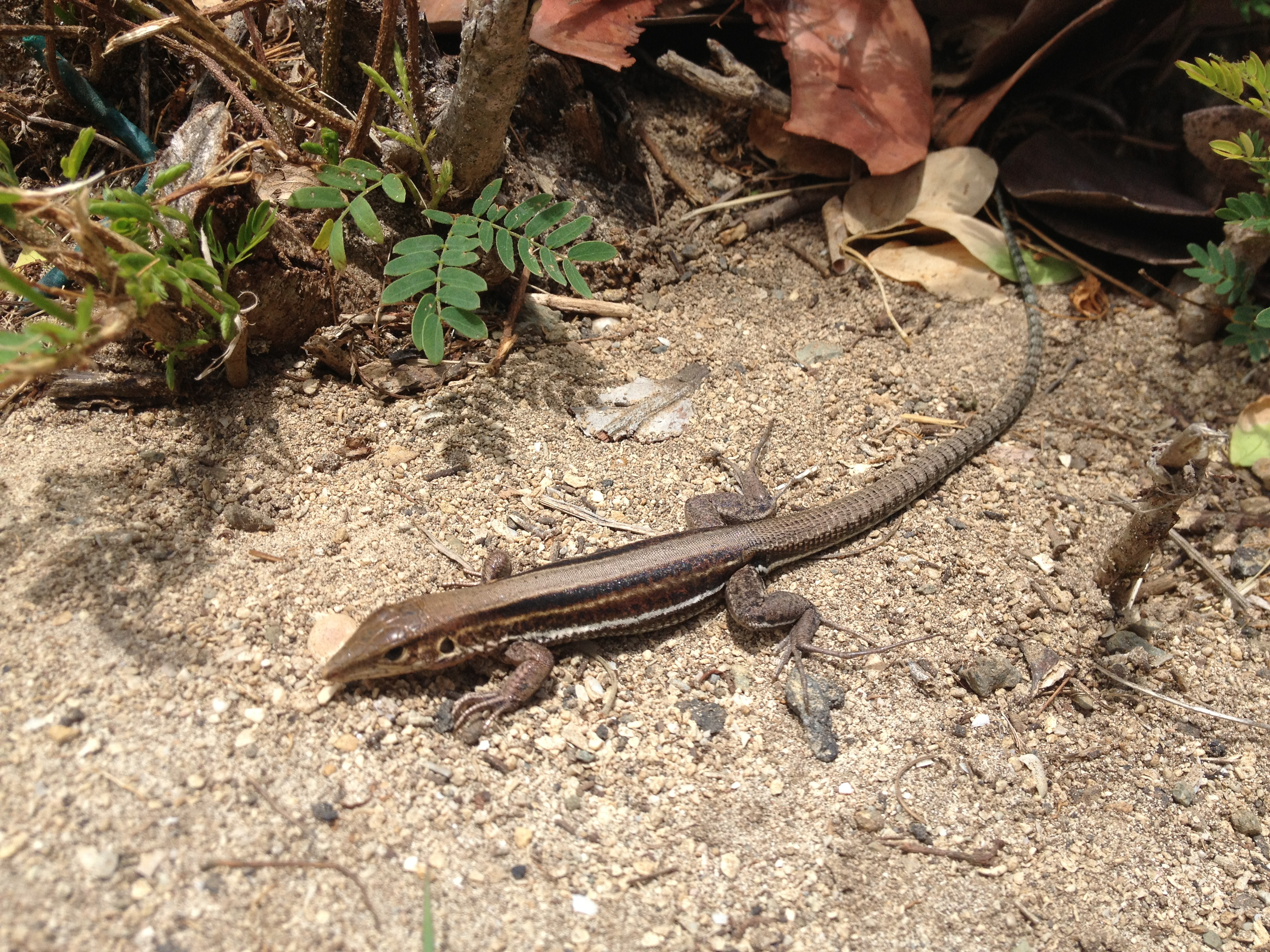
The islands are home to a variety of lizard species, including the depicted Saint Croix ground lizard, which is found on the four islands Protestant Cay, Ruth Cay, Green Cay, and Buck Island.

The U.S. Virgin Islands are home to one of the world's largest species of reptile, the leatherback turtle, as well as one of the largest land lizards, the green iguana. Other species of turtles include the green- and hawksbill turtles, as well as the only non-marine turtle, the red-footed tortoise. Smaller lizards include the Saint Croix's anole, Saint Croix ground lizard, Puerto Rican crested anole, St. Thomas anole, common grass anole and Virgin Islands worm lizard, as well as geckos such as the cotton ginner and house gecko (locally nicknamed “woodslave"). The most common lizard is the ground lizard, and to a lesser extent, the tree lizard.

The Virgin Islands are also home to several non-venomous snake species, including the ground snake, Mona boa Virgin Islands tree boa and blind snake (Typhlops richardii). While the green- and hawksbill turtles are found throughout the U.S.V.I., the leatherback turtle is mostly observed on Saint Croix, and in large aggregations around Sandy Point. The largest populations of hawksbill turtles however are found on Buck Island and the east end of Saint Croix.

Native lizards such as anole, ameiva and geckos are easily observed from the Cas Cay Wildlife Sanctuary and Cas Cay Island, a tropical island a few miles south of Red Hook. The Cas Cay Wildlife Sanctuary is a part of the 680-acre Mangrove Lagoon Marine Reserve and Wildlife Sanctuary, which is a protected area in eastern Saint Thomas with various native species.

== Amphibians ==
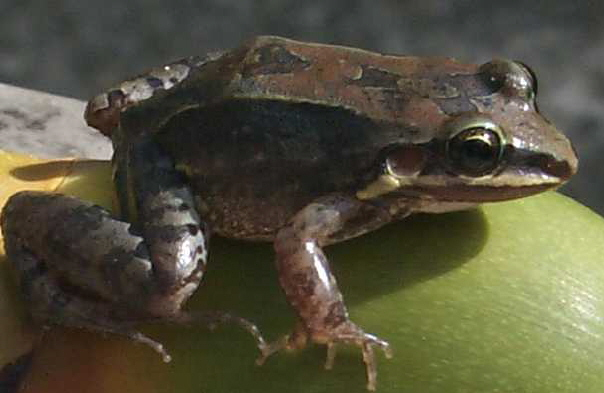
A Hispaniolan ditch frog.

Amphibians in the U.S.V.I. include several species of frogs and toads, including the Virgin Islands coqui, Cuban tree frog, giant neotropical toad, common coquí, red-eyed coqui, Whistling coqui, Puerto Rican crested toad, Hispaniolan ditch frog and the yellow mottled coqui, which is only found in the United States Virgin Islands. Coquí is the local name used for the most common group of tree frogs found in the Virgin Islands and neighboring Commonwealth of Puerto Rico. Of the sixteen species once recorded on Puerto Rico, it is estimated that three species became extinct in the late 1900s.

Most of the amphibians in the U.S.V.I. are residents of freshwater lakes, streams and wetlands, including for instance the Mangrove Lagoon and Benner Bay Pond on Saint Thomas; the 500-acre Great Pond and the Creque Dam on Saint Croix; and the Reef Bay Waterfall- and Pool, Francis Bay Pond and Saltpond Bay on Saint John.

== Land mammals ==
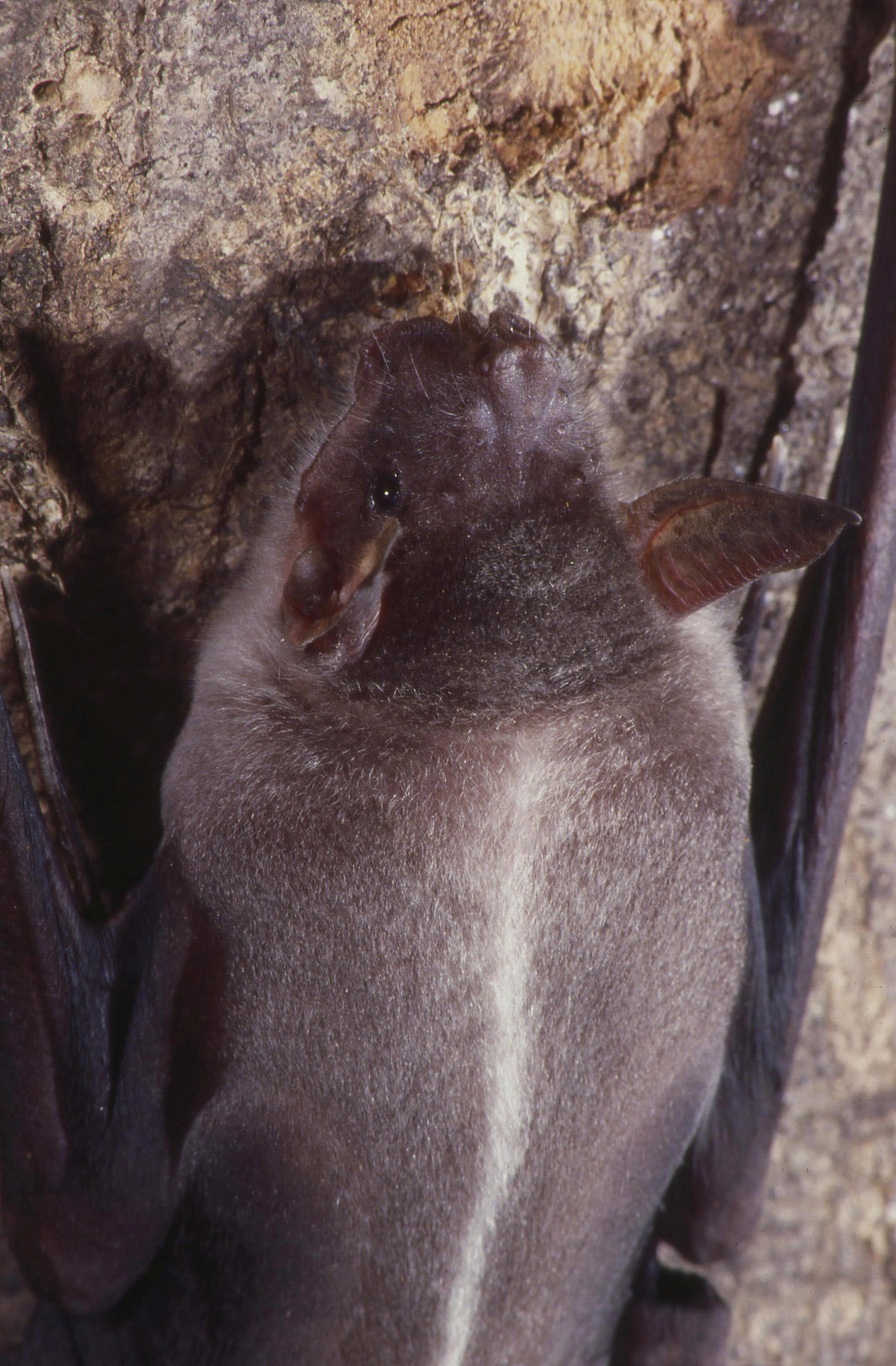
The greater bulldog bat is among the seven bats that are native to the islands.

While there is an abundance of sea mammals, the only native land mammal found in the U.S.V.I. is the bat, in which there are seven different species: red fig-eating bat, greater bulldog bat, Jamaican fruit-eating bat, Antillean fruit-eating bat, velvety free-tailed bat, Miller's long-tongued bat, and the Brazilian free-tailed bat. Three of these are protected under the Virgin Islands Endangered and Indigenous Species Act of 1990.

Of the non-native mammals, the white-tailed deer was introduced to the islands during the 1700s, while feral hogs and dogs were introduced by natives during the Pre-Columbian era. European settlers later introduced domesticated species such as donkeys, sheep, goats, horses, chickens, cats, and also local pests such as the rat and the small Asian mongoose.

The small Asian mongoose has been blamed for numerous native extinctions and has reached a density of two animals per acre across the U.S. Virgin Islands. While the small Asian mongoose was introduced in the 1800s to control rat populations, the white-tailed deer was imported for deer hunting purposes in the late 1700s and again through the Pittman-Robertson Federal Aid in Wildlife Restoration Act of 1937.

== Marine life ==
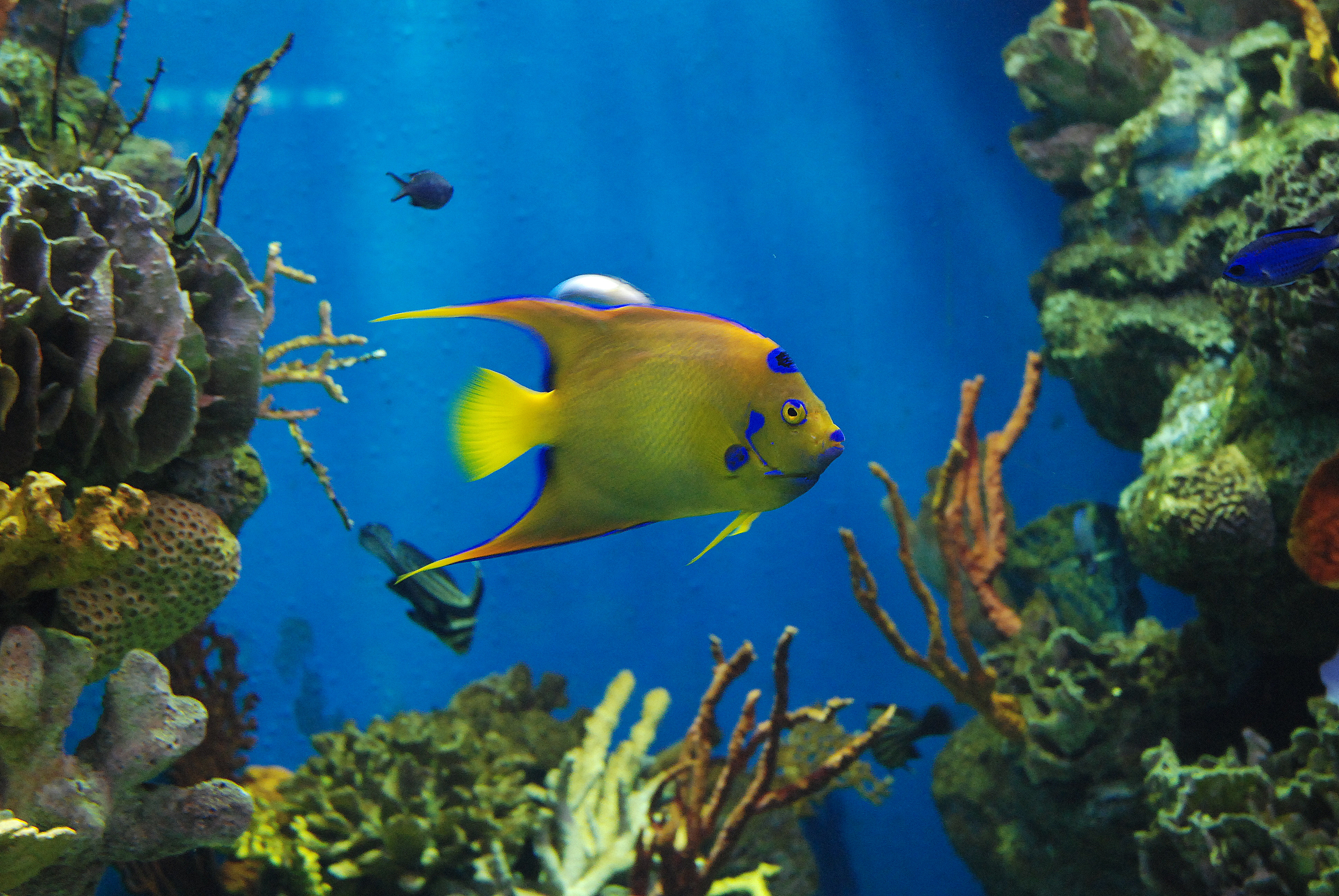
A Queen angelfish.

The waters off the United States Virgin Islands are among the most productive in the world and host a variety of marine mammals, fish, sea turtles, corals, seabirds and invertebrates. More than 500 fish species have been recorded in the waters surrounding the archipelago, including for instance parrotfish, hogfish, surgeon fish, butterflyfish, squirrelfish, damselfish, fairy basslet, hawkfish, spotted drum, porcupinefish, barracuda, blue chromis, snapper, Creole wrasse, hamlet, French grunt, filefish, goby, wahoo, Atlantic blue marlin, and hundreds of others.

The U.S.V.I is home to 386 square miles of coral reefs, which is more than twice the archipelago's total landmass and is a critical habitat for hundreds of tropical fish species and coral species. The coral reefs also provide habitat for mollusks, sea urchins, sea fans, sea anemones and sponges. Some of the coral species found here are the elkhorn coral, brain coral, pillar coral, staghorn coral, fire coral, sea whips, star coral and finger coral. Along the many coral reefs are also numerous crabs, lobsters, parrot fish, damselfish, goatfish, wrasse, triggerfish, trunkfish, trumpet fish, angelfish, squid, sea turtles and octopus.

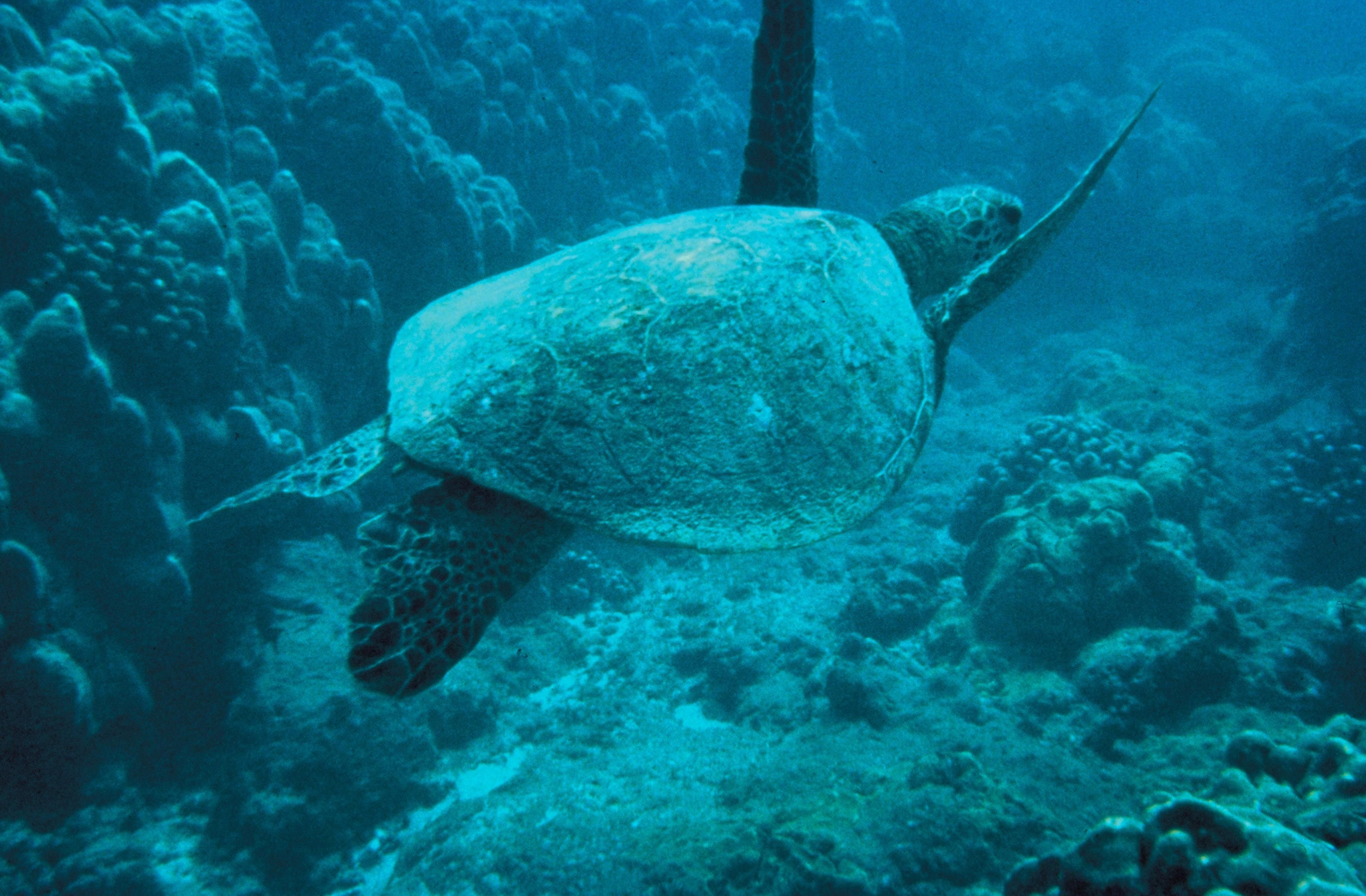
A green sea turtle.

Among the larger marine mammals are species such as the endangered West Indian manatee and humpback whale, as well as sixteen other species of whales and dolphins, including the pantropical spotted dolphin, common bottlenose dolphin, Atlantic spotted dolphin, Clymene dolphin, spinner dolphin, striped dolphin, rough-toothed dolphin, Risso's dolphin, melon-headed whale, pygmy killer whale, false killer whale, and the short-finned pilot whale.

Shark species include the Caribbean reef shark, lemon shark, bull shark, tiger shark, hammerhead shark, silky shark, nurse shark, blacktip shark, and the great white shark. There are many areas of large tropical fish populations, including by Waterlemon Cay in Leinster Bay, which provides habitat for sergeant major, blue chromis, parrotfish, queen triggerfish and queen angelfish. Another island visited for its tropical fish- and bird life is Buck Island, a 19015-acre marine protected district, which offers great diversity of coral.

The rocky Limestone Beach on Water Island is also a popular area for scuba divers and snorkelers with its huge number of tropical fish. Coral World's Underwater Observatory on Saint Thomas offers views from a natural coral reef and is a 360-degree underwater observatory with fish species such as trumpetfish, grouper, squirrelfish, barracudas, seahorses, garden eels, cherubfish, moray eels, octopus, parrotfish, palometa and mojarra.

== Avifauna ==
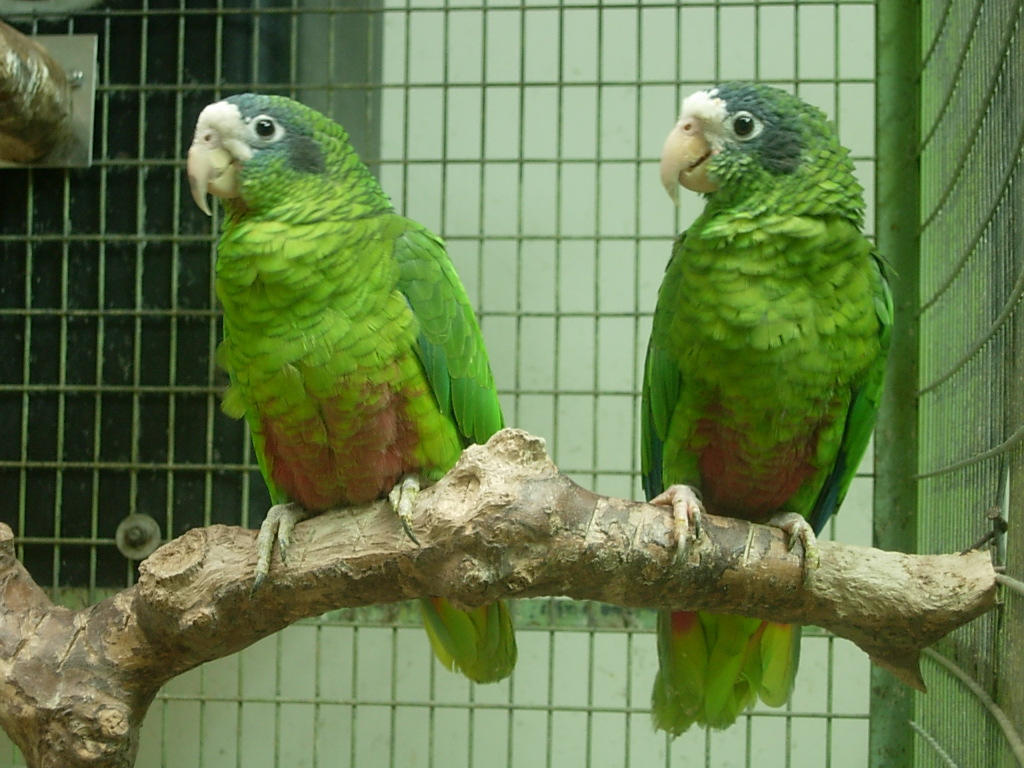
Hispaniolan amazon

Birds of the United States Virgin Islands include at least 144 species, including numerous tropical Caribbean birds, wood warblers, various seabirds and hawks. Some of the tropical species include the brown-throated parakeet, Hispaniolan parrot and three species of hummingbirds: the green-throated carib, Antillean crested hummingbird and Puerto Rican mango. Raptors include four species of hawks: the fish hawk, marsh hawk, sharp-shinned hawk and red-tailed hawk, and three species of falcons, including the American kestrel, merlin and peregrine falcon, as well as two species of owls, the Puerto Rican owl and the short-eared owl.

Saba Island, three miles south of Charlotte Amalie, has the largest colony of seabirds in the Virgin Islands Archipelago with more than 30,000 sooty terns and smaller populations of roseate terns, an endangered species, as well as brown noddies, bridled terns, low-crowned night herons, black-necked stilts and yellow warblers. Another popular area for bird watching, particularly during winter time, is Francis Bay on Saint John, which is home to more than 160 species of birds.

== See also ==
- Fauna of the United States
