= Tod Sirod Reef =

- Location within Florida Location within the Caribbean

Location
- Location: Gulf of Mexico
- Coordinates: 26°7.771′N 82°2.290′W
- Country: United States

Geology
- Type: artificial reef

Tod Sirod Reef, formerly known as Collier 1 Reef is an artificial reef in the Gulf of Mexico, off the coast of Collier County, Florida. It is part of a network of artificial reefs off the coast of the county.

== History ==
Construction of the reef was done by a public-private partnership in 2015. In total 36 artificial reefs off the Collier County coastline has been created in six new reef areas.

New reef areas
Reef Name	Location	GPS
Wasmer Reef	10 nautical miles from Gordon Pass	26°01.973'N 81°58.557'W
Foote Family Reef	17 nautical miles from Gordon Pass	26°01.205'N 82°06.586'W
Collier #1 aka Tod Sirod Reef	10 nautical miles from Gordon Pass	26°07.771'N 82°02.290'W
Collier #2	14 nautical miles from Gordon Pass	26°03.731'N 82°03.316'W
Marco #1	16 nautical miles from Marco Pass	25°41.700'N 81°46.880'W
Rooney Reef	26.6 nautical miles from Marco Pass	25°54.244'N 82°14.258'W

== Structure ==
The reef is composed of pyramid-shaped limestone reef modules and old concrete benches.

== Marine life ==
Since their installation, the reef structure has been colonized by many forms of marine life including giant anemones and symbiotic cleaner shrimp, wing-oysters, tunicates, soft coral, algae, variegated and rock-boring urchins, and sea cucumbers. Fish observed at the reef include mangrove and lane snappers, sheepshead, spadefish, jack-knifefish, butterfly fish, grouper, angelfish, wrasse, and grunts.
