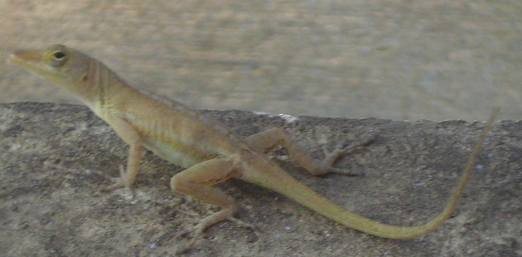

Conservation status
- Least Concern (IUCN 3.1)

Scientific classification
- Kingdom: Animalia
- Phylum: Chordata
- Class: Reptilia
- Order: Squamata
- Suborder: Iguania
- Family: Dactyloidae
- Genus: Anolis
- Species: A. acutus

Binomial name
- Anolis acutus Hallowell, 1856

= Anolis acutus =

Species of lizard

Anolis acutus), the St. Croix's anole or sharp anole, is a species of lizard belonging to the family Dactyloidae, the anoles. This is an arboreal lizard which is endemic to the islands of the Saint Croix bank in the United States Virgin Islands.

== Taxonomy ==
Anolis acutus was first formally described in 1856 by the American herpetologist and physician Edward Hallowell with its type locality given as "Cuba?". Later the type locality was designated as Christiansted on St Croix by James D. Lazell Jr.. This species is in the A. cristatellus species complex of the genus Anolis which is classified in the family Dactyloidae.

== Description ==
Anolis acutus are a uniform tan to olive in color. The chinflaps are white with a sizeable yellowish-orange blotch near to the body. The males have an average SVL of 67 mm (2.6 in) while in females it is around 49 mm (1.9 in).

== Distribution and habitat ==
Anolis acutus is found only on the island of St Croix, and the adjacent islets of Buck Island, Protestant Cay and Green Cay in the United States Virgin Islands. It is found in dry to mesic forest, pastures with scattered trees and residential areas.

== Biology ==
Anolis acutus are arboreal perching on trees, bushes and other elevated sites from just above the ground up to 3 m (9.8 ft). The adults exclude juveniles from trees. These are territorial lizrds and, if an adult is removed from its tree, it will become agitated until it is returned or it is replaced by another adult. The St Croix anole is oviparous. These lizards are diurnal, being active from just prior to dawn to just after dusk with no activity or basking peaks. The females can breed throughout the year but there is less breeding activity in January to April, with most breeding being conducted in the months with higher rainfall. The females lay a single egg at atime, burying it in sand or gavelly soil, the eggs hatch in around 14 days.

== See also ==
- List of Anolis lizards
