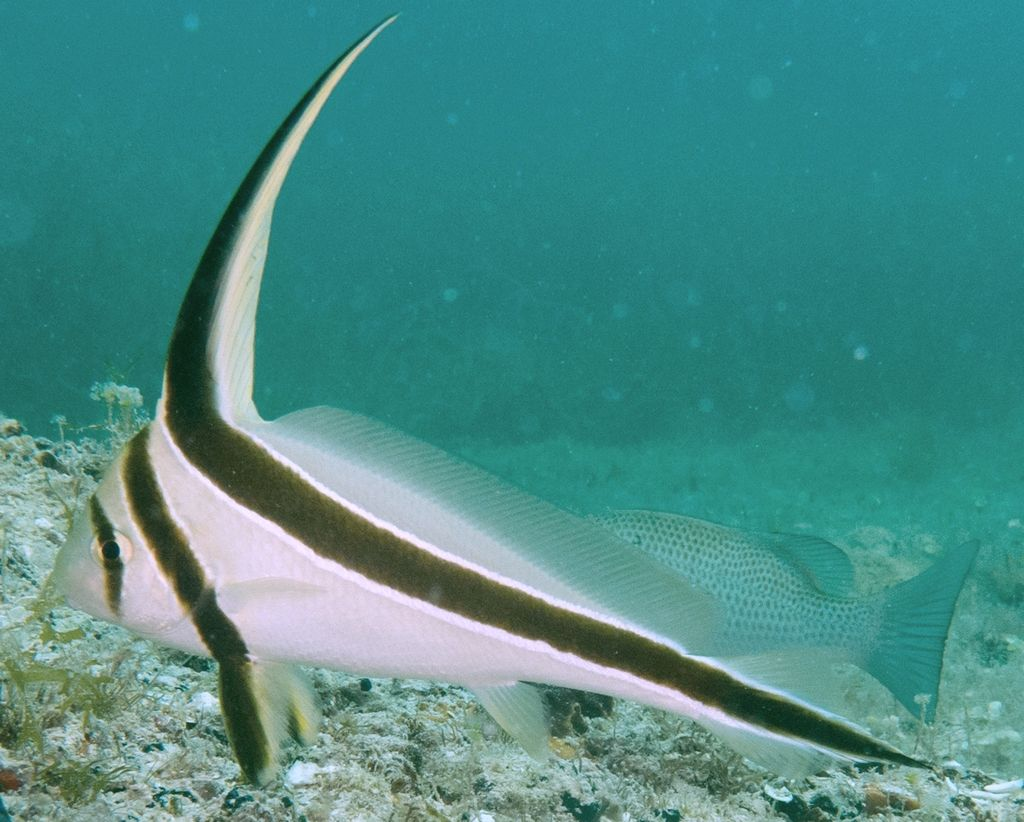

Conservation status
- Least Concern (IUCN 3.1)

Scientific classification
- Kingdom: Animalia
- Phylum: Chordata
- Class: Actinopterygii
- Division: Teleostei
- Order: Acanthuriformes
- Family: Sciaenidae
- Genus: Eques; Bloch, 1793
- Species: E. lanceolatus

Binomial name
- Eques lanceolatus (Linnaeus, 1758)
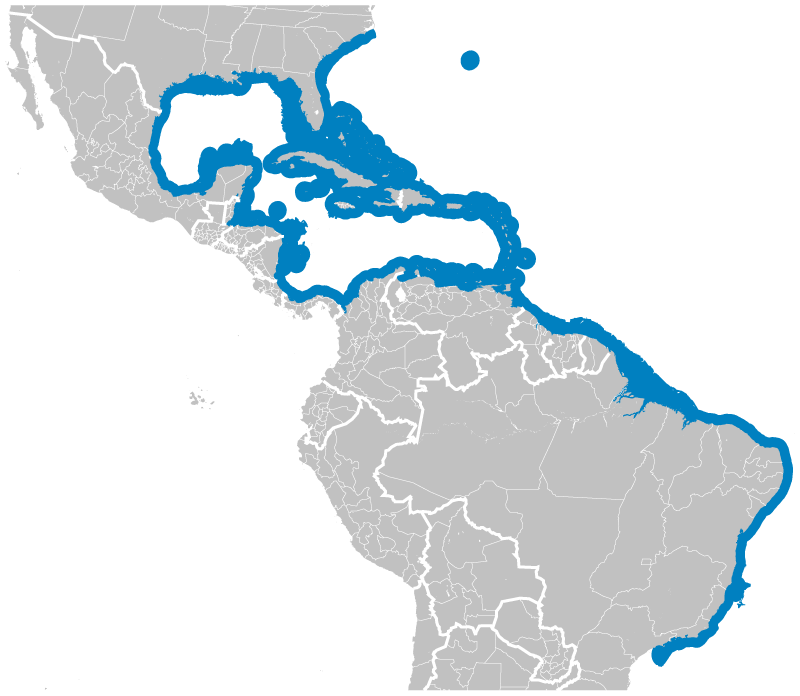
- Jack-knifefish range.

Synonyms
- Chaetodon lanceolatus Linnaeus, 1758; Equetus lanceolatus (Linnaeus, 1758); Eques americanus Bloch, 1793; Eques balteatus Cuvier, 1829

= Jack-knifefish =

Species of fish

The jack-knifefish (Eques lanceolatus) is a species of marine ray-finned fish belonging to the family Sciaenidae, the drums and croakers. It is native to the western Atlantic Ocean, where its distribution extends along the eastern coasts of the Americas from the Carolinas in the United States to Brazil, including the Caribbean. Other common names include donkey fish and lance-shaped ribbonfish.

== Taxonomy ==
The jack-knifefish was first formally described as Chaetodon lanceolatus in 1758 by Carl Linnaeus in the 10th edition of his Systema Naturae with its type locality given, erroneously as India, when it should have been the Bahamas. In 1793 the German physician and naturalist Marcus Elieser Bloch described a new species, Eques americanus, from the Western Atlantic and placed it in the new monospecific genus Eques. Bloch's genus name was considered to be preoccupied by a name Linnaeus had used for a subgenus of Papilio, and Constantine Samuel Rafinesque created Equites to replace Bloch's Eques, however, Linnaeus's name is considered to be invalid so Eques is now considered valid. Fishbase treats the genus as monospecific with this species as the only species but other authorities include the spotted drum (Equetus punctatus) in the genus, treating Equetus as a synonym of Eques. This taxon has been placed in the subfamily Sciaeninae by some workers, but the 5th edition of Fishes of the World does not recognise subfamilies within the Sciaenidae which it places in the order Acanthuriformes.

== Description ==
This fish reaches about 25 centimeters in maximum length. The first dorsal fin is very tall. The body is gray in color with three brown or black bands. The first two bands are small and vertical, and the third extends from the tip of the tall dorsal fin down the body to the tip of the tail fin.

== Habitat ==
This marine fish is mostly found along coasts in waters up to 60 meters deep, especially in reef habitat.

== Biology ==
This species feeds on small invertebrates, and sometimes detritus.

== Uses ==
This species is sometimes kept in marine aquaria. It can be bred in captivity.

== Conservation ==
This species is not considered to be threatened. The aquarium trade does not significantly impact populations, even though it is valuable and easy to collect from the wild. It has a wide distribution, and in many areas it is a common species.
