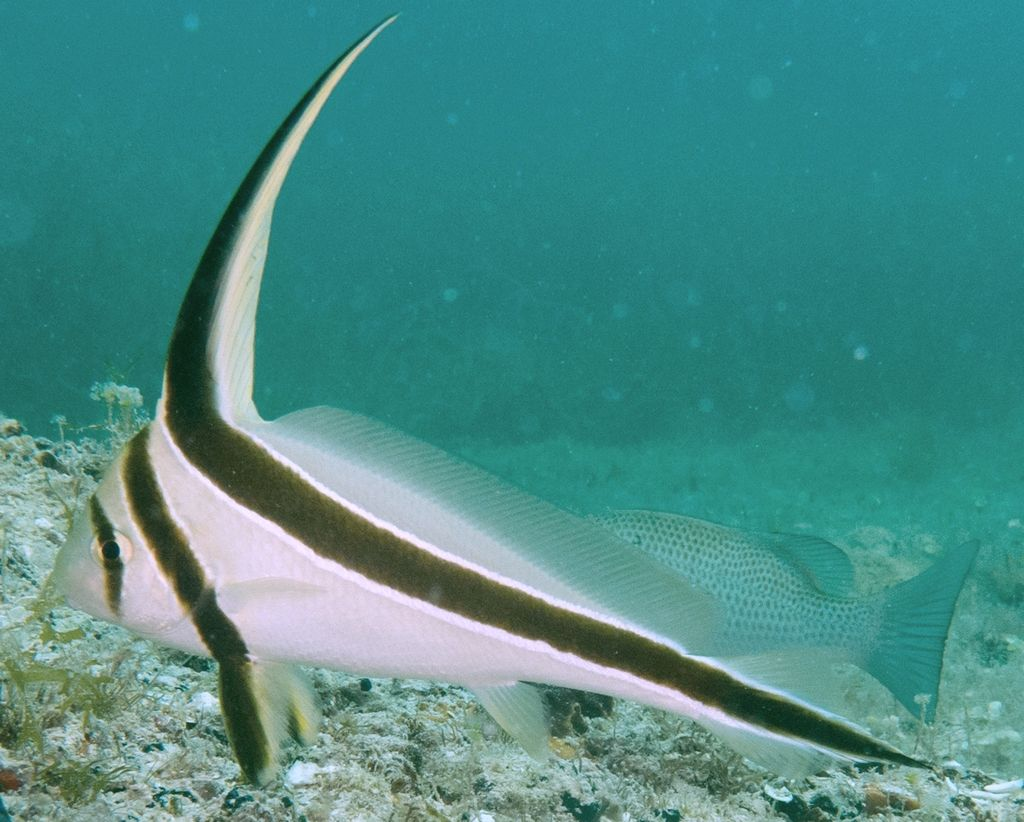
- Jack-knifefish (Eques lanceolatus)

Scientific classification
- Kingdom: Animalia
- Phylum: Chordata
- Class: Actinopterygii
- Order: Acanthuriformes
- Family: Sciaenidae
- Genus: Eques; Bloch, 1793

Type species
- Eques americanus Bloch, 1793

Synonyms
- Equetus Rafinesque, 1815

= Eques (fish) =

Small genus of marine ray-finned fishes

Eques is a small genus of marine ray-finned fishes belonging to the family Sciaenidae, the drums and croakers. These fishes are found in the Western Atlantic Ocean.

== Taxonomy ==
Eques was first proposed as a monospecific genus in 1793 by the German physician and naturalist Marcus Elieser Bloch with its type species Eques americanus, which Bloch was describing as a new species from the Western Atlantic. In 1815 Constantine Samuel Rafinesque proposed the new name Equetus for the genus as Eques had been used for a subgenus of Lepidoptera by Linnaeus but Linnaeus's name has been deemed to be invalid under the International Code of Zoological Nomenclature so Rafinesque's replacement name was not needed. This genus has been placed in the subfamily Sciaeninae by some workers, but the 5th edition of Fishes of the World does not recognise subfamilies within the Sciaenidae which it places in the order Acanthuriformes.

== Species ==
Eques contains two valid species:

- Eques lanceolatus (Linnaeus, 1758) (Jack-knifefish)
- Eques punctatus (Bloch & Schneider, 1801) (Spotted drum)

== Characteristics ==
Eques drums have an oblong body that is deep anteriorly and tapers towards the caudal peduncle. The snout protrudes over the horizontal mouth. There are 5 pores and no barbels on the chin. The preoperculum has weak serrations along its edge and the upper angle of the operculum is incised. They have a long-based dorsal fin which is deeply incised, the incision separates the spiny portion from the soft rayed portion of the fin. The spiny portion of the dorsal fin is very high with the spines being longer than the head and the soft rayed part is supported by more than 45 rays. The anal fin is short-based with 2 spines, the second spine being robust, and 6 soft rays. The lateral line extends to the centre of the caudal fin. Theare are wide oblique black bars on the body. The two species in the genus are similar in size with maximum published total lengths of 25 cm (9.8 in) for E. lanceolatus and 25 cm (9.8 in) for E. punctatus.

== Distribution and habitat ==
Eques drums are found in the Western Atlantic Ocean from Bermuda and North Carolina south to Rio de Janeiro in Brazil. They are found in association with reefs at depths between 10 and 60 m (33 and 197 ft).
