= Finger coral =

Finger coral may refer to:

- Acropora humilis (Dana, 1846) in the family Acroporidae
- Montipora digitata Pallas 1766 in the family Acroporidae
- Porites compressa Pallas 1766 in the family Poritidae
- Porites porites Pallas 1766 in the family Poritidae
- species of the genus Seriatopora
