= Waterlemon Cay =

Islet in the United States Virgin Islands

Coordinates: 18°22′01″N 64°43′24″W

Waterlemon Cay is a small cay surrounded by a fringing reef located in Leinster Bay on Saint John, U.S. Virgin Islands. It is named after the water lemon.

The cay is surrounded by a fringing reef, and is considered to be one of the best snorkeling spots on the island. A trail leads from the sandy beach at Leinster Bay approximately 1 km (0.62 mi) along the point, from which is a ten-minute swim to the cay, where there is a small beach. The cay boasts a wide variety of reef fishes and coral; however, bleaching is prevalent, and the marine life has decreased in recent times. Many attribute the depletion of Coral reefs of the Virgin Islands to high rates of erosion and runoff caused by the construction boom on the Islands.

== History ==
Local lore states that when dueling was outlawed in the Danish West Indies, the remote strip of sand on Waterlemon Cay became the preferred spot to engage in combat.

== Gallery ==
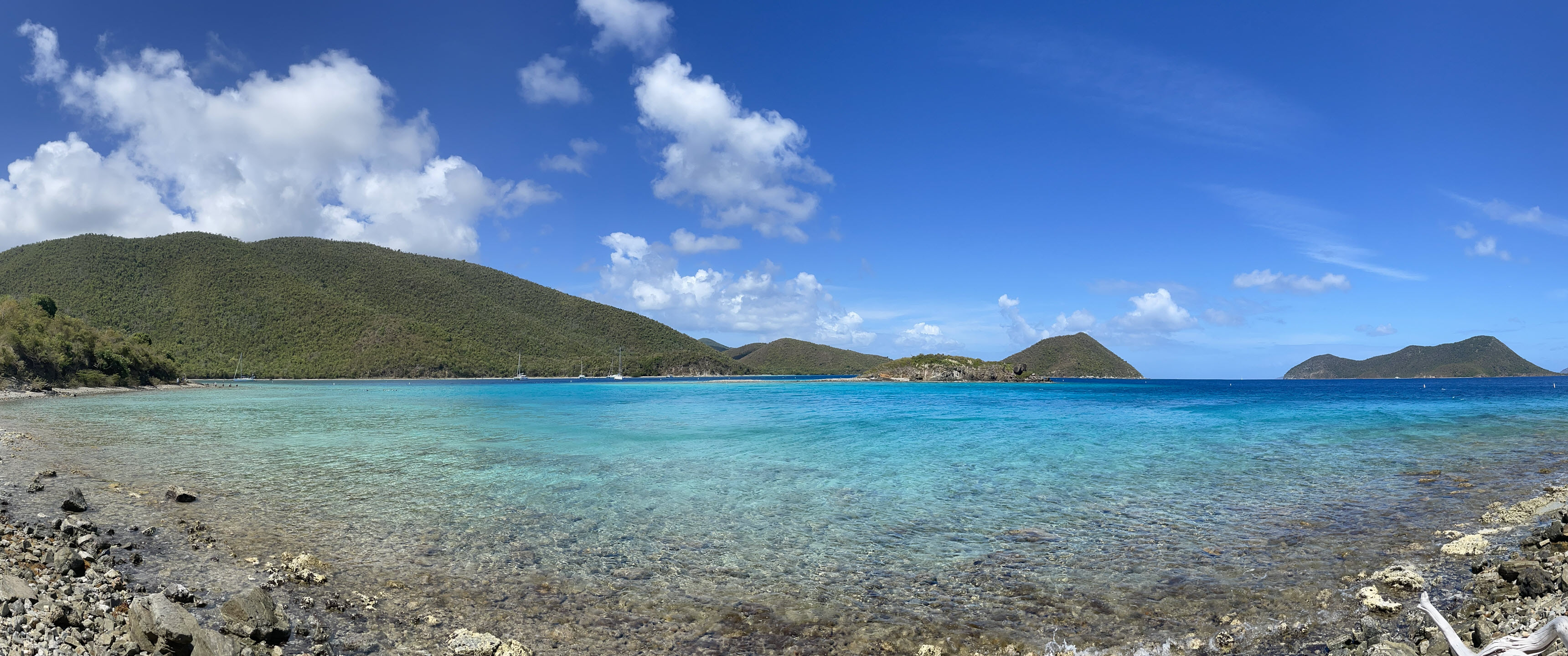
Waterlemon Bay and Cay

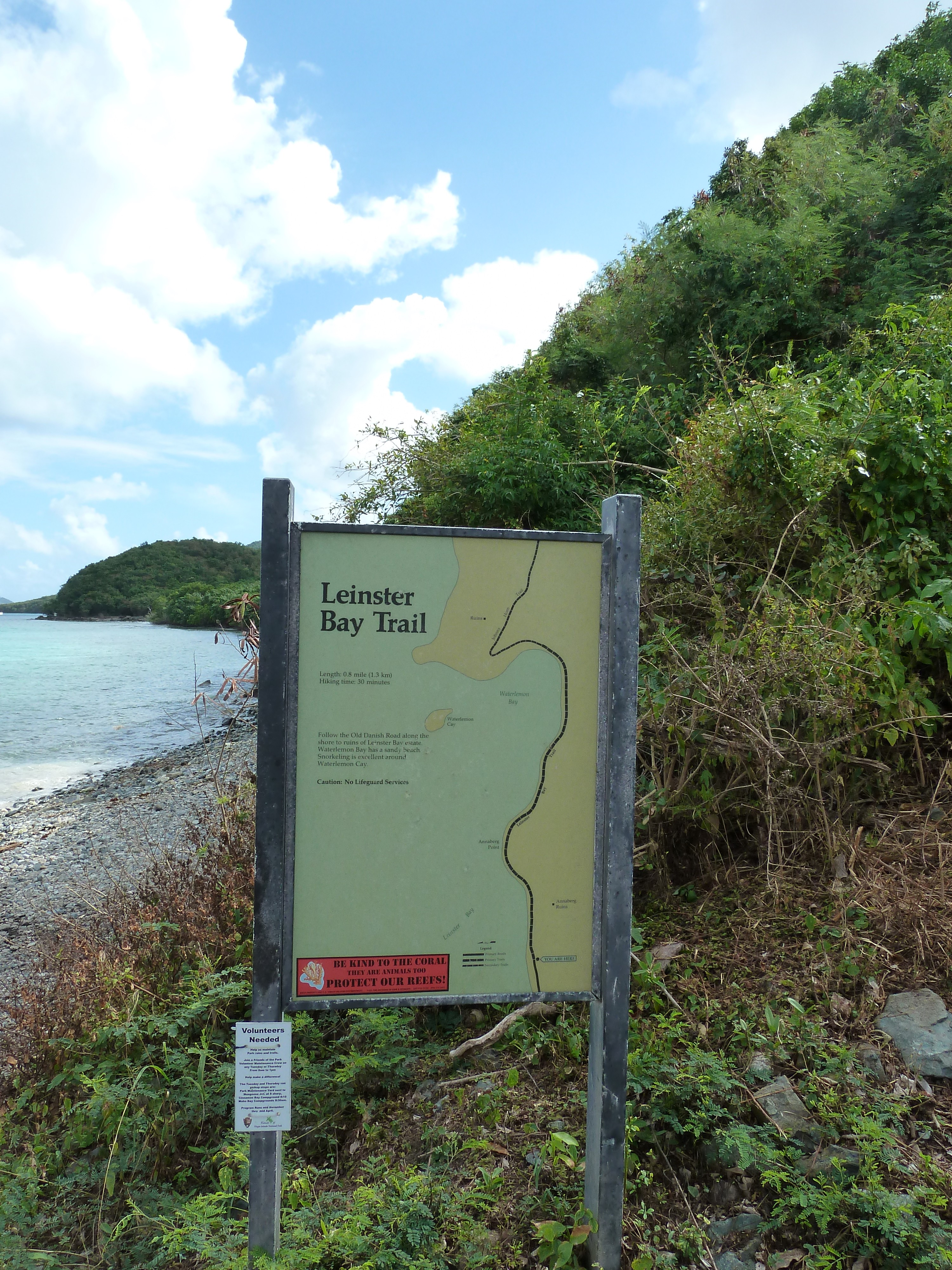
Map of Leinster Bay trail

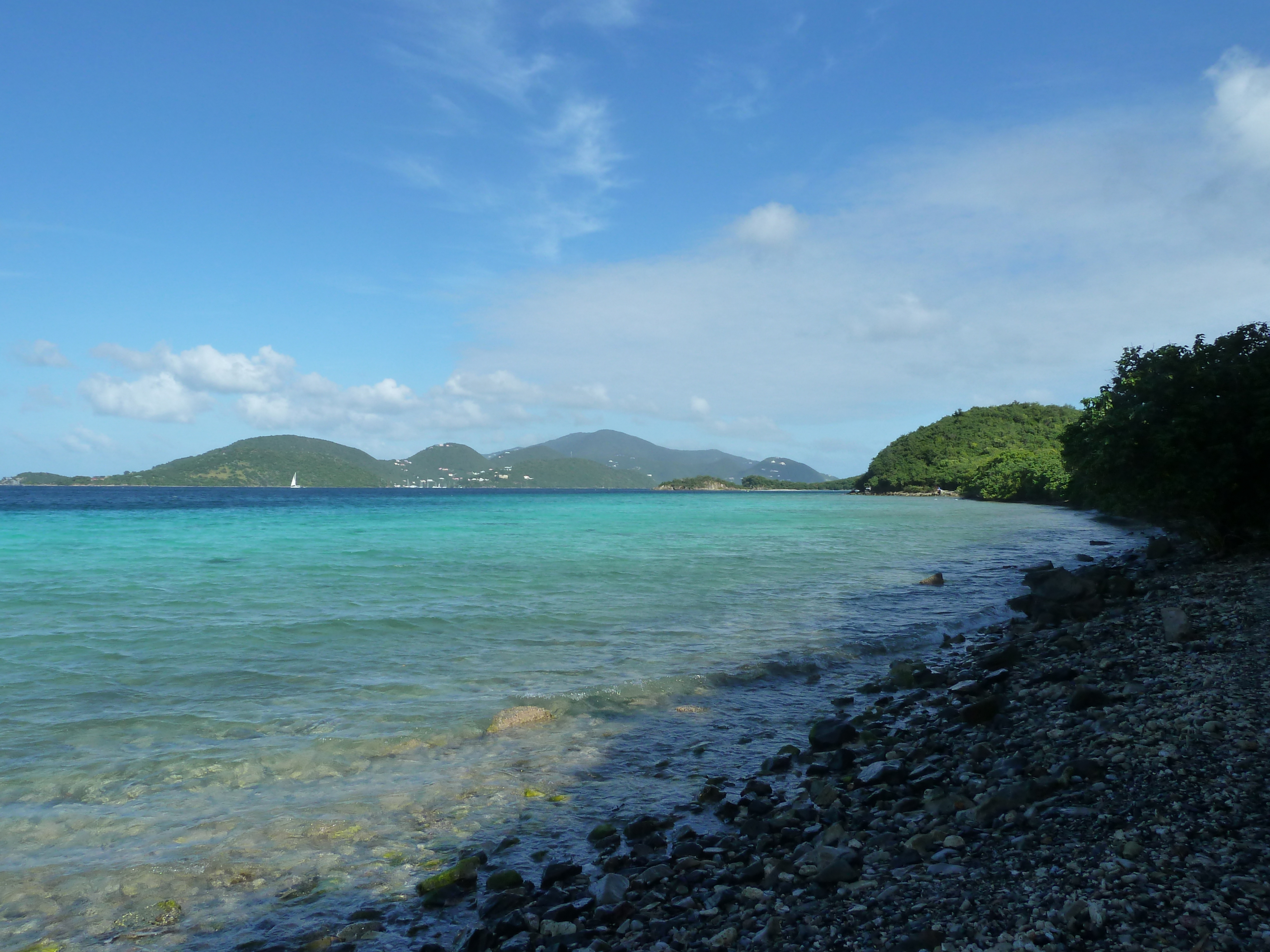
View from Leinster Bay trail, including Waterlemon Cay

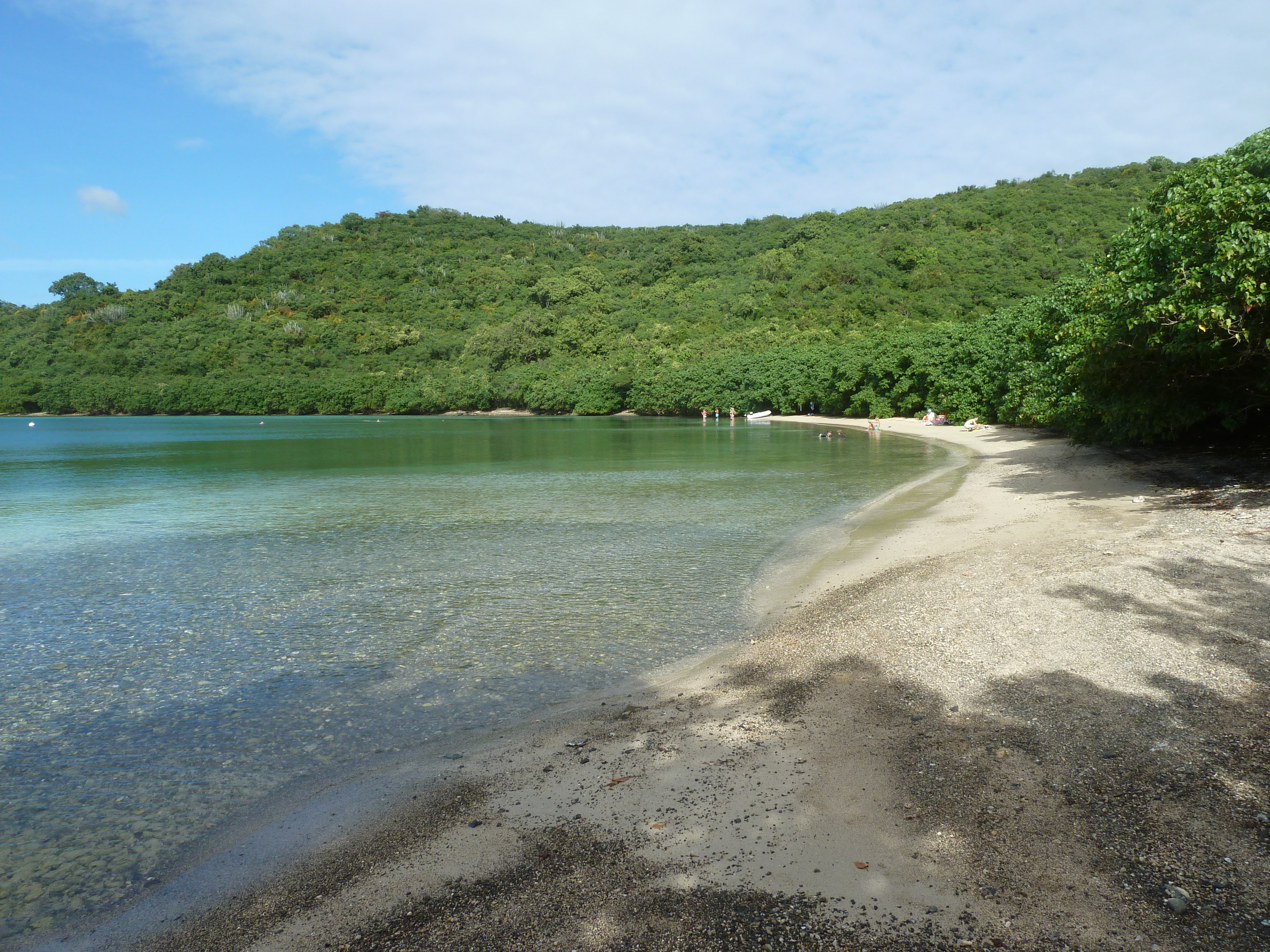
Leinster Bay

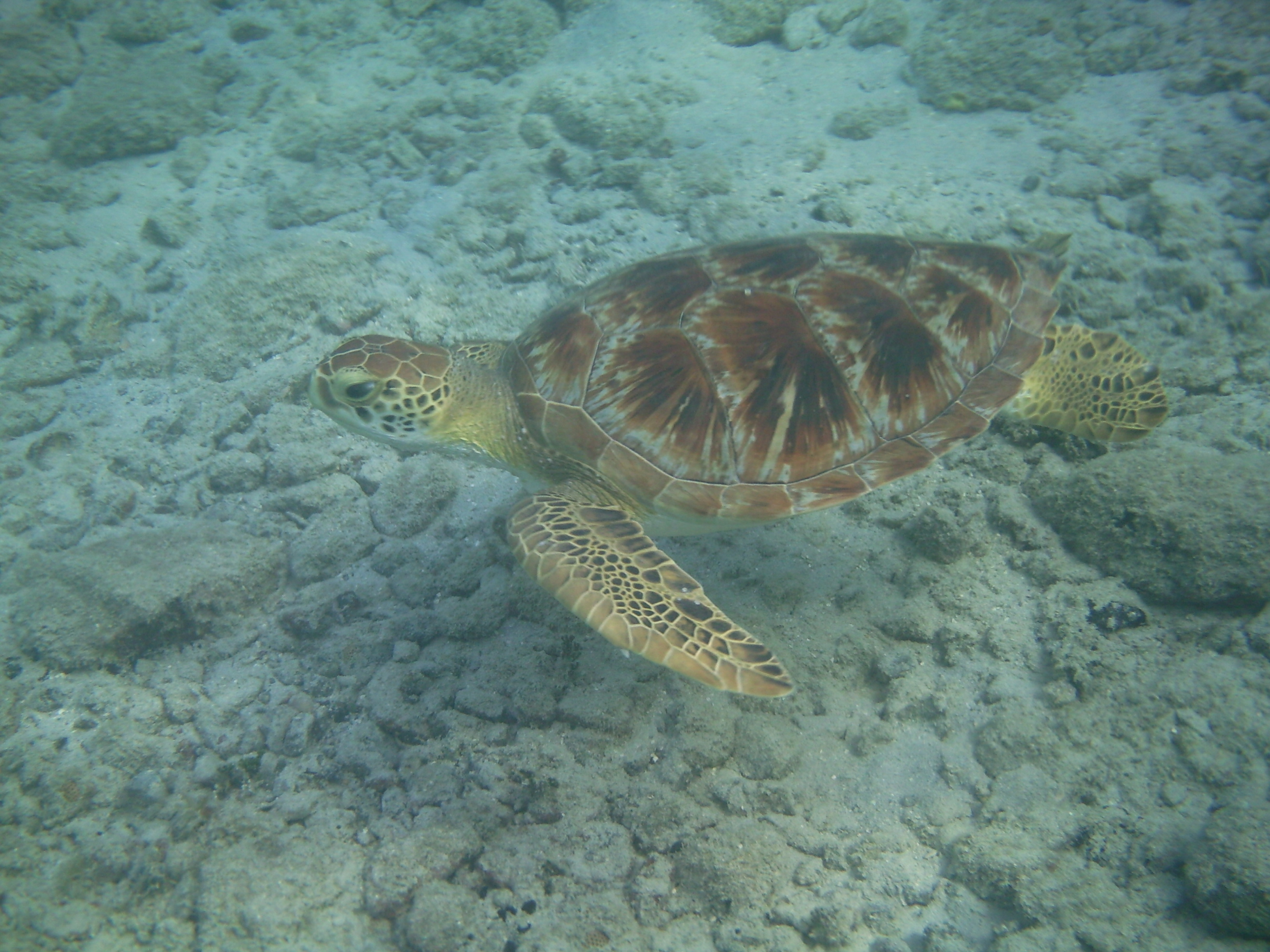
Turtle near Waterlemon Cay
