= Leinster Bay, U.S. Virgin Islands =

Coordinates: 18°21′48″N 64°43′13″W

Leinster Bay is a bay and former sugar cane plantation on the island of Saint John in the United States Virgin Islands. It is uninhabited and part of Virgin Islands National Park. Visitors can park at Annaberg and hike the Leinster Bay trail to access the bay, which is a popular snorkeling spot. Waterlemon Cay is a small cay in Leinster Bay. The ruins of the plantation's estate house can be reached by continuing past the bay and up the Johnny Horn Trail.

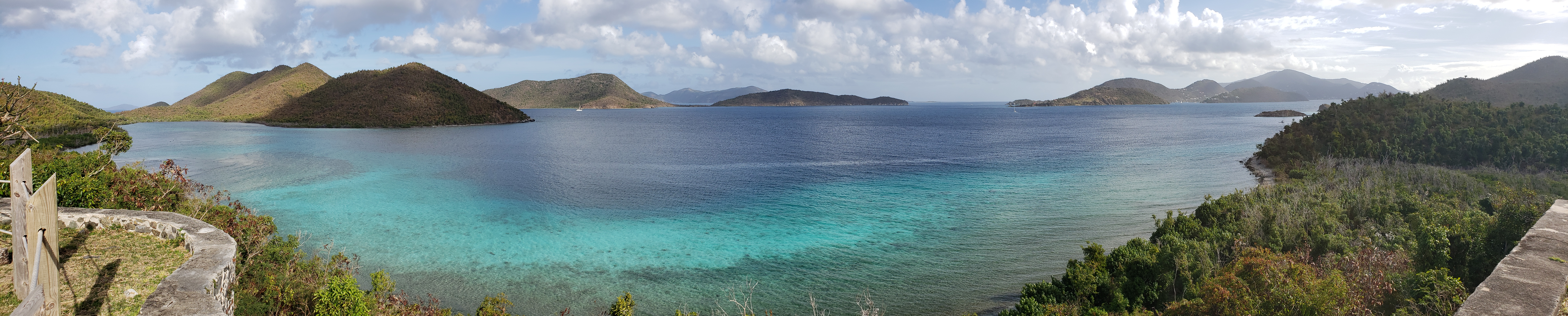
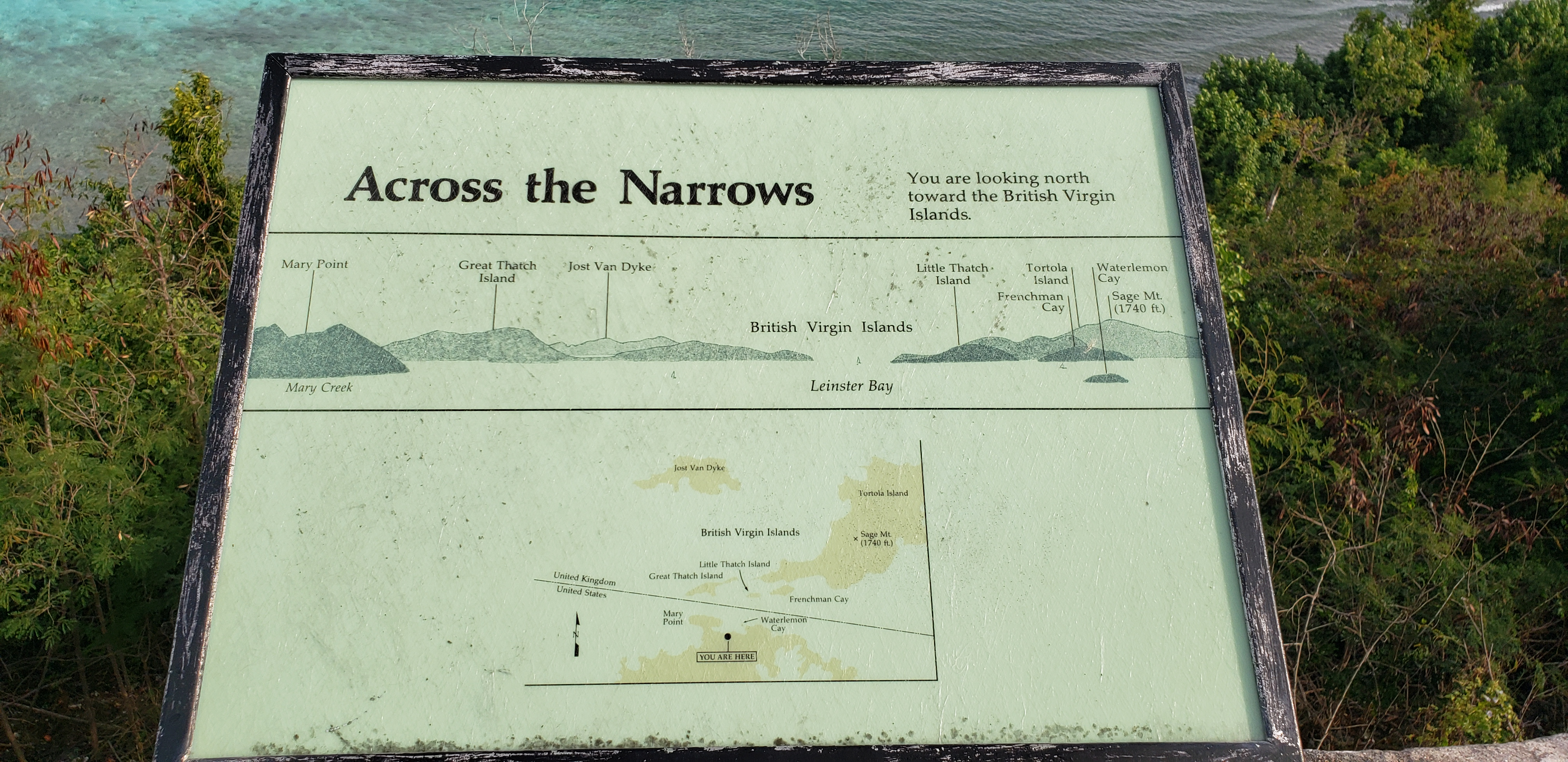
Leinster Bay panorama

== Gallery ==
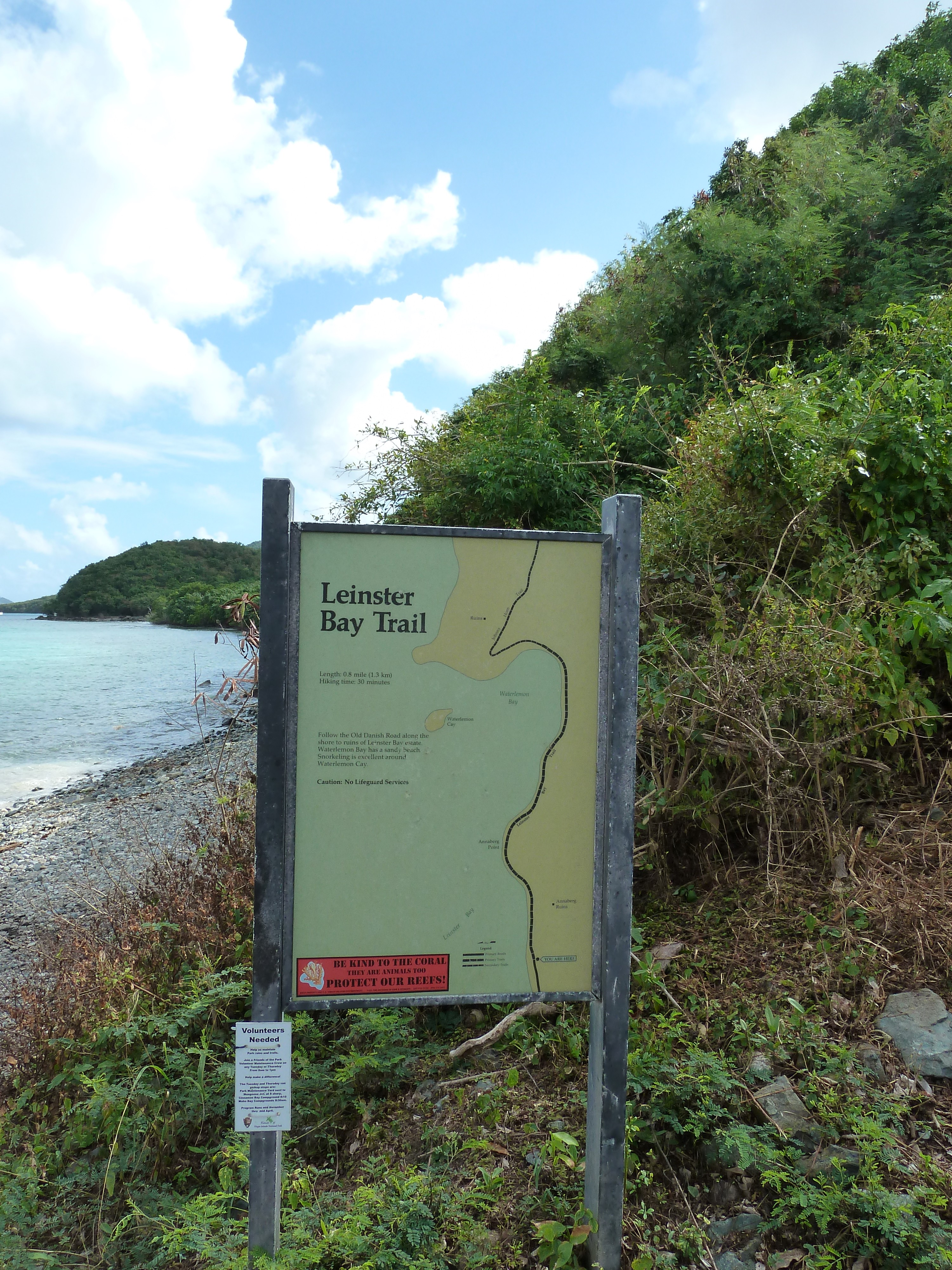
Map of Leinster Bay trail

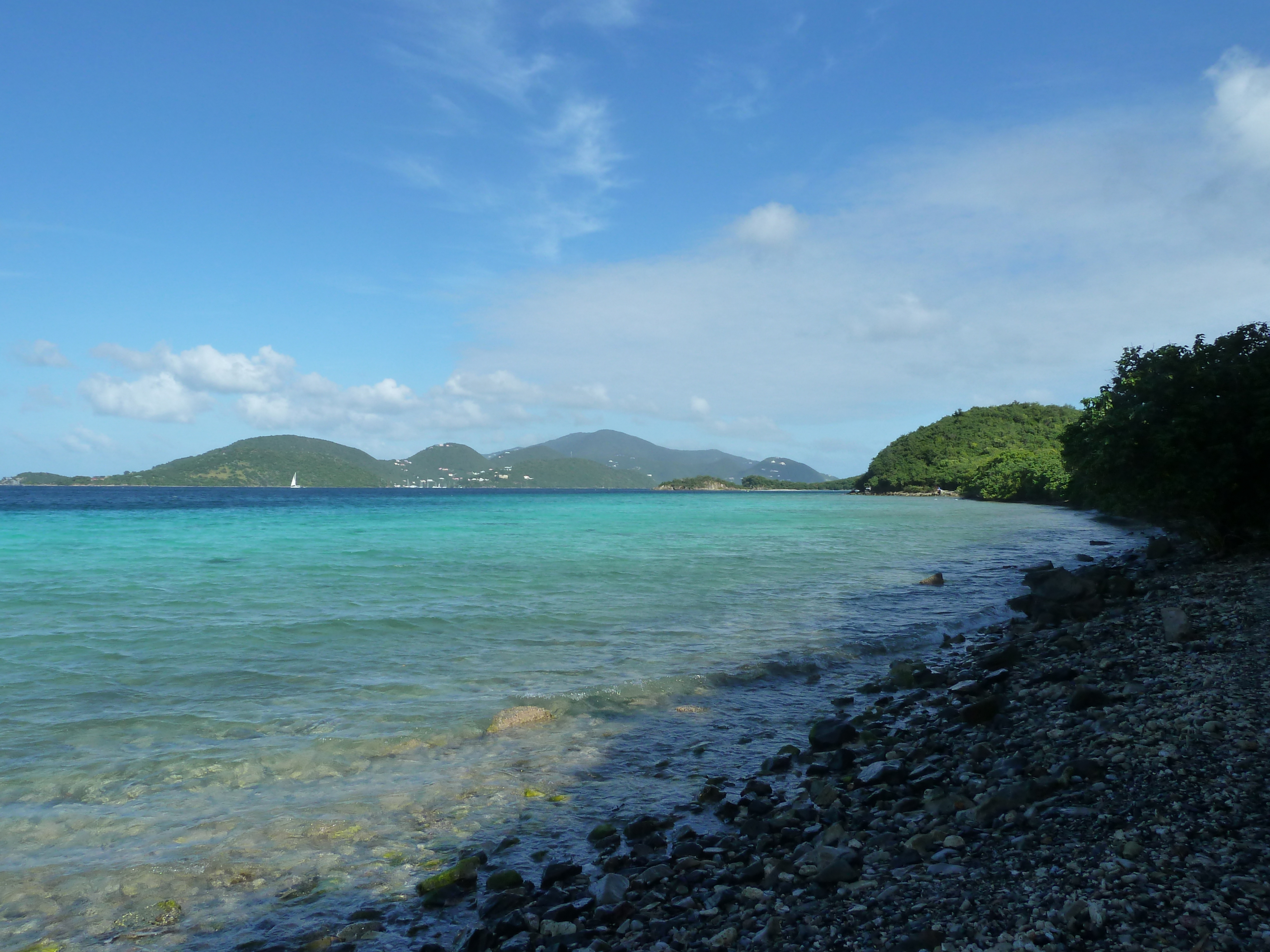
View from Leinster Bay trail, including Waterlemon Cay

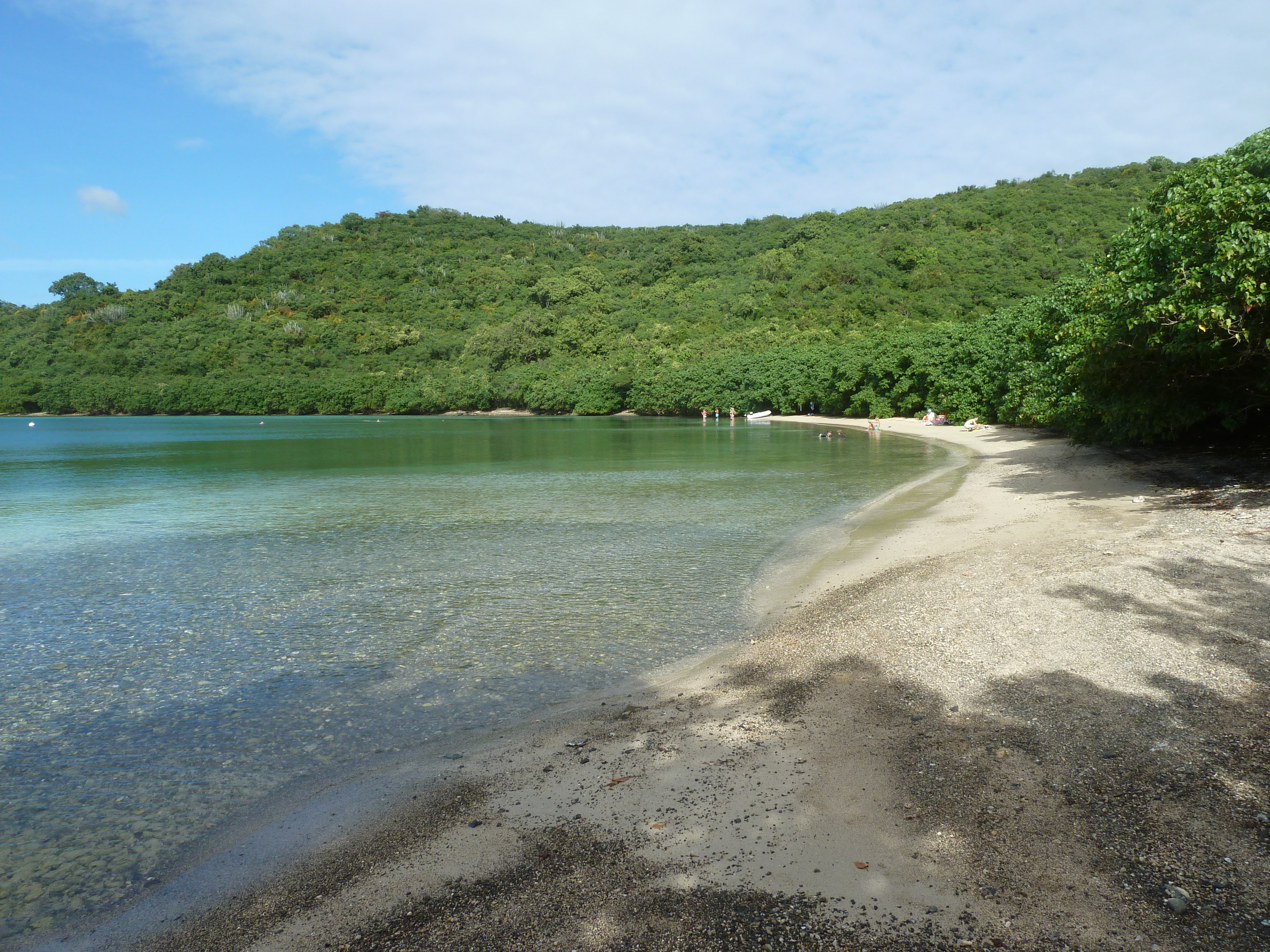
Leinster Bay

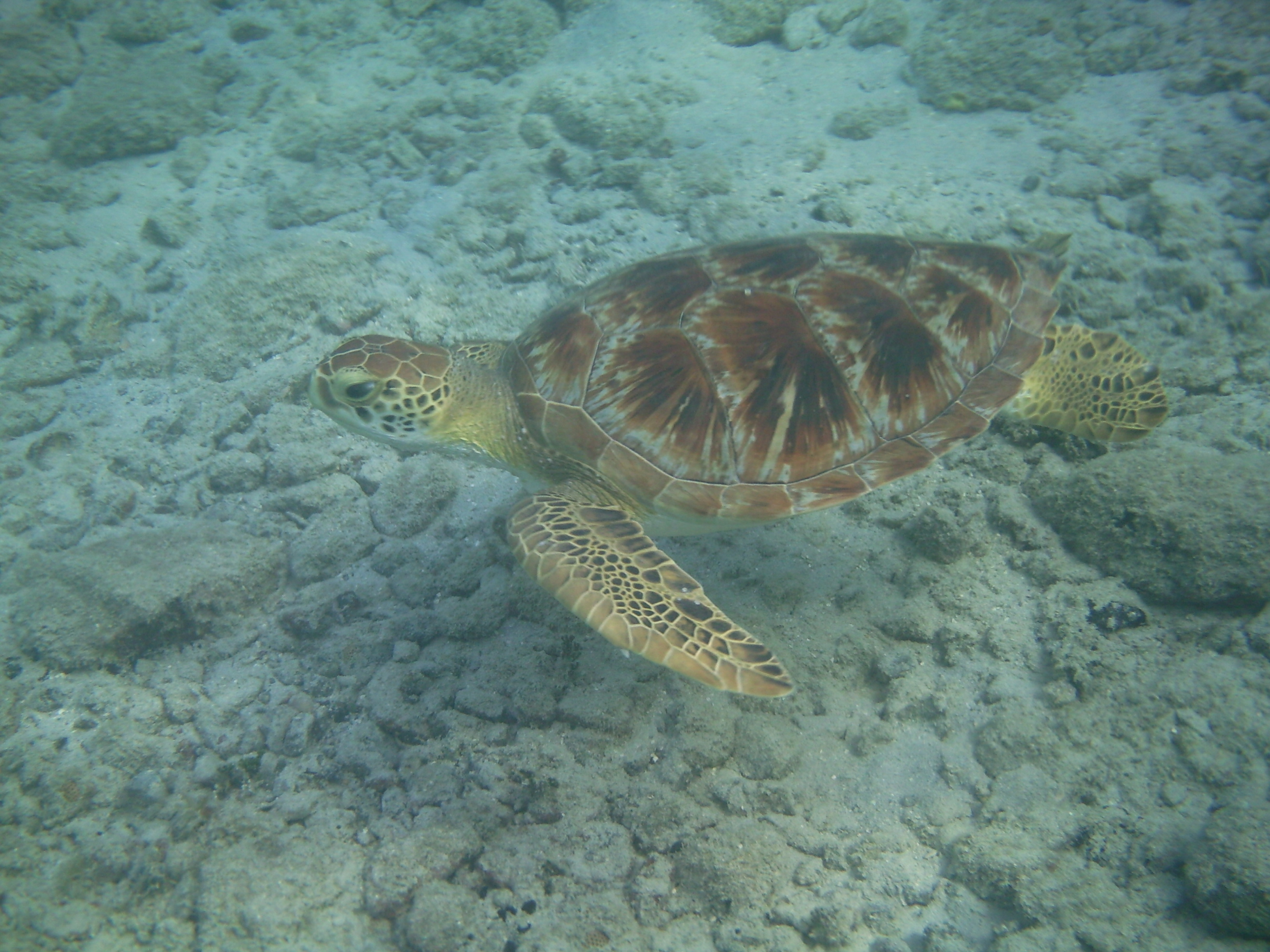
Turtle near Waterlemon Cay
