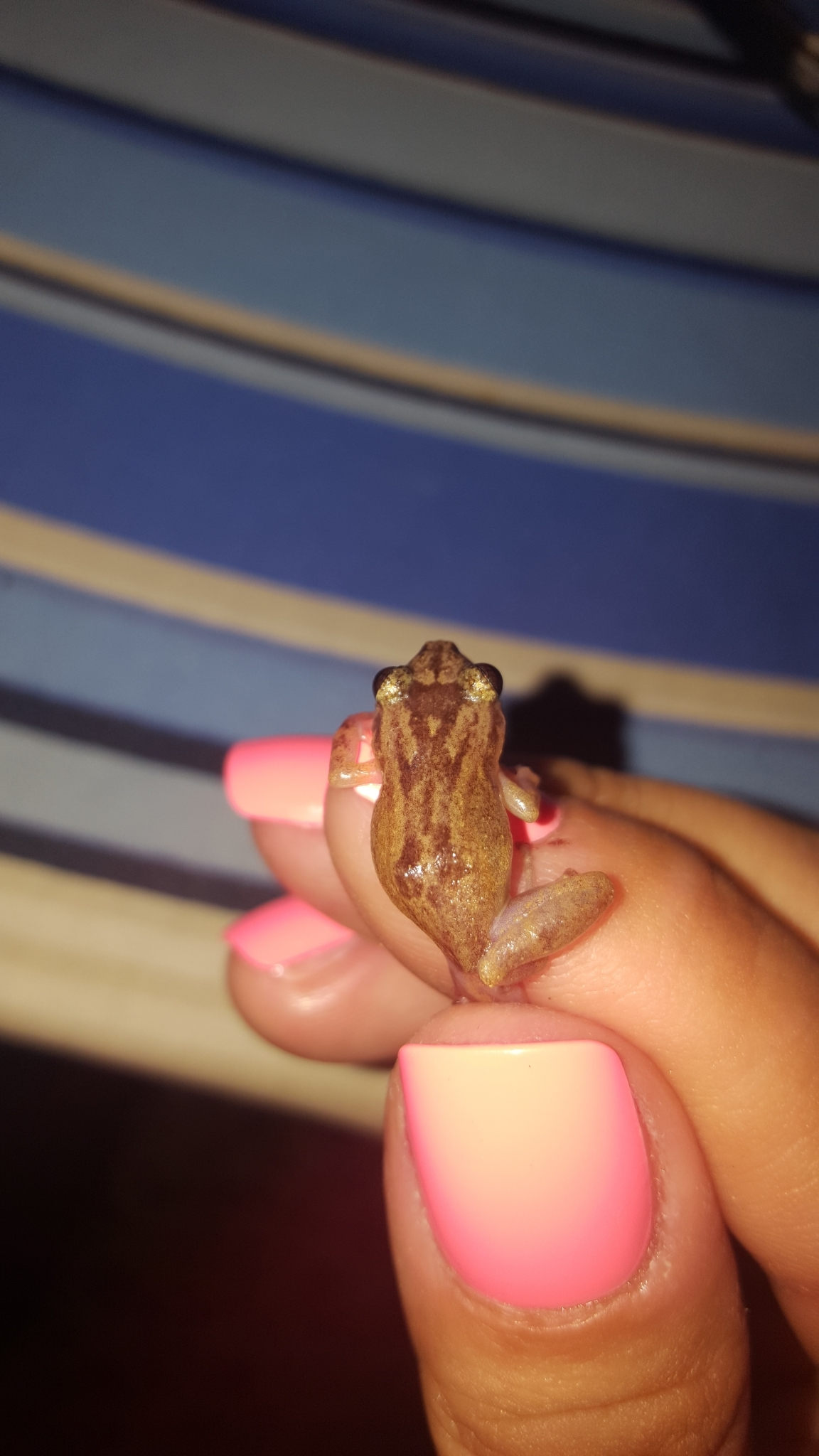

Conservation status
- Least Concern (IUCN 3.1)

Scientific classification
- Kingdom: Animalia
- Phylum: Chordata
- Class: Amphibia
- Order: Anura
- Family: Eleutherodactylidae
- Genus: Eleutherodactylus
- Subgenus: Eleutherodactylus
- Species: E. cochranae

Binomial name
- Eleutherodactylus cochranae Grant, 1932

Synonyms
- Eleutherodactylus ramosi Rivero, 1959

= Whistling coquí =

Species of amphibian

The whistling coquí, coquí pitito, Cochran's treefrog, or Cochran's robber frog (Eleutherodactylus cochranae) is a species of frog native to Puerto Rico, the US Virgin Islands, and the British Virgin Islands. This nocturnal insectivore is also referred to as the coquí pitito in Puerto Rico. Their distinctive song is a single, rising whistle, which is repeated and followed by three clicking sounds.

== Description ==
The whistling coqui measures between 0.6 and 0.7 inches, but the females can grow to 0.9 in long. Their physical coloration is gray, tan, or gray-brown. Their dorsa have a unique pattern of fine lines that resemble two reverse parenthesis {)(}. Their venters are white, gray, or creamy yellow. Their legs are brown with small toe pads, and they have dark, fine lines on the midline of their snouts. Their throats and thighs are distinctive for their speckled, small brown spots. See references for picture website.

== Distribution and habitat ==
The whistling coqui is usually found sleeping in the refuge of tree bromeliads (where it also lays its eggs) and coconut husk piles during the day. Several inhabit the southwest flank of the Luquillo Mountains and Guanica's dry forest in Puerto Rico, as well as humid areas of Puerto Rico such as Utuado, Cayey, and the Caribbean National Forest. Overall, they range from the Puerto Rican islands (except Mona and Monito) to St. John, St. Thomas, and the British Virgin Islands (except Anegada). The whistling coqui is found in semiarid, wooded areas, such as the dry forest of Guánica and the humid areas of Utuado, Cayey, and Luquillo. They find and use trees, such as bromeliad plants, and leaf litter to hide from predators during the day. Depending on their area, they are found as high as three feet from the ground in trees.

== Reproduction ==
Males use their songs as mating calls from about three feet from the ground in trees, and are usually heard before dusk and after dawn. Their reproduction, as most of the family Eleutherodactylidae, skips the tadpole phase. Their eggs are laid in humid areas, and the froglets emerge and continue their lives.
