= Sandy Point, U.S. Virgin Islands =

Coordinates: 17°41′31″N 64°52′50″W

Sandy Point, United States Virgin Islands
- Village
- Interactive map of Sandy Point, United States Virgin Islands
- Country: United States Virgin Islands
- Island: Saint Croix
- Time zone: UTC-4 (AST)

Sandy Point is a settlement on the island of Saint Croix in the United States Virgin Islands.
