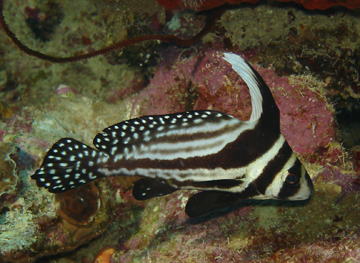
- adult
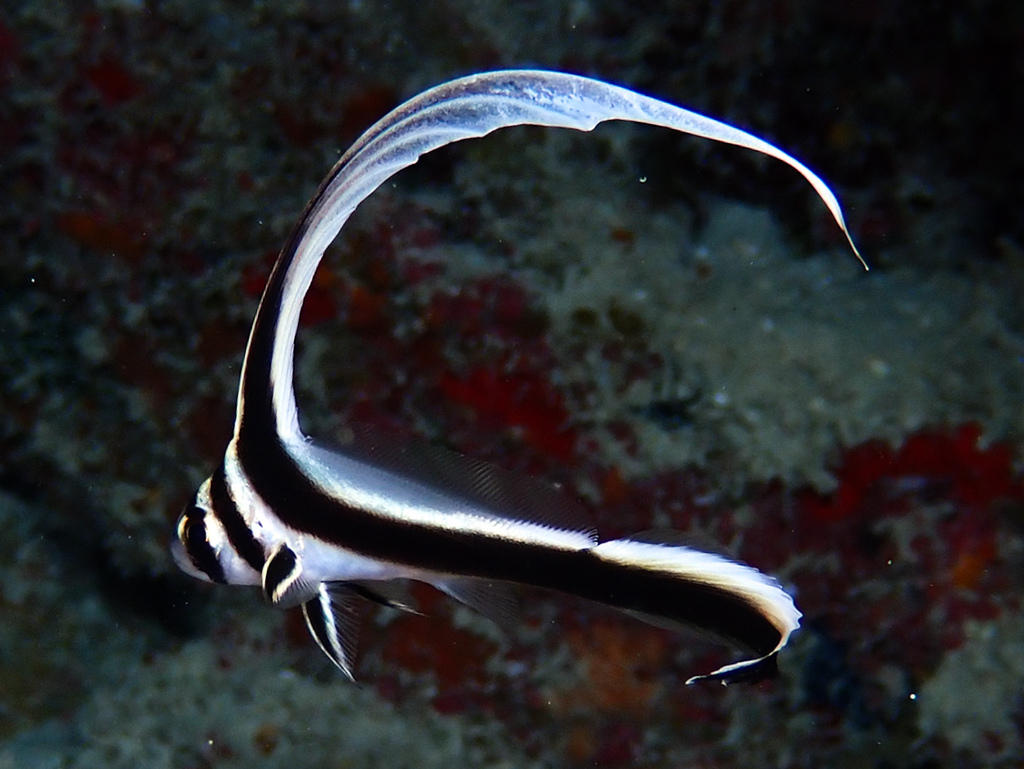
- juvenile

Conservation status
- Least Concern (IUCN 3.1)

Scientific classification
- Kingdom: Animalia
- Phylum: Chordata
- Class: Actinopterygii
- Order: Acanthuriformes
- Family: Sciaenidae
- Genus: Eques
- Species: E. punctatus

Binomial name
- Eques punctatus Bloch & Schneider, 1801

Synonyms
- Equetus punctatus (Bloch & Schneider 1801)

= Spotted drum =

Species of fish

The spotted drum or spotted ribbonfish (Eques punctatus), is a species of marine ray-finned fish belonging to the family Sciaenidae, the drums and croakers. This species is found in the western Atlantic Ocean.

== Taxonomy ==
The spotted drum was first formally described in 1801 by Marcus Elieser Bloch and Johann Gottlob Schneider with its type locality given as Cuba. The genus name, Eques was considered to be preoccupied by a name Linnaeus had used for a subgenus of Papilio, and Constantine Samuel Rafinesque created Equitus to replace Eques, however, Linnaeus's name is considered to be invalid so Eques is now considered valid. Fishbase classifies this species in the monospecific genus Equetus but other authorities include it Eques, treating Equetus as a synonym of Eques. This taxon has been placed in the subfamily Sciaeninae by some workers, but the 5th edition of Fishes of the World does not recognise subfamilies within the Sciaenidae which it places in the order Acanthuriformes.

== Description ==
The spotted drum has an oblong-shaped body, deep at the head, which tapers to a slender caudal peduncle. They have a low head with a snout which protrudes over the small, horizontal mouth. The first, spiny part of the dorsal fin is short-based and very high with between 12 and 14 spines, the second part of the dorsal fin is long-based and is supported by a single spine and between 45 and 47 soft rays. The anal fin contains 2 spines and between 8 and 8 soft rays. The body is covered in ctenoid scales and the lateral line extends to the centre of the caudal fin. The caudal, anal and soft-rayed part of the dorsal fins are dark coloured with white spotting. The head and the spiny part of the dorsal fin are marked with vertical white and dark brown bars, which curve to create longitudinal stripes along the body. The small juveniles have a white body with 3 black bars, the rearmost bar running through the dorsal fin onto the caudal fin, with an oval black spot on the snout and a black stripe on the pectoral fin. This species has a maximum published total length of 27 cm (11 in), although 18 cm (7.1 in) is more typical.

== Distribution and habitat ==
The spotted drum is found in the western Atlantic where it occurs in the Bahamas, in the Gulf of Mexico where it is found from the Florida Keys and off the coast of Mexico from Tuxpan in Veracruz and from the Yucatan to Cuba, then throughout the Caribbean Sea. Reports from Bahia, Brazil and Bermuda need to be confirmed. This species occurs at depths between 3 and 30 m (9.8 and 98.4 ft) and is associated with coral reefs.

== Biology ==
The spotted drum is frequently observed during the day under ledges or near the opening of small caves, at depths between 3 and 30 metres (98 ft), where it swims in repetitive patterns. A nocturnal feeder, it leaves the protection of its daily shelter at night to feed mainly on small crustaceans and Polychaete worms.

== Utilisation ==
The spotted drum is used in the aquarium trade.
