= Buck Island Reef National Monument =

Nature reserve in the U.S. Virgin Islands

- IUCN category Ia (strict nature reserve)
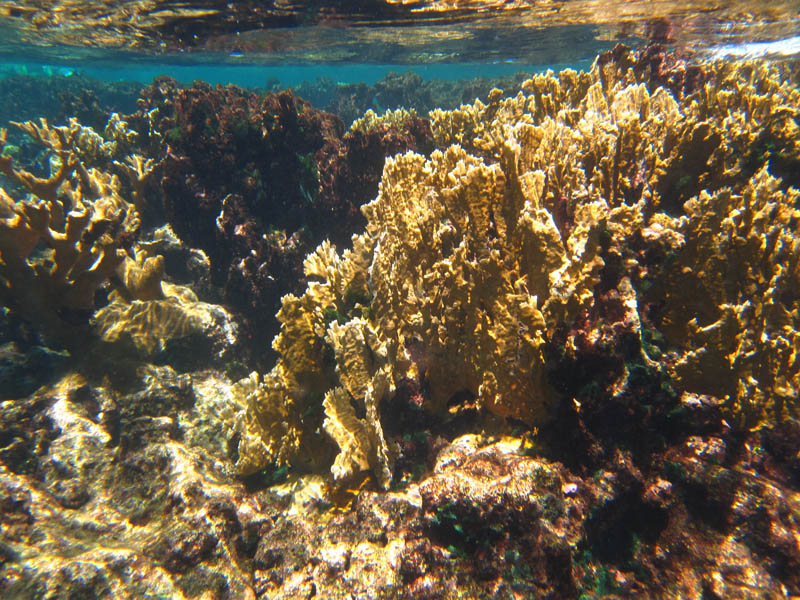

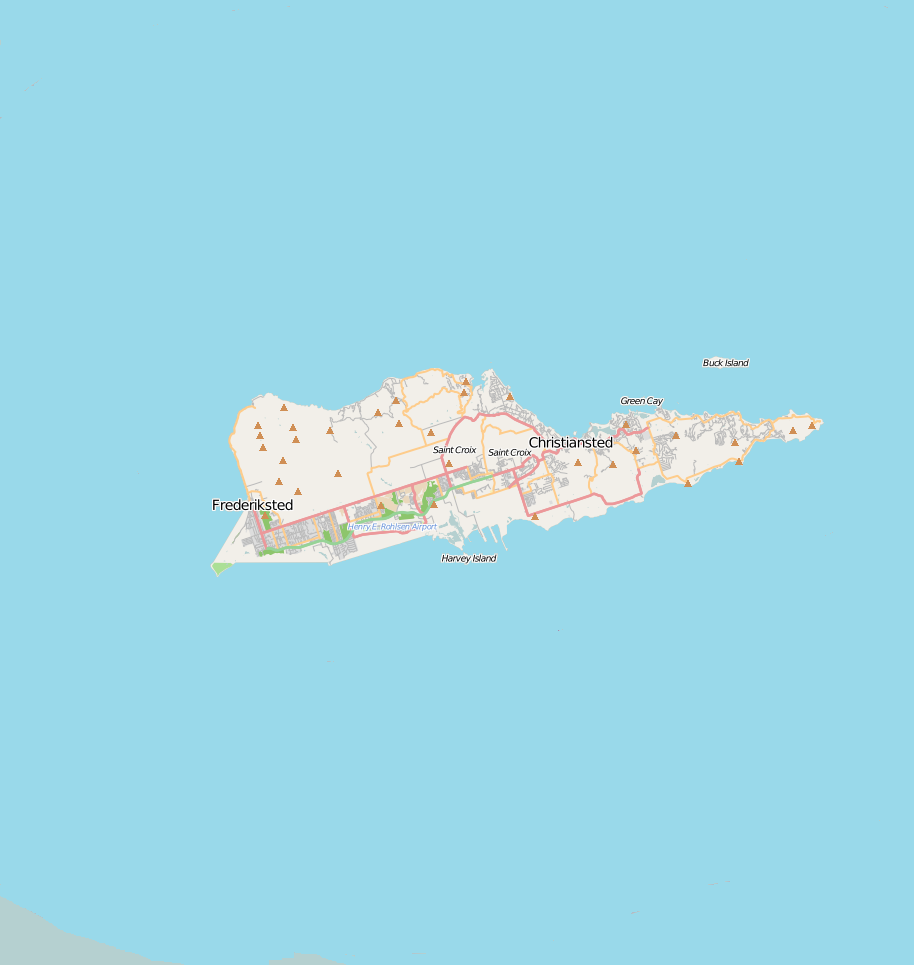
- Location within Saint Croix, US Virgin Islands Location within the U.S. Virgin Islands Location within the Caribbean
- Interactive map of Buck Island Reef National Monument
- Location: Virgin Islands, United States
- Coordinates: 17.78694°N 64.61916°W
- Area: 880 acres (360 ha)
- Established: December 28, 1961
- Visitors: 40,079 (in 2025)
- Governing body: National Park Service
- Website: Buck Island Reef National Monument

Buck Island Reef National Monument protects Buck Island, a small, uninhabited 176-acre (712,000 m²) island about 1.5 miles (2.4 km) north of the northeast coast of Saint Croix, U.S. Virgin Islands, and 18,839 acres of submerged lands, totaling 19,015 acres. It was first established as a protected area by the U.S. Government in 1948, with the intention of preserving “one of the finest marine gardens in the Caribbean Sea”. The U.S. National Monument was created in 1961 by John F. Kennedy and greatly expanded in 2001 by Bill Clinton, over the opposition of local fishermen. Buck Island National Monument is one of few places in the Virgin Islands where brown pelicans and threatened least terns nest.

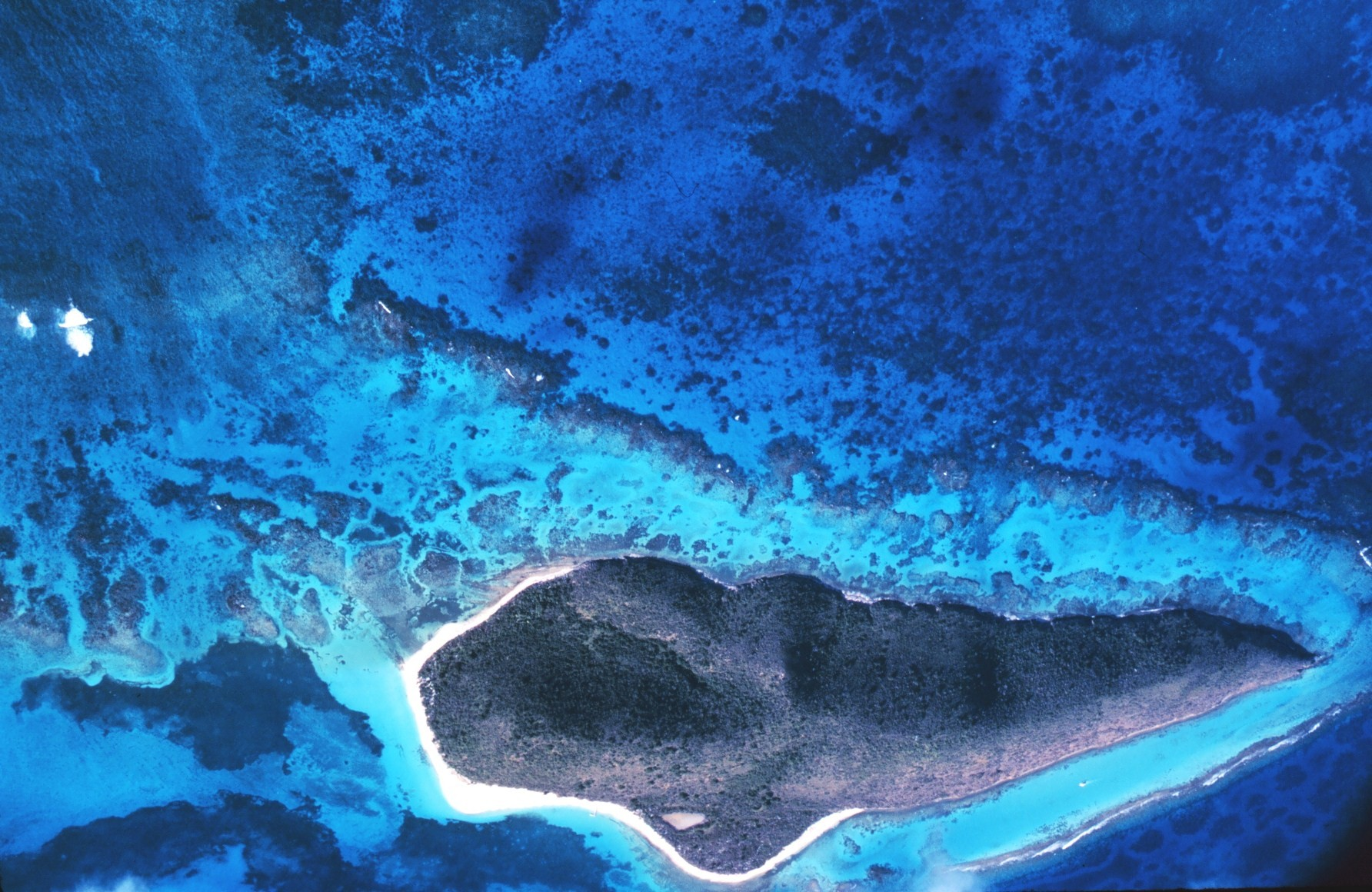
Buck Island Reef National Monument

Most of the Monument area, which is administered by the National Park Service, is underwater and attracts around 50,000 visitors a year. With its 4,554-acre (18.43 km^{2}) reef there is plenty to explore and experience in the water. Snorkelers can follow a marked underwater trail on the eastern tip. It is one of only three underwater trails in the United States. Along the trail are plaques denoting information about marine flora and fauna commonly found in the area. Two thirds of the island is surrounded by an elkhorn coral barrier reef, providing an ecosystem for over 250 fish species and a variety of other marine life including spotted eagle rays, nurse sharks and lemon sharks, and juvenile Blacktip reef sharks and Whitetip reef sharks. In the spring endangered Leatherback turtles come onto the beach to nest while Green turtles and Hawksbill turtles nest during the summer months. Turtle Beach on the western edge of the island features a pristine white sand beach and has been voted one of the world's most beautiful beaches by National Geographic.

The National Park Service has been monitoring Buck Island for over 40 years. Most of the research is focused on coral, fish, sea turtles, brown pelicans and least tern nesting. West beach is one of the most active turtle nesting beaches in the world with one of the longest continually operating research programs.

To ensure the ecosystem continues to thrive, the National Park Service requires all visitors to use authorized concessioners providing guided tours or have a permit if on private vessels without paying customers. To help protect the natural environment, visitors are encouraged to wear non-toxic reef safe sunscreen or a rash guard while swimming in the waters surrounding Buck Island Reef National Monument.

== Gallery ==
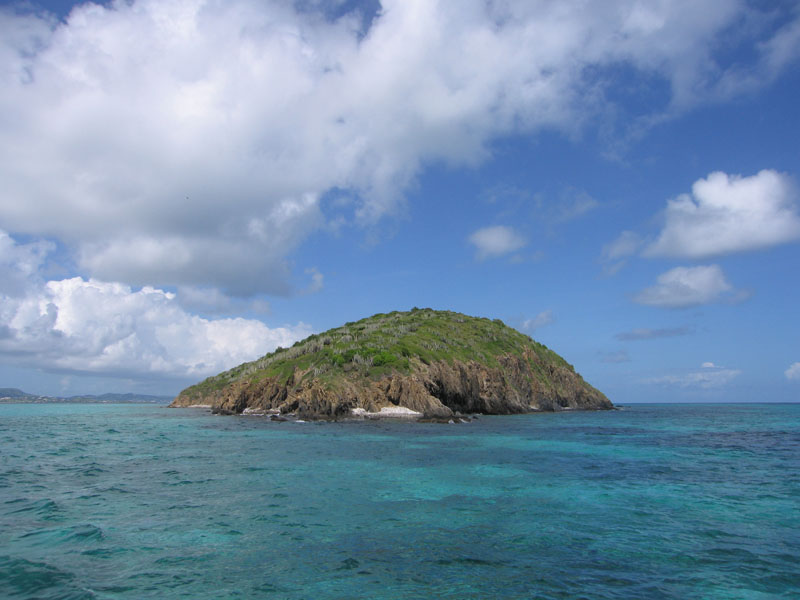
Buck Island seen from the East

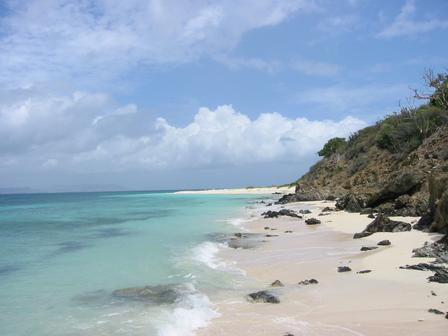

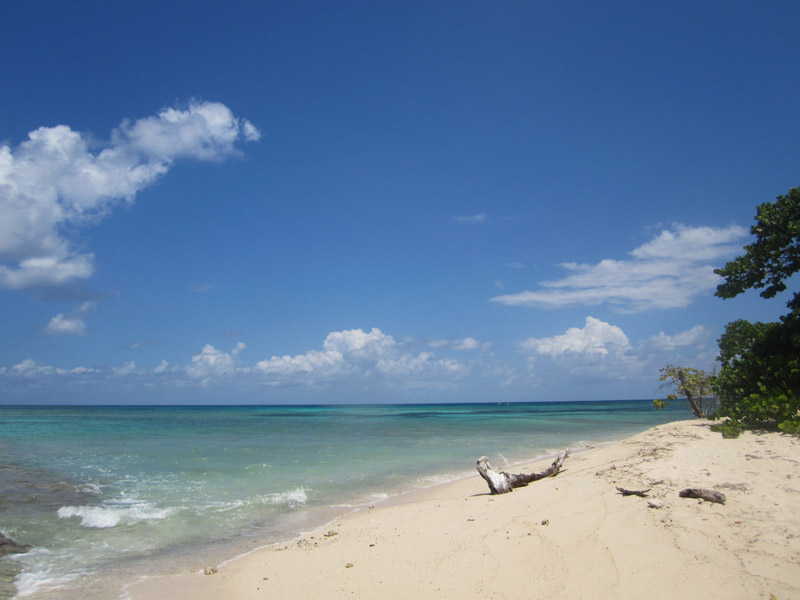
Turtle Beach at the western tip of the island

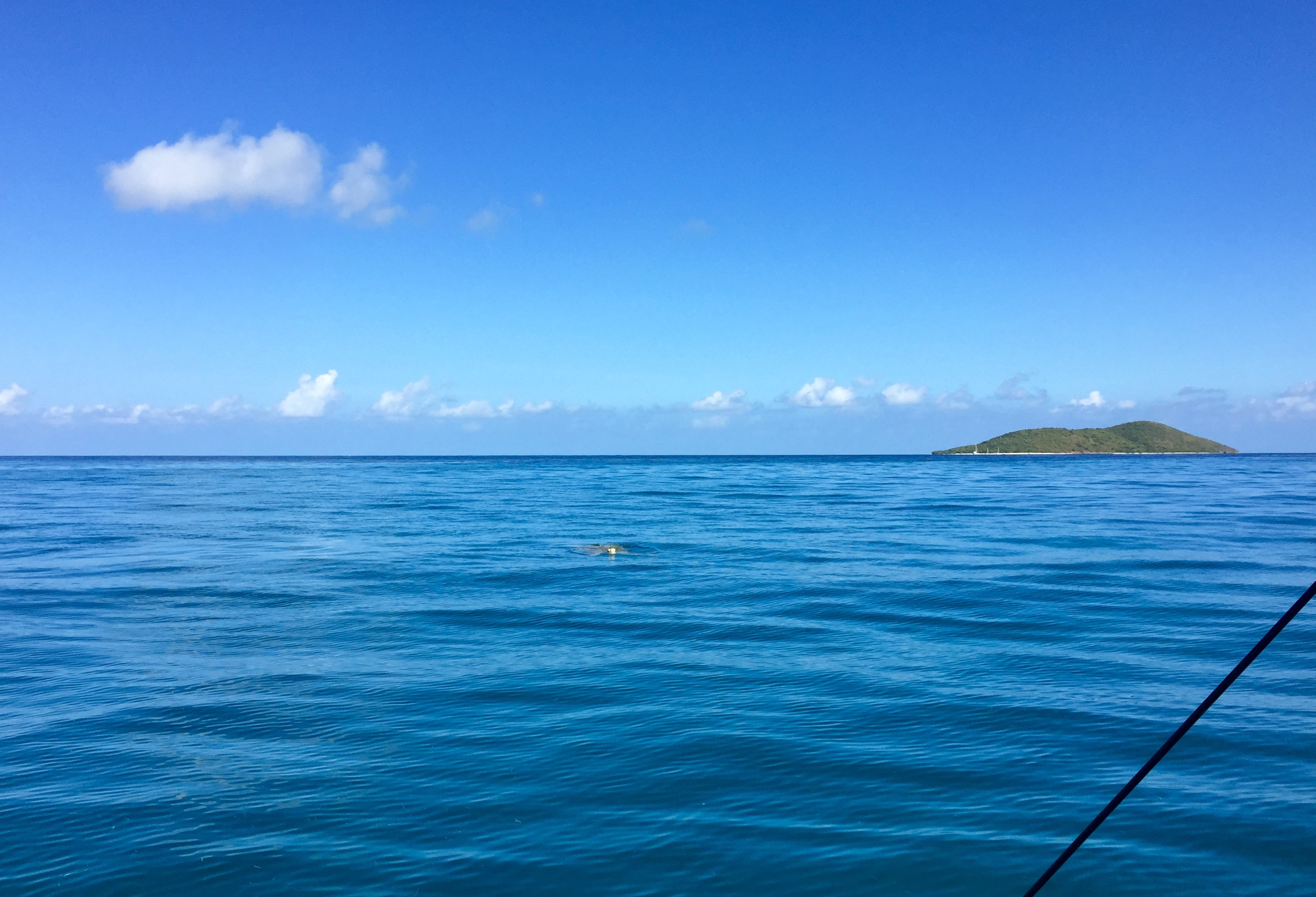
Buck Island and Sea Turtle

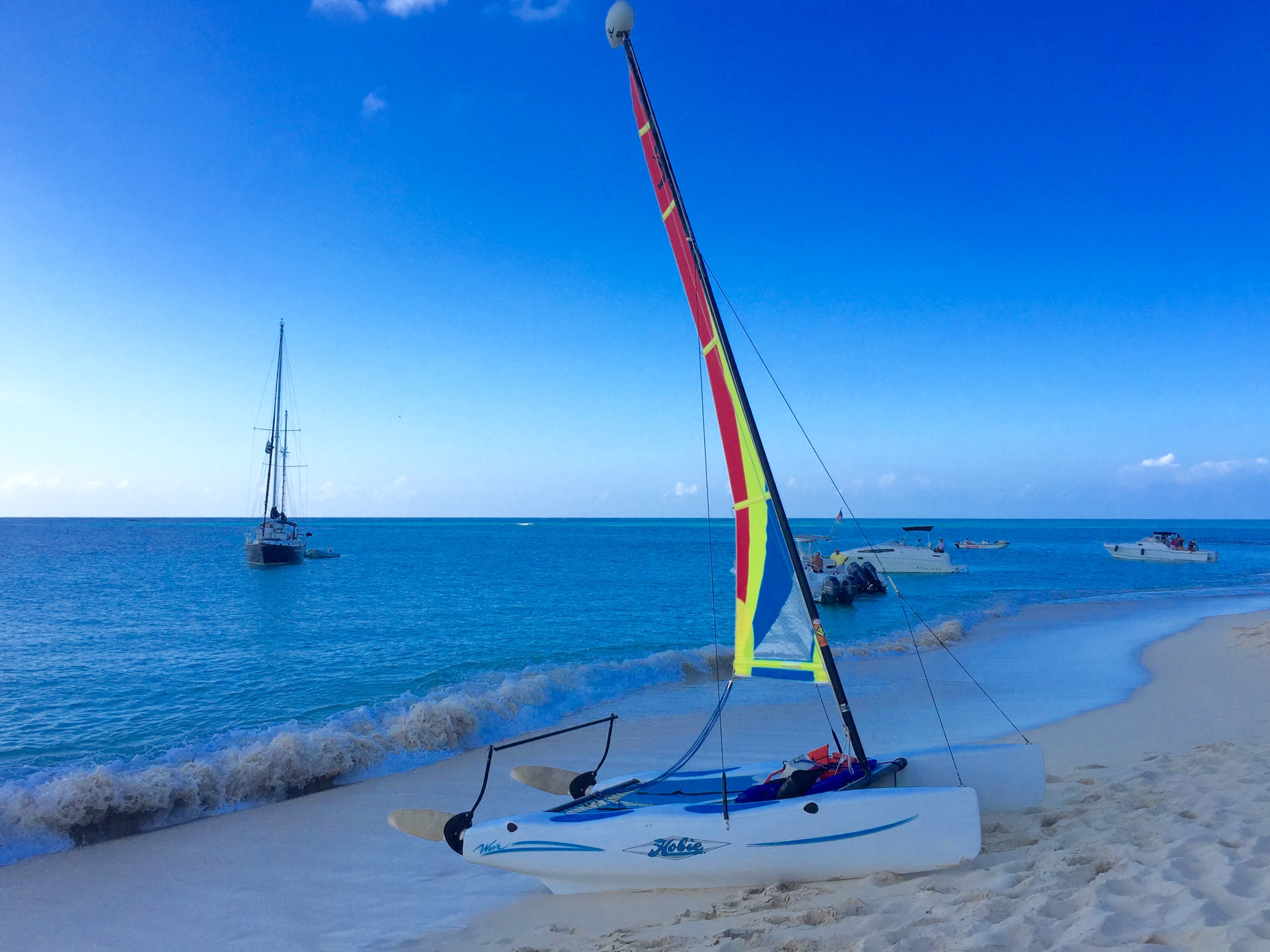
Hobie Cat on Buck Island

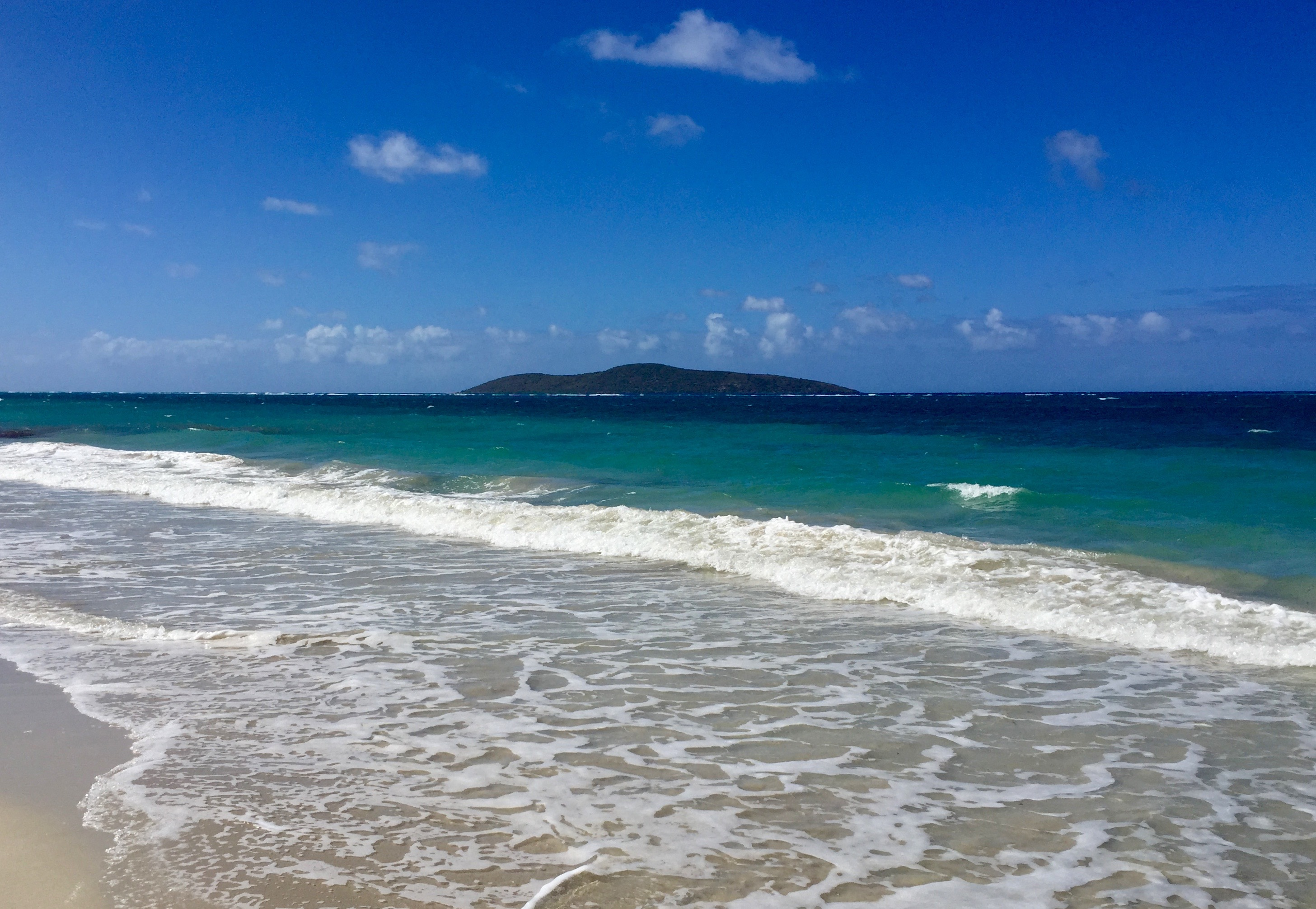
Buck Island from East End

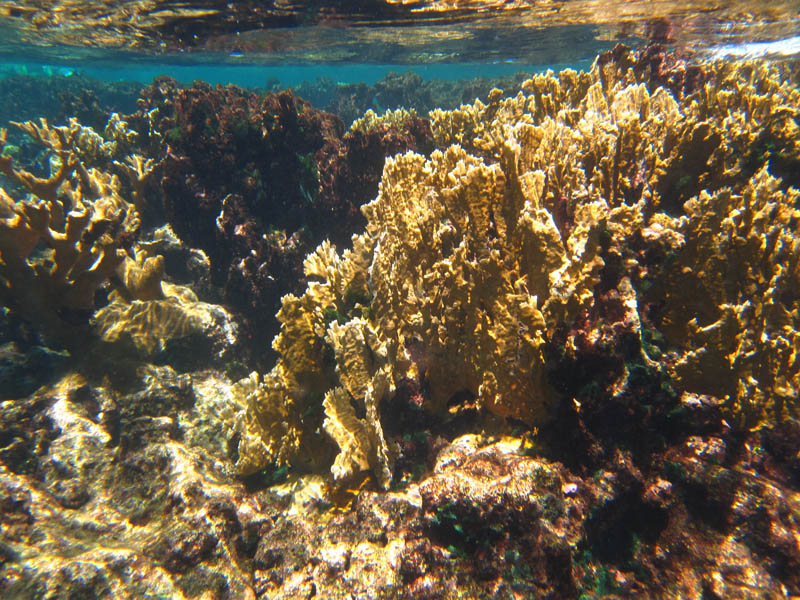

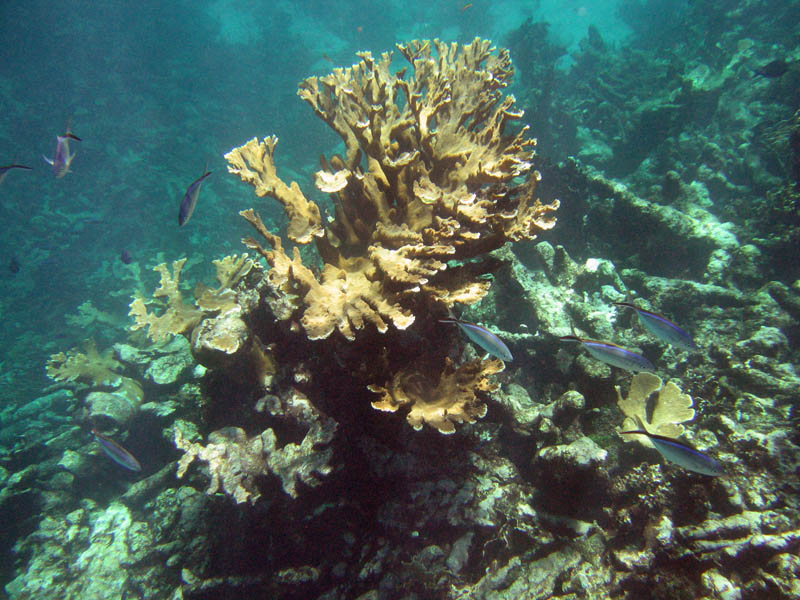

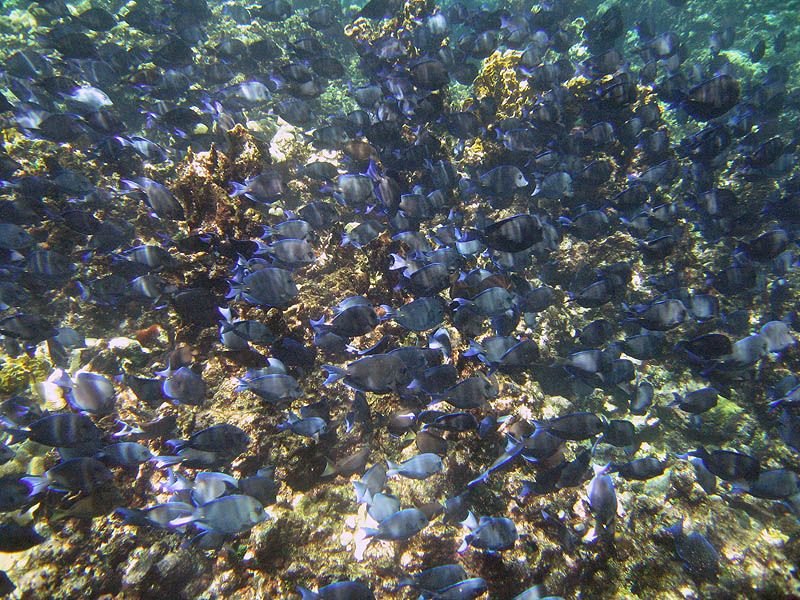
Shoal of blue tangs

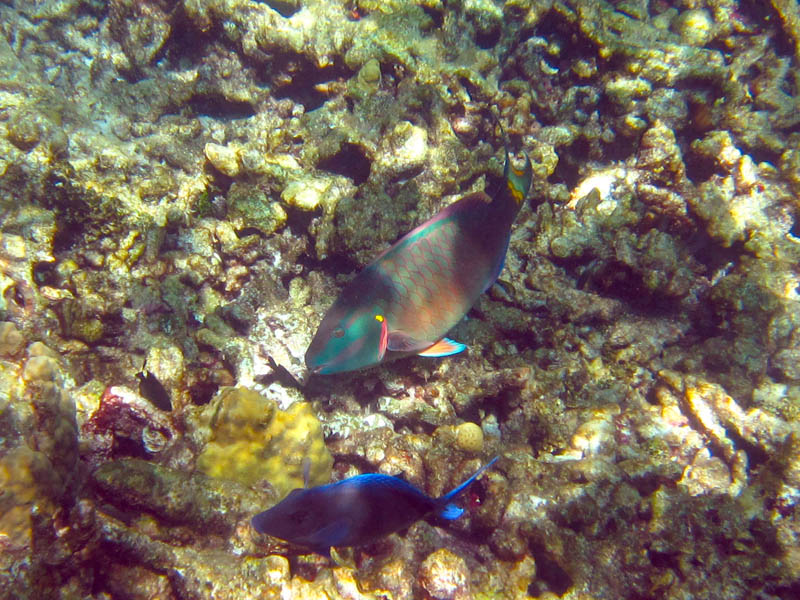
Stoplight parrotfish

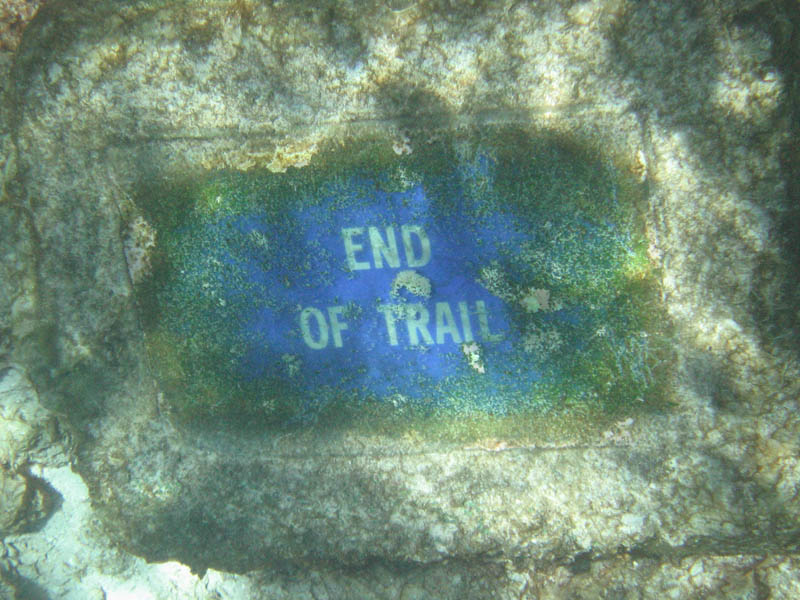
End of the underwater marked trail

== See also ==
- List of national monuments of the United States
