= Coral reef of Varadero =

Coral reef in the Bay of Cartagena, Colombia

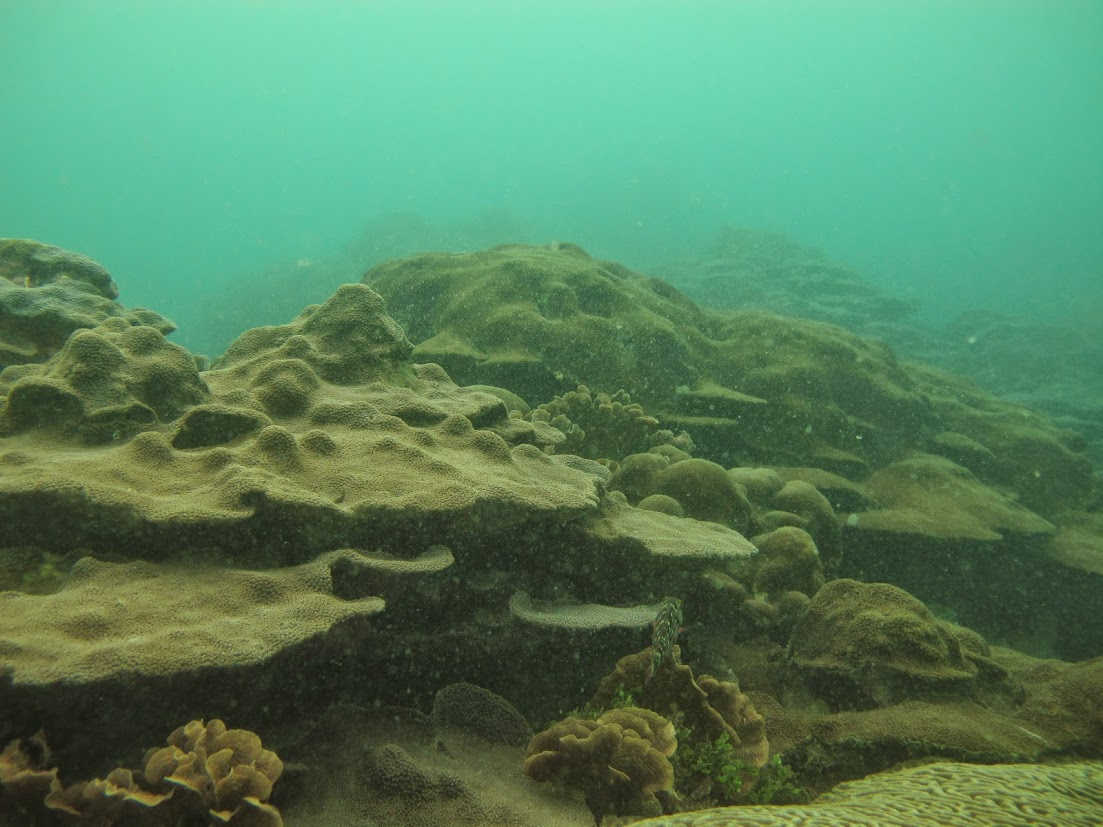
Taken by a member of the Mónica Medina Lab at Penn State during a field expedition. Large colonies of coral reside in the coral reef of Varadero despite turbid water conditions.

Coral Reef of Varadero is a coral reef located in the Bay of Cartagena, Colombia. Its paradoxical existence, harboring high coral cover and diversity despite the poor water quality and high sediment loads discharged into the Bay for the last 500 years by the Canal del Dique, has drawn special interest by the scientific community as well as local and international media. The persistence of Varadero reef is currently threatened by a project to modernize Cartagena's port, which includes the dredging of a new shipping lane through the reef. The regular operation and maintenance of the channel is also likely to cause water quality in the Bay to deteriorate.

== Location ==
Varadero Reef (10⁰18'10"N, 75⁰34'55"W) is a 1 km^{2} shallow water reef located SW of the Bay of Cartagena. It lies in the northern limit of the Natural Park Corales del Rosario y San Bernardo, Colombian Caribbean. It is located approximately 6 kilometers to the east of the main mouth of the Canal del Dique, a canal of 118 kilometers connecting the Cartagena Bay to the Magdalena River. The annual water discharge and sediment load of the Canal del Dique has a mean of almost 400 m^{3} per second and 6 million tons per year, respectively, and as a result the Bay closely resembles an estuarine environment. The influx of human activity accompanied by the presence of this canal has increased the Bay water's turbidity, nutrient levels, and sedimentation during last decades, which in turn may have caused acute damage to the coral reefs and seagrass beds in the area. Reefs outside the Bay, including those of the Rosario Islands, have also been negatively impacted by the increased sedimentation rates from the Magdalena River and the construction of new channels from El Dique to the south of the Bay of Cartagena.

== Ecological significance ==
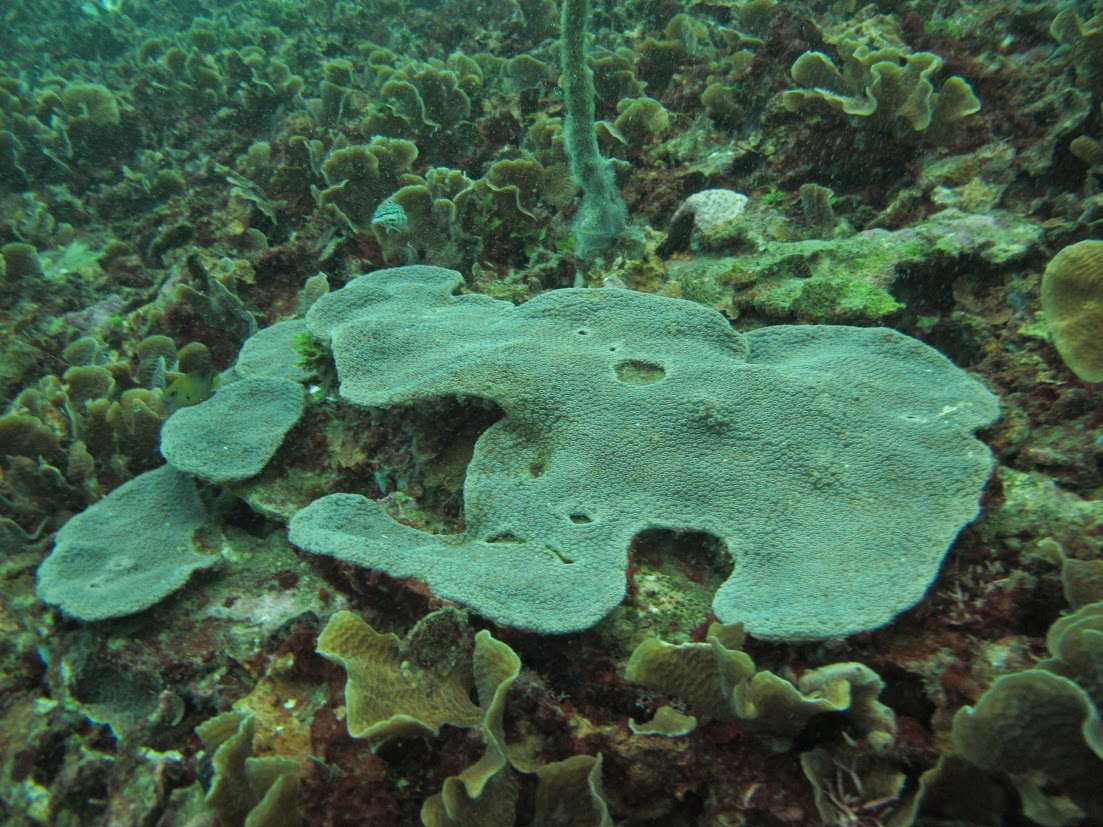
An Orbicella colony grows in a plate-like morphology to optimize sunlight for its photosynthetic endosymbiont in the coral reef of Varadero.

Roughly 1 km^{2} in size, Varadero boasts approximately 80% coral cover. Reaching more than 3 meters in diameter, many of the massive colonies found in the reef of Varadero belong to the hermatypic coral genus Orbicella. This reef is estimated to contain over 30 scleractinian coral species. To adjust to the low light levels resulting from the high turbidity, some corals have utilized a flattened, plate-like growth strategy to optimize light exposure for its photosynthetic algal endosymbionts of the genus Symbiodinium. With the rapid decline of coral reefs in the Caribbean, scientists are examining reefs such as Varader that are surviving in conditions previously thought to be inhospitable to corals to understand reef resilience. Furthermore, microbiome and physiological research of this reef indicate that Varadero is experiencing a slow decline and may be on the brink of dysbiosis.

== First scientific studies ==
On December 14, 2017, a group of Colombian and American scientists published a paper titled "Unraveling the structure and composition of Varadero Reef, an improbable and imperiled coral reef in the Colombian Caribbean." This paper provided early insight into the existence of this paradoxical marine ecosystem. This work was released by scientists Valeria Pizarro (Fundación Ecomares), Sara Rodríguez (Pontificia Universidad Javeriana, Colombia), Mateo López-Victoria (Pontificia Universidad Javeriana, Colombia), Fernando Zapata (Universidad del Valle, Colombia), Sven Zea (CECIMAR - Universidad Nacional de Colombia), Claudia Galindo, Roberto Iglesias, Mónica Medina and Joseph Pollock (Pennsylvania State University).

One year later on June 22nd 2018 the Instituto de Investigaciones Marinas y Costeras "José Benito de Andreis" Invemar released a paper titled "Identificación, cuantificación y delimitación de hábitats bentónicos de ecosistemas marinos estratégicos en el sector Bahía de Cartagena (Varadero)". One of the aims of this paper was to create the opportunity for Varadero reef to be legally conserved.

== Hope Spot designation ==
Since last April 23rd 2018, Varadero Reef has been designated as a Hope Spot by the NGO Mission Blue. The Hope Spot designation is often given to areas that require protection, but they can also be existing Marine Protected Areas where more action is needed. These areas all provide hope for a variety of reasons:

- A special abundance or diversity of species, unusual or representative species, habitats or ecosystems.
- Particular populations of rare, threatened or endemic species.
- A site with potential to reverse damage from negative human impacts.
- The presence of natural processes such as major migration corridors or spawning grounds.
- Significant historical, cultural or spiritual values.
- Particular economic importance to the community.

== Salvemos Varadero ==
Salvemos Varadero is a citizen initiative created in 2016 in the city of Cartagena de Indias, Colombia. Its purpose is to defend, in legal and conservation terms, the only coral reef surviving from the polluted waters of the Bay of Cartagena: the Coral Reef of Varadero. This includes its national declaration by the Ministry of Environment and Sustainable Development and the President of the Republic of Colombia as a new protected area for the people of Cartagena, Colombia and mankind. Today, Salvemos Varadero is supported by more than 64,000 citizens across the world who demand its legal protection. Asides from its active presence across social media platforms, the Salvemos Varadero initiative also has its own official song.

Varadero and the fishing community that derives its livelihood from this reef were showcased in the documentary Saving Atlantis. The directors of the film documented the experience of showing the film to the community in their blog Traveling Cinema.
