= 1992 Central American and Caribbean Junior Championships in Athletics =

X Central American and Caribbean Junior Championships
- Dates: 10–12 July
- Host city: Tegucigalpa, Honduras
- Level: Junior and Youth
- Events: 79 (41 junior, 38 youth)
- Participation: about 304 (167 junior, 137 youth) athletes from 17 nations

The 10th Central American and Caribbean Junior Championships was held in Tegucigalpa, Honduras, between 10–12 July 1992.

== Medal summary ==
Medal winners are published by category: Junior A, Male, Junior A, Female, and Junior B. Complete results can be found on the World Junior Athletics History website.

=== Male Junior A (under 20) ===
Event	Gold		Silver		Bronze	
100 metres (0.0 m/s)	Ato Boldon (TRI)	10.4	Kareem Streete-Thompson (CAY)	10.6	Alejandro Cárdenas (MEX)	10.6
200 metres (0.1 m/s)	Ato Boldon (TRI)	21.5	Rosendo Rivera (PUR)	22.2	Wendell Faria (SUR)	22.3
400 metres	Gustavo del Castillo (PAN)	48.8	Arturo Castillón (MEX)	48.9	Erick Torres (PUR)	49.3
800 metres	Jorge Islas (MEX)	1:54.7	Jorge Rojas (CRC)	1:54.9	Mario Rivera (PUR)	1:55.1
1500 metres	Ignacio Jiménez (MEX)	4:00.0	Alberto Jaén (PAN)	4:01.2	Jorge Ulate (CRC)	4:03.5
5000 metres	Fernando García (MEX)	15:21.3	Juan Perea (MEX)	15:22.3	Carlos Guerra (PAN)	15:43.9
10,000 metres	Marcos Villa (MEX)	32:10.8	Carlos Guerra (PAN)	32:11.0	Alejandro Espinoza (CRC)	33:03.5
Half Marathon	Jhonny Loría (CRC)	1:15:09	Alejandro Espinoza (CRC)	1:17:56	Gerardo García (MEX)	1:18:47
3000 metres steeplechase	Ignacio Jiménez (MEX)	9:19.2	Mauro Pérez (MEX)	9:51.6	Ronald Arias (ESA)	10:00.3
110 metres hurdles (1.9 m/s)	César Jongitud (MEX)	14.9	Shawn Browne (BAR)	15.3	Alberto Aguirre (MEX)	15.7
400 metres hurdles	Arturo Castillón (MEX)	52.5	Shawn Browne (BAR)	52.8	Francisco Álvarez (PUR)	53.3
High jump	Victor Houston (BAR)	2.08	José Barahona (PAN)	2.00	Edgar Andrade (MEX)	1.92
Pole vault	Edgar León (MEX)	4.80	Jorge Tienda (MEX)	4.15	Cecil Koehling (HON)	3.05
Long jump	Kareem Streete-Thompson (CAY)	7.57	Keita Cline (IVB)	7.38	Victor Houston (BAR)	7.06
Triple jump	Ricardo Santiago (PUR)	15.40	Victor Houston (BAR)	15.20	Keita Cline (IVB)	14.64
Shot put	Alejandro Benítez (PUR)	14.94	Daniel Ríos (MEX)	13.87	Alberto Cisniega (MEX)	13.04
Discus throw	Alejandro Benítez (PUR)	41.60	Héctor González (PUR)	38.98	Walter Hernández (ESA)	37.54
Hammer throw	Héctor González (PUR)	47.48	Ernesto Argumedo (ESA)	44.60	Ramón Arce (MEX)	42.14
Javelin throw	Juan Manuel López (MEX)	64.07	Alberto Cisniega (MEX)	62.23	Osvaldo Márquez (GUA)	45.37
Decathlon	Kevin Stephens (TRI)	5637	Gersón Sánchez (MEX)	5238	Carlos Martínez (MEX)	5068
10,000 metres Track Walk	Alejandro López (MEX)	44:51.1	Rogelio Sánchez (MEX)	46:34.9	Hugo López (GUA)	47:15.4
4 × 100 metres relay	Puerto Rico; Erick Torres; Miguel Ortega; Rosendo Rivera; Dan Ditzler	41.2	Mexico; Carlos Villaseñor; Esteban Fuentes; Gersón Sánchez; Manuel López	42.0	Honduras; Juan Daniel Lobo; Cecil Koehling; Carlos Lino; Alex Flores	44.4
4 × 400 metres relay	Puerto Rico; Erick Torres; Rosendo Rivera; Carlos Sánchez; Francisco Álvarez	3:15.5	Mexico; Felix; Montes; Alberto Aguirre; Arturo Castillón	3:19.4	Costa Rica; Jorge Rojas; Egbert Stevens; Jorge Ulate; Brenes	3:26.3

=== Female Junior A (under 20) ===
Event	Gold		Silver		Bronze	
100 metres (0.0 m/s)	Dedra Davis (BAH)	12.0	Savatheda Fynes (BAH)	12.1	Shelley Ann Wicker (TRI)	12.2
200 metres (-0.1 m/s)	Savatheda Fynes (BAH)	24.1	Jessica de la Cruz (PUR)	24.6	Shelley Ann Wicker (TRI)	24.9
400 metres	Jessica de la Cruz (PUR)	55.8	Tracy Bradshaw (IVB)	57.6	Claudia Moctezuma (MEX)	57.8
800 metres	Elizabeth Betancourt (MEX)	2:15.0	Lilia Pichardo (MEX)	2:16.0	Sandra Moya (PUR)	2:18.1
1500 metres	María Elena Jasso (MEX)	4:42.6	Catherine Diéguez (GUA)	5:24.0	Sandra Espinal (HON)	5:40.4
3000 metres	María Luz Villanueva (MEX)	10:40.0	Ana María Carrillo (MEX)	10:43.3	Sasha Durán (PUR)	11:35.6
100 metres hurdles (-1.9 m/s)	Susana Quevedo (MEX)	14.7	Marlene Vargas (MEX)	15.9	Nora Alemán (HON)	18.9
400 metres hurdles	Arniece McPhee (BAH)	62.0	Mayra González (MEX)	63.6	Carmen Carballo (PUR)	65.8
High jump	Valdéz Chacón (MEX)	1.68	Sandra Oliveros (GUA)	1.40		
Long jump	Dedra Davis (BAH)	6.00	María de Jesús (MEX)	5.14	Griselda de la Cruz (MEX)	5.13
Triple jump	Martha Lewis (CRC)	10.59	Arniece McPhee (BAH)	10.27	Reyna Osorio (HON)	7.69
Shot put	Angélica Roux (MEX)	11.95	América Chririnos (MEX)	11.12	Eva María Dimas (ESA)	10.08
Discus throw	Elizabeth Sánchez (MEX)	41.58	Eva María Dimas (ESA)	35.44	Jessica Gómez (HON)	30.14
Javelin throw	Marsha Mark (TRI)	42.43	María Haydé (MEX)	39.81	Aracely López (MEX)	38.72
Heptathlon	Carmen Carballo (PUR)	3548	Dana Vega (MEX)	3066	Azucenza Aguilera (HON)	2251
5000 metres Track Walk	Rosario Sánchez (MEX)	27:26.0	María Ambrosio (GUA)	27:48.5	Meivis Castillo (PAN)	33:32.4
4 × 100 metres relay	Puerto Rico; Alba Báez; Jessica de la Cruz; Wanda Betancourt; Elaine Torres	47.8	Mexico; Marlene Vargas; Susana Quevedo; Padron; Mayra González	50.0	Guatemala; Catherine Diéguez; Patricia Valenzuela; Amrei Baumgarten; Sandra Oliveros	52.8
4 × 400 metres relay	Mexico; Claudia Moctezuma; Mayra González; Griselda de la Cruz; Elizabeth Betancourt	3:55.4	Puerto Rico; Wanda Betancourt; Elaine Torres; Sandra Moya; Jessica de la Cruz	3:56.0	Guatemala; Patricia Valenzuela; Catherine Diéguez; Amrei Baumgarten; Sandra Oliveros	4:24.0

=== Male Junior B (under 17) ===
Event	Gold		Silver		Bronze	
100 metres (0.0 m/s)	Jason Hamilton (CAY)	11.2	Roberto Santiago (PUR)	11.4	Vianny Coffie (AHO)	11.5
200 metres (0.0 m/s)	Thyrold Smith (TCA)	22.5	Egbert Stevens (CRC)	22.6	Alex Isaac (PUR)	22.9
400 metres	Shariff Taylor (BER)	49.6	Garth Chadband (TRI)	49.7	Thyrold Smith (TCA)	50.5
800 metres	Shariff Taylor (BER)	2:00.3	Garth Chadband (TRI)	2:01.3	Manuel Velázquez (PUR)	2:01.6
1500 metres	Héctor García (MEX)	4:06.4	Manuel Velázquez (PUR)	4:09.3	Julio Guevara (MEX)	4:12.5
3000 metres	David Galindo (MEX)	9:22.5	Joel Rosario (PUR)	9:42.2	Denis Maradiaga (HON)	10:06.2
2000 metres steeplechase	Héctor García (MEX)	6:17.0	José Martínez (PUR)	6:55.6	Antonio Bustillo (HON)	7:49.0
110 metres hurdles (-0.1 m/s)	Carmelo Rondón (PUR)	15.1	José Carmona (PUR)	15.4	Marco García (MEX)	15.9
400 metres hurdles	Marco García (MEX)	54.7	Omar Olguín (MEX)	56.8	Carmelo Rondón (PUR)	60.0
High jump	Luis Soto (PUR)	2.08	Stephen Woodley (BER)	2.06	Jorge Reyes (PUR)	1.98
Pole vault	Maximiliano Wong (MEX)	3.65				
Long jump	Luis Soto (PUR)	6.95	Stephen Woodley (BER)	6.70	Antonio Avena (MEX)	6.52
Triple jump	Severo Barrientos (GUA)	13.61	Marco García (MEX)	13.40	Rohan Simons (BER)	13.37
Shot put	Hosea Hilton (BAH)	15.20	Christopher Merced (PUR)	15.19	Anthony Alexander (TRI)	14.14
Discus throw	Christopher Merced (PUR)	47.28	Anthony Alexander (TRI)	46.90	Dominic Powell (CAY)	40.12
Hammer throw	Eduardo Hernández (PUR)	45.46	Oscar Villalobos (MEX)	45.16	Mauricio Gutiérrez (MEX)	28.68
Javelin throw	Daniel Espinosa (MEX)	51.95	Anthony Alexander (TRI)	51.93	Dominic Powell (CAY)	51.71
Heptathlon	Juan Ramírez (MEX)	4225	Gerardo Morales (MEX)	3618	Alamar Barrientos (GUA)	3354
5000 metres Track Walk	Benjamín Peña (MEX)	24:13.5	Esteban Santos (MEX)	24:38.7	Miguel Banegas (HON)	26:52.2
4 × 100 metres relay	Puerto Rico; Alex Dávila; Cintrón; Roberto Santiago; Alex Isaac	43.4	Mexico; Luis Martínez; Evener Dueñas; Hugo Farias; Antonio Avena	43.8	Guatemala; Salomon Rowe; Contreras; José Vladimiro Rivera; Gandara	46.7
4 × 400 metres relay	Mexico; Juan Arrieta; Omar Olguín; Evener Dueñas; Marco García	3:25.4	Puerto Rico; Juan Camacho; Cintrón; Efrain Arzola; Manuel Velázquez	3:25.6	Guatemala; Alamar Barrientos; Contreras; Sigfrido Rivera; Severo Barrientos	3:43.4

=== Female Junior B (under 17) ===
Event	Gold		Silver		Bronze	
100 metres (0.0 m/s)	Debbie Ferguson (BAH)	12.0	Alicia Tyson (TRI)	12.1	Mayra Osorio (PUR)	12.2
200 metres (-0.1 m/s)	Debbie Ferguson (BAH)	24.2	Alicia Tyson (TRI)	24.8	Militza Castro (PUR)	25.2
400 metres	Militza Castro (PUR)	56.6	Stephany Grant (CRC)	57.6	Mónica Medina (MEX)	57.7
800 metres	Mónica Medina (MEX)	2:14.3	Karla Betancourt (MEX)	2:15.0	Svamy Pabón (PUR)	2:18.2
1200 metres	Mónica Martell (MEX)	3:33.5	Karla Betancourt (MEX)	3:37.6	Svamy Pabón (PUR)	3:53.5
100 metres hurdles (-2.5 m/s)	Verónica Bollo (MEX)	15.0	Sheila Acosta (PUR)	15.2	Marisela Castillo (MEX)	15.6
300 metres hurdles	Verónica Bollo (MEX)	45.0	Stephany Grant (CRC)	45.9	Marisela Castillo (MEX)	46.8
High jump	Claudia Pinedo (MEX)	1.70	Jéssica Castañeda (MEX)	1.55	Loira Acosta (PUR)	1.45
Long jump	Loira Acosta (PUR)	5.25	Sandra Friedrich (MEX)	5.23	Elluany Reid (CRC)	5.10
Triple jump	María Fleischmann (GUA)	10.93	Itnuyt Janovitz (MEX)	10.46	Elluany Reid (CRC)	10.42
Shot put	Adriana Salas (MEX)	10.16	Flor Acosta (MEX)	9.86	Natalie Paul (TRI)	9.49
Discus throw	Norma Tilapa (MEX)	32.80	Natalie Paul (TRI)	30.34	Silvia Hofens (GUA)	27.72
Javelin throw	Adriana Salas (MEX)	37.98	Cleopatra Francis (TRI)	33.79	Madeline Moreno (PUR)	32.76
Pentathlon	Sheila Acosta (PUR)	2161	Silvia Martínez (MEX)	1676		
4000 metres Track Walk	Maribel Rebollo (MEX)	21:09.6	Radhamani Mariu (CRC)	26:01.6	Cindy Randales (HON)	26:37.5
4 × 100 metres relay	Puerto Rico; Mayra Osorio; Militza Castro; Colón; Xiomara Dávila	46.7	Mexico; Verónica Bollo; Nidia Verduzco; Sheila Zapata; Elena González	48.4	Costa Rica; Stephanie Grant; Ericka Cyrus; Geoling Fernández; Edmond	49.6
4 × 400 metres relay	Mexico; Verónica Bollo; Mónica Medina; Sheila Zapata; Elena González	3:52.9	Puerto Rico	3:57.8	Honduras	4:36.8

== Medal table (unofficial) ==
* Host nation (Honduras)

Rank	Nation	Gold	Silver	Bronze	Total
1	Mexico (MEX)	38	33	17	88
2	Puerto Rico (PUR)	19	13	16	48
3	Bahamas (BAH)	7	2	0	9
4	Trinidad and Tobago (TTO)	4	8	4	16
5	Costa Rica (CRC)	2	6	6	14
6	Guatemala (GUA)	2	3	8	13
7	Bermuda (BER)	2	2	1	5
8	Cayman Islands (CAY)	2	1	2	5
9	Panama (PAN)	1	3	2	6
10	Barbados (BAR)	1	3	1	5
11	Turks and Caicos Islands (TKS)	1	0	1	2
12	El Salvador (ESA)	0	2	3	5
13	British Virgin Islands (IVB)	0	2	1	3
14	Honduras (HON)*	0	0	12	12
15	Netherlands Antilles (AHO)	0	0	1	1
15	Suriname (SUR)	0	0	1	1
Totals (16 entries)		79	78	76	233

== Participation (unofficial) ==
Host country Honduras and the Turks and Caicos Islands competed for the first time at the championships. Detailed result lists can be found on the World Junior Athletics History website. An unofficial count yields a number of about 304 athletes (167 junior (under-20) and 137 youth (under-17)) from about 17 countries:

- Bahamas (5)
- Barbados (2)
- Bermuda (5)
- British Virgin Islands (2)
- Cayman Islands (3)
- Costa Rica (19)
- El Salvador (12)
- Guatemala (40)
- Honduras (56)
- (Mexico) México (95)
- Netherlands Antilles (3)
- (Panama) Panamá (6)
- Puerto Rico (43)
- Saint Kitts and Nevis (1)
- Suriname (1)
- Trinidad and Tobago (9)
- Turks and Caicos Islands (2)
