= St Croix East End Marine Park =

Protected area in the U.S. Virgin Islands

St. Croix East End Marine Park
- IUCN category V (protected landscape/seascape)
- Location within Saint Croix, U.S. Virgin Islands Location within the U.S. Virgin Islands
- Location: Virgin Islands, United States
- Coordinates: 17.7242533°N 64.650684°W
- Area: 60 sq.mi (155 sq. km)
- Established: January 9, 2003
- Governing body: Department of Planning and Natural Resources

The St. Croix East End Marine Park (STXEEMP) was established to "protect territorially significant marine resources, and promote sustainability of marine ecosystems, including coral reefs, sea grass beds, wildlife habitats and other resources, and to conserve and preserve significant natural areas for the use and benefit of future generations". It is the U.S. Virgin Islands’ first territorially designated and managed marine protected area (MPA).

The designation of STXEEMP unified and extended the previously identified territorially designated Areas of Particular Concern (APCs) at Great Pond Bay, East End, Chenay Bay, and the northern St. Croix Coral Reef System. STXEEMP encompasses nearshore habitats which are likely to interact with Buck Island Reef National Monument, and Lang Bank, a significant offshore fishing ground on the eastern edge of St. Croix’s subsea platform shelf. STXEEMP includes one of the most extensive, contiguous coral reef systems on the Puerto Rican/Virgin Islands shelf. The St Croix East End Marine Park encompasses an area of approximately 60 square miles (155 sq. km) along a shoreline of approximately 17 miles (27 km), from Green Cay on the north shore to Great Pond Bay on the south. The landward boundary of STXEEMP is the high-tide line; the STXEEMP is divided into management zones (see Rules and Regulations, below) that regulate activities. STXEEMP is entirely within territorial waters, and extends seaward to the 3 nautical mile limit for the Territory.

== History and Mission ==
The St. Croix East End Marine Park was established by ACT NO. 6572 Bill NO. 24-0308 which passed the Virgin Islands’ legislature on December 23, 2002, and was adopted January 9, 2003. STXEEMP is St. Croix’s first and only territorially-designated and managed marine protected area. The mission of the STXEEMP is to promote the responsible use and management of significant coastal and marine resources through research and monitoring, education, restoration, and community engagement to protect, and preserve the ecological and cultural value for residents and visitors.

== Habitats and Species ==
The STXEEMP encompasses seagrass meadows, shallow-water linear coral reefs (<10m), mid water (>10 m) patch coral reefs and deep mesophotic coral reefs (>30m). The shoreline boundaries of STXEEMP include numerous beaches, salt ponds and mangrove habitats. Great Pond, located at the southwestern shoreline boundary, is one of the largest remaining mangrove tracts on the island.

The seagrass meadows (principally composed of the seagrass species Thalassia testudinum and Syringodium filiforme) provide nursery and foraging areas for a variety of species of reef fish, stingrays, conch and other invertebrates. Seagrass beds also serve to anchor sand, and retain nutrients and sediment that wash down from the land.

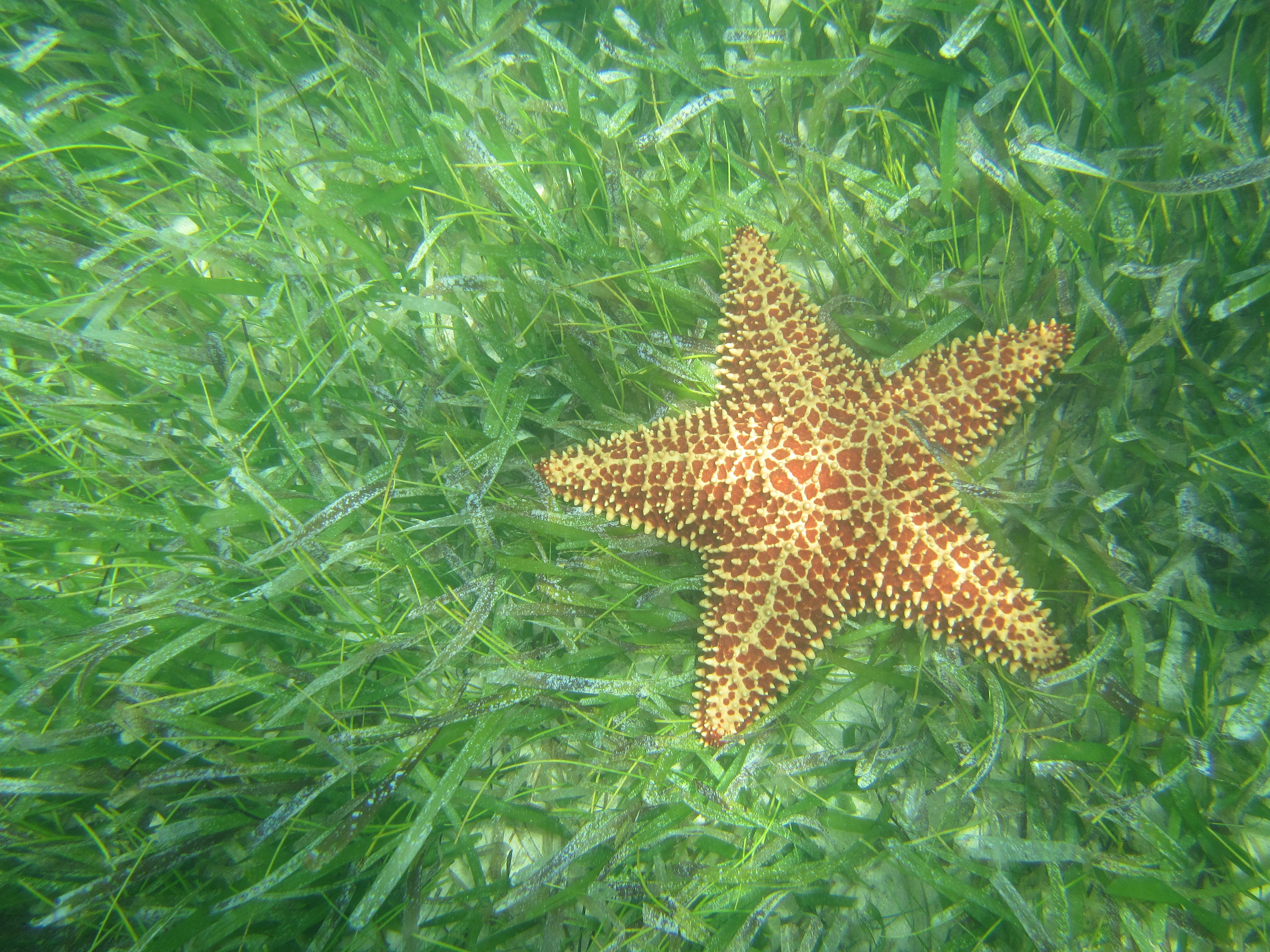
East End Marine Park: Cushion sea star Oreaster reticulatus in seagrass meadow off Cramer's Park.

Reefs provide shelter and foraging habitat for reef species, many of which are commercially important, either as a tourist attraction, a fishery or both. Mangroves serve as nurseries and shelter for juvenile fish, a catchment and filter for runoff and sediments, and provide critical shoreline protection from strong weather events. The mangrove habitat of Great Pond in particular also supports a large diversity of wintering shorebirds, and nesting habitat for resident species such as Least Tern Sterna antillarum, White-crowned Pigeons Patagioenas leucocephala (IUCN Near Threatened), Green-throated Carib Eulampis holosericeus, and a diversity of heron, egret and shorebird species.

Several commercially harvested species such as Queen Conch Strombus gigas, lobster Panulirus argus, whelk Cittarium pica, snapper Lutjanidae, grouper Serranidae and parrotfish Scaridae occur in STXEEMP. These species, and many others, are managed for sustainability and protected from harvest in certain areas (see below: No Take Zones).

Corals

Worldwide, Acropora corals are important reef-building species; in the Caribbean, Elkhorn Acropora palmata and Staghorn Acropora cervicornis have historically been the dominant species. Disease, in both corals and herbivorous sea urchins Diadema antillarum, coupled with rising seawater temperatures, have led to significant declines in coral cover and abundance throughout the Caribbean over the last half-century. Both of these Acropora species are currently found within STXEEMP; although their distribution is now patchy. These two species were listed as Threatened under the Endangered Species Act in 2006. A wide variety of other stony corals and soft corals also constitute the reef structures within STXEEMP.

Selected coral species in STXEEMP and their national/international status as of 2016:

| Scientific name | Common name | Species status (if any) (e.g. IUCN Red List, US Endangered Species Act) |
|---|---|---|
Stony Corals
| Acropora palmata | elkhorn coral | IUCN Critically Endangered, ESA Threatened |
| Acropora cervicornis | staghorn coral | IUCN Critically Endangered, ESA Threatened |
| Dendrogyra cylindrus | pillar coral | IUCN Vulnerable, ESA Threatened |
| Diploria clivosa | knobby brain coral | |
| Diploria strigosa | symmetrical brain coral | |
| Favia fragum | golfball coral | |
| Montastraea cavernosa | great star coral | |
| Orbicella annularis | lobed star coral | IUCN Endangered, ESA Threatened |
| Orbicella faveolata | mountainous star coral | ESA Threatened |
| Orbicella franksi | boulder star coral | ESA Threatened |
| Porites astreoides | mustard hill coral | |
| Porites porites | finger coral | |
| Siderastrea siderea | massive starlet coral | |
Soft Corals
| Gorgonia spp. | sea fans | |
| Millepora spp. | fire coral | |
| Pseudoplexaura, Plexaura spp. | sea rods | |

Turtles

St. Croix is a significant nesting ground for Leatherback (Dermochelys coriacea IUCN Vulnerable), green (Chelonia mydas IUCN Endangered) and hawksbill (Eretmochelys imbricata IUCN Critically Endangered) sea turtles; Green and Hawksbill turtles also forage in the island’s waters

These three species of sea turtles (leatherback, green and hawksbill) nest on beaches fringing STXEEMP. Technical partners, including The Nature Conservancy and St. Croix Environmental Association, conduct nest monitoring on several of these beaches. The easternmost beaches on the south shore (East End, Isaac, and Jack Bays) are important nesting grounds for green and hawksbill turtles from August through November. In 2015, 7 green turtles nesting on these beaches were fitted with satellite tags to track their movements; follow their progress at seaturtle.org. Turtles are federally protected under the Endangered Species Act and also under Territorial provisions; harassment and/or possession of any species of sea turtle or their eggs is not permitted. Federal and Territorial fines apply.

== Rules and regulations ==
STXEEMP is managed with multiple-use zoning regulations in order to provide for a variety of legal uses. There are 4 zones: Recreational, No Take, Turtle Wildlife Preserve, and Open Fishing. Only 8.6% of STXEEMP’s area is completely off-limits to fishing. The illustration to the right shows these zones and descriptions are below. A Storymap produced by the Park allows interactive exploration of the zones.

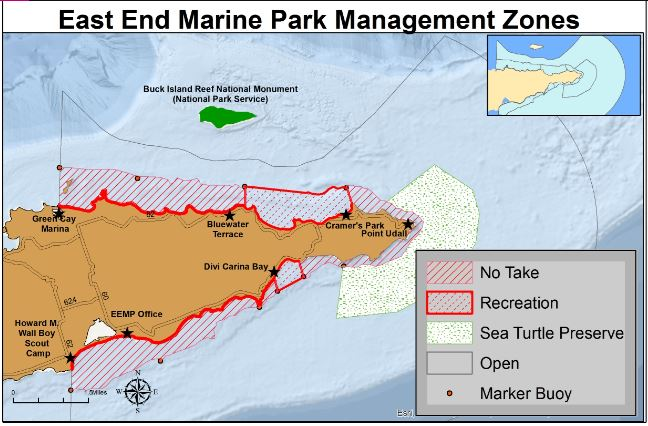
Map of the zones within the East End Marine Park, St. Croix USVi

- Recreation Areas, marked in water by buoys indicating RECREATION ZONE, provide areas for line fishing (from the beach to 100 ft from shore), and personal watercraft use; Marine Park permits may also be issued for bait fishing and catch and release guide fishing in this area. No other fishing or extraction (including spearfishing) is permitted. On the north shore, the shoreline fishing area extends from Green Cay to Cottongarden Point, and on the South Shore from Grapetree Point to Milord Point. In addition, the areas of Teague Bay to Cramer's Park on the north shore, and in Turner Hole on the south shore are Recreation Areas, which extend to 300 ft beyond the reef.
- No Take Areas, marked in water by buoys indicating NO TAKE, provide spawning, nursery, and permanent residence areas for the protection of marine life and habitats, particularly those not protected by fisheries management regulations. Diving with a flag and snorkeling are permitted in this area; no fishing or extraction of any kind (including spearfishing) is permitted.
  * On the Northshore, from Green Cay to Cottongarden Point, this area extends from 100 ft from shore to 300 ft beyond the reef.
  * From Cottongarden Point to Grapetree Point (around Point Udall) this area is from the beach to 300 ft beyond the reef.
  * On the south shore, this area extends from 100 ft from shore to 300 ft beyond the reef, and is in effect from Grapetree Point to Milord Point.
- The Turtle Wildlife Area, marked in water with buoys indicating WILDLIFE PRESERVE, is designated for the offshore waters of East End, Isaac and Jack Bays, which experience high densities of sea turtle nesting activity. The area extends to 1.25 miles from the beach.
- The Open Fishing Area has no restrictions on fishing, boating, or diving activities. This area is governed by all the rules and regulations pertaining to commercial and recreational fishing in the Virgin Islands Code and Rules and Regulations established by the Division of Fish & Wildlife. Trawling and general shipping are prohibited, as well as those activities inconsistent with STXEEMP’s long-term conservation (e.g., mining and oil drilling).

== Gallery ==
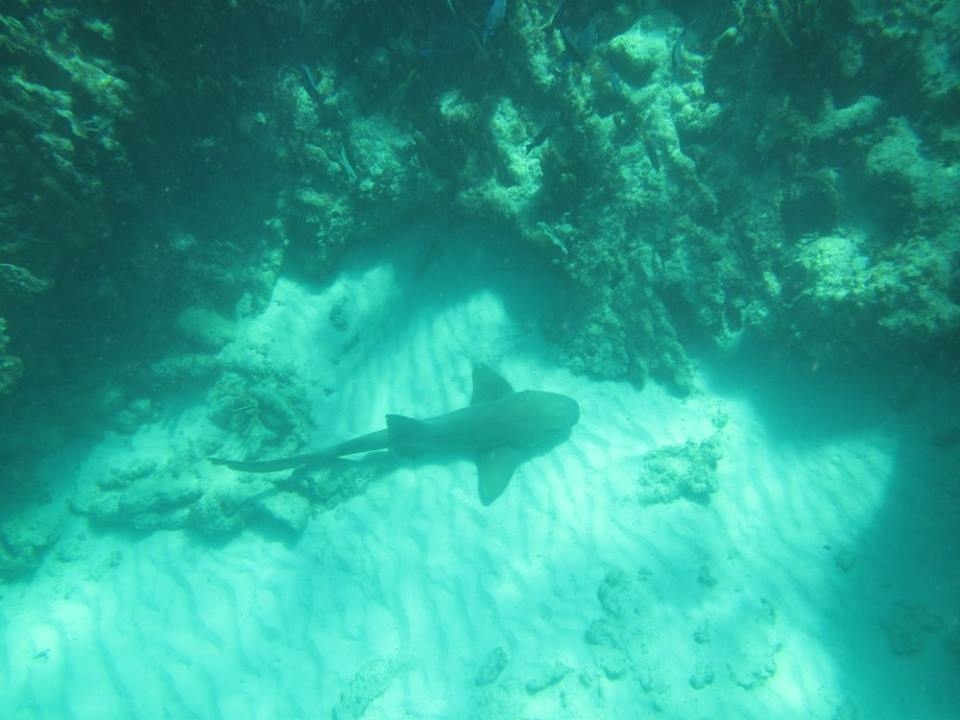
East End Marine Park: Nurse shark Ginglymostoma cirratum on the sands in Isaac Bay.

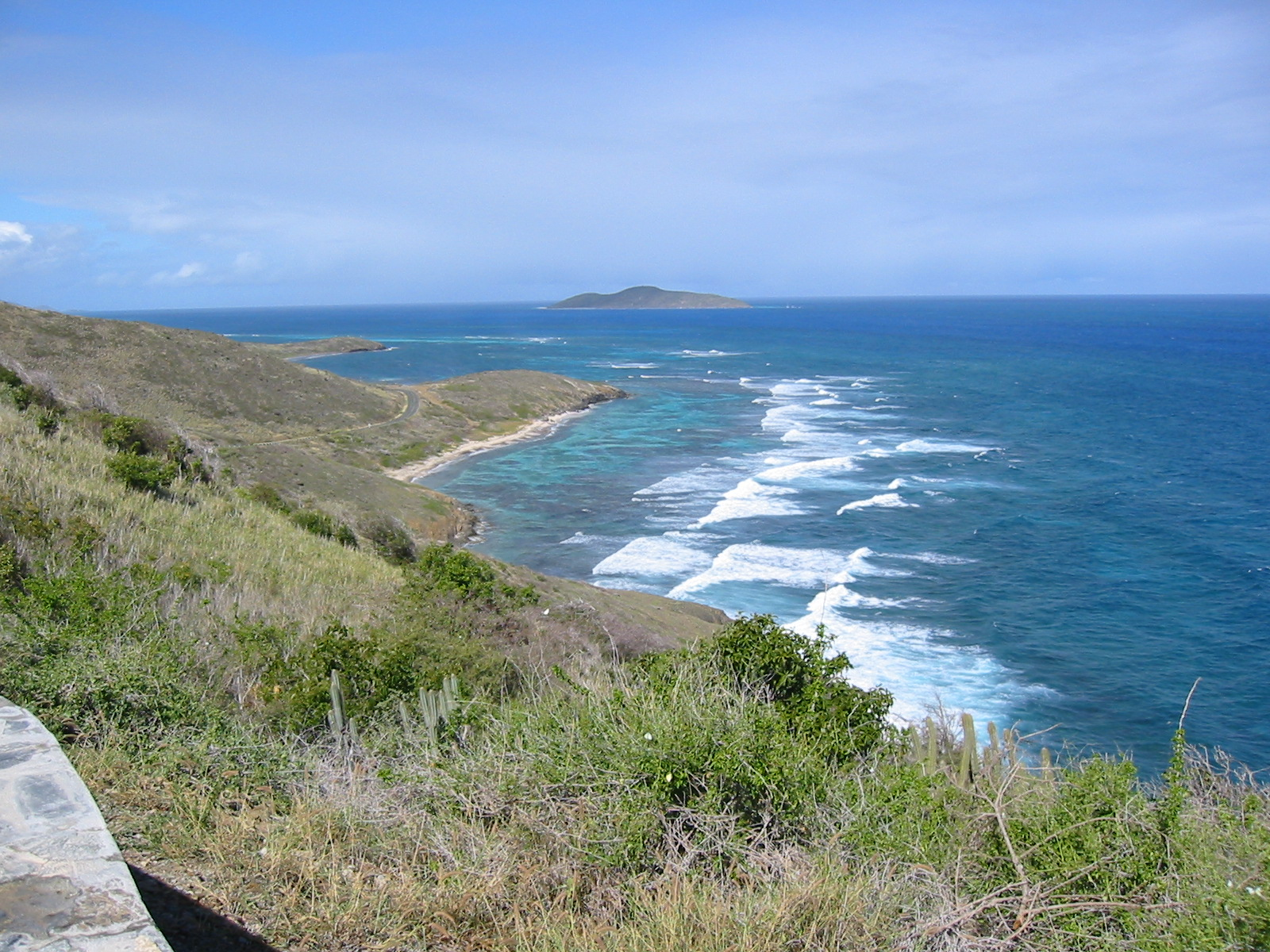
East End Marine Park: view of Boiler Bay on the North Shore of St. Croix, US Virgin Islands. Buck Island National Monument is in the background.

== Further Information and links ==
- An ESRI storymap about the East End Marine Park, produced in 2016
- The USVI Department of Planning and Natural Resources
- STXEEMP on Protected Planet
- STXEEMP on MPAtlas
- Fishing in the VI

Neighbors and Partners

- Friends of St Croix East End Marine Park
- Buck Island Reef National Monument
- Green Cay National Wildlife Refuge, US Fish and Wildlife Service
- NOAA’s Coral Reef Conservation Program
- The Nature Conservancy
- Reef Connect
- St. Croix Environmental Association

Scientific Studies and Further Information

- The Territorial Coral Reef Monitoring Program has long-term research sites throughout the US Virgin Islands.
- The Territory of the United States Virgin Islands and NOAA Coral Reef Conservation Program. 2010. United States Virgin Islands’ Coral Reef Management Priorities. Silver Spring, MD: NOAA.
- Buck Island BioMapper

Publications

- Andrews, Katherine, Jenny Wheaton, Larry Nall, Carl Beaver, Walt Jaap, et al. 2004. "16. Status of Coral Reefs in the U.S. Caribbean and Gulf of Mexico: Florida, Flower Garden Banks, Puerto Rico, U.S. Virgin Islands, Navassa". C. Wilkinson (ed.). Status of coral reefs of the world: 2004. Volume 2. Australian Institute of Marine Science, Townsville, Queensland, Australia. 431-450.
- Caselle, J. E., Hamilton, S. L., & Warner, R. R. (2003). The interaction of retention, recruitment, and density-dependent mortality in the spatial placement of marine reserves. Gulf and Caribbean Research, 14(2), 107-117.
- Clark, R., T. McGrath, and S. Hile. 2015. Biogeographic characterization of fish and benthic communities, St Croix, US Virgin Islands 2012-05-07 to 2012-05-18 (NODC Accession 0125237). Version 1.1. National Oceanographic Data Center, NOAA. Dataset.
- Dorfman, D. and US DOC; NOAA; NOS; National Centers for Coastal Ocean Science; Center for Coastal Monitoring and Assessment. 2014. Biological and physical geospatial data from St. Croix East End Marine Park, U.S. Virgin Islands from 6 Feb 2001 to 18 May 2012 (NODC Accession 0118500). Version 1.1. National Oceanographic Data Center, NOAA. Dataset.
- Fitzgerald, L.A., M.L.Treglia, N.Angeli, T.J. Hibbitts, D.J. Leavitt, A.L. Subalusky, I. Lundgren and Z. Hillis-Starr. 2015. Determinants of successful establishment and post-translocation dispersal of a new population of the critically endangered St. Croix ground lizard (Ameiva polops). Restoration Ecology. 23(6):776-786.
- Hubbard, Dennis K., ed. 1989. Terrestrial and Marine Geology of St. Croix, U.S. Virgin Islands. Special Publication Number 8. Christiansted, St. Croix: West Indies Laboratory/Fairleigh Dickinson University. 213 pp.
- Moran, David P., and Marjorie L. Reaka. 1988. Bioerosion and availability of shelter for benthic reef organisms. Marine Ecology Progress Series 44(3): 249-263.
- Multer, H. Gray and Lee C. Gerhard, eds. 1974. Guidebook to the Geology and Ecology of Some Marine and Terrestrial Environments, St. Croix, U.S. Virgin Islands. Christiansted, St. Croix: West Indies Laboratory/Fairleigh Dickinson University. 303 pp.
- Paddack, Michelle J., John D. Reynolds, Consuelo Aguilar, Richard S. Appeldoorn, Jim Beets, Edward W. Burkett, Paul M. Chittaro et al. 2009. Recent region-wide declines in Caribbean reef fish abundance. Current Biology 19 (7): 590-595.
- Pittman, S.J., D.S. Dorfman, S.D. Hile, C.F.G. Jeffrey, M.A. Edwards, and C. Caldow. 2013. Land-Sea Characterization of the St. Croix East End Marine Park, U.S. Virgin Islands. NOAA Technical Memorandum NOS NCCOS 170. Silver Spring, MD. 119 pp.
- Pittman, Simon, et al. 2008. Fish assemblages and benthic habitats of Buck Island Reef National Monument (St. Croix, US Virgin Islands) and the surrounding seascape: A characterization of spatial and temporal patterns. Biogeography Branch, Center for Coastal Monitoring and Assessment, NOAA/NOS/National Centers for Coastal Ocean Science.

St. Croix Geology

- Nagle, F., & Hubbard, D. K. (1989). St. Croix geology since Whetten: an introduction. In Proc 12th Caribbean Geol Conf, West Indies Laboratory (pp. 1–7).
- Speed, R. (1989). Tectonic evolution of St. Croix: implications for tectonics of the northeastern Caribbean. Terrestrial and Marine Geology of St. Croix, US Virgin Islands: West Indies Laboratory, Special Publication, (8), 9-22.
- Stanley, D. J. (1989). Sedimentology and paleogeography of Upper Cretaceous rocks, St. Croix, US Virgin Islands: new interpretations. In Terrestrial and Marine Geology of St. Croix, US Virgin Islands (Vol. 8, pp. 37–47). West Indies Laboratory, Spec. Publ.
