= Boulder coral =

Boulder coral may refer to:

- Boulder brain corals of the genus Colpophyllia
- Boulder star coral, two species of coral
