= Great Pond (Saint Croix) =

Lagoon of the US Virgin Islands

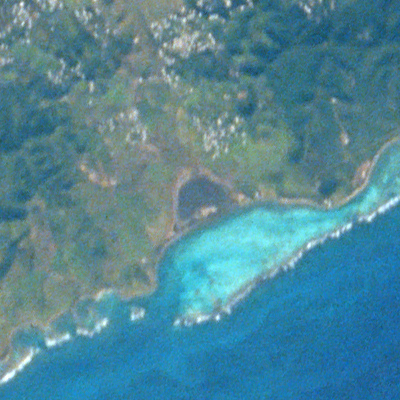
- Great Pond, St Croix

- Location within Saint Croix, U.S. Virgin Islands Location within the U.S. Virgin Islands
- Location: Saint Croix, U.S. Virgin Islands
- Coordinates: 17°43′31″N 64°39′24″W
- Type: Lagoon
- Catchment area: 470 hectares (1,200 acres)
- Max. length: 1,000 metres (3,300 ft)
- Max. width: 105 metres (344 ft)
- Surface area: 50 hectares (120 acres)
- Salinity: 20 to 40 parts per thousand
- Surface elevation: Sea level

Great Pond is a 50 ha saline coastal lagoon on the south-eastern shoreline of the island of Saint Croix in the United States Virgin Islands. The pond is part of St Croix East End Marine Park. It the second largest salt pond in the Virgin Islands, and is one of the largest remaining mangrove tracts in St. Croix.

== Description ==
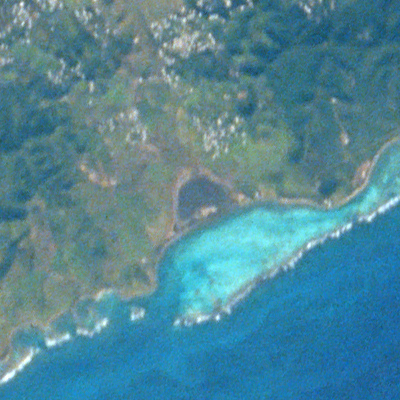
View of Great Pond (shadowed area)

The lagoon is separated from Great Pond Bay on its southern side by a vegetated baymouth bar about 1,100 m long, with a maximum width of 105 m. It connects with the sea by a narrow channel at its south-eastern corner. The perimeter of the lagoon is vegetated with black mangroves, and extensive mudflats are exposed when water levels are low. The salinity of the water in the lagoon varies between 20 and 40 parts per thousand, depending on rainfall and groundwater runoff in the 470 ha catchment. There is a small settlement of about 100 houses in the watershed of the lagoon, mainly on its north-eastern side.

== History ==
Great Pond and its surrounding mudflats were historically used by the people of St. Croix to fish, crab and gather salt. The area has had human inhabitants in the area for centuries. Excavations have uncovered human remains in the Great Pond area from 300-700 A.D. as well as 700-900 A.D. In the 18th century, a 430-acre (170 ha) plantation called Great Pond plantation occupied the area around the Great Pond. A map from 1920 indicates a fan mill (labeled "Great Pond Bay Mill") located just north of Great Pond. The name of the mill suggests it may have been part of the Great Pond plantation.

Beginning in the 1990s, the mangroves in the Great Pond began expanding coverage, adding small islands of mangrove trees within the pond. The pond transitioned from an open-water system to a closed salt pond. In 2015, mangroves in the interior of the pond died off. This resulted in a grey-colored landscape within the pond. The channel that had supplied the pond with its saltwater closed up, due to accumulation of sand and buildup of organic debris.

== Important bird area ==
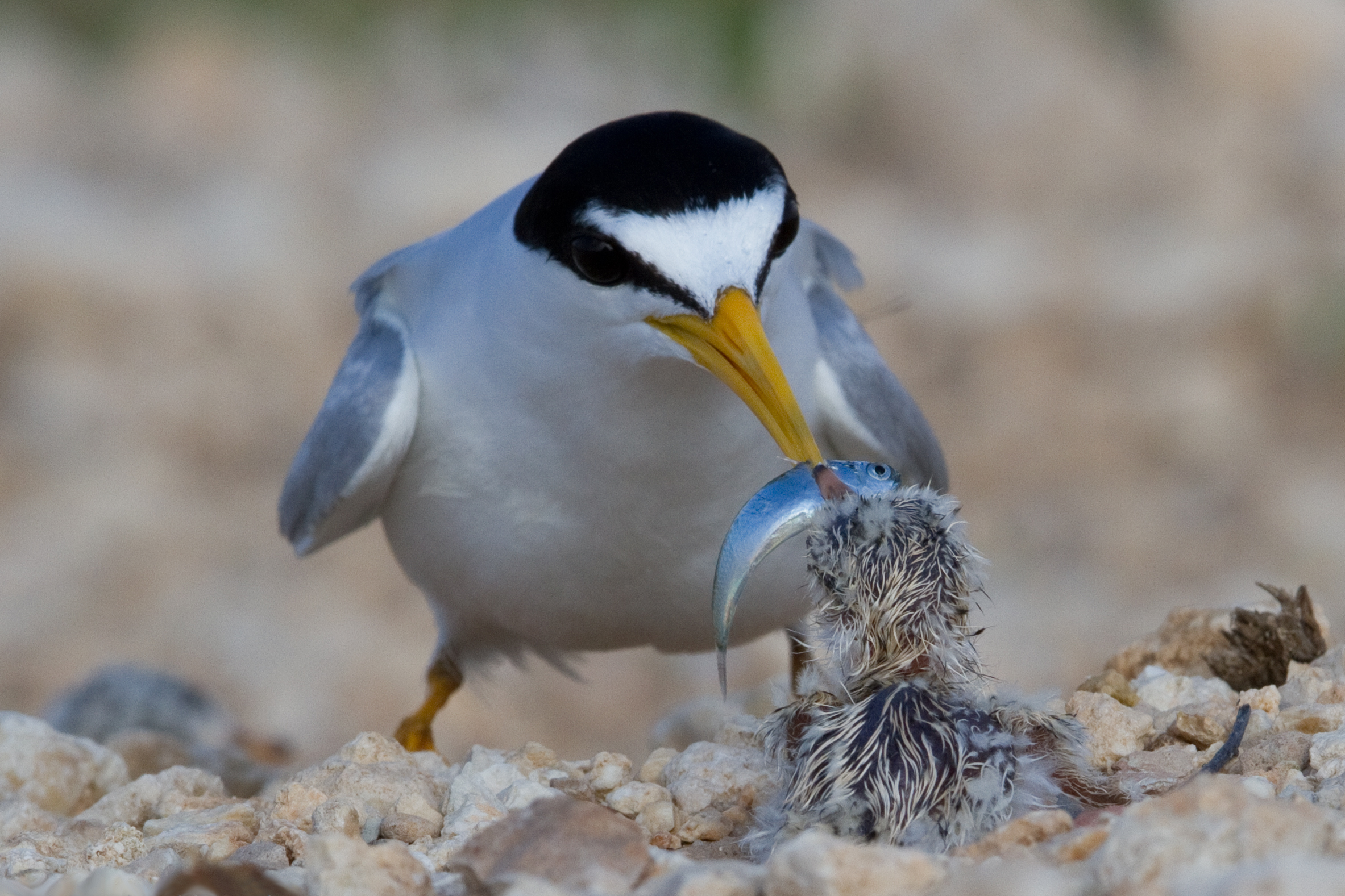
Least terns nest in the IBA

A 64 ha area, encompassing the lagoon and its immediate wetland surrounds, has been recognised as an Important Bird Area (IBA) by BirdLife International because it supports populations of white-crowned pigeons, green-throated caribs, Antillean crested hummingbirds and Caribbean elaenias, as well as a breeding colony of least terns.
