= Boulder star coral =

Boulder star coral may refer to two different species of coral:

- Orbicella annularis, a species of coral in the family Merulinidae
- Orbicella franksi, a species of coral in the family Merulinidae
