= House of Intuition =

American chain of spiritual stores

House of Intuition is an American chain of metaphysical and spiritual supply stores, with locations in California and Florida. Founded by Alex Naranjo and Marlene Vargas during a period of bankruptcy, the original store is located in the Echo Park neighborhood of Los Angeles.

A modern variety of botánica, House of Intuition is known for products including manifestation candles, crystals, and altar supplies, and psychic services including astrological and tarot card readings.

Naranjo and Vargas authored a book called Your Intuition Led You Here: Daily Rituals for Empowerment, Inner Knowing and Magic, released in December 2021 by Penguin Random House.

== Locations ==
- Costa Mesa, California
- Echo Park, California
- Long Beach, California
- Miami, Florida
- Sherman Oaks, California
- West Hollywood, California
