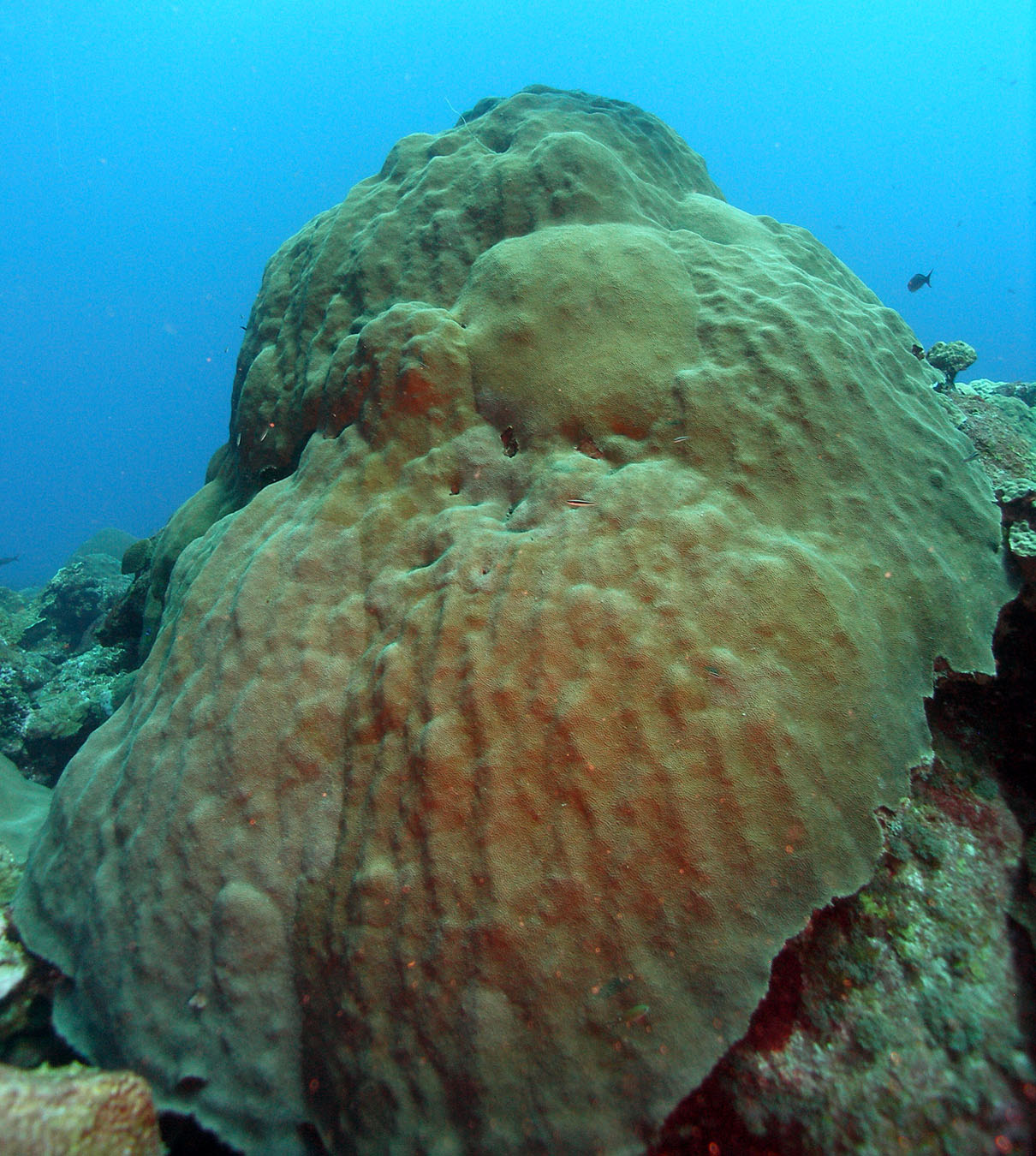

Conservation status
- Endangered (IUCN 3.1)

- Imperiled (NatureServe)

Scientific classification
- Kingdom: Animalia
- Phylum: Cnidaria
- Subphylum: Anthozoa
- Class: Hexacorallia
- Order: Scleractinia
- Family: Merulinidae
- Genus: Orbicella
- Species: O. faveolata

Binomial name
- Orbicella faveolata (Ellis and Solander, 1786)

Synonyms
- Montastraea faveolata (Ellis & Solander, 1786)

= Orbicella faveolata =

Species of coral

Orbicella faveolata, commonly known as mountainous star coral, is a colonial stony coral in the family Merulinidae. Orbicella faveolata is native to the coral coast of the Caribbean Sea and the Gulf of Mexico and is listed as endangered by the International Union for Conservation of Nature. O. faveolata was formerly known as Montastraea faveolata.

== Description ==
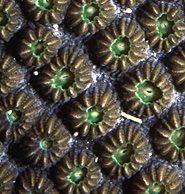
Close-up of corallites

Colonies of this coral are solid and very large, forming a mound with a skirt. The surface is smooth and undulating, with small lumps, bulges or lobes. The corallites, the stony cups in which the polyps sit, are about 5 mm (0.2 in) in diameter and cover the entire surface of the coral. The colour is usually a pale brown, yellowish green and grey but may be deep brown, with fluorescent green highlights. This coral is part of a species complex including the closely related Orbicella annularis and Orbicella franksi, but the former has more distinct nodules or small columns and the latter has a more irregular, lumpy surface.

== Distribution and habitat ==
Orbicella faveolata occurs in shallow waters in the Caribbean Sea and the Gulf of Mexico, its range including Florida, united states, the Bahamas, Venezuela and possibly Bermuda. It is found on both the back reef and fore reef slopes of fringing reefs at depths of up to 40 m (131 ft). It is often the most abundant coral species on fore reef slopes between 10 and 20 m (33 and 66 ft).

== Biology ==
Like other corals, Orbicella faveolata has a symbiotic relationship with dinoflagellates in the family Symbiodiniaceae. These symbionts are commonly known as zooxanthellae and large numbers are present in the coral's living tissue. Several different species of Symbiodiniaceae associate with the coral, depending on the degree of light intensity reaching the part of the surface where they reside. When artificial shading was applied by researchers to corals for some weeks, the endosymbionts died out in the shaded portion. When the light was restored, zooxanthellae became reinstated, but in many instances, the original species was replaced by a different species of Symbiodiniaceae.

A coral has a very diverse microbiome, an ecological community of micro-organisms. The zooxanthellae, bacteria and archaea present are quite dynamic and are affected by the health of the coral. Orbicella corals are affected by multiple diseases including yellow-band disease.

Orbicella faveolata is related to the coral species lobed star coral (Orbicella annularis) and the species boulder star coral (Orbicella franksi), all exist in the Caribbean Sea and the Gulf of Mexico in areas such as the Bahamas and Bermuda. The species Paramontastraea saleborsa and Astrea curta have similarly sized corallites. The species P. saleborsa was also formally placed in the coral genus Montastraea.

== Status ==
Orbicella faveolata is a slow-growing species and the rate at which new colonies are formed is less than the rate at which mature colonies die. It is susceptible to bleaching and to several coral diseases including stony coral tissue loss disease, yellow-band disease, black band disease and white plague. Numbers of individuals are believed to have declined by over 50% in the last thirty years and the International Union for Conservation of Nature lists its conservation status as being endangered.
