= Mónica Medina =

American scientist

- Born: Cali, Colombia
- Website: www.medinalab.org

Mónica Medina is a professor of ecology and evolutionary biology at the University of California, Los Angeles. She is known for environmental activism, such as fighting to protect Varadero Reef in Cartagena, Colombia, her pioneering work in coral genomics, and her research on the ecology and evolution of symbiosis by studying the relationships between cnidarians, endosymbiotic dinoflagellates, and other microbes.

== Education ==
Medina was born and raised in Cali, Colombia. She studied Biology at the Universidad de Los Andes before pursuing her Ph.D. in Marine Biology & Fisheries at the University of Miami under the guidance of Patrick Walsh. She described the phylogeny and population genetics of sea hares. She was a post-doctoral fellow at the Marine Biological Laboratory under Mitchell Sogin during which time she explored the phylogeny and cellular complexity of fungi and metazoans.

== Career and research ==
Mónica Medina was a research scientist at the Joint Genome Institute from 2001-2005 and founding faculty member as assistant professor at the University of California, Merced. Medina pioneered the use of genomic approaches to study coral reef science and was the first to bring genomics to coral biology. She led the use of genomics for coral-algal symbiosis for studying bleaching and disease and was awarded a Fulbright Scholarship to work in France, the prestigious Guggenheim Memorial Foundation Award for her excellence in research, and the Presidential Early Career Award for Scientists and Engineers (PECASE) in 2007. Upon moving to the Pennsylvania State University, she expanded research to study coral microbiomes. She has published on the population genomic approaches to evolutionary biology and comparative genomics of model cnidarians including Cassiopea, and Orbicella faveolata. She is a founding member of the Global Invertebrate Genomics Alliance (GIGA). She is part of Penn State's Microbiome Center. She is an invited member of the Council for the Advancement of Science Writing. In 2025, Medina moved to the University of California, Los Angeles, as a professor in the Department of Ecology and Evolutionary Biology, where her group continues research on coral genomics, evolution, conservation and restoration, and ancient coral DNA.

She has studied Varadero reef near Cartagena, Colombia, and been an active promoter of community involvement to save the reef. Dr. Medina was part of the team that produced the nature documentary, Saving Atlantis, which has been shown across the world in several languages.

== Diversity and inclusion in science ==
She has promoted underrepresented minorities in STEM through her involvement with activities including the Committee on Equity and Diversity, and in training students, such as National Science Foundation INCLUDES initiatives, the Bridge to PhD for bringing Master's students from University of the Virgin Islands to Penn State. She was the impetus for the establishment of a Society for the Advancement of Chicanos/Hispanics and Native Americans in Science (SACNAS) chapter at Penn State. Her lab provides outreach activities to elementary schools about the importance of corals.
