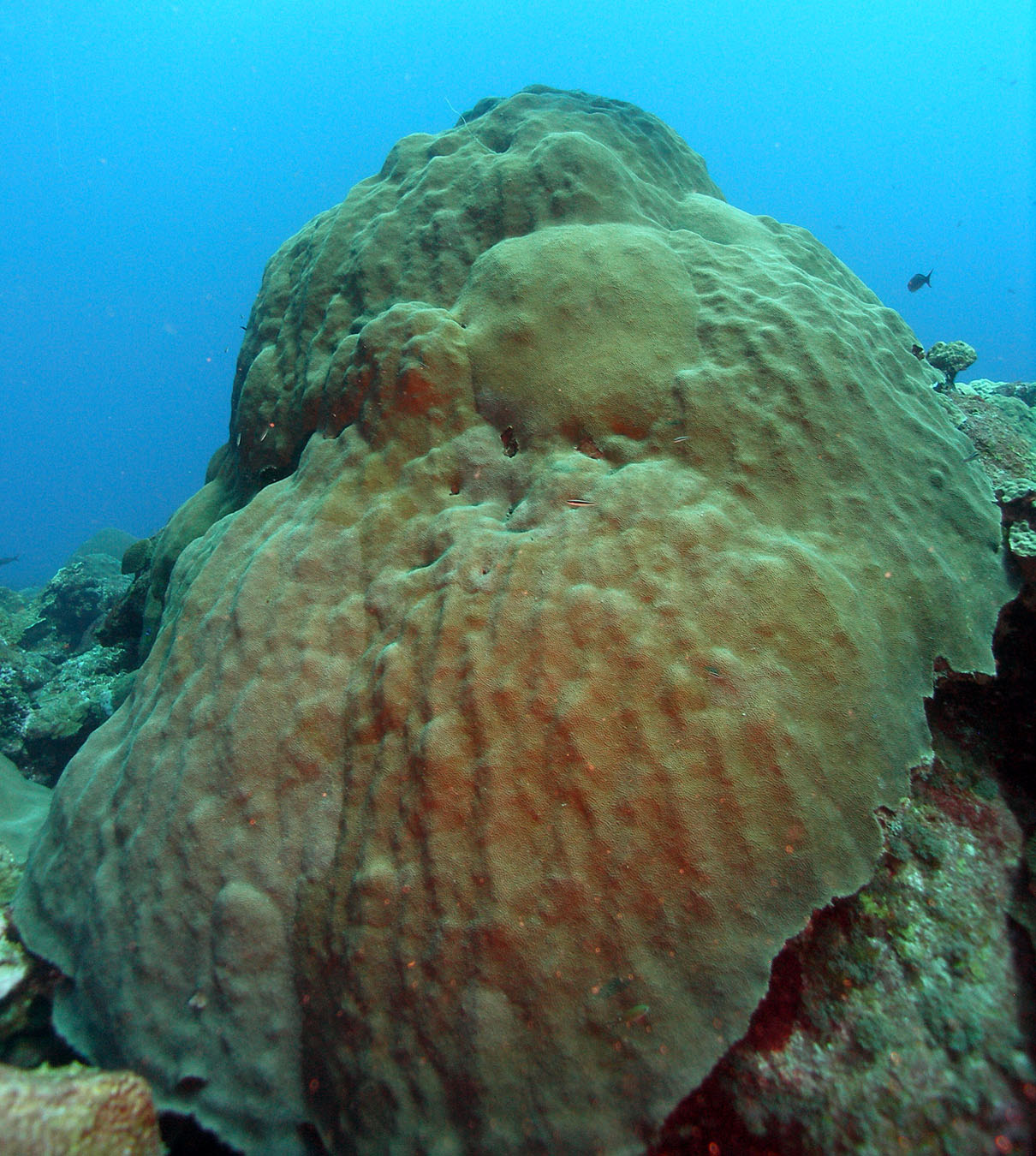
- Orbicella faveolata

Scientific classification
- Kingdom: Animalia
- Phylum: Cnidaria
- Subphylum: Anthozoa
- Class: Hexacorallia
- Order: Scleractinia
- Family: Merulinidae
- Genus: Orbicella; Dana, 1846

Species
- See text

= Orbicella =

Genus of corals

Orbicella is a genus of stony corals in the Merulinidae family. The Orbicella species complex comprises three sister species, namely Orbicella faveolata, Orbicella annularis and Orbicella franksi, all of which are shallow-water, zooxanthellate species and are native to the tropical western Atlantic Ocean, the Caribbean Sea and the Gulf of Mexico.

These corals are ubiquitous and major reef-builders in the Caribbean. Their similar colony morphologies misled scientists to historically lump them into a single species, Montastraea annularis, which included three morphotypes “bumpy”, “columnar” and “massive”. These growth forms were believed to arise as a response to abiotic factors (e.g., depth, light availability). This taxonomic classification was challenged by further ecological, reproductive, genetic, and morphologic evidence, which led to the re-description of three separate species, Montastraea faveolata (massive), M. annularis (columnar) and M. franksi (bumpy).

A taxonomic revision published in 2012 established that the “Montastraea annularis species complex” formed a separate clade now in the genus Orbicella with three species names (O. faveolata, O. annularis, O. franksi). O. annularis and O. faveolata are commonly called the boulder star coral and the mountainous star coral, respectively.

== Characteristics ==
The colonies of these corals are massive and form dome-shaped mounds, with uneven surfaces and bulging projections. The corallites are small and closely packed. These corals are mostly some shade of light brown but sometimes have green oral discs.

=== Skeleton properties ===
Orbicella skeleton is made from CaCO_{3} in the crystal form of aragonite. The growth rate has been correlated with depth. In addition, the skeleton also contains brucite [Mg(OH)_{2}] in the interseptal spaces (microbialites). These brucite particles encrusts microbes growing inside the coral skeleton.

== Speciation and reproductive barriers ==
Speciation is the gradual process by which species originate. Speciation can be studied from many perspectives, but regardless of the point of view it often requires reproductive isolation between species. In the case of the Orbicella, these species are broadcast spawner corals and release gametes annually in the same evening into the water column. The night of spawning is normally in August and September, the warmest months of the year, and five to eight nights after the full moon. Some authors argue these species, specifically O. annularis and O. faveolata, spawn simultaneously, but most reports support that the Orbicella species are temporally isolated by a few hours. It is thought that the specific timing of these spawning events is dictated by light availability and perceived sunset/moonrise times. Sperm and eggs are released packed in small bundles that break open when they reach the water surface due to the surface tension. Timing is important to improve the chances of gametes finding each other in the water column. Hybridization studies reported some success in crossing O. annularis and O. franksi. Yet crosses with O. faveolata are consistently unsuccessful. However, these crosses were done in laboratory conditions that are not natural (covering O. annularis in advance to trick it into spawning earlier) so these crosses are unlikely to occur in nature. Furthermore, in nature gametes get diluted and age quickly. Hence, Orbicella species are reproductively isolated by at least these two ways, allowing for species distinction and evolution.

== Species ==
The following species are currently recognized by the World Register of Marine Species :

- Orbicella annularis (Ellis & Solander, 1786)
- Orbicella faveolata (Ellis & Solander, 1786)
- Orbicella franksi (Gregory, 1895)
