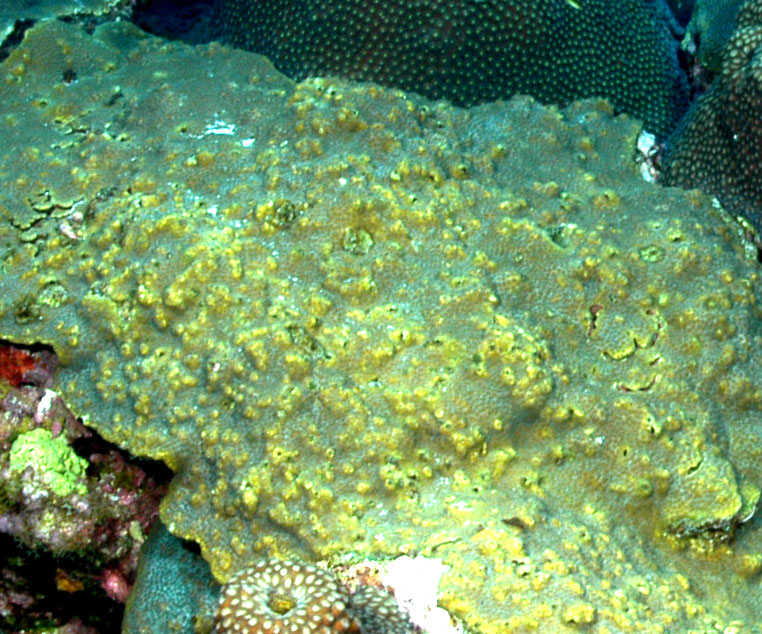

Conservation status
- Near Threatened (IUCN 3.1)

- Vulnerable (NatureServe)

Scientific classification
- Kingdom: Animalia
- Phylum: Cnidaria
- Subphylum: Anthozoa
- Class: Hexacorallia
- Order: Scleractinia
- Family: Merulinidae
- Genus: Orbicella
- Species: O. franksi

Binomial name
- Orbicella franksi (Gregory, 1895)

Synonyms
- Montastraea franksi (Gregory, 1895); Echinopora franksi Gregory, 1895

= Orbicella franksi =

Species of coral

Orbicella franksi, commonly known as boulder star coral, is a colonial stony coral in the family Merulinidae. It is native to shallow waters in the Caribbean Sea, the Gulf of Mexico, the Bahamas, Bermuda and Florida, and is listed as a near-threatened species by the International Union for Conservation of Nature.

== Taxonomy ==
Until recently this coral, along with Orbicella faveolata, was thought to be a variety of Orbicella annularis. There is very little morphological difference between them but studies have shown differences in corallite structure, life history, allozymes and distribution. All three members of this species complex used to be placed in the genus Montastraea.

== Description ==
Colonies of Orbicella franksi usually form massive clumps with uneven surfaces, but sometimes forms plates, and in shady positions, may be encrusting. The general colour is orange-brown, greenish-brown or greyish-brown, but the extremities of the lumps are often pale or white. The corallites (the cups in which the polyps sit) are small, measuring 3.5 mm (0.14 in) across. The growing edges of this coral bear both large and small corallites which is in contrast to the closely related Orbicella faveolata, which has regularly spaced corallites at its growing edges.

== Distribution and habitat ==
Orbicella franksi is native to the Caribbean Sea and the Gulf of Mexico, including Florida, the Bahamas and Bermuda. It typically grows on fore reefs (where it may be the most common species of coral) and its depth range is 5 to 50 metres (16 to 164 ft) but it is typically found at depths of between 15 and 30 metres (49 and 98 ft).

== Status ==
Orbicella franksi seems to be more resistant to coral diseases than some members of its genus, but is still susceptible to coral plague, yellow-band disease, black band disease and coral bleaching. The major threats it faces include climate change, ocean acidification and destruction of its reef habitat. The International Union for Conservation of Nature has rated its conservation status as being near threatened.
