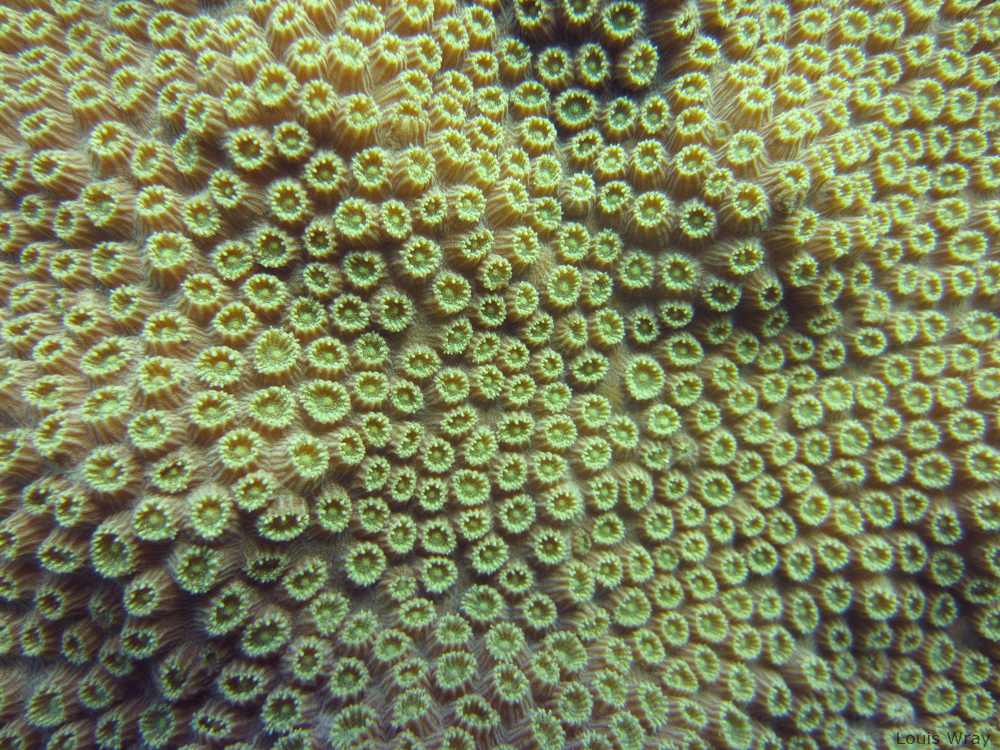

Conservation status
- Endangered (IUCN 3.1)

- Imperiled (NatureServe)

Scientific classification
- Kingdom: Animalia
- Phylum: Cnidaria
- Subphylum: Anthozoa
- Class: Hexacorallia
- Order: Scleractinia
- Family: Merulinidae
- Genus: Orbicella
- Species: O. annularis

Binomial name
- Orbicella annularis (Ellis and Solander, 1786)

Synonyms
- List: Astrea annularis (Ellis & Solander, 1786); Heliastrea annularis (Ellis & Solander, 1786); Madrepora annularis Ellis & Solander, 1786; Montastraea annularis (Ellis & Solander, 1786); Montastrea annularis (Ellis & Solander, 1786) [lapsus]

= Orbicella annularis =

Species of coral

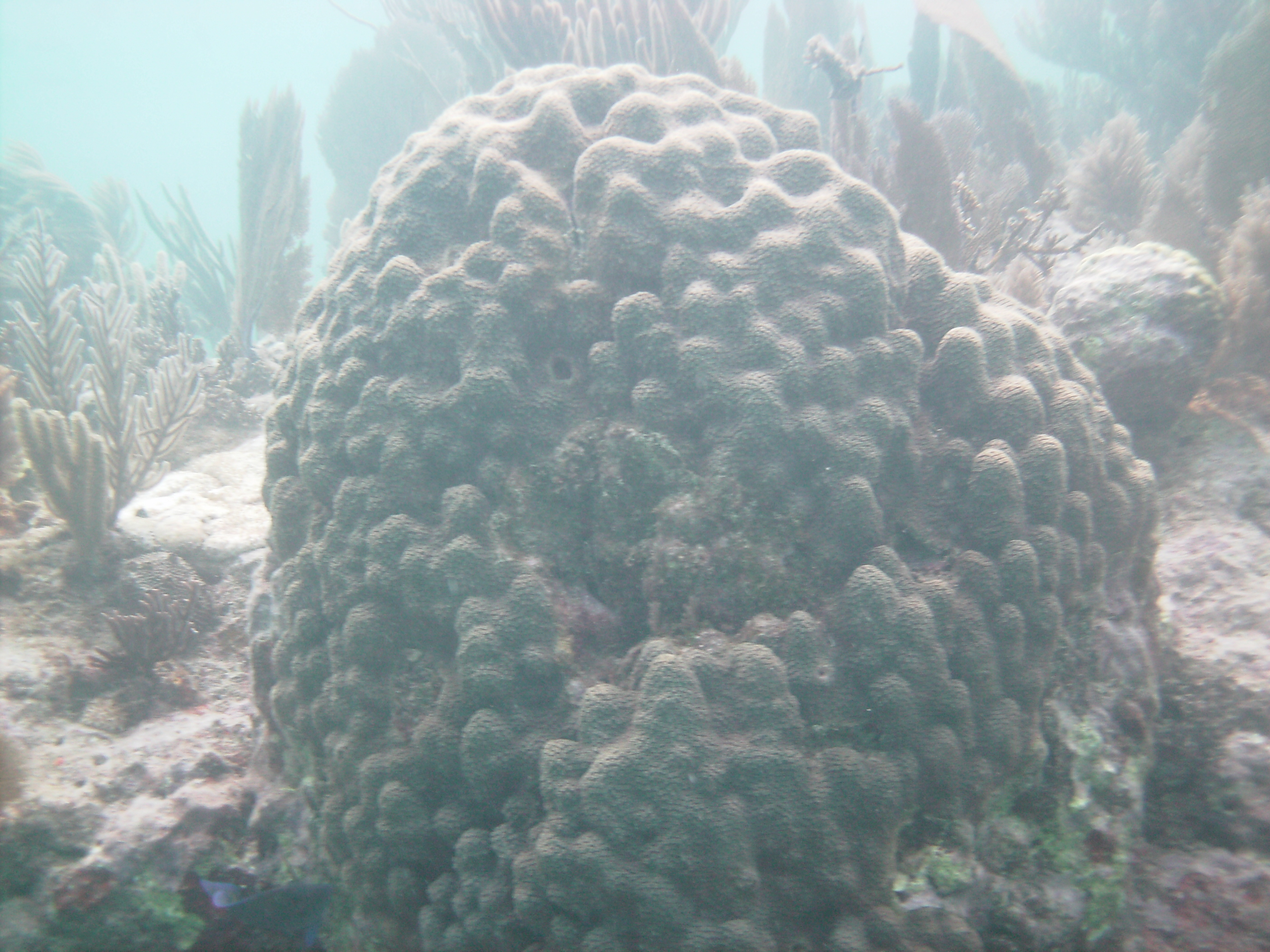
Orbicella annularis at Molasses Reef, Florida Keys

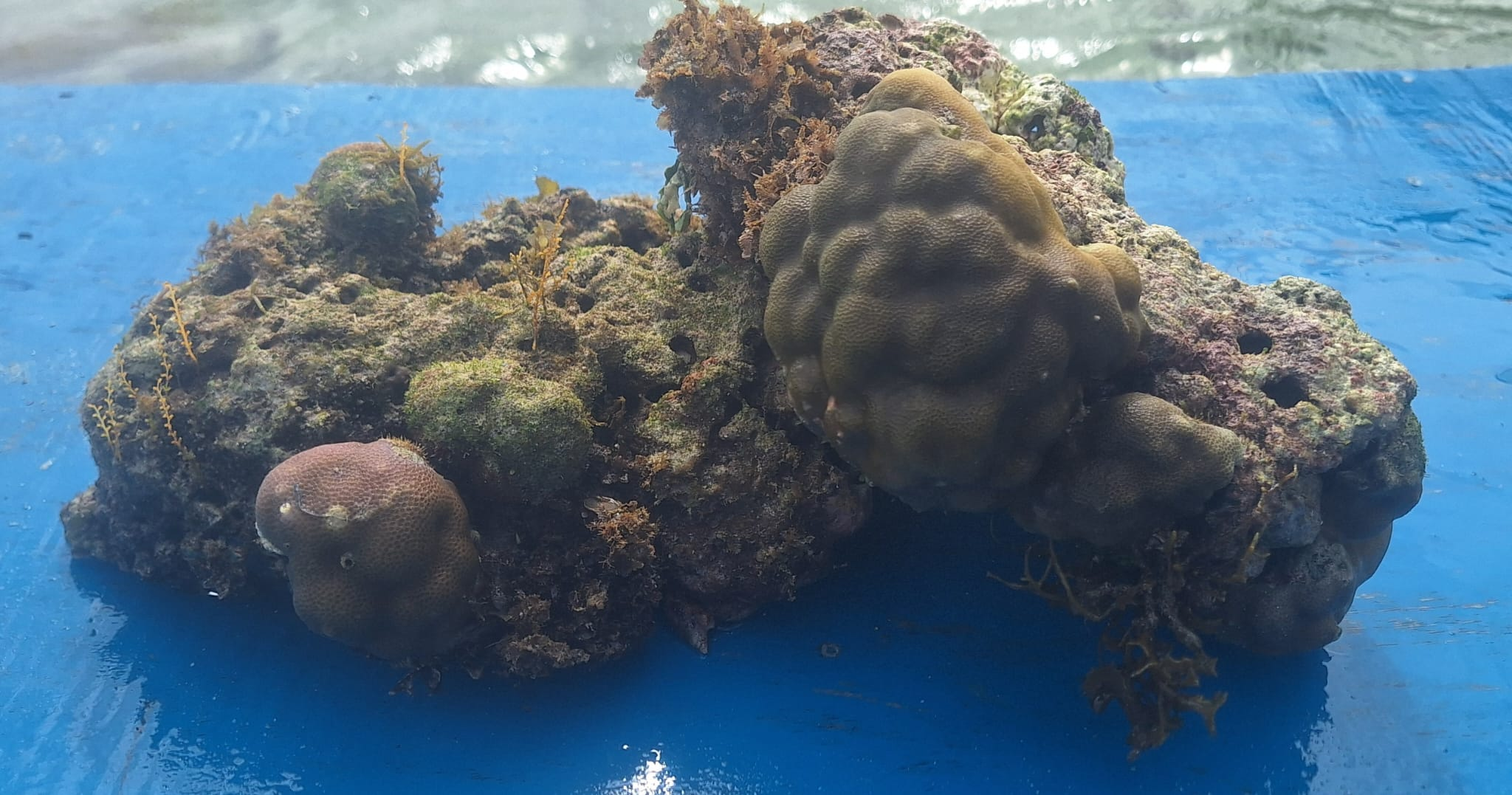
Boulder star coral found in the Philippines

Orbicella annularis, commonly known as the Boulder star coral, is a species of coral that lives in the western Atlantic Ocean and is the most thoroughly studied and most abundant species of reef-building coral in the Caribbean to date. It also has a comprehensive fossil record within the Caribbean. This species complex has long been considered a generalist that exists at depths between 0 and 80 metres (0 and 262 ft) and grows into varying colony shapes (heads, columns, plates) in response to differing light conditions. Only recently with the help of molecular techniques has O. annularis been shown to be a complex of at least three separate species. Those species are divided into O. annularis, O. faveolata, and O. franksi. This coral was originally described as Montastraea annularis.
