= .us =

Top-level Internet domain for the United States

us
- Introduced: February 15, 1985; 41 years ago
- TLD type: Country code top-level domain
- Status: Active
- Registry: Registry Services, LLC (owned by GoDaddy)
- Sponsor: National Telecommunications and Information Administration
- Intended use: Entities connected with the United States
- Actual use: Used in the United States but not as widely as gTLDs: U.S. state, tribal, and local governments (declining in favor of .gov); Some American businesses as alternative to .com; Domain hacks (e.g. del.icio.us)
- Registered domains: 2,053,374 (December 2023)
- Registration restrictions: Connection with the U.S. requirement can be enforced by challenge but rarely is
- Structure: 2nd-level registrations allowed; originally only 3rd- or 4th-level registrations in a complex hierarchy
- Documents: RFC 1480; USDoC agreements with Neustar; Other policies
- Dispute policies: usTLD Dispute Resolution Policy (usDRP)
- DNSSEC: Yes
- Registry website: about.us

.us is the Internet country code top-level domain (ccTLD) for the United States. It was established in February 1985. Registrants of us domains must be U.S. citizens, residents, or organizations – or foreign entities with a presence in the United States or a territory of the United States. Most registrants in the U.S. have registered for .com, .net, .org and other gTLDs, instead of us, which has primarily been used by state and local governments, even though private entities may also register us domains. The domain is managed by Registry Services, LLC, an acquired subsidiary domain name registry of GoDaddy, on behalf of the United States Department of Commerce.

The us domain is less commonly used by American businesses and enterprises than the internationally more common .com.

== History ==
On February 15, 1985, us was created as the Internet's first ccTLD. Its original administrator was Jon Postel of the Information Sciences Institute (ISI) at the University of Southern California (USC). He administered us under a subcontract that the ISI and USC had from SRI International (which held the us and the gTLD contract with the United States Department of Defense) and later Network Solutions (which held the us and the gTLD contract with the National Science Foundation).

Postel and his colleague Ann Westine Cooper codified the us ccTLD's policies in December 1992 as RFC 1386 and revised them the following June in RFC 1480. Registrants could only register third-level domains or higher in a geographic and organizational hierarchy. From June 1993 to June 1997, Postel delegated the vast majority of the geographic subdomains under us to various public and private entities. us registrants could register with the delegated manager for the specific zone they wished to register in, but not directly with the us administrator. In July 1997, Postel instituted a "50/500 rule" that limited each delegated manager to 500 localities maximum, 50 in a given state.

In June 1998, Postel raised the possibility of covering IANA operating costs by charging locality name registrars, who would pass the costs along to individual registrants. In September 1998, the United States Postal Service proposed funding the operations in order to assume control of us, as part of a plan to diversify away from postage revenue. On October 1, 1998, the NSF transferred oversight of the us domain to the National Telecommunications and Information Administration (NTIA) of the United States Department of Commerce. Postel died that month, leaving his domain administration responsibilities with ISI. In December 2000, these responsibilities were transferred to Network Solutions, which had recently been acquired by Verisign.

On October 26, 2001, Neustar was awarded the contract to administer us. On April 24, 2002, second-level domains under us became available for registration. One of the first us domain hacks, icio.us, was registered on May 3, 2002, for the creation of the subdomain del.icio.us. A moratorium was placed on additional delegations of locality-based namespaces, and Neustar became the default delegate for undelegated localities. Neustar's contract was renewed by the National Telecommunications and Information Administration (NTIA) in 2007, 2014, and most recently in 2019 for a term of 10 years.

On March 31, 2019, the us registry made it clear that under its Acceptable Use Policy it would not allow the sale of opioids through the us top level domain.

In Q2 2020, GoDaddy acquired Neustar's registry business.

== Locality namespace ==
The us ccTLD is historically organized under a complex locality namespace hierarchy. Until second-level registrations were introduced in 2002, us permitted only fourth-level domain registrations of the form organization-name.locality.state.us, with some exceptions for government entities. Registrants of locality-based domains must meet the same criteria as in the rest of the us ccTLD. Though the locality namespace is most commonly used for government entities, it is also open to registrations by private businesses and individuals. Since 2002, second-level domain registrations have eclipsed those in the locality namespace, and many local governments have transitioned to .org and other TLDs. In the 2010s, the first top-level domains for U.S. cities became available as paid alternatives to third-level locality domains, including .nyc as an alternative to .new-york.ny.us.

Many locality-based zones of us are delegated to various public and private entities known as delegated managers. Domains in these zones are registered through the delegated manager, rather than through GoDaddy. As the delegated managers are expected to receive requests directly from registrants, few if any domain name registrars serve this space, possibly contributing to its lower visibility and utilization. RFC 1480 describes the rationale for the locality namespace's deep hierarchy and local delegation:

One concern is that things will continue to grow dramatically, and this will require more subdivision of the domain name management. Maybe the plan for the US Domain is overkill on growth planning, but there has never been overplanning for growth yet.

This hierarchical system has proven unappealing to companies that operate nationally or globally.

As of October 31, 2013, 12,979 domains were registered under the locality namespace, of which 3,653 were managed by about 1,300 delegated managers while 9,326 were managed by Neustar as the de facto manager. According to a 2013 survey of 539 delegated managers, 282 were state or local government agencies, while 98 were private individuals and 85 were commercial Internet service providers. Nearly 90% of the respondents offer domain registrations for free.

The .au and .ca ccTLDs have also established third- and fourth-level locality namespaces, though the .ca locality namespace is no longer open to registrations. The .cn ccTLD maintains a third-level locality namespace in general use.

=== States and territories ===
A two-letter second-level domain is formally reserved for each U.S. state, federal territory, and the District of Columbia. Each domain corresponds to a USPS abbreviation. For example, .ny.us is reserved for websites affiliated with New York, while .va.us is for those affiliated with Virginia. Second-level domains are also reserved for five U.S. territories: .as.us for American Samoa, .gu.us for Guam, .mp.us for the Northern Mariana Islands, .pr.us for Puerto Rico, and .vi.us for the U.S. Virgin Islands. However, these domains go unused because each territory has its own ccTLD per ISO 3166-1 alpha-2: respectively, .as, .gu, .mp, .pr, and .vi.

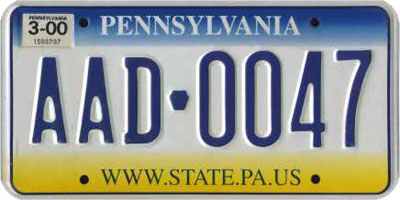
Vehicle registration plates of Pennsylvania bore the URL www.state.pa.us from September 1999 to December 2004.

A state's main government portal is usually found at the third-level domain state.state.us, which is reserved for this purpose. However, some state administrations prefer .gov domains: for example, California's government portal is located at www.ca.gov. Other than for state governments, no third-level domain registrations are permitted under state or territory second-level domains.

A few additional names are reserved at the second level for government agencies that are not subordinate to a state government:

- fed.us for agencies of the U.S. federal government (historical; superseded by .gov)
  - Example: www.fs.fed.us (formerly the United States Forest Service)
- isa.us for interstate authorities created by interstate compacts
  - Example: imcc.isa.us (Interstate Mining Compact Commission)
- nsn.us for Native Sovereign Nations (which may also use -nsn.gov)
  - Example: www.mohegan.nsn.us (Mohegan Tribe)
- dni.us for distributed national institutes
  - Example: ccj.ncsc.dni.us (formerly the Conference of Chief Justices, part of the National Center for State Courts)
  - Example: www.theta-delta-chi.dni.us (formerly the Theta Delta Chi fraternity)

=== Locality domains ===
A large number of third-level domains are reserved for localities within states. Each fourth-level domain registration under this namespace follows the format organization-name.locality.state.us, where state is a state's two-letter postal abbreviation and locality is a hyphenated name that corresponds to a ZIP code or appears in a well-known atlas.

Two values of organization-name are formally reserved across the entire locality namespace for city and county governments:

- ci.locality.state.us for city governments
  - Example: www.ci.east-palo-alto.ca.us (East Palo Alto, California), ci.mansfield.oh.us (Mansfield, Ohio)
- co.locality.state.us for county governments
  - Example: www.co.adams.id.us (Adams County, Idaho)

Delegated managers often reserve additional names for different kinds of local governments:

- borough.locality.state.us for borough governments
  - Example: borough.shippensburg.pa.us (Shippensburg, Pennsylvania)
- city.locality.state.us for city governments
  - Example: www.city.waltham.ma.us (Waltham, Massachusetts)
- county.locality.state.us for county governments
- parish.locality.state.us for parish governments (unused)
- town.locality.state.us for town governments
  - Example: www.town.northlake.tx.us (Northlake, Texas), www.town.windermere.fl.us (Windermere, Florida)
- twp.locality.state.us or township.locality.state.us for township governments
  - Examples: twp.jerusalem.oh.us (Jerusalem Township, Lucas County, Ohio), www.township.wilson.mn.us (Wilson Township, Winona County, Minnesota), twp.greene.franklin.pa.us (Greene Township, Franklin County, Pennsylvania)
- vil.locality.state.us or village.locality.state.us for village governments
  - Examples: www.vil.bellwood.il.us (Bellwood, Illinois), www.village.fairport.ny.us (Fairport, New York)

In some cases, a local government that serves as the delegated manager for its own locality may locate its website directly under the locality, omitting the organization-name. For example, the website of the City of Brunswick, Ohio, is located at www.brunswick.oh.us rather than www.ci.brunswick.oh.us, and the website of Delhi Township, Ohio, is located at www.delhi.oh.us instead of www.twp.delhi.oh.us. Unusually, Lima, Ohio, is located at www.cityhall.lima.oh.us.

Many large cities use .gov extensions, for example Chicago (www.chicago.gov); Rochester, New York and (www.cityofrochester.gov). Several cities, villages, and towns use the localitystate.gov format, often with the state abbreviated, for example, Atlanta, Georgia (www.atlantaga.gov), Northport, New York (www.northportny.gov), and Huntington, New York (www.huntingtonny.gov). Although most New York City websites have moved to www.nyc.gov, us redirects exist for individual city agencies, such as the Independent Budget Office at www.ibo.nyc.ny.us and the Board of Elections at vote.nyc.ny.us.

Private organizations and individuals may register fourth-level domains parallel to these government domains, for example:

- bcn.boulder.co.us (a community network in Boulder, Colorado)
- hpnc.cincinnati.oh.us (the neighborhood council for Hyde Park, Cincinnati)
- linux.portland.or.us (Portland Linux/Unix Group)
- michael.silverton.palo-alto.ca.us (Michael Silverton, a resident of Palo Alto, California)
- owen.sj.ca.us or owen.san-jose.ca.us (a family in San Jose, California)
- www.sna.providence.ri.us (the neighborhood association for Hope, Providence, Rhode Island)
- social.seattle.wa.us (a Mastodon instance in Seattle)
- social.tulsa.ok.us (a Mastodon instance in Tulsa, Oklahoma)
- wclug.chicago.il.us (a Linux user group in Chicago)
- well.sf.ca.us (The WELL, a virtual community in San Francisco)

The us TLD registrar serves as the default delegated manager for all undelegated third-level locality domains, as well as any locality domains relinquished by delegated managers. Under Neustar and GoDaddy, the registrar has discontinued delegation of third-level locality domains, as well as registration of domain names under any locality or affinity domain for which it serves as the delegated manager.

==== Alternative locality names ====
Some delegated managers alternatively register domains under common abbreviations of locality names, which are not necessarily interchangeable. Many of these abbreviations came from Western Union's "City Mnemonics" list. Examples include:

Canonical domain	Alternative domain	Locality
albuquerque.nm.us	abq.nm.us	Albuquerque, New Mexico
atlanta.ga.us	atl.ga.us	Atlanta
bethlehem.pa.us	betm.pa.us	Bethlehem, Pennsylvania
boca-raton.fl.us	bcr.fl.us	Boca Raton, Florida
boynton-beach.fl.us	boynton-bch.fl.us	Boynton Beach, Florida
charlottesville.va.us	chv.va.us	Charlottesville, Virginia
charlottesville.va.us	cvl.va.us	Charlottesville, Virginia
chattanooga.tn.us	cta.tn.us	Chattanooga, Tennessee
chicago.il.us	chi.il.us	Chicago
city-of-commerce.ca.us	commerce.ca.us	Commerce, California
colorado-springs.co.us	colospgs.co.us	Colorado Springs, Colorado
fayetteville.nc.us	fay.nc.us	Fayetteville, North Carolina
fort-lauderdale.fl.us	ft-lauderdale.fl.us	Fort Lauderdale, Florida
fort-lauderdale.fl.us	ftl.fl.us	Fort Lauderdale, Florida
fort-lauderdale.fl.us	ftlaud.fl.us	Fort Lauderdale, Florida
fort-walton-beach.fl.us	fwb.fl.us	Fort Walton Beach, Florida
gainesville.fl.us	gnv.fl.us	Gainesville, Florida
haverford.pa.us	hvfd.pa.us	Haverford, Pennsylvania
honolulu.hi.us	hnl.hi.us	Honolulu
houston.tx.us	hou.tx.us	Houston
jacksonville.fl.us	jax.fl.us	Jacksonville, Florida
jersey-city.nj.us	jcty.nj.us	Jersey City, New Jersey
knoxville.tn.us	knox.tn.us	Knoxville, Tennessee
lafayette.in.us	laf.in.us	Lafayette, Indiana
laguna-niguel.ca.us	lanu.ca.us	Laguna Niguel, California
lexington.ky.us	lex.ky.us	Lexington, Kentucky
little-rock.ar.us	lrk.ar.us	Little Rock, Arkansas
livermore.ca.us	lvmr.ca.us	Livermore, California
long-beach.ca.us	lgb.ca.us	Long Beach, California
los-angeles.ca.us	la.ca.us	Los Angeles
los-angeles.ca.us	la.ca.us	Los Angeles County, California
louisville.ky.us	lou.ky.us	Louisville, Kentucky
menlo-park.ca.us	mpk.ca.us	Menlo Park, California
milwaukee.wi.us	mil.wi.us	Milwaukee
minneapolis.mn.us	mpls.mn.us	Minneapolis
mission-viejo.ca.us	mivj.ca.us	Mission Viejo, California
missouri-city.tx.us	mocity.tx.us	Missouri City, Texas
mountain-view.ca.us	mtnview.ca.us	Mountain View, California
mountain-view.ca.us	mtview.ca.us	Mountain View, California
mountlake-terrace.wa.us	mlt.wa.us	Mountlake Terrace, Washington
munroe-falls.oh.us	mrfs.oh.us	Munroe Falls, Ohio
murfreesboro.tn.us	mfee.tn.us	Murfreesboro, Tennessee
nashville.tn.us	nashvl.tn.us	Nashville, Tennessee
new-york.ny.us	nyc.ny.us	New York City
norwalk.ca.us	nrwk.ca.us	Norwalk, California
oak-ridge.tn.us	or.tn.us	Oak Ridge, Tennessee
orland-park.il.us	orpk.il.us	Orland Park, Illinois
pacific-grove.ca.us	pg.ca.us	Pacific Grove, California
palm-beach-gardens.fl.us	pbg.fl.us	Palm Beach Gardens, Florida
palo-alto.ca.us	pla.ca.us	Palo Alto, California
philadelphia.pa.us	pha.pa.us	Philadelphia
philadelphia.pa.us	phl.pa.us	Philadelphia
pittsburgh.pa.us	pgh.pa.us	Pittsburgh
pleasanton.ca.us	plsn.ca.us	Pleasanton, California
portola-valley.ca.us	portola.ca.us	Portola Valley, California
portola-valley.ca.us	ptvy.ca.us	Portola Valley, California
prince-georges.md.us	pg.md.us	Prince George's County, Maryland
rancho-cucamonga.ca.us	cucamonga.ca.us	Rancho Cucamonga, California
redondo-beach.ca.us	rb.ca.us	Redondo Beach, California
redwood-city.ca.us	rwc.ca.us	Redwood City, California
rochester.ny.us	roc.ny.us	Rochester, New York
sacramento.ca.us	sac.ca.us	Sacramento, California
sacramento.ca.us	sac.ca.us	Sacramento County, California
saint-petersburg.fl.us	st-pete.fl.us	St. Petersburg, Florida
salt-lake.ut.us	slc.ut.us	Salt Lake County, Utah
salt-lake-city.ut.us	salt-lake.ut.us	Salt Lake City
salt-lake-city.ut.us	slc.ut.us	Salt Lake City
san-antonio.tx.us	sat.tx.us	San Antonio
san-francisco.ca.us	sf.ca.us	San Francisco
san-luis-obisbo.ca.us	slo.ca.us	San Luis Obispo, California
san-luis-obisbo.ca.us	slo.ca.us	San Luis Obispo County, California
san-jose.ca.us	sj.ca.us	San Jose, California
santa-clara.ca.us	scl.ca.us	Santa Clara, California
santa-clara.ca.us	scl.ca.us	Santa Clara County, California
sausalito.ca.us	sau.ca.us	Sausalito, California
seattle.wa.us	sea.wa.us	Seattle
shaker-heights.oh.us	shaker-hts.oh.us	Shaker Heights, Ohio
somerville.ma.us	svle.ma.us	Somerville, Massachusetts
south-san-francisco.ca.us	ssf.ca.us	South San Francisco, California
state-college.pa.us	scol.pa.us	State College, Pennsylvania
steamboat-springs.co.us	steamboat.co.us	Steamboat Springs, Colorado
sunnyvale.ca.us	suvl.ca.us	Sunnyvale, California
vancouver.wa.us	van.wa.us	Vancouver, Washington
villa-park.ca.us	vlpa.ca.us	Villa Park, California
west-palm-beach.fl.us	wpb.fl.us	West Palm Beach, Florida
wichita-falls.tx.us	wf.tx.us	Wichita Falls, Texas
yellow-springs.oh.us	ys.oh.us	Yellow Springs, Ohio

=== Affinity namespaces ===
Directly beneath the state.us zone, several affinity namespaces are reserved for specific purposes:

- state: state government agencies (organization-name.state.state.us)
  - Examples: arkleg.state.ar.us (Arkansas General Assembly), mdhhsmiimmsportal.state.mi.us (Michigan Department of Health and Human Services immunization records portal), tap.state.nm.us (New Mexico Taxation and Revenue Department tax filing system)
- dst: government agencies in administrative districts (organization-name.dst.state.us)
  - Example: lnva.dst.tx.us (Lower Neches Valley Authority)
- cog: councils of governments, that is, federations of cities or counties (organization-name.cog.state.us)
  - Example: stdc.cog.tx.us (South Texas Development Council)
- k12: public elementary and/or secondary unified school districts (district-name.k12.state.us) individual schools (school-name.k12.state.us). Also used by public agencies overseeing educational institutions.
  - Examples: iberia.k12.la.us (Iberia Parish School District), www.pctc.k12.oh.us (Pioneer Career and Technology Center), ospi.k12.wa.us (Washington State Office of Superintendent of Public Instruction)
  - pvt.k12: private elementary or secondary schools (school-name.pvt.k12.state.us or school-name.diocese-name.pvt.k12.state.us)
    - Examples: www.ionaprep.pvt.k12.ny.us (Iona Preparatory School), www.stmary-wooster.cld.pvt.k12.oh.us (a private K-12 school in the Roman Catholic Diocese of Cleveland in Ohio)
  - The k12.ma.us delegate manager additionally delegates domains under chtr.k12.ma.us and paroch.k12.ma.us for charter schools and parochial schools, respectively.
- cc: community colleges (school-name.cc.state.us)
  - Example: www.lakeland.cc.il.us (Lake Land College)
- tec: technical and vocational schools (school-name.tec.state.us)
  - Example: ap.tec.pa.us (Admiral Peary Vocational-Technical School)
- lib: public libraries (library-name.lib.state.us)
  - Example: www.monroecounty.lib.oh.us (Monroe County District Library)
- mus: museums (museum-name.mus.state.us)
  - Example: www.ok-history.mus.ok.us (Oklahoma Historical Society)
- gen: general independent entities (clubs or other groups not fitting into the above categories) (organization-name.gen.state.us)
  - Examples: www.mrc.gen.mn.us (a amateur radio association in Minnesota), luni.gen.il.us (a Linux user group for northern Illinois), squaredance.gen.or.us (a statewide federation of square dance clubs)

Some of these affinity namespaces have been supplanted by more convenient sponsored top-level domains. The first sTLD, .museum, became available in October 2001 as an alternative to the .mus namespace. Since April 2003, the .edu top-level domain has been available as an alternative for community colleges, technical and vocational schools, and other tertiary educational institutions that might have previously used the .cc or .tec affinity namespaces.

Although the Kentucky Department of Education operates the .k12.ky.us namespace for Kentucky school districts, most districts instead use subdomains of the less formal domain kyschools.us, which the department operates in a similar manner. For example, Gallatin county schools have a website at www.gallatin.k12.ky.us, while Paducah Public Schools are located at paducah.kyschools.us and the McCracken County Public Schools use mccracken.kyschools.us as a redirect to www.mccrackencountyschools.net.

== Kids.us ==
The Dot Kids Implementation and Efficiency Act of 2002 (Pub. L. 107–317 (text) (PDF)) established a .kids.us second-level domain. The general public could register third-level domains under .kids.us for educational content that met strict requirements, including conformance to the Children's Online Privacy Protection Act and adherence to Children's Advertising Review Unit standards. Webpages were prohibited from linking outside the .kids.us namespace. On July 27, 2012, in response to declining usage and a petition by Neustar the previous year, the NTIA suspended .kids.us registrations. By that time, 651 domains were registered under .kids.us, and only five registrants (Nickelodeon, Nick Jr., PBS Kids, the Smithsonian Center for Education and Museum Studies, and Super-Fun Sports Inc., operating trampoline.kids.us and trampolines.kids.us) were operating active websites.

== Restrictions on use ==
Under us nexus requirements, us domains may be registered only by the following qualified entities:

- Any United States citizen or resident,
- Any United States entity, such as organizations or corporations,
- Any foreign entity or organization with a bona fide presence in the United States

To ensure that these requirements are met, GoDaddy frequently conducts "spot checks" on registrant information.

To prevent anonymous registrations that do not meet these requirements, in 2005 the National Telecommunications and Information Administration ruled that registrants of us domains may not secure private domain name registration via anonymizing proxies, and that their contact information must be made public. Registrants are required to provide complete contact information without omissions.

Under the locality namespace, delegated managers may impose additional requirements. For example, the former Texas Regional Hostmaster restricted each of its delegated localities to organizations that had a mailing address in that locality.

== Other top-level domains related to the United States ==
Some sponsored top-level domains (sTLDs) are restricted to U.S.-based entities, other than some grandfathered registrations. These domains are much more popular than the equivalent domains under us.

sTLD	Allowed use	us alternative
edu	Community colleges	cc.state.us
edu	Technical and vocational schools	tec.state.us
gov	Federal government agencies	fed.us
gov	Tribal governments	tribe.nsn.us
gov	State governments	state.state.us
gov	Local governments	type.locality.state.us
mil	Armed forces	—N/a

Territories of the United States use their own country code top-level domains (ccTLDs). Identical domains are reserved under us but in practice go unused.

ccTLD	Territory	us alternative
as	American Samoa	as.us
gu	Guam	gu.us
mp	Northern Mariana Islands	mp.us
pr	Puerto Rico	pr.us
um (deprecated)	United States Minor Outlying Islands	um.us
vi	United States Virgin Islands	vi.us

Some U.S. cities are the focus of generic top-level domains under the New gTLD Program. These gTLDs are not necessarily affiliated with the delegated managers of the corresponding third-level domains within the us locality namespace.

gTLD	City	us alternative
boston	Boston	boston.ma.us
miami	Miami	miami.fl.us
nyc	New York City	new-york.ny.us
nyc	New York City	nyc.ny.us
vegas	Las Vegas	las-vegas.nv.us

Unofficially, some ccTLDs belonging to other countries are used by U.S.-based private organizations and state government agencies based on their similarity to postal state abbreviations or informal city name abbreviations.

ccTLD	Intended for	Informal use	us alternative
la	Laos	Louisiana	la.us
la	Laos	Los Angeles	la.ca.us
la	Laos	Los Angeles	los-angeles.ca.us
mn	Mongolia	Minnesota	mn.us
ms	Montserrat	Mississippi	ms.us

== See also ==
- Internet in the United States
- List of Internet top-level domains § North America
