= Internet in the United States =

The Internet in the United States grew out of the ARPANET, a network sponsored by the Advanced Research Projects Agency of the U.S. Department of Defense during the 1960s. The Internet in the United States of America in turn provided the foundation for the worldwide Internet of today.

Internet connections in the United States are largely provided by the private sector and are available in a variety of forms, using a variety of technologies, at a wide range of speeds and costs. In 2001, half of U.S. households had internet access. In September 2007, a majority of U.S. survey respondents reported having broadband internet at home. In 2019, the United States ranked 3rd in the world for the number of internet users (behind China and India), with 312.32 million users. As of 2024, 96% of adults in America use the internet. The United States ranks #1 in the world with 7,000 Internet service providers (ISPs) according to the CIA. Internet bandwidth per Internet user was the 43rd highest in the world in 2016.

Internet top-level domain names specific to the U.S. include .us, .edu, .gov, .mil, .as (American Samoa), .gu (Guam), .mp (Northern Mariana Islands), .pr (Puerto Rico), and .vi (U.S. Virgin Islands). Many U.S.-based organizations and individuals also use generic top-level domains, such as .com, .net, and .org.

== Overview ==
=== Access and speed ===
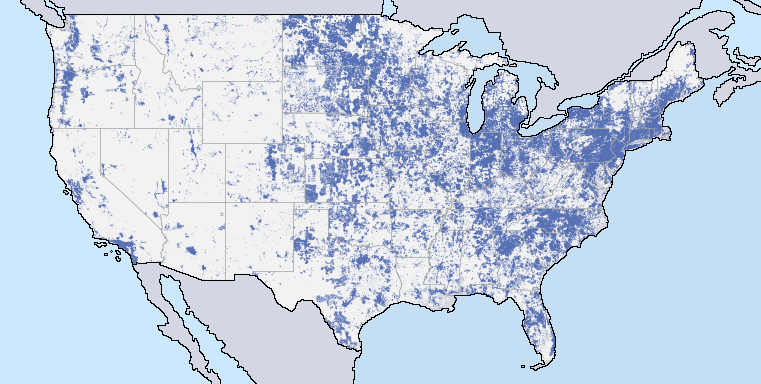
Wireline broadband availability showing locations where the maximum advertised download speed is 3 Mbit/s or more (December 2012). In 2019, Microsoft criticized the FCC for relying on ISPs to self-report availability, and said internal usage data indicated the FCC maps overstate actual availability.

Access to the Internet can be divided into dial-up and broadband access. Around the start of the 21st century, most residential access was by dial-up, while access from businesses was usually by higher speed connections. In subsequent years dial-up declined in favor of broadband access. Both types of access generally use a modem, which converts digital data to analog for transmission over a particular analog network (ex. the telephone or cable networks).

Dial-up access is a connection to the Internet through a phone line, creating a semi-permanent link to the Internet. Operating on a single channel, it monopolizes the phone line and is the slowest method of accessing the Internet. Dial-up is often the only form of Internet access available in rural areas because it requires no infrastructure other than the already existing telephone network. Dial-up connections typically do not exceed a speed of 56 kbit/s, because they are primarily made via a 56k modem.

Broadband access includes a wide range of speeds and technologies, all of which provide much faster access to the Internet than dial-up. The term "broadband" once had a technical meaning, but today it is more often used as a marketing buzzword to simply mean "faster". Broadband connections are continuous or "always on" connections, without the need to dial and hangup, and do not monopolize phone lines. Common types of broadband access include DSL (digital subscriber lines), which uses a telephone line, cable Internet access, satellite Internet access, and mobile or wireless broadband, via cell phones or a mobile broadband modem, through a cellular or wireless network, and from a cell tower. In 2015, the United States Federal Communications Commission (FCC) defined broadband as any connection with a download speed of at least 25 Mbit/s and an upload speed of at least 3 Mbit/s, though the definition has used a slower speed in the past. In March 2024, the FCC increased the minimums to 100 Mbit/s downloads and 20 Mbit/s uploads for defining broadband.

The percentage of the U.S. population using the Internet grew steadily through 2007, and declined slightly in 2008 and 2009. Growth resumed in 2010, and reached its highest level so far (81.0%) in 2012, the latest year for which data is available. 81.0% is slightly above the 2012 figure of 73% for all developed countries. Based on these figures the U.S. ranked 12th out of 206 countries in 2000, fell to 31st out of 209 by 2010, and was back up slightly to 28th out of 211 in 2012. In 2012 the U.S. figure of 81.0% was similar to those of France (83.0%), Belgium (82.0%), Australia (82.3%), Austria (81.0%), Slovakia (80%), Kuwait (79.2%), and Japan (79.1%). The figures for the top ten countries in 2012 ranged from 91.0% for Finland to 96.9% for the Falkland Islands. In rural areas of the country, broadband internet adoption rates grew from 3.8% in 2001 to 51% in 2009.

Internet usage in the United States varies widely from state to state. For example, in the U.S. overall in 2011, 77.9% of the population used the Internet. But in that same year (2011), there was a large gap in usage between the top three states - Washington (80.0%), New Hampshire (79.8%) and Minnesota (79.0%) - and the bottom three states - Mississippi (59.0%), New Mexico (60.4%) and Arkansas (61.4%).

According to an April 2018 article in Motherboard, "In every single state, a portion of the population doesn't have access to broadband, and some have no access to the internet at all."

Internet use in the United States 2000 to 2015 as a percentage of population
	Internet users		Fixed broadband subscriptions		Wireless broadband subscriptions	
Year	% of population	World rank	% of population	World rank	% of population	OECD rank
2015	75%					
2014	73%					
2013	72%					
2012	75%		28.0%	24 of 193	89.8%	6 of 34
2011	70%		27.4%	25 of 194	77.1%	7 of 34
2010	72%		26.7%	27 of 205	61.1%	8 of 34
2009	71%		25.5%	26 of 201	46.9%	7 of 30
2008	74%		24.8%	23 of 197		
2007	75%		23.2%	20 of 190		
2006	69%	17 of 206	20.1%	22 of 174		
2005	68%	15 of 206	17.2%	18 of 174		
2004	65%	14 of 204	12.7%	18 of 151		
2003	62%	12 of 202	9.5%	17 of 131		
2002	59%	13 of 207	6.9%	13 of 109		
2001	49%	12 of 207	4.5%	9 of 81		
2000	43%	12 of 206	2.5%	5 of 45		

Fixed (wired) and wireless broadband penetration have grown steadily, reaching peaks of 28.0% and 89.8% respectively in 2012. These rates place the U.S. above the world average of 25.9% for fixed broadband in developed countries and well above the average of 62.8% for wireless broadband in OECD countries. Wireless broadband subscriptions in the U.S. are primarily mobile-cellular broadband. Because a single Internet subscription may be shared by many people and a single person may have more than one subscription, the penetration rate will not reflect the actual level of access to broadband Internet of the population and penetration rates larger than 100% are possible.

A 2013 Pew study on home broadband adoption found that 70% of consumers have a high-speed broadband connection. About a third of consumers reported a "wireless" high-speed connection,^{[8]} but the report authors suspect that many of these consumers have mistakenly reported wireless connections to a wired DSL or cable connection.^{[9]} Another Pew Research Center survey, results of which were published on February 27, 2014, revealed 68% of American adults connect to the Internet with mobile devices like smartphones or tablet computers. The report also put Internet usage by American adults as high as 87%, while young adults aged between 18 and 29 were at 97%.

In measurements made between April and June 2013 (Q2), the United States ranked 8th out of 55 countries with an average connection speed of 8.7 Mbit/s. This represents an increase from 14th out of 49 countries and 5.3 Mbit/s for January to March 2011 (Q1). The global average for Q2 2013 was 3.3 Mbit/s, up from 2.1 Mbit/s for Q1 2011. In Q2 2013 South Korea ranked first at 13.3 Mbit/s, followed by Japan at 12.0 Mbit/s, and Switzerland at 11.0 Mbit/s.

=== Ownership ===
Unlike in countries such as China, Japan and New Zealand, internet infrastructure such as fiber optic cables, 4G LTE, 5G base stations, DSL (Digital Subscriber Line) and satellite networks in the United States are owned by private ISP's as opposed to the state, this in conjunction with high concentration of market share among four major players: AT&T (41.4%), Comcast (36.1%), Charter (33.4%) and Verizon (17.4%) as of 2021 allows for the creation of local monopolies whereby providers have little incentive to compete with each other or enter other providers' "territory" in order to fix prices and maintain market share.

Since ownership of underlying infrastructure is decentralised and privatised, the construction of internet infrastructure is also fragmented and driven by profit instead of public need. Given this, government attempts at funding roll out of infrastructure in rural and under-served areas where no financial incentive exists to for private companies to build any remains slow and costly, since the US government is forced to subsidise private ISP's to construct fibre optic cable networks and other key infrastructure.

As of 2022, a study by the Fibre Broadband Association estimated that only 43% of US households had access to fibre optic connections with "Tier 1" providers such as AT&T, Verizon, Lumen five others building 72% of fiber coverage in the United States. FCC data as of 2019 indicated that some 21.3 million Americans lacked access to fixed broadband with speeds of at 25 Mbit/s down and 3 Mbit/s up. Attempts by the US government to roll out or upgrade key internet infrastructure in any uniform or integrated way remain strongly influenced by corporate interests, lobbying at both the state and federal level and objections to what is perceived as government intervention in free market dynamics.

Just like Standard Oil, they’ve [Verizon and others] cornered the market on a commodity that's essential for every part of American society to operate. High-speed Internet access undergirds every policy direction the country wants to take. And yet, control over this commodity is centralized in the hands of a very few providers. — Susan Crawford, (Former Special Assistant to President Obama for Science, Technology, and Innovation Policy)

=== Competition ===
A lack of competition and consumer choice in the broadband provider market has been cited as the primary reason Internet costs can be high and speeds and access can be poor even in urban areas. In the DSL market, the Telecommunications Act of 1996 required incumbent local exchange carriers to lease lines to consumers to competitive local exchange carriers, but changes to FCC regulations in 2005 significantly weakened these requirements. In the cable broadband market, the 1996 law also allowed cable companies to consolidate, resulting in a small number of large companies, which agreed to give each one a monopoly in a certain geographic area.

Lack of competition has also been attributed to past stringent regulation from federal, state, and local levels, which raises barriers to entry. Specifically, such criticism has referenced limitations regarding access to and development of the physical infrastructure necessary to broadband, including right-of-way to land and ownership of utility poles. The Rural Broadband Association, an organization representing rural-centric providers, has pointed to the expensive permits and procedural delays in preventing "universal" broadband access. For rural areas such as the ones the RBA represents, financial returns can be insufficient and thus private actors have little incentive to compete over another in establishing relevant facilities. This problem is particularly salient for indigenous parts of the U.S., where tribal lands "have some of the lowest internet access rates of any demographic". Policy goals of equity, not profit, have been driving the few access projects targeted towards these communities as a result of unrewarding demand. In other circumstances, where demand is high enough to propel investment, the fixed costs associated with building broadband infrastructure are high enough to deter even the larger providers. Sprint claims it spent "tens of millions of dollars" in their checking for compliance with NEPA, a set of environmental impact regulations, that found "no significant impact" by the conclusion and ultimately delayed their entrance in that particular geography.

To remedy this anti-competitive climate, governments have worked to minimize costs entrants may incur. The Telecommunications Act of 1996 expanded access rights to pole attachments for ISPs with federal subsidies in an aim to encourage provider participation. In 2015, the Federal Communications Commission granted a preemption petition requested by local utility boards in North Carolina and Tennessee over the state laws that, as a result of private provider lobbying, had legally prevented municipalities from entering the broadband market. To reduce costs and expand the market, the FCC has also approved a "Dig Once" policy—a mandate that requires cities to implement broadband conduits during construction of federally-funded roads. Because the financial price of laying down fiber constitutes such a large portion of deployment costs, measures sympathetic towards this step of entrance make it easier for more actors to invest.

A number of counties have also issued ordinances or grants that waive or offset certain fees associated with building infrastructure in order to encourage broadband building projects.

Outside of regulatory and legislative action, states have at their disposal informal policies that offer other incentives for investment, such as collecting and providing local data to streamline deployment action or communication efforts.

=== Internet taxes ===
In 1998, the federal Internet Tax Freedom Act halted the expansion of direct taxation of the Internet that had begun in several states in the mid-1990s. The law, however, did not affect sales taxes applied to online purchases which continue to be taxed at varying rates depending on the jurisdiction, in the same way that phone and mail orders are taxed.

The absence of direct taxation of the Internet does not mean that all transactions taking place online are free of tax, or even that the Internet is free of all tax. In fact, nearly all online transactions are subject to one form of tax or another. The Internet Tax Freedom Act merely prevents states from imposing their sales tax, or any other kind of gross receipts tax, on certain online services. For example, a state may impose an income or franchise tax on the net income earned by the provider of online services, while the same state would be precluded from imposing its sales tax on the gross receipts of that provider.

=== Network neutrality ===
In the United States, net neutrality, the principle that Internet service providers (ISPs) treat all data on the Internet the same, and not discriminate, has been an issue of contention between network users and access providers since the 1990s. To elucidate the term "net neutrality", one can apply a metaphor that was given and illustrated by Michael Goodwin: In his illustration, he illustrates ISPs as the driveway that connects a home to the vast network of destinations on the internet, and net neutrality is the principle that prevents ISPs from slowing some traffic or charging a premium fee for other traffic.

On August 5, 2005, the FCC reclassified some services as information services rather than telecommunications services, and replaced common carrier requirements on them with a set of four less-restrictive net neutrality principles. These principles, however, are not FCC rules, and therefore not enforceable requirements. Actually implementing the principles requires either official FCC rule-making or federal legislation.

On June 6, 2010, the United States Court of Appeal for the District of Columbia in Comcast Corp. v. FCC ruled that the FCC lacks the authority as an information service, under the ancillary statutory authority of Title One of the Communications Act of 1934, to force Internet service providers to keep their networks open, while employing reasonable network management practices, to all forms of legal content. On December 21, 2010, the FCC approved the FCC Open Internet Order banning cable television and telephone service providers from preventing access to competitors or certain web sites such as Netflix. The rules would not keep ISPs from charging more for faster access.

On February 26, 2015, the FCC's Open Internet rules went into effect when the FCC designated the Internet as a telecommunications tool and applied to it new "rules of the road".

"[Open Internet Rules are] designed to protect free expression and innovation on the Internet and promote investment in the nation's broadband networks. The Open Internet rules are grounded in the strongest possible legal foundation by relying on multiple sources of authority, including: Title II of the Communications Act and Section 706 of the Telecommunications Act of 1996. As part of this decision, the Commission also refrains (or "forbears") from enforcing provisions of Title II that are not relevant to modern broadband service. Together Title II and Section 706 support clear rules of the road, providing the certainty needed for innovators and investors, and the competitive choices and freedom demanded by consumers.

The new rules apply to both fixed and mobile broadband service. This approach recognizes advances in technology and the growing significance of mobile broadband Internet access in recent years. These rules will protect consumers no matter how they access the Internet, whether on a desktop computer or a mobile device."

In summary the new rules are as follows:

- No blocking: broadband providers may not block access to legal content, applications, services, or non-harmful devices.
- No throttling: broadband providers may not impair or degrade lawful Internet traffic on the basis of content, applications, services, or non-harmful devices.
- No paid prioritization: broadband providers may not favor some lawful Internet traffic over other lawful traffic in exchange for consideration of any kind—in other words, no "fast lanes." This rule also bans ISPs from prioritizing content and services of their affiliates.

On December 14, 2017, the FCC voted to reverse the 2015 Title II classifications of ISPs, and the classifications fell out of use on June 11, 2018.

=== Internet censorship ===
The strong protections for freedom of speech and expression against federal, state, and local government censorship are rooted in the First Amendment to the United States Constitution. These protections extend to the Internet and as a result very little government mandated technical filtering occurs in the U.S. Nevertheless, the Internet in the United States is highly regulated, supported by a complex set of legally binding and privately mediated mechanisms.

After a decade and half of ongoing contentious debate over content regulation, the country is still far from reaching political consensus on the acceptable limits of free speech and the best means of protecting minors and policing illegal activity on the Internet. Gambling, cyber security, and dangers to children who frequent social networking sites—real and perceived—are important ongoing debates. Significant public resistance to proposed content restriction policies have prevented the more extreme measures used in some other countries from taking hold in the U.S.

Public dialogue, legislative debate, and judicial review have produced filtering strategies in the United States that are different from those found in most of the rest of the world. Many government-mandated attempts to regulate content have been barred on First Amendment grounds, often after lengthy legal battles. However, the government has been able to exert pressure indirectly where it cannot directly censor. With the exception of child pornography, content restrictions tend to rely more on the removal of content than blocking; most often these controls rely upon the involvement of private parties, backed by state encouragement or the threat of legal action. In contrast to much of the rest of the world, where ISPs are subject to state mandates, most content regulation in the United States occurs at the private or voluntary level.

== Broadband providers ==
The broadband Internet access providers in the United States with more than one million subscribers as of Q1 2024 were:

Mbit/s: Megabit per second

Gbit/s: Gigabit per second (1 Gbit/s = 1000 Mbit/s)

Provider	Subscriptions	Services
Xfinity	32,253,000	Cable Internet access at speeds up to 2 Gbit/s and Gigabit Pro Fiber in select areas with speeds up to 10 Gbit/s.
Charter Spectrum	30,588,000	Cable Internet access at minimum speeds of 100 Mbit/s and up to 1 Gbit/s in most markets
AT&T	15,288,000	DSL access at speeds up to 18 Mbit/s, and FTTN VDSL2 access (AT&T Internet) at speeds up to 100 Mbit/s. Fiber access available at up to 5 Gbit/s
Verizon	10,717,000	DSL access at speeds of 0.5 to 15 Mbit/s, fiber access (FiOS) at speeds of 50 Mbit/s to 2 Gbit/s, and fixed wireless broadband with speeds up to 940 Mbit/s
Cox	5,552,000	Cable Internet access at speeds of 5 Mbit/s to 1 Gbit/s.
T-Mobile US	4,776,000	Wireless home broadband with speeds typically in 72 - 245 Mbit/s range.
Altice USA	4,517,900	Cable Internet access at speeds up to 1 Gbit/s. and fiber access at speeds up to 8 Gbit/s in select markets
Frontier	2,943,000	Fiber access with speeds up to 5 Gbit/s.
Lumen	2,758,000	Vectored & Bonded VDSL2+ speeds up to 140/10 Mbit/s and also offers Metro Ethernet & T1 Lines, Fiber speeds up to 8 Gbit/s for consumers and up to 100 Gbit/s for business Includes Centurylink and Quantum Fiber
Mediacom	1,468,000	Cable Internet access at speeds from 60 Mbit/s to 1 Gbit/s.
Windstream	1,175,000	DSL access at speeds from 3 to 12 Mbit/s. Also offers fiber, Metro Ethernet & T1 speeds, up to 1 Gbit/s.
Cable One	1,059,300	

In 2010, four of these companies ranked among the ten largest ISPs in the world in terms of subscribers: Comcast (4th), AT&T (5th), Time Warner (now Charter Spectrum) (7th), and Verizon (8th).

== Government policy and programs ==
With the advent of the World Wide Web, the commercialization of the Internet, and its spread beyond use within the government and the research and education communities in the 1990s, Internet access became an important public policy and political issue.

=== National Information Infrastructure ===
The High Performance Computing and Communication Act of 1991 (HPCA), Pub. L. 102–194, built on prior U.S. efforts toward developing a national networking infrastructure, starting with the ARPANET in the 1960s and the funding of the National Science Foundation Network (NSFnet) in the 1980s. It led to the development of the National Information Infrastructure and included funding for a series of projects under the titles National Research and Education Network (NREN) and High-Performance Computing and Communications Initiative which spurred many significant technological developments, such as the Mosaic web browser, and the creation of a high-speed fiber optic computer network. The HPCA provided the framework for the transition of the Internet from a largely government sponsored network to the commercial Internet that followed.

The National Science Foundation banned commercial ISPs, permitting only government agencies and universities to use the internet until 1989. "The World" materialized as the first commercial ISP. By 1991, the NSF lifted the ban and the commercial ISP business grew rapidly.

=== Universal Service Fund ===
Universal service is a program dating back to early in the 20th century with a goal to encourage/require the interconnection of telephone networks operated by different providers. Over time this grew into the more general goal of providing telephone service to everyone in the United States at a reasonable price. When Congress passed the Telecommunications Act of 1996 it provided for the creation of a Universal Service Fund to help meet the challenges and opportunities of the digital information age. The Universal Service Fund (USF) was established in 1997 by the Federal Communications Commission (FCC) to implement the goals of the Telecommunications Act.

The Telecommunications Act requires all telecommunications companies to make equitable and non-discriminatory contributions to the USF. Under the supervision of the FCC, the Universal Service Administrative Company (USAC), is responsible for allocating money from the central fund to four programs: High Cost, Low Income, Rural Health Care, and Schools and Libraries (E-rate). These programs are designed to:

- Promote the availability of quality services at just, reasonable, and affordable rates;
- Increase access to advanced telecommunications services throughout the Nation;
- Advance the availability of such services to all consumers, including those in low income, rural, insular, and high cost areas at rates that are reasonably comparable to those charged in urban areas;
- Increase access to telecommunications and advanced services in schools, libraries and rural health care facilities; and
- Provide equitable and non-discriminatory contributions from all providers of telecommunications services to the fund supporting universal service programs.

Telecommunications companies may, but are not required to, charge their customers a fee to recover the costs of contributing to the Universal Service fund. Consumers may see this reflected in a line-item charge labeled "Universal Service" on telecommunications bills. The amount of this charge, if any, and the method used to collect the fee from consumers is determined by the companies and is not mandated by the FCC.

In October 2011 the FCC voted to phase out the USF's high-cost program that has been subsidizing voice telephone services in rural areas by shifting $4.5 billion a year in funding over several years to a new Connect America Fund focused on expanding broadband deployment.

==== Schools and Libraries Program (E-Rate) ====
More formally known as the Schools and Libraries Program, the E-Rate is funded from the Universal Service Fund. The E-Rate provides discounts to K-12 schools and libraries in the United States to reduce the cost of installing and maintaining telecommunications services, Internet access, and internal connections. The discounts available range from 20% to 90% depending on the poverty level and urban/rural status of the communities where the schools and libraries are located.

There has been a good deal of controversy surrounding the E-Rate, including legal challenges from states and telecommunications companies. The impact of the program is hard to measure, but at the beginning of 2005 over 100,000 schools had participated in the program. Annual requests for discounts are roughly three times the $2.25 billion that is available, so while all eligible schools and libraries receive some discounts, some do not receive all of the discounts to which they are entitled under the rules of the program.

==== Rural Health Care Program ====
Seventy-eight percent of rural community members have internet access. Like the E-Rate, the Rural Health Care Program (RHC) is funded from the Universal Service Fund. It provides funding to eligible health care providers for telecommunications services, including broadband Internet access, necessary for the provision of health care. The goal of the program is to improve the quality of health care available to patients in rural communities by ensuring that eligible health care providers have access to affordable telecommunications services, most often to implement "tele-health and tele-medicine" services, typically a combination of video-conferencing infrastructure and high speed Internet access, to enable doctors and patients in rural hospitals to access specialists in distant cities.

Over $417 million has been allocated for the construction of 62 statewide or regional broadband telehealth networks in 42 states and three U.S. territories under the Rural Health Care Pilot Program.

The Healthcare Connect Fund (HCF) is a new component of the Rural Health Care Program. The HCF will provide a 65 percent discount on eligible expenses related to broadband Internet connectivity to both individual rural health care providers (HCPs) and consortia, which can include non-rural HCPs (if the consortium has a majority of rural sites). Applications under the new program will be accepted starting in late summer 2013 with funding beginning on January 1, 2014. Discounts for traditional telecommunications will continue to be available under the existing RHC Telecommunications Program.

=== Rural broadband and advanced telecommunications ===
The Rural Utilities Service of the U.S. Department of Agriculture oversees several programs designed to bring the benefits of broadband Internet access and advanced telecommunications services to under served areas in the U.S. and its territories:

- Farm Bill Broadband Loan Program: Provides loans for funding the costs, on a technology neutral basis, of construction, improvement, and acquisition of facilities and equipment to provide broadband service to eligible rural communities.
- Recovery Act Broadband Initiatives Program (BIP): A one-time program that is now closed, the BIP provided grants and loans to provide access to broadband services.
- Community Connect program: Provides grants to assist rural communities expand, construct, purchase, or lease facilities and services to deploy expanded broadband Internet access to all residential and business customers located within a service area and all participating critical community facilities, including funding for up to ten computer access points to be used in a community center.
- Distance Learning and Telemedicine Loan and Grant Program: Provides grants and loans to support acquisition of advanced telecommunications technologies, instructional programming, and technical assistance to provide enhanced learning and health care opportunities for rural residents.
- Telecommunications Infrastructure Loan Program: Provides long-term direct and guaranteed loans to qualified organizations for the purpose of financing the improvement, expansion, construction, acquisition, and operation of telephone lines, facilities, or systems to furnish and improve telecommunications service in rural areas. All facilities financed must be capable of supporting broadband services.

=== American Recovery and Reinvestment Act of 2009 ===
The 2009 Stimulus Bill, as it is commonly termed, was enacted by the 111th United States Congress and signed into law by President Barack Obama on February 17, 2009. The bill provides funding for broadband grant and loan programs:

- $4.7 billion to create the Broadband Technology Opportunities Program within the National Telecommunications and Information Administration (NTIA) of the Department of Commerce to bring broadband to unserved and under-served areas and to facilitate broadband use and adoption.
- $2.5 billion to be distributed by the Department of Agriculture to help bring broadband to rural areas.
- Required the Federal Communications Commission (FCC) to develop a national broadband plan within one year.

==== National Broadband Plan ====
Internet access has become a vital tool in development and social progress since the start of the 21st century. As a result, Internet penetration and, more specifically, broadband Internet penetration rates are now treated as key economic indicators. The United States is widely perceived as falling behind in both its rate of broadband Internet penetration and the speed of its broadband infrastructure.

For all of these reasons, there were calls for the U.S. to develop, adopt, fund, and implement a National Broadband Plan, which the Federal Communications Commission (FCC) did in March 2010, after first soliciting public comments from April 2009 through February 2010. The goals of the plan as described on Broadband.gov are:

1. At least 100 million U.S. homes should have affordable access to actual download speeds of at least 100 megabits per second and actual upload speeds of at least 50 megabits per second by the year 2020.
2. The United States should lead the world in mobile innovation, with the fastest and most extensive wireless networks of any nation.
3. Every American should have affordable access to robust broadband service, and the means and skills to subscribe if they so choose.
4. Every American community should have affordable access to at least one gigabit per second broadband service to anchor institutions such as schools, hospitals, and government buildings.
5. To ensure the safety of the American people, every first responder should have access to a nationwide, wireless, interoperable broadband public safety network.
6. To ensure that America leads in the clean energy economy, every American should be able to use broadband to track and manage their real-time energy consumption.

In January 2025, the North American Fiber Deployment Report stated that a total of 88.1 million homes has passed with fiber in the United States, which accounts for 56.5 of US households.

=== Emergency subsidies ===
The COVID-19 pandemic in the United States created an urgent need for many households to be connected to the Internet in order to continue work, school, or health care. The American Rescue Plan Act of 2021 allocated $3.2 billion to subsidize broadband access for low-income households. The FCC approved a program of $50 monthly payments for service, plus up to $100 to purchase equipment.

== See also ==
- Satellite Internet access
- Broadband mapping in the United States
- Communications Assistance for Law Enforcement Act (CALEA)
- Communications in the United States
- Affordable Connectivity Program
- Internet in American Samoa
- Internet in Guam
- Internet in Puerto Rico
- Internet in the United States Virgin Islands
- Mass surveillance in the United States
  - Global surveillance disclosures (2013–present)
- Municipal broadband
- National broadband plans from around the world
- Internet Service Provider
