= .gu =

Internet country code top-level domain for Guam

- Introduced: April 15, 1994
- TLD type: Country code top-level domain
- Status: Active
- Registry: Guam Network Information Center
- Sponsor: University of Guam
- Intended use: Entities connected with Guam
- Actual use: Not very heavily used
- Registration restrictions: Must have a contact in Guam
- Structure: Registrations are accepted only at the third level beneath various second-level labels
- Registry website: give.uog.edu/gu-domain-application-form/

.gu is the Internet country code top-level domain (ccTLD) for Guam.

Registrations are free of charge but are limited to people or companies with a contact in Guam, and are limited to third-level registrations beneath second-level names such as .com.gu. There has not been very much use of .gu addresses.

== Second level domains ==
There are five Second Level Domains:

- com.gu: Commercial Entities
- net.gu: Network Service Providers
- gov.gu: Government
- org.gu: Non-commercial Organizations
- edu.gu: Education

== See also ==
- Internet in Guam
- Internet in the United States
- .us
