= .mp =

Internet country-code top level domain for the Northern Mariana Islands

- Introduced: October 22, 1996
- TLD type: Country code top-level domain
- Status: Active as of January 2009
- Registry: Saipan DataCom, Inc.
- Sponsor: Saipan DataCom, Inc.
- Intended use: Entities connected with Northern Mariana Islands
- Actual use: Marketed as a domain for sites usable on mobile devices; sometimes used where MP stands for Member of Parliament
- Registration restrictions: No registration restrictions; purchased domains have no restrictions
- Structure: Registrations are directly at second level; there are a few sites related to the Northern Mariana Islands in third level domains under such second level names as .gov.mp and .org.mp
- Documents: Registration and Service Agreement; Cancellation and Transfer policy
- Dispute policies: UDRP Dispute Resolution Policy
- Registry website: get.mp

.mp is the Internet country code top-level domain (ccTLD) for Northern Mariana Islands. There are a few sites related to the Northern Mariana Islands in this domain (such as governmental sites under .gov.mp and a few sites in .org.mp and .co.mp). The get.mp site allows users to register and manage .mp domains. The .mp name comes from ISO 3166 which specifies MP as the two letter designation for the Northern Mariana Islands.

== Official registry site ==
Domain name registry services for .mp domains are operated by Saipan DataCom, a local ISP. Domains with four or more characters may be purchased for $20. Premium domains under four characters range in price, with two-character domains running $5,000 for a three-year registration. There are some sites related to the Northern Mariana Islands under third-level domains .gov.mp and .co.mp.

== Whois services ==
The MP Domain does not have public whois services available. Saipan DataCom will provide whois data in cases of potential trademark infringement. Although ICANN documents specify whois.nic.mp as of July 2018 this host does not resolve.

== Chi.mp ==
Saipan DataCom formerly operated chi.mp, a content hub and identity management platform providing .mp domains and websites. Old free .mp registrations provided earlier by chi.mp were terminated without a notice and the chi.mp web site has been defunct since at least May 2013. As of August 2021 get.mp is offering chi.mp for sale for $20,000.00. Mailchimp uses .mp as a domain hack (mailchi.mp) to redirect to its main website.

== See also ==
- Internet in the United States
- Internet in the Northern Mariana Islands
- .us
