= Edificio del Telégrafo =

Art Deco building in Santurce, Puerto Rico

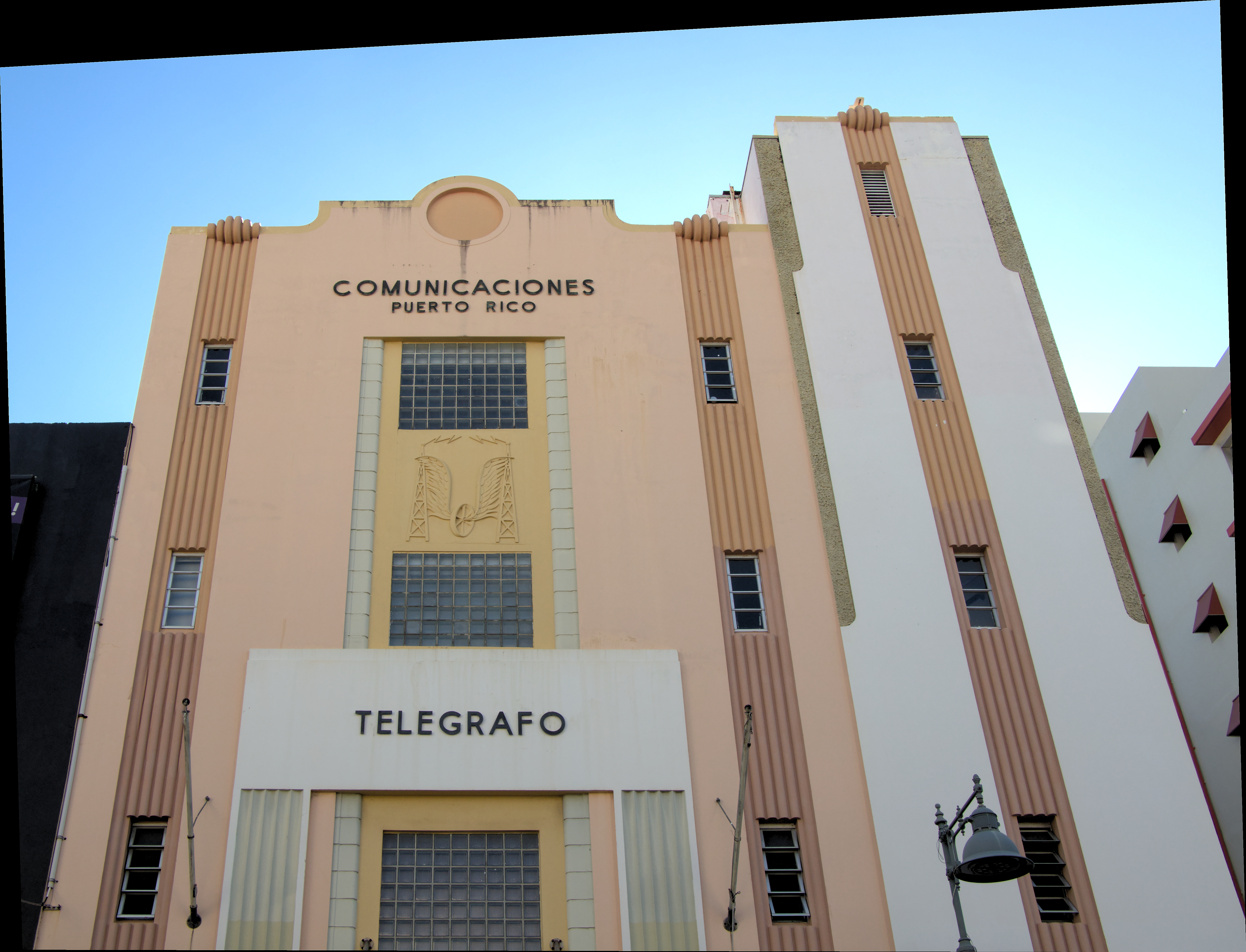
- The Edificio del Telégrafo on Ponce de León Avenue
- Alternative names: El Telégrafo

General information
- Architectural style: Art Deco
- Location: 1314 Juan Ponce de León Avenue, Parada 20, Santurce, San Juan, Puerto Rico
- Current tenants: Auditorio Salvador Brau
- Completed: 1947
- Owner: El Telégrafo, Inc.

The Edificio del Telégrafo (Spanish for "Telegraph Building"), also known simply as El Telégrafo, is an Art Deco building at 1314 Juan Ponce de León Avenue in Santurce, San Juan, Puerto Rico, at the transit stop known as Parada 20. Built to house the Puerto Rico Communications Authority, it contained the studios from which the public broadcaster WIPR began transmitting in 1949, and houses a theatre now known as the Auditorio Salvador Brau.

== History ==
=== Communications Authority ===
The Puerto Rico Communications Authority (Autoridad de Comunicaciones de Puerto Rico) was created by Law No. 212 of May 12, 1942. Five years after its founding, the agency was established at 1314 Ponce de León Avenue in Santurce.

During the 1940s a radio theatre was built within the structure for the use of WIPR, the government station attached to the Communications Authority.

=== WIPR ===
WIPR was inaugurated on Wednesday, January 26, 1949. The opening, which had been announced and postponed on several occasions, took the form of a special broadcast running from seven in the evening until midnight. Governor Luis Muñoz Marín was represented at the ceremony by Jaime Benítez, chancellor of the Río Piedras campus of the University of Puerto Rico.

On July 1, 1950, WIPR was transferred to the Department of Public Instruction while continuing to operate from the Communications Authority building. It broadcast at 940 kilocycles with a power of 10,000 watts. Its first artistic director and adviser was the composer Rafael Hernández, and the station maintained a symphony orchestra conducted by Jesús Figueroa and a sinfonietta conducted by Rafael González Peña.

On Tuesday, April 22, 1952, three years after the inauguration, a short circuit brought down one of the voltage breakers and caused a fire that spread through Studio A. WIPR was back on the air within hours; losses were estimated at $50,000. The station later moved its studios to another part of San Juan, and the theatre remained in use by the Communications Authority.

=== Teatro Salvador Brau ===
In the early 1960s, on the recommendation of artistic director Myrna Casas and with the approval of Governor Muñoz Marín, the theatre was named after Salvador Brau, the 19th-century Puerto Rican dramatist and historian.

Companies that staged work there during that period included La Máscara, Producciones Cisne, Teatro Incorporado, La Comedia Puertorriqueña and Children Theater. The Club Fílmico and the Corporación Cine Arte presented film cycles at the venue, and student productions were mounted by the Episcopal Cathedral School, the Academia del Sagrado Corazón and the Colegio Puertorriqueño de Niñas.

The theatre was rehabilitated and remodelled, but fell gradually into disuse in 1991 with the dissolution of the Communications Authority.

=== Later use ===
The building was rehabilitated in the 21st century and its facilities and infrastructure updated, and the Auditorio Salvador Brau reopened as a rental venue for performances and events. The building is operated by El Telégrafo, Inc.

A mural was painted over the original artwork that occupied the building's lobby.

== Architecture ==
The building is described by the Sociedad Puertorriqueña de Arquitectura Histórica as an example of Art Deco architecture in Santurce and is recorded as being in use and in good condition. It stands on Ponce de León Avenue near Calle Hipódromo, within the corridor of cultural institutions that includes the Puerto Rico Museum of Contemporary Art and the Luis A. Ferré Performing Arts Center.

Accounts differ on the building's original purpose: contemporary documentation of the Communications Authority describes it as the agency's headquarters, while some later descriptions state that it was built for the telephone company.

== See also ==
- Telecommunications in Puerto Rico
- Santurce, San Juan, Puerto Rico
- WIPR (AM)
