= .pr =

Internet country-code top level domain for Puerto Rico

- .pr Puerto Rico Top Level Domain
- Introduced: 27 August 1989
- TLD type: Country code top-level domain
- Status: Active
- Registry: Gauss Research Laboratory Inc
- Sponsor: Gauss Research Laboratory Inc
- Intended use: Entities connected with Puerto Rico
- Actual use: Fairly popular in Puerto Rico
- Registration restrictions: Some subdomains have restrictions; .isla.pr is less expensive but limited to Puerto Rico residents
- Structure: Registrations are at third level beneath second level labels; second-level registrations are available at higher cost
- Dispute policies: UDRP
- DNSSEC: yes
- Registry website: domains.pr/about.php

.pr is the Internet country code top-level domain (ccTLD) for Puerto Rico.

A .pr.us second-level domain has been reserved for Puerto Rico under the .us locality namespace, but it is unused. Agencies of the government of Puerto Rico use either .gov.pr or, more recently, subdomains of pr.gov, where the main government portal is located.

In March 2010, National Public Radio launched a URL shortener using the domain hack "n.pr".

The domain is occasionally used by public relations firms.

== Domains and sub domains ==
- .pr – for businesses, professionals, individuals, companies, etc.
- .biz.pr – for businesses
- .com.pr – for, but not restricted to, companies
- .edu.pr – for educational institutions with presence in Puerto Rico
- .gov.pr – for agencies of the government of Puerto Rico
- .info.pr – for informative websites
- .isla.pr – for people with presence in Puerto Rico
- .name.pr – for individuals
- .net.pr – for, but not restricted to, network oriented entities
- .org.pr – for, but not restricted to, organizations
- .pro.pr – for professionals
- .est.pr – for university students
- .prof.pr – for university professors
- .ac.pr – for academics

== See also ==
- Internet in Puerto Rico
- Internet in the United States
- .us
