= Gauss Research Laboratory =

Gauss Research Laboratory, Inc. is the corporation in charge of managing .pr, Puerto Rico's country code top-level domain, and is responsible for providing a stable and secure management of the domain. The company was incorporated on 17 November 2006.
