= Telecommunications in Puerto Rico =

Telecommunications in Puerto Rico includes radio, television, fixed and mobile telephones, and the Internet.

Broadcasting in Puerto Rico is regulated by the US Federal Communications Commission (FCC).

== History ==
Telegraph service was inaugurated in 1869, responding to an 1864 order by Spanish Governor Felix Maria Mesian. By 1872, the entire island had telegraph service as well as international connections to the rest of the Caribbean and Europe.

The Puerto Rico Communications Authority (La Autoridad de Comunicaciones de Puerto Rico) was created with Law No. 212, on May 12, 1942. Five years later, the department was located at 1314 Juan Ponce de León Avenue in Santurce, in the Edificio del Telégrafo, an Art Deco building completed in 1947 that housed the island's telegraph operations.

== Radio ==
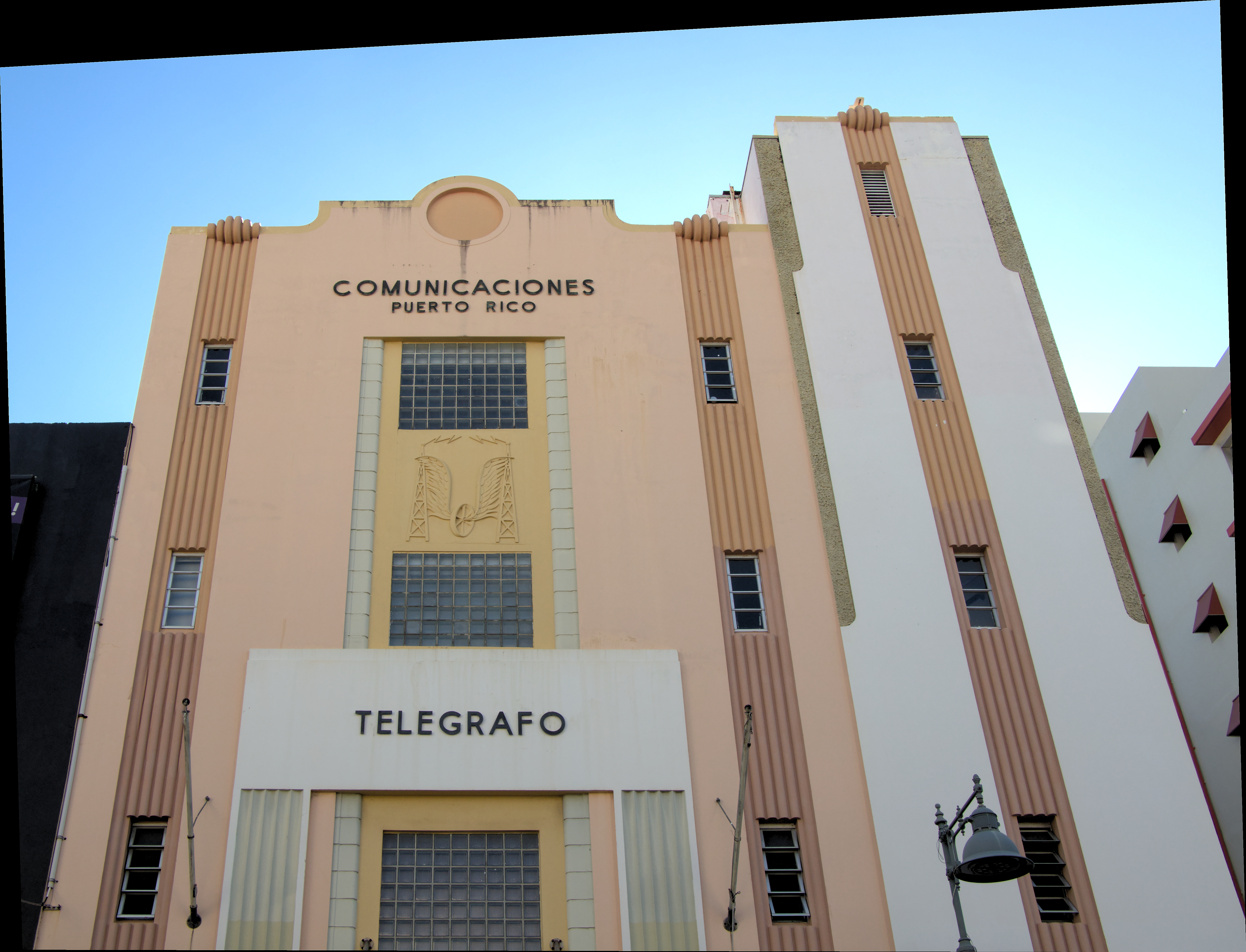
The Edificio del Telégrafo in Santurce, Puerto Rico, was built in 1947.

- Stations: 140 radio stations (as of January 2015).

== Television ==
WIPR-TV ("Wonderful Island of Puerto Rico") was inaugurated on January 26, 1949.

- Stations: more than 30 TV stations operating; three stations of the US Armed Forces Radio and Television Service; cable TV subscription services are available (2007).
- Television sets: 1.0 million sets (1997).

== Telephones ==
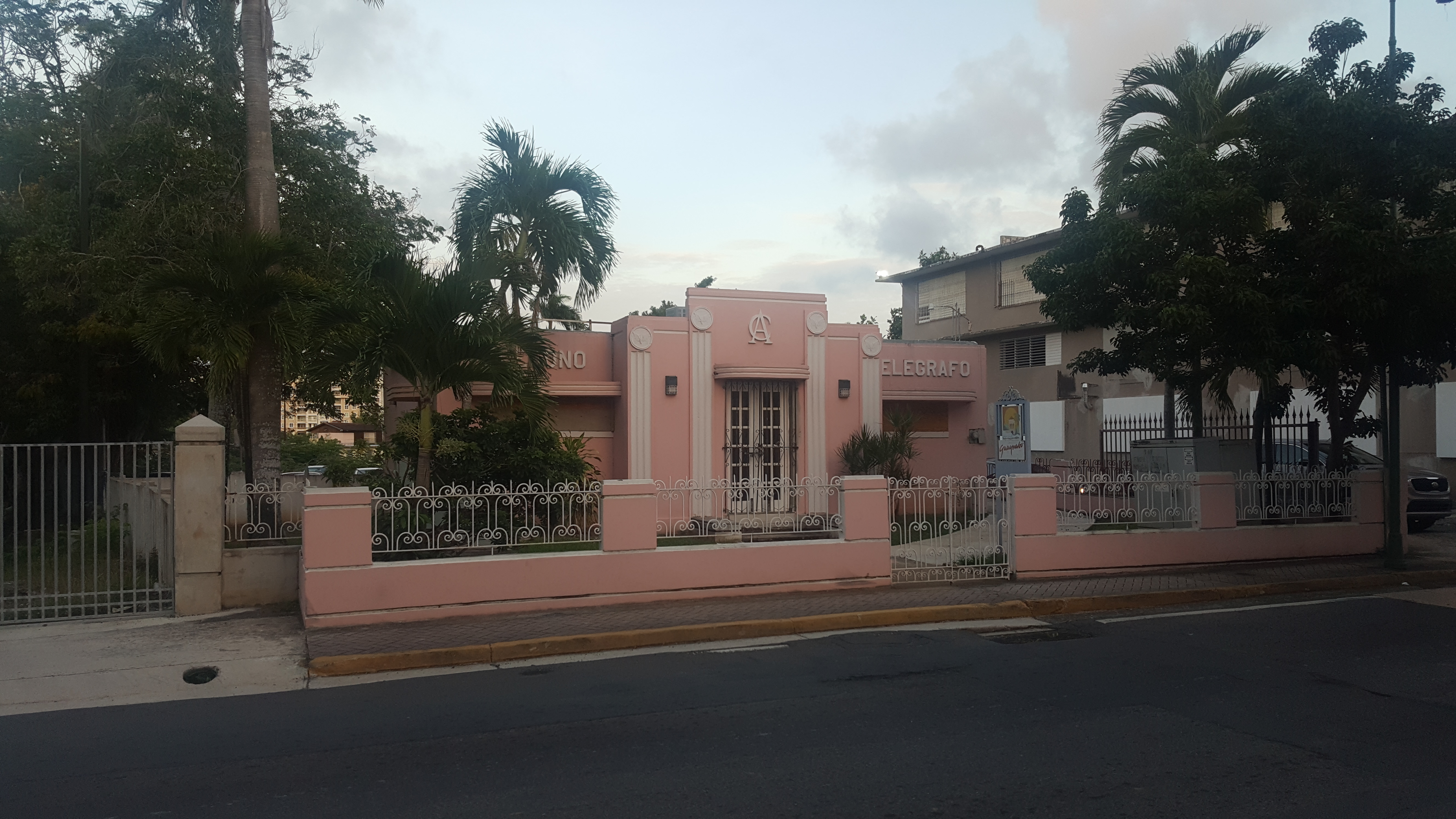
Historic building which is now a Telephone and Telegraph museum in Guaynabo, Puerto Rico

- Calling code-area codes: +1-787, +1-939
- International call prefix: 00
- Main lines: 780,200 lines in use, 87th in the world (2012).
- Mobile cellular: 3.1 million lines, 130th in the world (2012).
- System: modern digital system integrated with that of the United States (2011).
- Satellite earth stations: Intelsat with high-speed data capability (2011).
- Communications cables: provide connectivity to the US, Caribbean, Central and South America (2011).

== Internet ==
Hurricane Maria destroyed the internet systems in Puerto Rico in September 2017. Then in 2019, the US Federal Communications Commission stated $950 million had been approved for the rebuilding and strengthening of Puerto Rico's and the Virgin Island's internet infrastructure.

- Top-level domain: .pr
- Internet users: 1.9 million users, 92nd in the world; 51.4% of the population, 83rd in the world (2012).
- Fixed broadband: available to 65% of Puerto Ricans (2012).
- Wireless broadband: available to 98.7% of Puerto Ricans (2012).
- Available broadband technologies as a percentage of population: 48.2% DSL, 0.1% Fiber, 59.6% cable, 84.7% wireless (2012).
- Internet hosts: 469 hosts, 184th in the world (2012).
- IPv4: 1 million addresses allocated, less than 0.05% of the world total, 250.2 addresses per 1000 people (2012).
- Internet service providers: 19 ISPs (1999).

== See also ==
- Economy of Puerto Rico
- Internet Exchange of Puerto Rico
- Media of Puerto Rico
