= Hope, Providence, Rhode Island =

Coordinates: 41.85°N 71.4°W

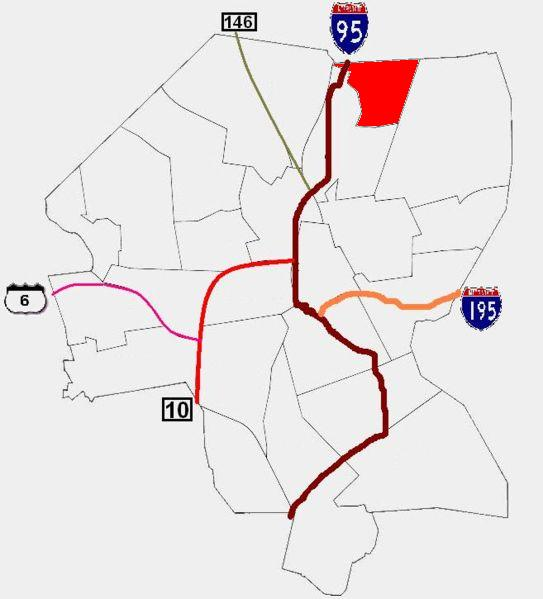
Providence neighborhoods with Hope in red

Hope is a neighborhood on the northern border of Providence, Rhode Island. To the west, it is bounded by North Main Street, the North Burial Ground, and Interstate 95, while Rochambeau Ave, Hope Street, and the Providence-Pawtucket city line roughly delineate its boundaries to the south, east, and north respectively. Hope is sometimes referred to as "Summit", named for the street that runs through the middle of the neighborhood. Though "Hope" is officially recognized, residents and the local neighborhood organization more often use "Summit".

== History ==
The area that is now Hope was first settled in the seventeenth century by farmers and tavernkeepers following present-day North Main Street out of the center of Providence, establishing a strong rural community.

Like many of Providence's neighborhoods, Hope did not experience appreciable development until the area was connected to downtown Providence by streetcar, happening in 1875. Large farming lots gave way to subdivision and the establishment of single-family homes. In the 1920s, many of these were bought by a growing community of Russian Jews who would have a strong presence in the area until World War II.

In 1945, Miriam Hospital relocated to Hope from its West End lot. Having expanded four times since then and opening a new medical building in 1989, the hospital now occupies a full two city blocks, with a parking lot filling out the third, now stretching from 5th Street to 8th Street.

Today, a community organization named the Summit Neighborhood Association publishes a quarterly newspaper and encourages participation in neighborhood activities.

== Demographics ==
For census purposes, the Census Bureau classifies Hope as part of the Census Tract 8. This neighborhood had 4,931 inhabitants based on data from the 2020 United States Census.

The racial makeup of the neighborhood was 82.1% (3,697) White (Non-Hispanic), 5.1% (231) Black (Non-Hispanic), 3.5% (159) Asian, 4.8% (214) from some other race or from two or more races. Hispanic or Latino of any race were 4.5% (204) of the population. 13.7% are foreign born, with most foreign born residents originating from Europe (35%) and Asia (34%).

The median age in this area is 42.5 years old. Family Households made up 70% of the population, and the average household (family and non-family) had 2.1 persons living there. 43% of the population was married. Out of the 2,230 vacant and non-vacant housing units, 64% were owner occupied, and 36% renter occupied. The average house was worth $423,600, which is significantly higher than the average in Providence. 11.6% of residents are below the poverty line.

== Disambiguation ==
- Hope Village Historic District—Located in the town of Scituate, RI is served by the US Postal Service as Hope, RI 02831
- Hope Valley, Rhode Island—A Census Designated Place located within the town of Hopkinton, RI
