= Internet Exchange of Puerto Rico =

Former internet exchange point

The first two routers attached to IXPR

The Internet Exchange of Puerto Rico a.k.a. Puerto Rico Internet Exchange (IXPR) is an internet exchange point situated in San Juan, Puerto Rico. It was established on November 22, 2005, by Mehmet Akcin and Dr. Oscar Moreno.

IXPR was the first internet exchange point set in Puerto Rico and the Caribbean., ULTRACOM was the first provider to exchange data through the point. IXPR used a Cisco gigabit Ethernet switch.

The exchange point stopped operating in 2007 and was re-established again in 2020
