= South Texas Development Council =

- Logo

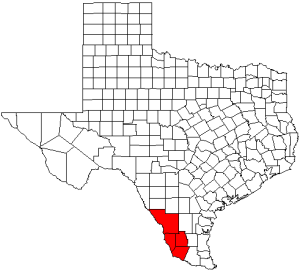
- Map of Texas highlighting counties served by the South Texas Development Council
- Formation: June 1966
- Type: Voluntary association of governments
- Region served: 6,643 sq mi (17,210 km^{2})
- Members: 4 counties

Historical population
Year	Pop.	±%
2000	264,177	—
2006	312,279	+18.2%

Based in Laredo, South Texas Development Council (STDC) is a voluntary association of cities, counties and special districts in southern Texas.

== Counties served ==
- Jim Hogg
- Starr
- Webb
- Zapata

== Cities in the region ==
- Laredo
- Rio Grande City
- Roma
- Rio Bravo
- Zapata
- El Cenizo
- Escobares
- La Grulla
