= Fuerte Island =

Small coral island in the Caribbean Sea

Native name: Isla Fuerte
- Interactive map of Fuerte Island

Geography
- Location: Caribbean Sea
- Coordinates: 09°23′20″N 76°10′45″W
- Area: 3.25 km^{2} (1.25 sq mi)
- Length: 2.45 km (1.522 mi)
- Width: 1.45 km (0.901 mi)
- Highest elevation: 15 m (49 ft)

Administration
- Colombia
- Department: Bolívar Department
- Municipality: Cartagena de Indias

Demographics
- Population: 2,500

Fuerte Island (Isla Fuerte) is a small coral island in the Caribbean Sea off the northern coast of Colombia, Córdoba department, located south of the Gulf of Morrosquillo. It is located at a distance of 11 km from mainland Colombia. It is part of the chain of islands formed by the Rosario Islands, the Archipelago of San Bernardo and Tortuguilla Island.

== Geography and climate ==
Fuerte Island is approximately 1.45 km in diameter and 2.45 km from north to south. The island has an area of 3.25 km^{2} and an elevation of 12m. The island is encircled by reefs and some scattered rocks. Some of the rocks are visible above the water line.

Fuerte Island is described as being part of tropical dry broadleaf forest.

== Demographics ==
As of 2020, there were approximately 2,000 people permanently living on Fuerte Island including 570 families.

In 1995, there were 1,086 people permanently living on the island.

== Government ==
Despite only being 11 km away from San Bernardo del Viento, in the Córdoba Department, Fuerte Island is a corregimiento of Cartagena. After the creation of the Córdoba Department in 1952, the Bolívar Department retained control of Isla Fuerte and placed it under the management of Cartagena de Indias, approximately 150 kilometers from the island.

Despite not having a police unit, the island has a single police inspector whose main role is to promote peaceful resolutions within the community. The island is frequently patrolled by coastguard units of the Colombian Navy.

== Economy ==
Fuerte Island has historically been dependent on artisanal fishing however tourism is now the predominant economic activity on the island.

== Fauna and flora ==
=== Fauna ===
==== Birds ====
Over 80 species of birds have been recorded on Fuerte Island including:

- Brown booby
- Brown-throated parakeet
- Chestnut-fronted macaw
- Great-tailed grackle
- Magnificent frigatebird
- Orange-winged amazon
- Ruddy turnstone
- Tropical kingbird
- White-crowned pigeon
- Yellow-headed caracara

==== Mammals ====
- Bats (various)
- Brown-throated sloth
- Equus asinus (introduced)

==== Sharks ====
The most common shark species spotted near the island are the Blacktip shark, the Brazilian sharpnose shark, the Caribbean sharpnose shark and, to a lesser extent, the Tiger and Great hammerhead sharks. However, out of the 24 shark species that can be found in Colombia, 16 species have been recorded in the waters near Fuerte Island including:

- Blacknose shark
- Blacktip shark
- Bonnethead
- Brazilian sharpnose shark
- Caribbean reef shark
- Caribbean sharpnose shark
- Dusky shark
- Dusky smooth-hound
- Great hammerhead
- Nurse shark
- Scalloped hammerhead
- Silky shark
- Smalleye hammerhead
- Smalltail shark
- Tiger shark
- Whale shark

=== Flora ===
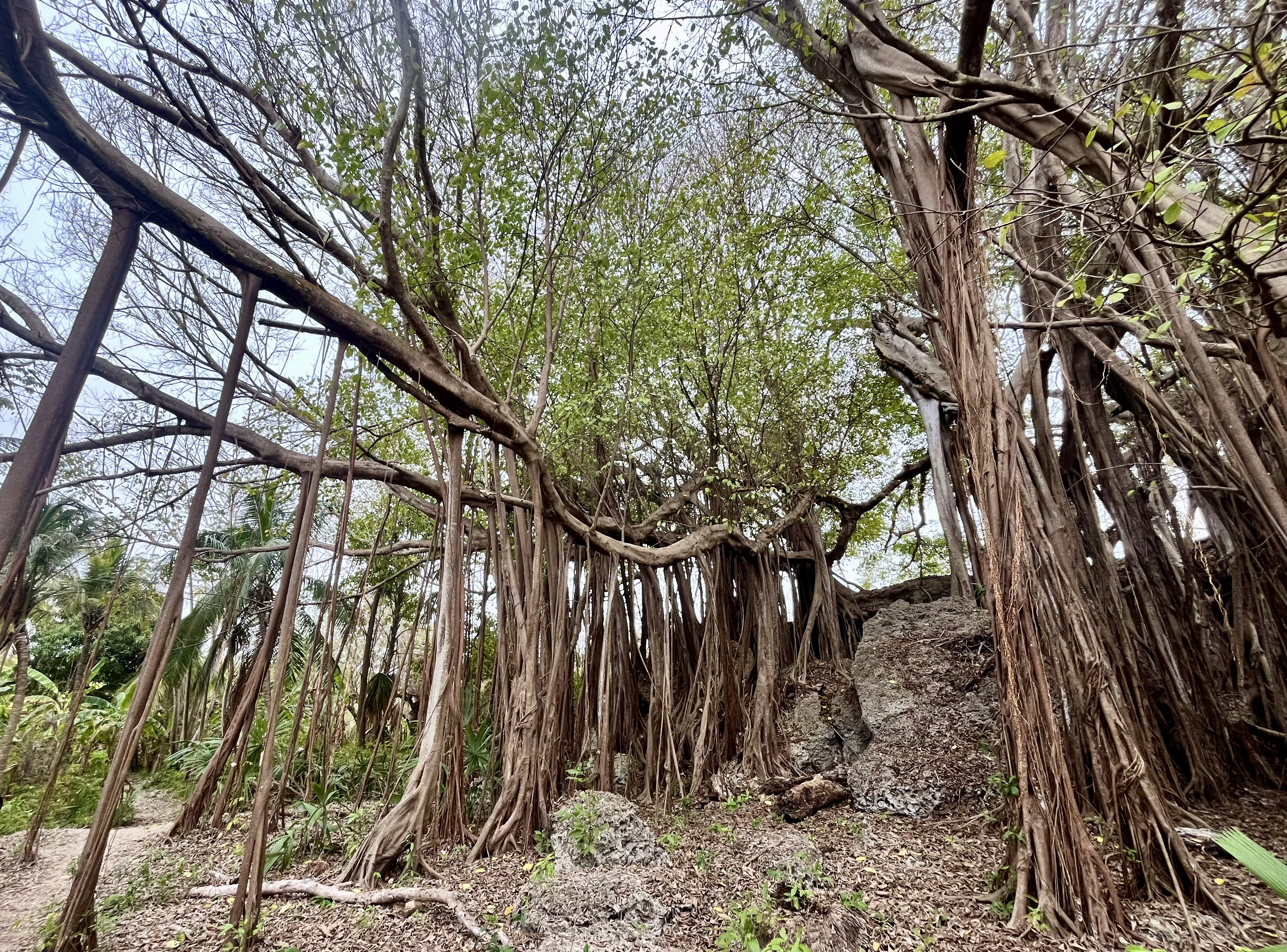
El arbol que camina (The walking tree) is a famous Ficus benghalensis tree on the island.

Royal palm trees are widespread on the island. Mangrove forests, mostly composed by black, red, and white mangroves are present in different coastal parts of the island. Other plants, like sea grapes and turtle grass are also commonly found. Mangifera indica is widely grown on the island for local consumption.

On the island, there are three individual trees which are locally renowned due to their age and size. The first is the Arbol que camina, which is a Ficus benghalensis tree that has grown multiple aerial roots that give it a walking appearance. The second is a Sterculia apetala tree called Tun-Tun, whose name was derived from the sound of one's heartbeat that can be heard while hugging the tree due to its hollow nature. The last of three is a large Ceiba pentandra tree called La bonga.

== See also ==
- Caribbean region of Colombia
- Insular region of Colombia
- List of islands of South America
