= Geography of Colombia =

- Continent: South America
- Region: Caribbean South America
- Coordinates: 4°00′N 72°00′W
- Area: Ranked 25th
  - Total: 1,141,748 km^{2} (440,831 sq mi)
  - Land: 91.2%
  - Water: 8.8%
- Coastline: 3,208 km (1,993 mi)
- Borders: Total land borders: 6,672 km (4,146 mi) Venezuela: 2,341 km (1,455 mi); Brazil: 1,790 km (1,110 mi); Peru: 1,494 km (928 mi); Ecuador: 708 km (440 mi); Panama: 266 km (165 mi)
- Highest point: Pico Cristobal Colon; 5,775 metres (18,947 ft)
- Lowest point: Pacific Ocean; 0 metres (0 ft)
- Longest river: Magdalena River 1,528 km (949 mi)
- Largest lake: Lake Tota 55 km^{2} (21 mi^{2})
- Exclusive economic zone: 808,158 km^{2} (312,032 mi^{2})

The Republic of Colombia is situated largely in the north-west of South America, with some territories falling within the boundaries of Central America. It is bordered to the north-west by Panama; to the east by Brazil and Venezuela; to the south by Ecuador and Peru; and it shares maritime limits with Costa Rica, Nicaragua, Honduras, Jamaica, the Dominican Republic, and Haiti.

Colombia has a land size of 1,141,748 km^{2} (440,831 mi^{2}) and it is the 25th largest nation in the world and the fourth-largest country in South America (after Brazil, Argentina, and Peru). Colombia's population is not evenly distributed, and most of the people live in the mountainous western portion of the country as well as along the northern coastline; the highest number live in or near the capital city of Bogotá. The southern and eastern portions of the country are sparsely inhabited, consisting of tropical rainforest, and inland tropical plains that contain large estates or large livestock farms, oil and gas production facilities, small farming communities, and indigenous tribes with their territories. Colombia has the 35th largest Exclusive Economic Zone of 808,158 km^{2} (312,032 mi^{2}).

== Regions ==
Colombia usually classifies its geography into five natural regions, from the Andes mountain range, a region shared with Ecuador, Venezuela; the Pacific Ocean coastal region, shared with Panama and Ecuador; the Caribbean Sea coastal region, shared with Venezuela and Panama; the Llanos (plains), shared with Venezuela; to the Amazon rainforest region shared with Venezuela, Brazil, Peru and Ecuador. Colombia is one of only two South American countries that have coastline on both the Atlantic and Pacific oceans, the other being Chile.

The World Factbook does not differentiate between the Amazon region of Colombia (predominantly jungle) and the Orinoquia region of Colombia (predominantly plains). It suggests dividing the country into four geographic regions: the Andean highlands, consisting of the three Andean ranges and intervening valley lowlands; the Caribbean lowlands coastal region; the Pacific lowlands coastal region, separated from the Caribbean lowlands by swamps at the base of the Isthmus of Panama; and eastern Colombia, the great plain that lies to the east of the Andes Mountains.

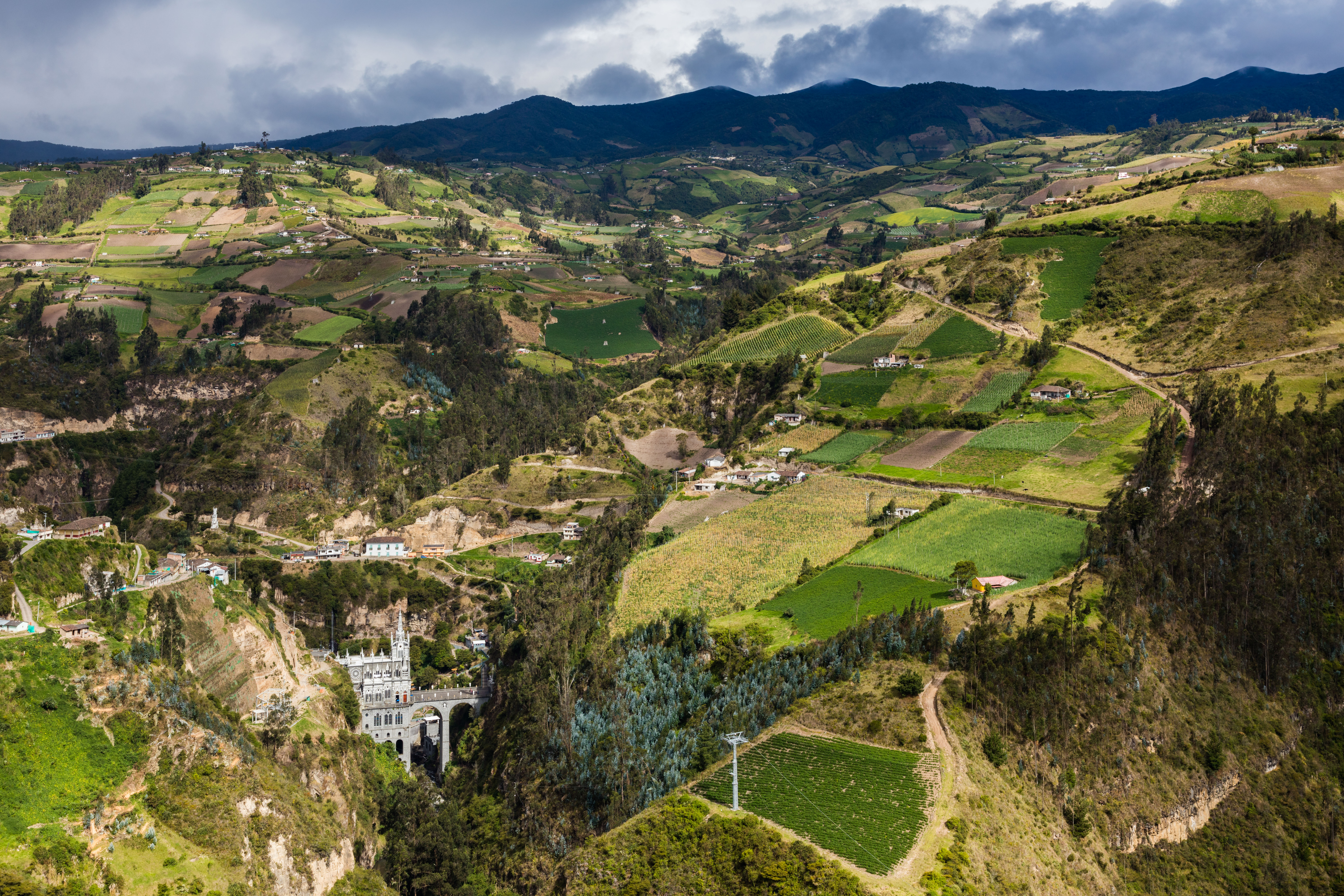
Nariño Department

The chief western mountain range, the Cordillera Occidental, is a moderately high range with peaks reaching up to about 15,000 ft (4,572 m) (4,670 m). The Cauca River Valley, an important agricultural region with several large cities on its borders, separates the Cordillera Occidental from the massive Cordillera Central. Several snow-clad volcanoes in the Cordillera Central have summits that rise above 17,000 ft (5,182 m). The valley of the slow-flowing and muddy Magdalena River, a major transportation artery, separates the Cordillera Central from the main eastern range, the Cordillera Oriental. The peaks of the Cordillera Oriental are moderately high. This range differs from Colombia's other mountain ranges in that it contains several large basins. In the east, the sparsely populated, flat to gently rolling eastern lowlands called llanos cover almost 60 percent of the country's total land area.

This cross section of the republic does not include two of Colombia's regions: the Caribbean coastal lowlands and the Sierra Nevada de Santa Marta, both in the northern part of the country. The lowlands in the west are mostly swampy; the reed-filled marshes of the area are called ciénagas by the people of Colombia. The Guajira Peninsula in the east is semiarid and is occupied primarily by indigenous peoples. The Sierra Nevada de Santa Marta is a spectacular triangular snowcapped block of rock that towers over the eastern part of this lowland. Here can be found the highest peak of the country, named Pico Cristobal Colon (5775 m).

=== Andean region ===
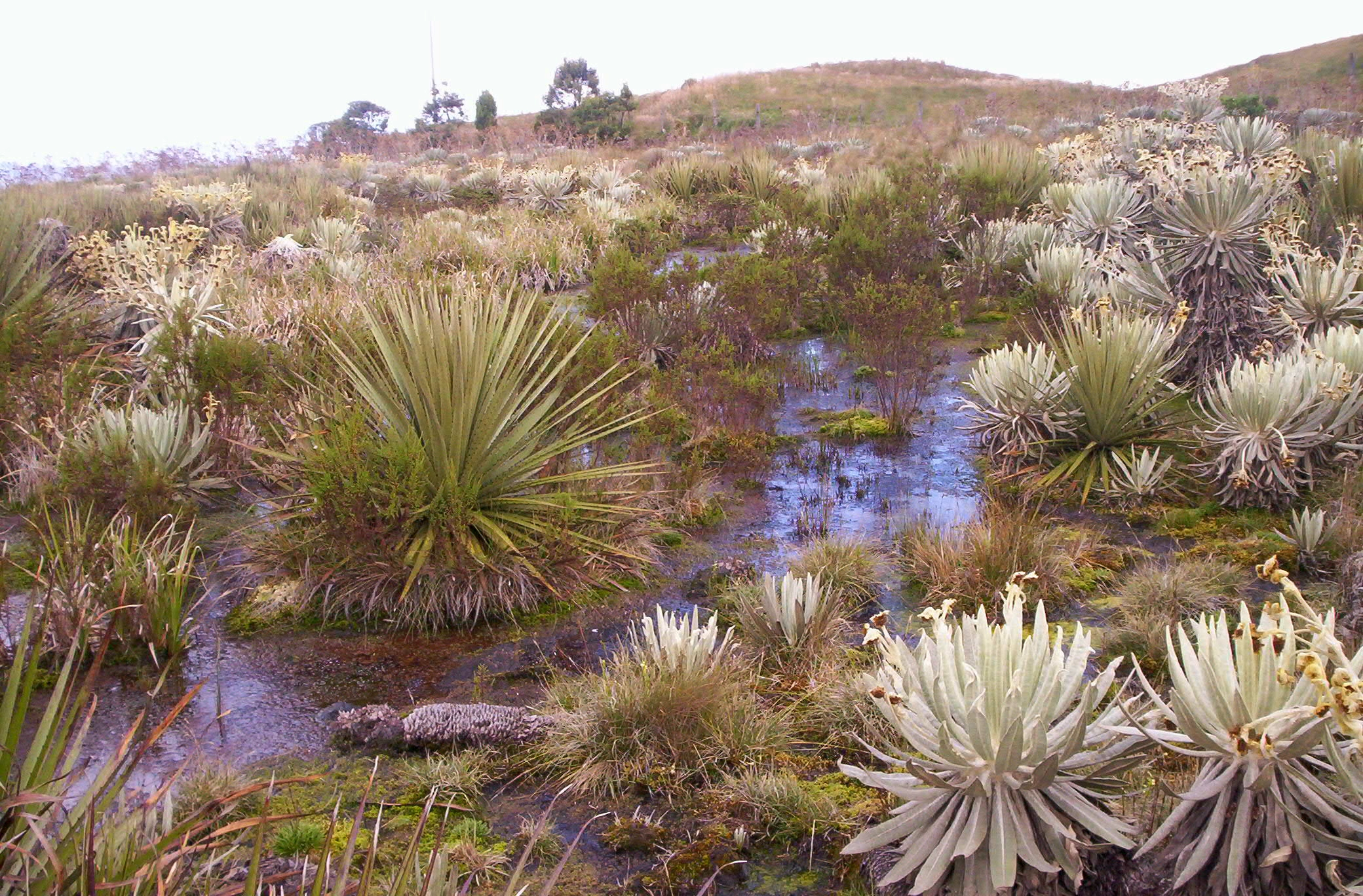
Páramo of Rabanal, Boyacá.

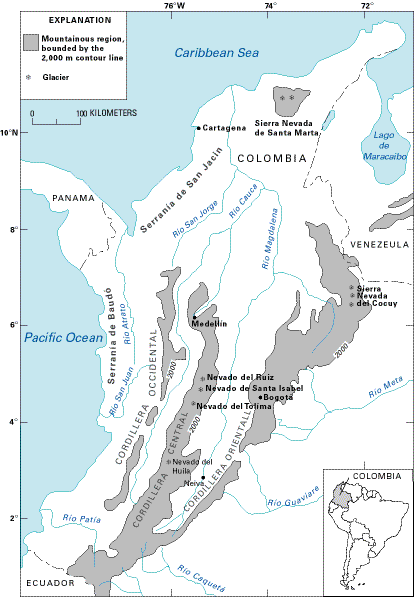
Glaciers in Colombia.

Near the Ecuadorian frontier, the Andes Mountains divide into three distinct, roughly parallel chains, called cordilleras, that extend northeastward almost to the Caribbean Sea. Altitudes reach more than 18,700 ft (5,700 m), and mountain peaks are permanently covered with snow. The elevated basins and plateaus of these ranges have a moderate climate that provides pleasant living conditions and in many places enables farmers to harvest twice a year. Torrential rivers on the slopes of the mountains produce a large hydroelectric power potential and add their volume to the navigable rivers in the valleys. In the late 1980s, approximately 78 percent of the country's population lived in the Andean highlands.

The Cordillera Occidental in the west, the Cordillera Central in the center, and the Cordillera Oriental in the east have different characteristics. Geologically, the Cordillera Occidental and the Cordillera Central form the western and eastern sides of a massive crystalline arch that extends from the Caribbean lowlands to the southern border of Ecuador. The Cordillera Oriental, however, is composed of folded stratified rocks overlying a crystalline core.

The Cordillera Occidental is relatively low and is the least populated of the three cordilleras. Summits are only about 9,840 ft (2,999 m) above sea level and do not have permanent snows. Few passes exist, although one that is about 4,985 ft (1,519 m) above sea level provides the major city of Cali with an outlet to the Pacific Ocean. The relatively low elevation of the cordillera permits dense vegetation, which on the western slopes is truly tropical.

The Cordillera Occidental is separated from the Cordillera Central by the deep rift of the Cauca Valley. The Río Cauca rises within 124 mi (200 km) of the border with Ecuador and flows through some of the best farmland in the country. After the two cordilleras converge, the Cauca Valley becomes a deep gorge reaching to the Caribbean lowlands.

The Cordillera Central is the loftiest of the mountain systems. Its crystalline rocks form a towering wall dotted with snow-covered volcanoes that is 500 mi (805 km) long. There are no plateaus in this range and no passes under 10,825 ft (3,299 m). The highest peak in this range, the Nevado del Huila, reaches 17,602 ft (5,365 m) above sea level. The second highest peak is a volcano, Nevado del Ruiz, which erupted violently on November 13, 1985. Toward its northern end, this cordillera separates into several branches that descend toward the Caribbean coast.

Between the Cordillera Central and the Cordillera Oriental flows the Magdalena River. This 1,600-kilometre-long (994 mi) river rises near a point some 180 km (112 mi) north of the border with Ecuador, where the Cordillera Oriental and the Cordillera Central diverge. Its spacious drainage area is fed by numerous mountain torrents originating high in the snowfields. The Magdalena River is generally navigable from the Caribbean Sea as far as the town of Neiva, deep in the interior, but it is interrupted midway by rapids. The valley floor is very deep; nearly 800 km (497 mi) from the river's mouth the elevation is no more than about 300 meters (984 ft).

In the Cordillera Oriental, at elevations between 2,500 and 2,700 meters (8,202 and 8,858 ft), three large fertile basins and a number of small ones provide suitable areas for settlement and intensive economic production. In the basin of Cundinamarca, where the Spanish encountered the regional Chibcha Indians, the European invaders established the town of Santa Fe de Bogotá (present-day Bogotá) at an elevation of 2,650 meters (8,694 ft) above sea level.

To the north of Bogotá, in the densely populated basins of Chiquinquirá and Boyacá, are fertile fields, rich mines, and large industrial establishments that produce much of the national wealth. Still farther north, where the Cordillera Oriental makes an abrupt turn to the northwest near the border with Venezuela, the Sierra Nevada de Cocuy, the highest point of this range, rises to 5,493 meters (18,022 ft) above sea level. In the department of Santander, the valleys on the western slopes are more spacious, and agriculture is intensive in the area around Bucaramanga. The northernmost region of the range around Cúcuta is so rugged that historically it has been easier for residents here to maintain communications and transportation with Venezuela than with the adjacent parts of Colombia.

The basic plantation of Colombia is grassy and is near the equator which allows many tropical-like plants.

=== Caribbean region ===
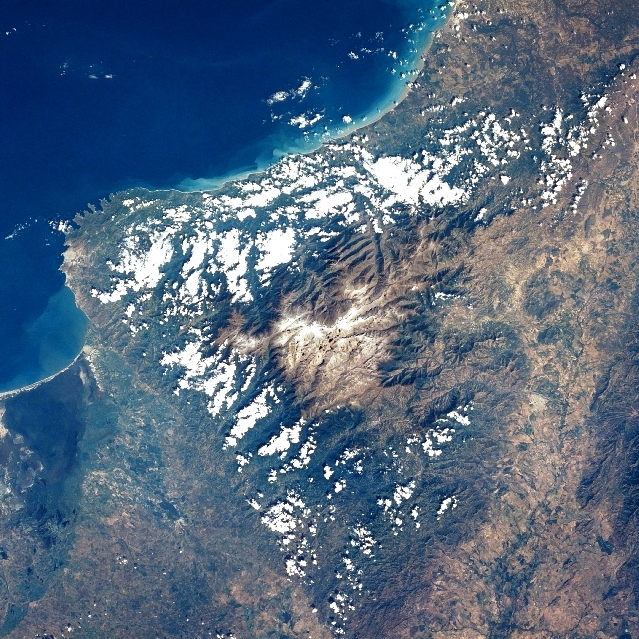
Sierra Nevada de Santa Marta, the highest standing mountain by the sea.

The Caribbean lowlands consist of all of Colombia north of an imaginary line extending northeastward from the Golfo de Urabá to the Venezuelan frontier at the northern extremity of the Cordillera Oriental. The semiarid Guajira Peninsula and Guajira–Barranquilla xeric scrub, in the extreme north, bear little resemblance to the rest of the region. In the southern part rises the Sierra Nevada de Santa Marta, an isolated mountain system with peaks reaching heights over 5,700 meters (18,701 ft) and slopes generally too steep for cultivation.

The Caribbean lowlands region is in roughly the shape of a triangle, the longest side of which is the coastline. Most of the country's commerce moves through the cities of Cartagena, Barranquilla, Santa Marta, and the other ports located along this important coast. Inland from these cities are swamps, hidden streams, and shallow lakes that support banana and cotton plantations for major commodity crops, countless small farms, and, in higher places, cattle ranches.

The city of Cartagena is a petrochemical, seaport (#1 in the country), and tourist city (#1 in the country). Santa Marta is also a seaport and tourist city but it is smaller scale city in comparison. Barranquilla is located some 25 miles (40 km) from the Caribbean coastline but it is a more developed city, with a greater number of industries and commercial places, widely known for its skilled workers in producing all forms of metalwork and accomplishing construction. Its inhabitants have the highest education level of the region. The city is famous as the starting point and focus of the region and the country's development: it was the first city in the nation to install and use telephones, public lighting, air mail, planes, and industrial works.

The Caribbean region merges next to and is connected with the Andean highlands through the two great river valleys. After the Andean highlands, it is the second-most important region in terms of economic activity. Approximately 17% of the country's population lived in this region in the late 1980s.

The region also includes the peninsular archipelago of San Andres Island and the Insular Territories of Colombia, which are disputed in part by Nicaragua. However, the Colombian Navy protects such territories with the use of force when necessary to avoid foreign invasion. The islands are fortified with two important bases for defense and custom controls. These were formerly used for research of classified projects with civilian assistance; the local universities often conduct research in the areas of oceanography and marine biology but also in the fields of biochemistry, genetics and immunology. Colombia is known for its advances in medical fields in experimental surgery, breast implant development, or prosthetics, and immunology. These facilities serve as containment and secure experimentation labs to complement those in Barranquilla and other undisclosed locations within the coast territories.

The Insular Region is considered by some as a geopolitical region of Colombia. It comprises the areas outside the continental territories of Colombia and includes the San Andrés y Providencia Department in the Caribbean Sea and the Malpelo and Gorgona islands in the Pacific Ocean. Its subregions include other groups of islands:

- Archipiélago de San Bernardo (in the Morrosquillo Gulf, Caribbean).
- Islas del Rosario (Caribbean)
- Isla Fuerte (Caribbean)
- Isla Barú (Caribbean)
- Isla Tortuguilla (Caribbean)
- Isla Tierra Bomba (Caribbean)

=== Pacific region ===
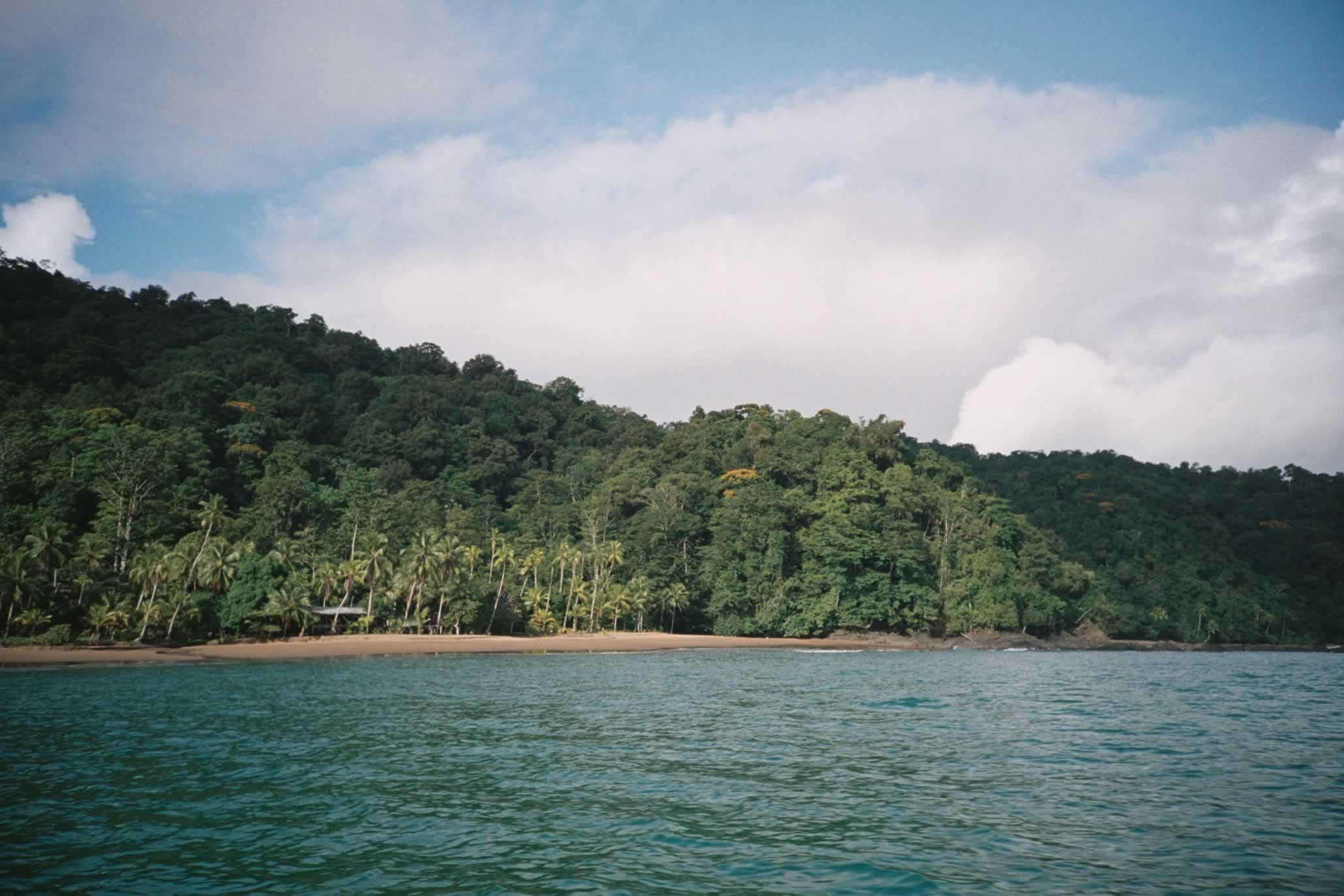
The coast of the Pacific in Chocó

The western third of the country is the most geographically complex. Starting at the shore of the Pacific Ocean in the west and moving eastward at a latitude of 5 degrees north, a diverse sequence of features is encountered. In the extreme west are the very narrow and discontinuous Pacific coastal lowlands, which are backed by the Serranía de Baudó, the lowest and narrowest of Colombia's mountain ranges. Next is the broad region of the Río Atrato/Río San Juan lowland.

In 1855, William Kennish, an engineer and veteran of the British Royal Navy, who had immigrated to the United States and was working for a New York City firm, studied the area and proposed an inter-oceanic river aqueduct and tunnel to connect the Rio Atrato, with its mouth at the Atlantic Ocean, with tributaries and through a tunnel and aqueduct through Nerqua Pass, to flow into Bahía Humboldt at the Pacific Ocean.

This was his alternative to the canal that was eventually built further west on the isthmus of what became Panama after it gained independence in the early 20th century. Although the US sent an expedition to explore Kennish's proposal, the concept was not developed at the time. Colombia refused a later US offer to build a canal. After independence, in 1903 Panama made a treaty with the US to support construction of the Panama Canal. Colombia occupies most of the Andes mountain range northern extremity, sharing a bit with Venezuela; the range splits into three branches between the Colombia-Ecuador border.

In the 1980s, only three percent of all Colombians resided in the Pacific lowlands, a region of jungle and swamp with considerable but little-exploited potential in minerals and other resources. Later in the 20th century, it was threatened by mining-related deforestation, as gold mining proceeded by both major companies and artisan miners. Buenaventura is the only port of any size on the coast. To the east, the Pacific lowlands are bounded by the Cordillera Occidental, from which numerous streams run. Most of the streams flow westward to the Pacific, but the largest, the navigable Río Atrato, flows northward to the Golfo de Urabá. Its river settlements have access to the major Atlantic ports and consequently are commercially related primarily to the Caribbean lowlands hinterland. To the west of the Río Atrato rises the Serranía de Baudó, an isolated chain of low mountains that occupies a large part of the region. Its highest elevation is less than 1,800 meters, and its vegetation resembles that of the surrounding tropical forest.

The Atrato Swamp, in Chocó Department adjoining the border with Panama, is a deep muck sixty-five kilometers in width. For years it has challenged engineers seeking to complete the Pan-American Highway. This stretch, near Turbo, where the highway is interrupted, is known as the Tapón del Chocó (Chocon Plug).

A second major transportation project in Chocó Department has been proposed. A second inter-oceanic canal would be constructed by dredging the Río Atrato and tributary streams and digging short access canals. Completion of either of these projects would do much to transform this region, although it could have devastating consequences on the fragile, tropical forest environment.

=== Orinoquía region ===
The area east of the Andes includes about 699,300 square kilometers or three-fifths of the country's total area, but Colombians view it almost as an alien land. The entire area, known as the eastern plains, was home to only two percent of the country's population in the late 1980s. The Spanish term for plains (llanos) can be applied only to the open plains in the northern part, particularly the Piedmont areas near the Cordillera Oriental, where extensive cattle raising is practiced.

The region is unbroken by highlands except in Meta Department, where the Serranía de la Macarena, an outlier of the Andes has unique vegetation and wildlife believed to be reminiscent of those that once existed throughout the Andes.

=== Amazon region ===
Many of the numerous large rivers of eastern Colombia are navigable. The Río Guaviare and the streams to its north flow eastward and drain into the basin of the Río Orinoco, a river that crosses into Venezuela and flows into the Atlantic Ocean. Those south of the Río Guaviare flows into the Amazon Basin. The Río Guaviare divides eastern Colombia into the llanos subregion in the north and the tropical rainforest, or selva, subregion in the south.

== Climate ==
Colombia map of Köppen climate classification zones

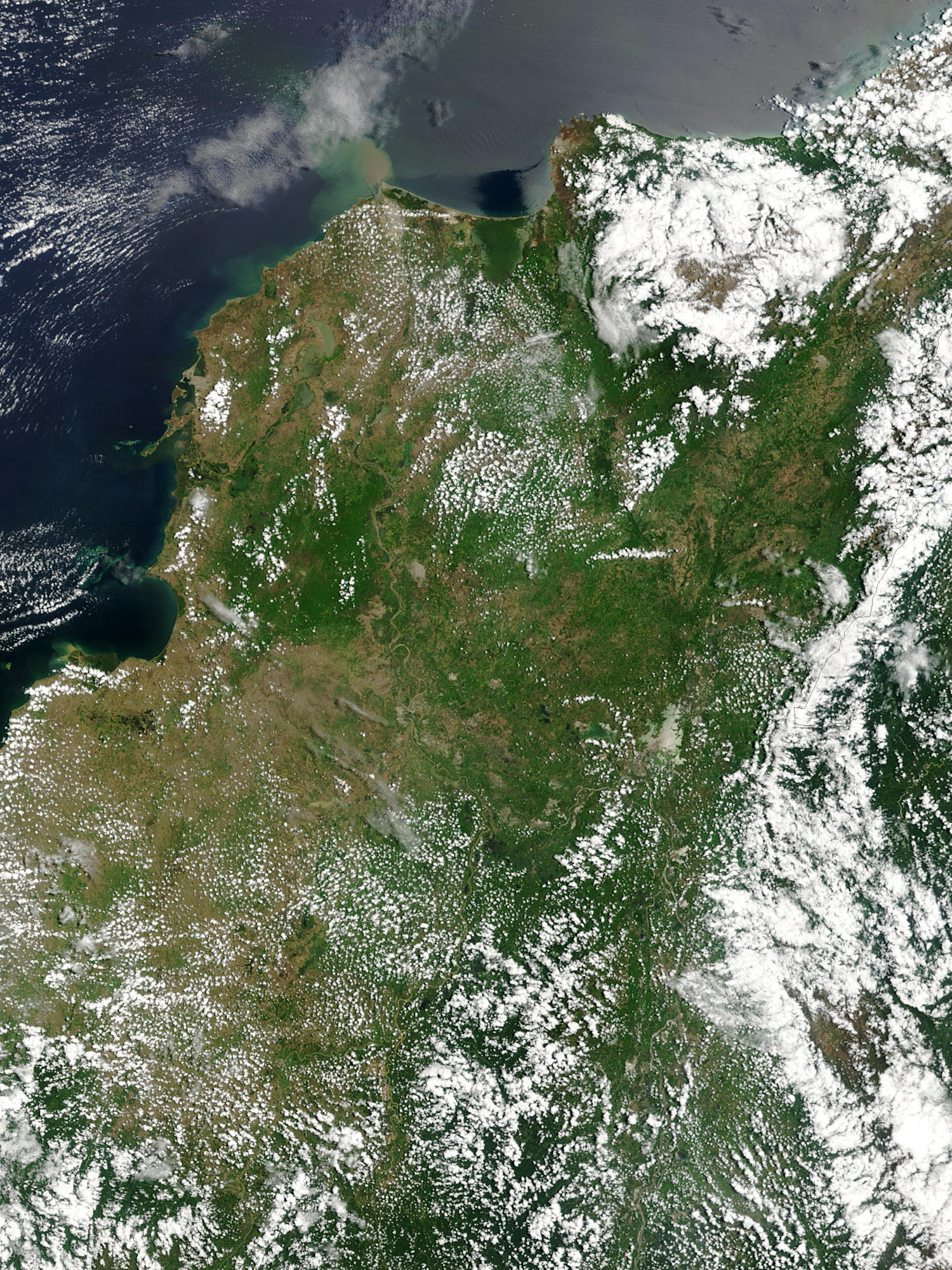
Flooding in Colombia, April 2004

The striking variety in temperature and precipitation results principally from differences in elevation. Temperatures range from very hot at sea level to relatively cold at higher elevations but vary little with the season. At Bogotá, for example, the average annual temperature is 15 °C (59 °F), and the difference between the average of the coldest and the warmest months is less than 1 °C (1.8 °F). More significant, however, is the daily variation in temperature, from 5 °C (41 °F) at night to 17 °C (62.6 °F) during the day.

Colombians customarily describe their country in terms of the climatic zones: the area under 900 meters (2,953 ft) in elevation is called the hot zone (tierra caliente), elevations between 900 and 1,980 meters (2,953 and 6,496 ft) are the temperate zone (tierra templada), and elevations from 1,980 meters (6,496 ft) to about 3,500 meters (11,483 ft) constitute the cold zone (tierra fría). The upper limit of the cold zone marks the tree line and the approximate limit of human habitation. The treeless regions adjacent to the cold zone and extending to approximately 4,500 meters (14,764 ft) are high, bleak areas (usually referred to as the páramos), above which begins the area of permanent snow (nevado).

About 86% of the country's total area lies in the hot zone. Included in the hot zone and interrupting the temperate area of the Andean highlands are the long and narrow extension of the Magdalena Valley and a small extension in the Cauca Valley. Temperatures, depending on elevation, vary between 24 and 38 °C (75.2 and 100.4 °F), and there are alternating dry and wet seasons corresponding to summer and winter, respectively. Breezes on the Caribbean coast, however, reduce both heat and precipitation.

Rainfall in the hot zone is heaviest in the Pacific lowlands and in parts of eastern Colombia, where rain is almost a daily occurrence and rain forests predominate. Precipitation exceeds 7,600 millimeters (299.2 in) annually in most of the Pacific lowlands, making this one of the wettest regions in the world. The highest average annual precipitation in the world is estimated to be in Lloro, Colombia, with 13,299 mm (523.6 in). In eastern Colombia, it decreases from 6,350 millimeters (250 in) in portions of the Andean Piedmont to 2,540 millimeters (100 in) eastward. Extensive areas of the Caribbean interior are permanently flooded, more because of poor drainage than because of the moderately heavy precipitation during the rainy season from May through October.

The temperate zone covers about 8% of the country. This zone includes the lower slopes of the Cordillera Oriental and the Cordillera Central and most of the intermontane valleys. The important cities of Medellín (1,487 meters or 4,879 feet) and Cali (1,030 meters or 3,379 feet) are located in this zone, where rainfall is moderate and the mean annual temperature varies between 19 and 24 °C (66.2 and 75.2 °F), depending on the elevation. In the higher elevations of this zone, farmers benefit from two wet and two dry seasons each year; January through March and July through September are the dry seasons.

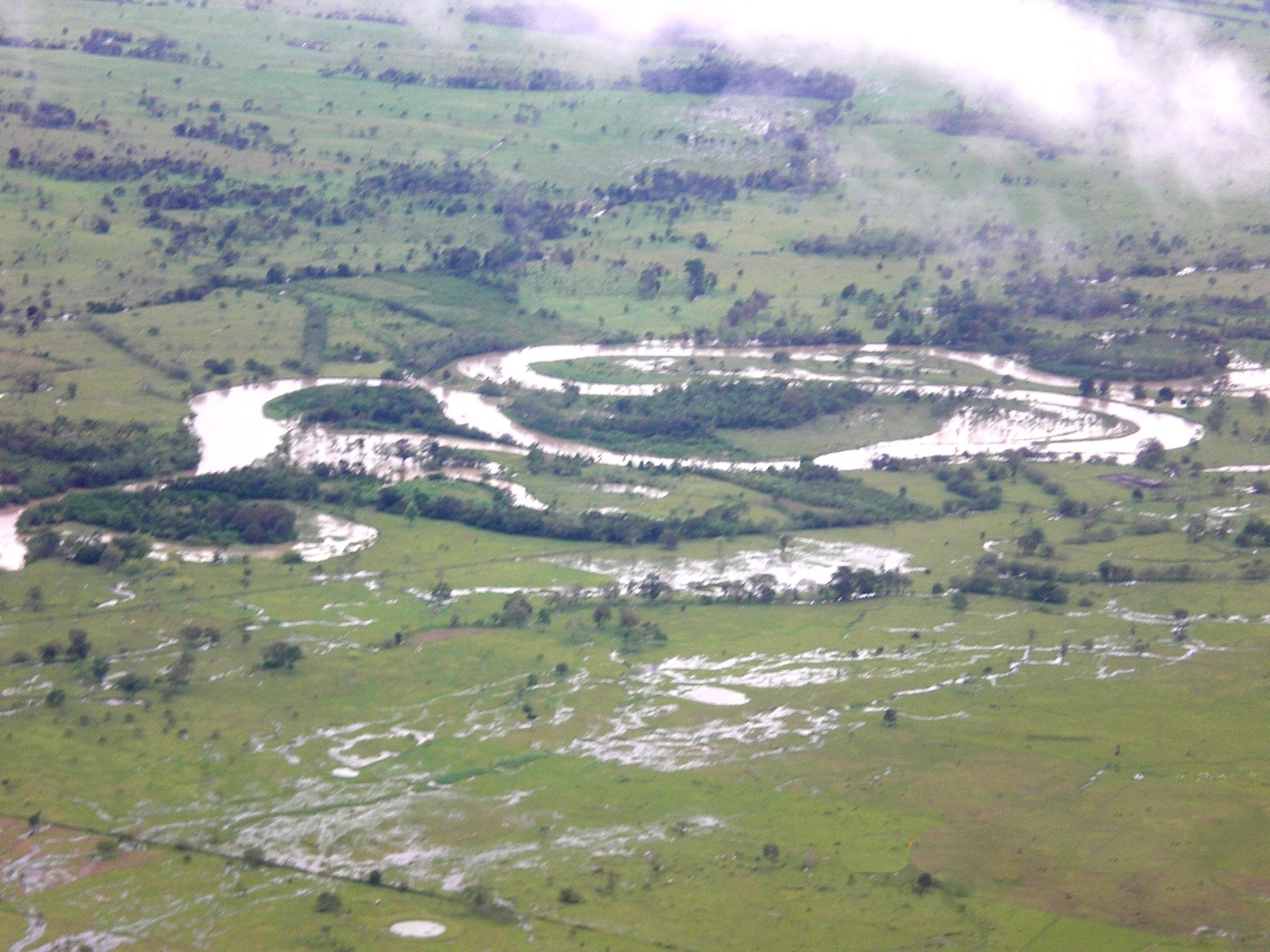
The Atrato River.

The cold or cool zone constitutes about 6% of the total area, including some of the most densely populated plateaus and terraces of the Colombian Andes; this zone supports about one fourth of the country's total population. The mean temperature ranges between 10 and 19 °C (50.0 and 66.2 °F), and the wet seasons occur in April and May and from September to December, as in the high elevations of the temperate zone.

Precipitation is moderate to heavy in most parts of the country; the heavier rainfall occurs in the low-lying hot zone. Considerable variations occur because of local conditions that affect wind currents, however, and areas on the leeward side of the Guajira Peninsula receive generally light rainfall; the annual rainfall of 350 millimeters (13.8 in) recorded at the Uribia station there is the lowest in Colombia. Considerable year-to-year variations have been recorded, and Colombia sometimes experiences droughts.

Colombia's geographic and climatic variations have combined to produce relatively well-defined "ethnocultural" groups among different regions of the country: the Costeño from the Caribbean coast; the Caucano in the Cauca region and the Pacific coast; the Antioqueño in Antioquia, Caldas, Risaralda, and Valle del Cauca departments; the Tolimense in Tolima and Huila departments; the Cundiboyacense in the interior departments of Cundinamarca and Boyacá in the Cordillera Oriental; the Santandereano in Norte de Santander and Santander departments; and the Llanero in the eastern plains. Each group has distinctive characteristics, accents, customs, social patterns, and forms of cultural adaptation to climate and topography that differentiates it from other groups. Even with rapid urbanization and modernization, regionalism and regional identification continued to be important reference points, although they were somewhat less prominent in the 1980s than in the nineteenth and early twentieth centuries.

Colombia's proximity to the equator influences its climates. The lowland areas are continuously hot. Altitude affects temperature greatly. Temperatures decrease about 3.5 °F (1.9 °C) for every 1,000-foot (305 m) increase in altitude above sea level. Rainfall varies by location in Colombia, tending to increase as one travels southward. This is especially true in the eastern lowlands. For example, rainfall in parts of the Guajira Peninsula seldom exceeds 30 in (762 mm) per year. Colombia's rainy southeast, however, is often drenched by more than 200 in (5,080 mm) of rain per year. Rainfall in most of the rest of the country runs between these two extremes.

== Vegetation ==
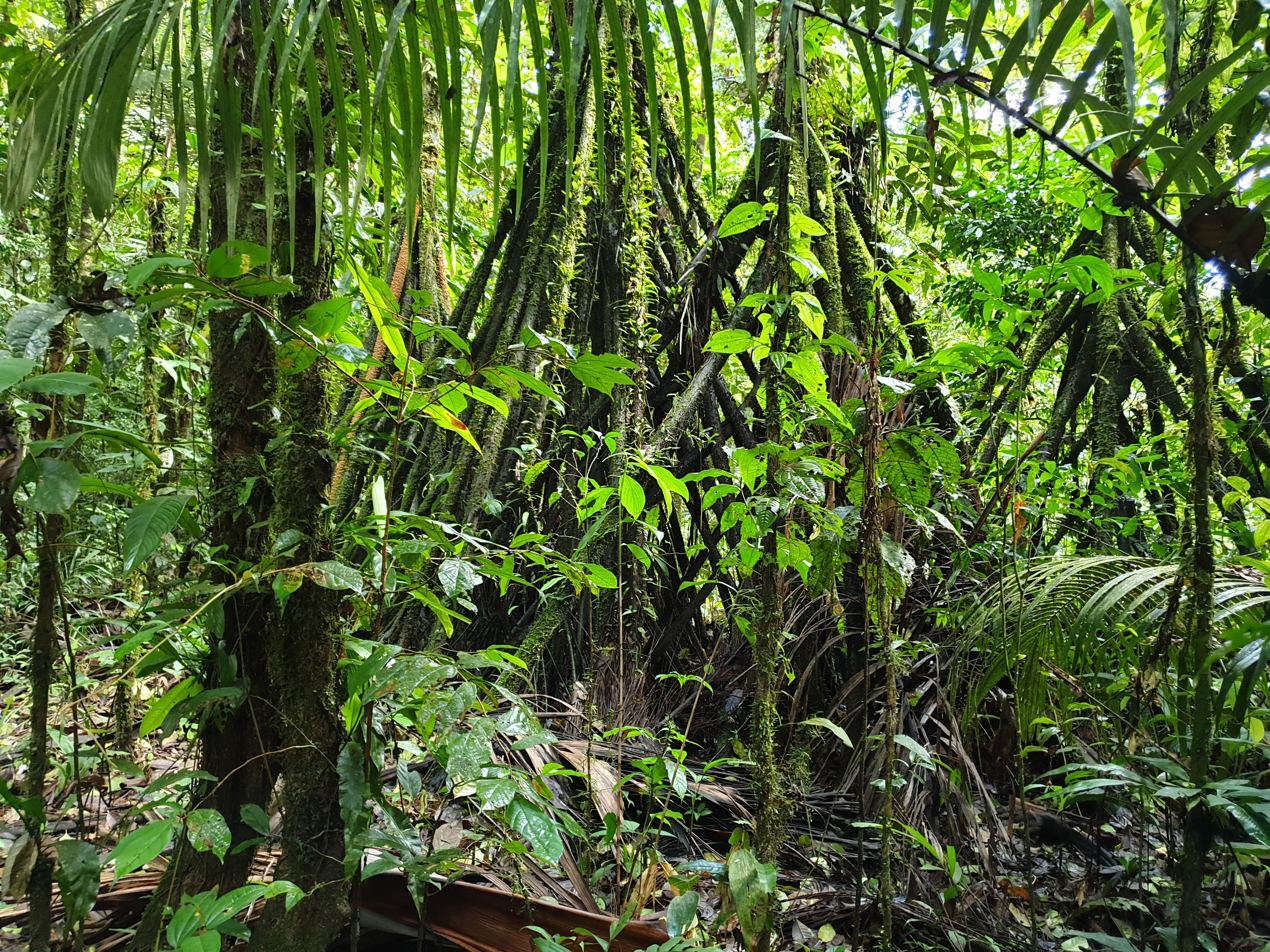
Amazon rainforest in Colombia

Altitude affects not only temperature, but also vegetation. In fact, altitude is one of the most important influences on vegetation patterns in Colombia. The mountainous parts of the country can be divided into several vegetation zones according to altitude, although the altitude limits of each zone may vary somewhat depending on the latitude.

The "tierra caliente" (hot land), below 1,000 m (3,300 ft), is the zone of tropical crops such as bananas. The tierra templada (temperate land), extending from an altitude of 1,000 to 2,000 m (3,300 to 6,600 ft), is the zone of coffee and maize. Wheat and potatoes dominate in the "tierra fría" (cold land), at altitudes from 2,000 to 3,200 m (6,600 to 10,500 ft). In the "zona forestada" (forested zone), which is located between 3,200 and 4,000 m (10,500 and 13,100 ft), many of the trees have been cut for firewood. Treeless pastures dominate the páramos, or alpine grasslands, at altitudes of 4,000 to 4,500 m (13,100 to 14,800 ft). Above 4,500 m (14,800 ft), where temperatures are below freezing, is the "tierra helada", a zone of permanent snow and ice.

Vegetation also responds to rainfall patterns. A scrub woodland of scattered trees and bushes dominates the semiarid northeast. To the south, savannah (tropical grassland) vegetation covers the Colombian portion of the llanos. The rainy areas in the southeast are blanketed by tropical rainforest. In the mountains, the spotty patterns of precipitation in alpine areas complicate vegetation patterns. The rainy side of a mountain may be lush and green, while the other side, in the rain shadow, may be parched.

== Relief ==
Relief map of Colombia

The Andean range is located in Colombia from the southwest (Ecuador border) toward the northeast (Venezuela border) and is divided in the Colombian Massif (Macizo Colombiano) in three ranges (East Andes, Central Andes and West Andes) that form two long valleys, Magdalena and Cauca follow by the rivers of the same name.

The eastern half of Colombia, comprising more than half its territory, is plain and composed by savanna and rainforest, crossed by rivers belonging to the Amazon and Orinoco basins. The northern part, called the Llanos, is a savanna region, mostly in the Orinoco basin (therefore called also Orinoquía). The southern part is covered by the Amazon rain forest and belongs mostly to the Amazon basin. It is usually called Amazonía.

At the north and west of the Andes range there are some coastal plains. The Caribbean plains at the north and the Pacific plains at the west.

A recent global remote sensing analysis suggested that there were 553km² of tidal flats in Colombia, making it the 46th ranked country in terms of tidal flat area.

Colombian Pacific Plains are among the most rainy parts in the world, chiefly at the north (Chocó).

The highest mountain in Colombia is not in the Andes but in the Caribbean plain: Sierra Nevada de Santa Marta with its highest points named Pico Cristobal Colon (5775 m) and Pico Simon Bolivar (same elevation). Other mountains in the Caribbean plain include the Montes de María and the Serranía de San Lucas.

In the Pacific Plains there are other mountain formations, chiefly the Serranía del Darién and the Serranía del Baudó.

In the eastern Region, there is the Serranía de la Macarena and there are formations belonging to the Guyana Shield.

== Protected areas ==
National natural parks of Colombia.

== Natural resources ==
The natural resources of Colombia are varied and extensive with most of its territory and oceans still unexplored. Colombia has one of the largest open pit coal mines in the world in the region of Cerrejon in the Guajira Peninsula. It also has oil rigs and natural gas extraction in the eastern plains. Colombia is the main producer of emeralds and an important participant in gold, silver, iron, salt, platinum, petroleum, nickel, copper, hydropower and uranium extraction.

== Environmental issues ==
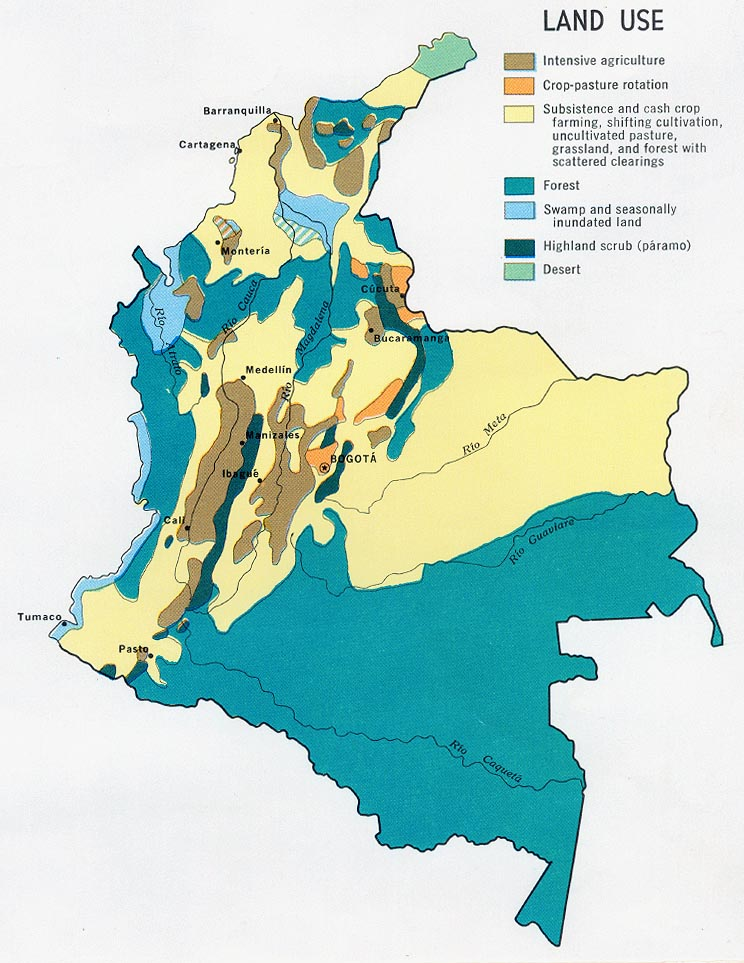
Land use map of Colombia, 1970.

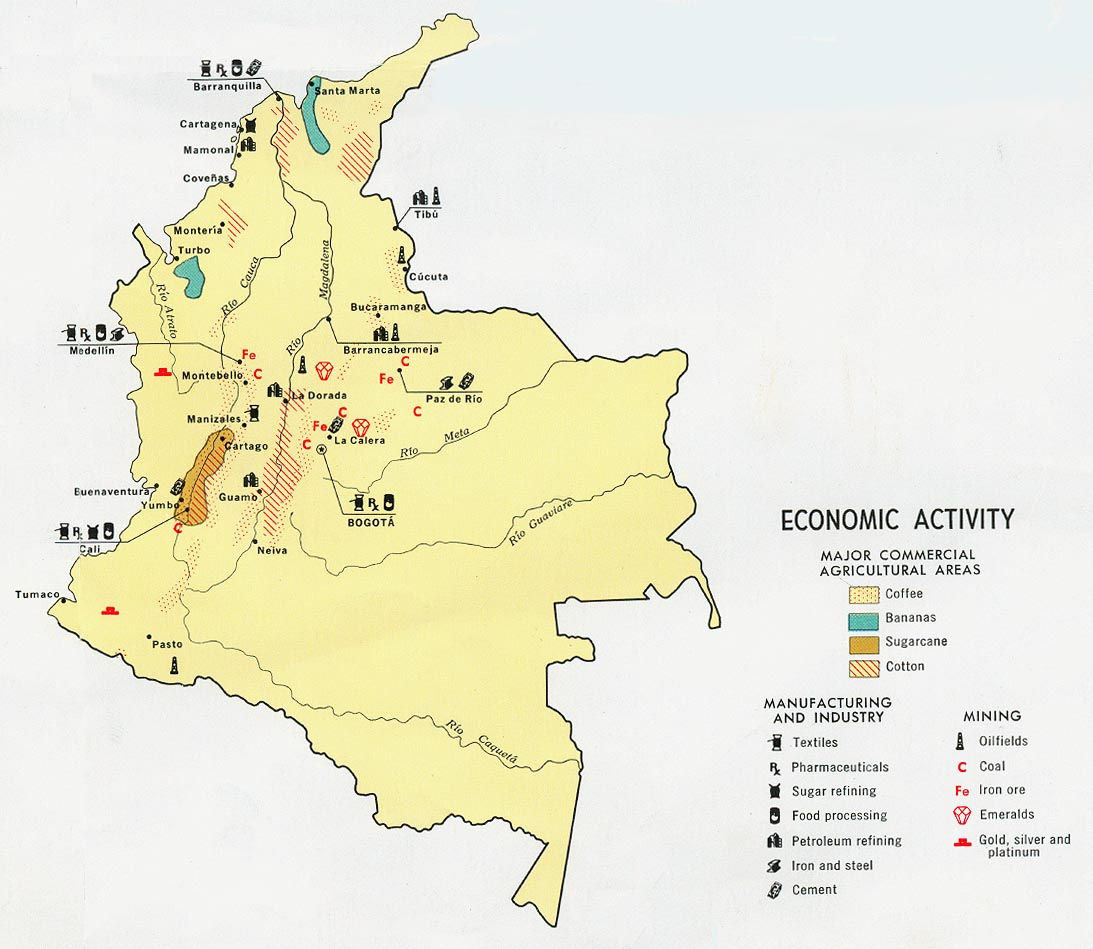
Economic activity map of Colombia, 1970.

The main environmental issues affecting Colombia are deforestation; soil and water quality damage from overuse of pesticides; air pollution, especially in Bogota, from vehicle emissions and other main cities. The collateral damaged produced by attacks against oil pipeline infrastructure by rebel guerrillas in the Colombian armed conflict has produced long term damage to the environment. The armed groups also deforest large areas to cultivate illegal crops and open unauthorized highways in protected areas.

== Extreme points ==
Highest points

Snowfields and glaciers in Colombia are limited to the highest peaks and ranges in the Cordillera Central and Cordillera Oriental and above the 4,700-metre (15,400 ft) elevation on the Sierra Nevada de Santa Marta. The total area of snowfields and glaciers was estimated to be about 104 square kilometers in the early 1970s.

Historical, geographical, and pictorial records point toward a consistent and progressive depletion of ice-and-snow masses in the Colombian Andes since the end of the "Little Ice Age" in the late 1800s. Many glaciers have disappeared during the 20th century, and others are expected to disappear in the coming decades.

== Facts ==
Land size: total: 1,138,910 km^{2} (439,740 mi^{2})

Land boundaries: total: 6,672 km

Coastline: 3,208 km (Caribbean Sea 1,760 km, North Pacific Ocean 1,448 km)

Exclusive Economic Zone: total: 808,158 km^{2} (312,032 mi^{2})

Climate: tropical along coast and eastern plains; cooler in highlands

Terrain: flat coastal lowlands, central highlands, high Andes Mountains, eastern lowland plains

Elevation extremes: lowest point: Pacific Ocean 0 m highest point: Pico Cristobal Colon 5,975 m note: nearby Pico Simon Bolivar also has the same elevation

Natural resources: petroleum, natural gas, coal, iron ore, nickel, gold, copper, emeralds, hydropower

Land use: arable land: 1.43% permanent crops: 1.68% other: 96.89% (2012)

Irrigated land: 10,870 km^{2} (2011)

Total renewable water resources: 2,132 km^{3} (2011)

Freshwater withdrawal (domestic/industrial/agricultural): total: 12.65 km^{3} (55%/4%/41%) per capita: 308 m^{3}/yr (2010)

Natural hazards: highlands subject to volcanic eruptions; occasional earthquakes; periodic droughts

Environment - international agreements: party to: Antarctic Treaty, Biodiversity, Climate change, Climate Change-Kyoto Protocol, Desertification, Endangered Species, Hazardous Wastes, Marine Life Conservation, Ozone Layer Protection, Ship Pollution, Tropical Timber 83, Tropical Timber 94, Wetlands signed, but not ratified: Law of the Sea

== Hydrology ==
Colombia has four main drainage systems: the Pacific drain, the Caribbean drain, the Orinoco Basin and the Amazon Basin.

The Orinoco and Amazon Rivers mark limits with Colombia to Venezuela and Peru respectively.

Caribbean Drain	Pacific Drain	Orinoco Basin	Amazon Basin
=== Rivers confined to Colombia ===
Atrato; Cauca; Magdalena; Nechí; Sinú	Baudó; Patía; San Juan	Guaviare; Inírida; Meta; Vichada	Apaporis; Caguán
=== Rivers originating in Colombia ===
Catatumbo		Arauca	Caquetá; Guainía; Putumayo River; Vaupés

=== Lakes ===
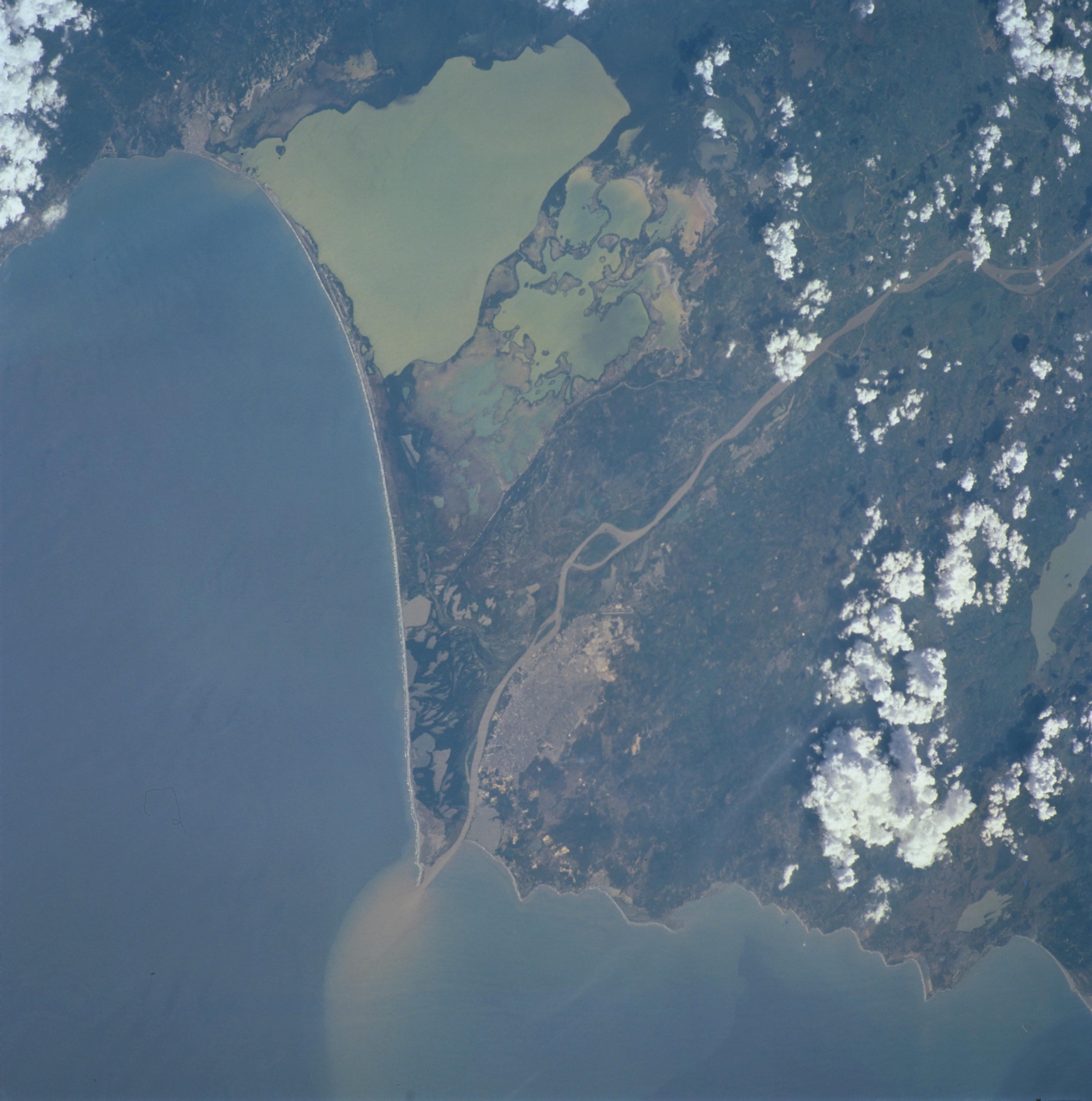
The mouth of the Magdalena River and the Ciénaga Grande de Santa Marta.

- Ciénaga Grande de Santa Marta
- La Cocha Lagoon
- Lake Tota

== See also ==
- Valleys and Plateaus of Colombia
- Environmental issues in Colombia
