= List of islands of South America =

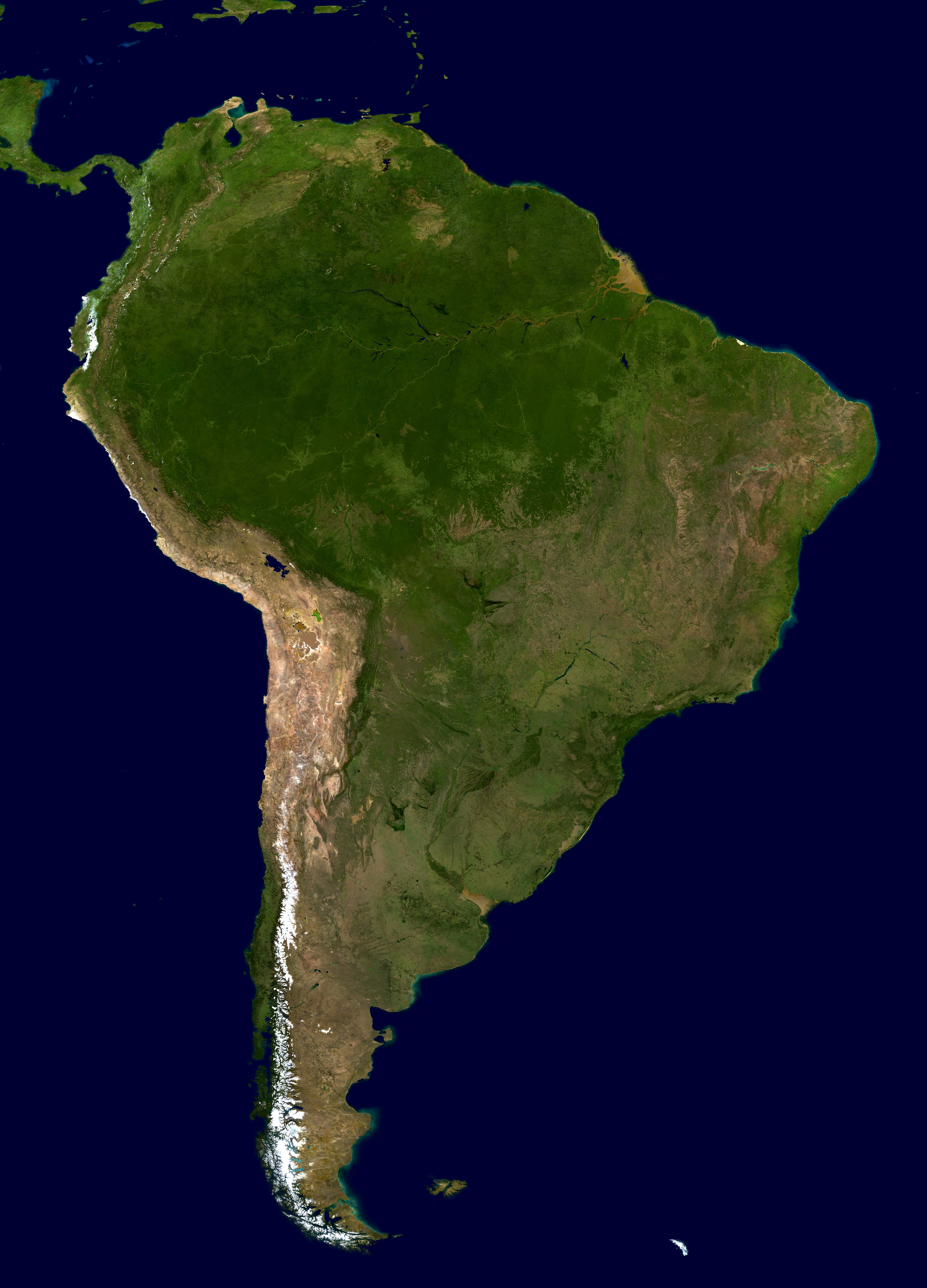
A composite satellite photograph of South America in orthographic projection

The following are lists of the islands of South America by country.

Over 500
Country	Island	Pop	Year	Division	Area
	Chiloé	148,173		Los Lagos	
	Calbuco	9,583		Los Lagos	
	Quinchao	8,563		Los Lagos	
	Teja	5,505		Los Ríos	
	Lemuy	3,921		Los Lagos	
	Puluqui	2,566		Los Lagos	
	Quihua	1,780		Los Lagos	
	Ascención	1,467		Aysén	
Chile	Quiriquina	1,347	2017	Biobío	
	Santa María	1,260		Biobío	
	Tenglo	1,078		Los Lagos	
	Huar	1,021		Los Lagos	
	maillen	952		Los Lagos	
	Quehui	699		Los Lagos	
	Apiao	621		Los Lagos	
	Meulín	595		Los Lagos	
	Isla del Rey	551		Los Ríos	
	Butachauques	506		Los Lagos	

== Argentina ==
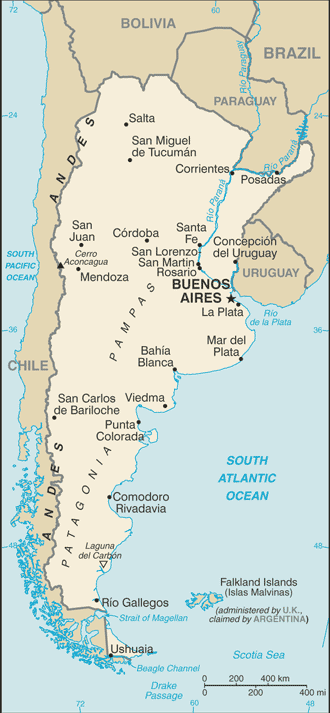
A map of Argentina

=== Atlantic Ocean islands ===
- Isla Apipé
- Isla Bermejo
- Isla de los Estados
- Isla de San Martín
- Isla del Cerrito
- Isla Martín García
- Isla Trinidad (Buenos Aires)
- Patagonic Archipelago
  - Archipiélago de Tierra del Fuego
    - Isla Grande de Tierra del Fuego (divided with Chile)
    - Isla de los Estados

=== Lake islands ===
- Isla Huemul
- Isla Victoria

=== River islands ===
- Islands of the Paraná River delta
  - Islas del Ibicuy

== Bolivia ==
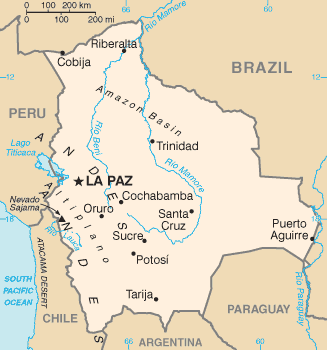
A map of Bolivia

Bolivia is a landlocked country with no ocean islands.

=== Lake islands ===
- Isla del Pescado (Incahuasi Island)
- Isla del Sol
- Isla de la Luna

== Brazil ==
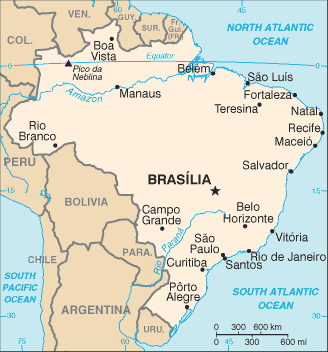
A map of Brazil

=== Atlantic Ocean islands ===
- Arquipelago de Fernando de Noronha
- Arquipélago de São Pedro e São Paulo (Saint Peter and Paul Rocks)
- Atol das Rocas (Rocas Atoll)
- Ilha de Boipeba
- Ilha de Maraca
- Ilha da Queimada Grande
- Ilha de Santa Bárbara
- Ilha de Santa Catarina
- Ilha de Santo Amaro
- Ilha de São Luís
- Ilha Grande
- Ilha Itaparica
- Ilha Tinhare
- Ilha Trindade
- Ilha dos Lobos
- Ilhabela archipelago
  - Ilha de São Sebastião
- Ilhas Cagarras archipelago
- Ilhas Martim Vaz archipelago
- Vitória archipelago
  - Ilha de Vitória

=== River Islands ===
- Bananal Island
- Anavilhanas Archipelago

=== Fluvial-maritime ===
- Marajó Archipelago
  - Ilha de Marajó

== Chile ==
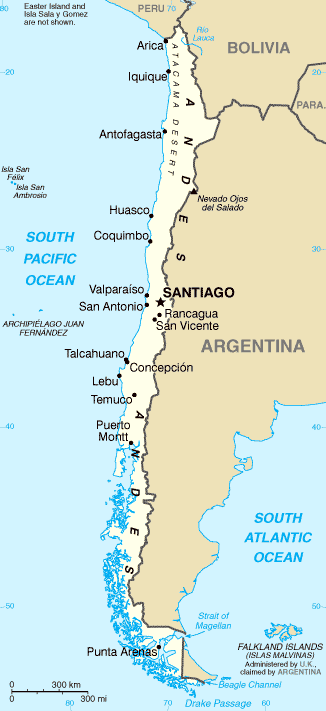
A map of Chile

=== Pacific Ocean islands ===
- Archipiélago de Chiloé
  - Isla de Chiloé
  - Isla Guafo
  - Isla Lemuy
  - Isla Quinchao
- Archipiélago de las Guaitecas
- Archipiélago Guayaneco
- Archipiélago Juan Fernández (also considered part of Oceania)
  - Isla Alejandro Selkirk
  - Isla Robinsón Crusoe
  - Isla Santa Clara
  - Islote Juananga
- Isla Chañaral
- Isla de Pascua (Easter Island) (also considered part of Oceania)
- Isla del Rey
- Isla Magdalena
- Isla Mancera
- Isla Mocha
- Isla Quiriquina
- Isla Salas y Gómez
- Islas Desventuradas
  - Isla San Ambrosio
  - Isla San Félix
  - Islote González
  - Roca Catedral
- Merino Jarpa Island
- Patagonic Archipelago
  - Archipelago de La Reina Adelaida (Queen Adelaide Archipelago)
    - Isla Cochrane
    - Isla Contreras
    - Isla Juan Guillermo
    - Isla Pacheco
    - Isla Ramirez
    - North Rennell Island
    - South Rennell Island
  - Archipiélago de los Chonos
    - Isla Benjamin
    - Isla Cuptana
    - Isla Guamblin
    - Isla James
    - Isla Melchor
    - Isla Rivero
    - Isla Simpson
    - Isla Traiguen
    - Isla Victoria
  - Archipiélago de Tierra del Fuego
    - Isla Dawson
    - Isla Desolación
    - Isla Gordon
    - Isla Grande de Tierra del Fuego (divided with Argentina)
    - Isla Magdalena
    - Islas Hermite
      - Isla Hermite
      - Isla Hornos – location of Cape Horn (Cabo de Hornos)
    - Isla Hoste
    - Isla Navarino
    - Isla Santa Inés
    - Islas Picton, Lennox y Nueva
    - Islas Wollaston
    - Londonderry Island
  - Isla Angamos
  - Isla Aracena
  - Isla Campana
  - Isla Chatham
  - Isla Clarence
  - Isla Diego de Almagro
  - Isla Duque de York
  - Isla Esmeralda
  - Isla Farrel
  - Isla Guarello
  - Isla Hanover
  - Isla Jorge Montt
  - Isla Juan Guillermos
  - Isla Madre de Dios
  - Isla Manuel Rodriguez
  - Isla Mornington
  - Isla Patricio Lynch
  - Isla Pratt
  - Isla Riesco
  - Isla Serrano
  - Isla Stosch
  - Isla Wellington
  - Islas Diego Ramírez
    - Islote Águila (Águila Islet) – southernmost point of Chile
  - Islas Ildefonso

=== Lake islands ===
- Isla Gabriela
- Isla Guapi
- Isla Fresia
- Isla Central

=== River islands ===
- Isla Teja
- Isla del Rey
- Isla Mancera
- Isla Haverbeck
- Isla Mota
- Isla Guapi
- Isla Lemuy
- Isla Orrego

== Colombia ==
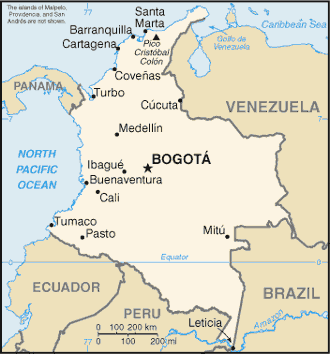
A map of Colombia

=== Caribbean Sea islands ===
Bolívar Department:

- Rosario Islands
  - Isla Grande
  - Isla Marina
  - Isla de Roberto
  - Isla Rosario
  - Isla del Tesoro
- Fuerte Island
- Tierra Bomba Island
- Isla del Pirata

Córdoba Department:

- Tortuguilla Island

Magdalena Department:

- Isla de Salamanca

San Andrés and Providencia Department:

- Acuario Cay (also known as Rose Cay)
- Alice Shoal
- Bajo Nuevo Bank
- Bayley Islet
- Basalt Islet
- Brothers Cay
- Crab Cay
- Cayos de Albuquerque
  - North Cay
  - South Cay
- Córdoba Cay (also known as Haynes Cay)
- Easy Cay
- Grunt Cay
- Cayos de Este Sudeste
  - Bolívar Cay (also known as Courtown or West Cay)
  - East Cay
- Palm Cay
- Providencia Island
- Quita Sueño Bank
- Rocky Cay
- Roncador Bank
- Roncador Cay
- San Andrés Island
- Santa Catalina Island
- Santander Cay (also known as Cotton Cay)
- Serrana Bank
- Serranilla Bank
- Sucre Islet (also known as Johnny Cay)

Sucre Department:

- Boquerón Island
- Cabruna Island
- Ceycén Island
- Mangle Island
- Maravilla Island
- Múcura Island
- Palma Island
- Panda Island
- Santa Cruz del Islote
- Tintipán Island

=== Pacific Ocean islands ===
Cauca Department:

- Coco Island
- Gorgona Island
  - El Horno Islet
- Gorgonilla Island
  - El Viudo Islet
- Micay Island

Chocó Department:

- Cacagual Island

Nariño Department:

- Bocagrande Island
- El Bajito Island
- El Gallo Island
- El Morro Island
- La Viciosa Island
- Sanquianga Island
- Tumaco Island

Valle del Cauca Department:

- Ají Island
- La Palma Island
- Cascajal Island
- Malpelo Island

=== Lake islands ===
Boyacá Department:

- Lake Tota
  - Cerro Chiquito Island
  - Santa Helena Island
  - San Pedro Island

Nariño Department:

- La Cocha Lake
  - La Corota Island

=== River islands ===
Amazonas Department:

- Baranoa Island
- Curvaratá Island
- Loreto Island
- Porvenir Island
- Tigre Island
- Yaguas Muñoz Island

Antioquia Department:

- Pernambuco Island

Bolívar Department:

- Margarita Island
- Tigrera Island
- Venezuela Island

Caquetá Department:

- Aduché Island

Chocó Department:

- Grande del Atrato Island

Magdalena Department:

- Zura Island

Santander Department:

- Grande Island

Vichada Department:

- Aceitico Island
- Manatí Island

== Ecuador ==
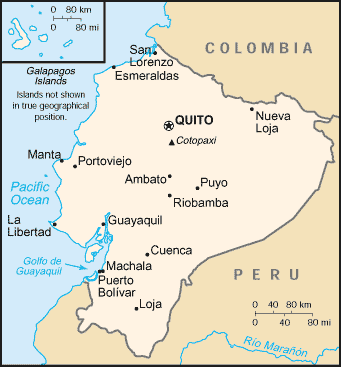
A map of Ecuador

=== Pacific Ocean islands ===
- Galápagos Islands
  - Bartolomé Island
  - Baltra Island
  - Darwin Island
  - Española Island
  - Fernandina Island
  - Floreana Island
  - Genovesa Island
  - Isabela Island
  - Marchena Island
  - Rábida Island
  - Pinzón Island
  - Santa Fe Island
  - Santa Cruz Island
  - Santiago Island
  - Wolf Island
- La Plata Island
- Puná Island
- Salango Island
- Santa Clara Island(Ecuador)

=== Lake Islands ===
- Cuicocha Lake
  - Teodoro Wolf Island
  - Yerovi Island

== Falkland Islands ==
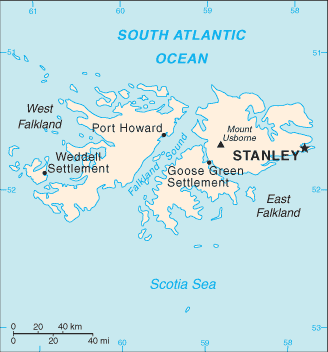
A map of the Falkland Islands

=== Atlantic Ocean islands ===
- Falkland Islands (also claimed by Argentina)
  - West Falkland
  - East Falkland
  - Jason Islands

== French Guiana ==
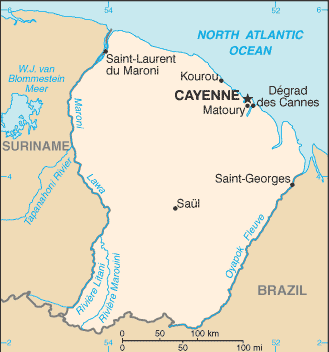
A map of French Guiana

- Îles du Salut
  - Île du Diable
  - Île Royale
  - Île Saint-Joseph
- Constable Islands
- Remire Islands
  - Îlet la Mère
- Palasisi, island in the Litani River
- Île Portal, island in the Maroni River

== Guyana ==
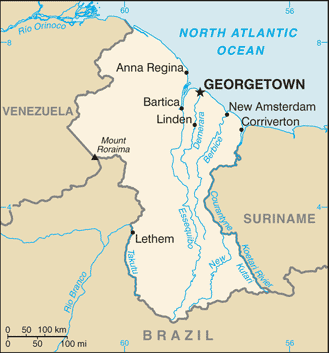
A map of Guyana

== Paraguay ==
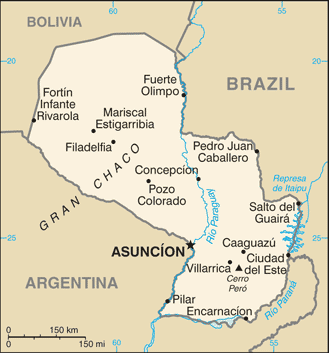
A map of Paraguay

Paraguay is a landlocked country with no ocean islands and only a few very small inland islands.

=== River islands ===
- Yacyretá Island
- Isla del Gato
- Isla Anegadizo
- Isla Piquete Kamba
- Isla Stanley
- Isla Pinasco N°1
- Isla Pinasco N°2
- Isla Pinasco N°3
- Isla Ka'apuku Guasu
- Isla Ka'apukumi
- Isla de Los Puertos
- Isla Peña Hermosa
- Isla Dalmatia
- Isla San Roque
- Isla del Faro
- Many other small islands in the Paraguay River.

== Peru ==
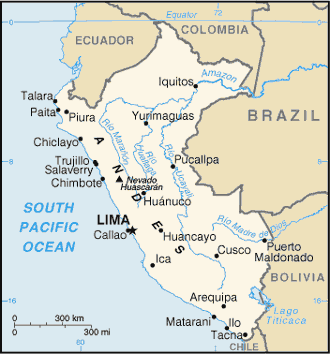
A map of Peru

== South Georgia and the South Sandwich Islands ==
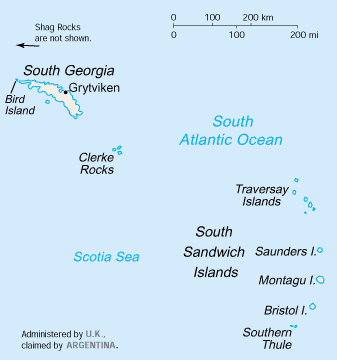
A map of South Georgia and the South Sandwich Islands

=== Atlantic Ocean islands ===
- South Georgia (also claimed by Argentina)
  - Bird Island, South Georgia
- South Sandwich Islands (also claimed by Argentina)

== Suriname ==
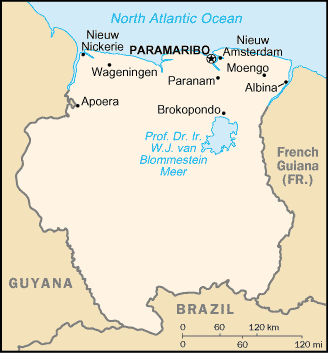
A map of Suriname

- Diitabiki
- Kasuela
- Kwana Island
- Langatabiki
- Lensidede
- Lokaloka
- Manlobi
- Moitaki
- Nason
- Stoelmanseiland
- Stoneiland
- Zoewatta

== Uruguay ==
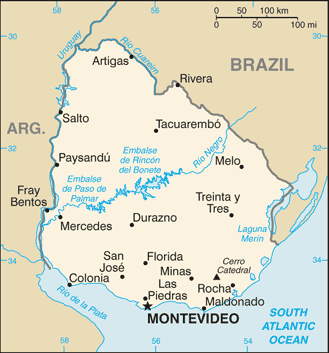
A map of Uruguay

- Brazilian Island
- Gorriti Island
- Juncal Island
- Isla de Flores
- Isla de las Gaviotas
- Isla de Lobos
- Timoteo Domínguez Island
- Vizcaíno Island

== Venezuela ==
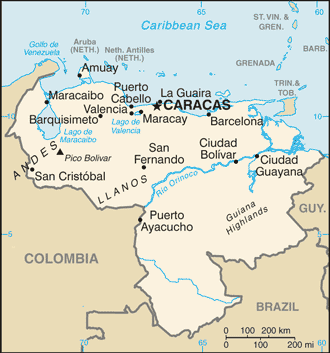
A map of Venezuela

=== Caribbean Sea islands ===
- Archipiélago Las Aves
  - Isla La Blanquilla
- Archipiélago Los Monjes
- Archipiélago Los Roques
- Isla de Aves
- Isla de Coche
- Isla de Cubagua
- Isla de Patos
- Isla de Toas
- Isla de Zapara
- Isla La Orchila
- Isla La Sola
- Isla La Tortuga
- Isla Margarita
- Isla San Carlos
- Islas Caracas
- Islas los Frailes
- Islas los Hermanos
- Islas los Testigos

=== River islands ===
- Ankoko Island (also claimed by Guyana)

== See also ==
- List of islands by area
- List of islands by highest point
- List of islands by population
- List of islands in lakes
- List of river islands
- List of islands in the Atlantic Ocean
- List of Caribbean islands
- List of islands in the Pacific Ocean
- Topic outline of South America
