= Cabruna Island =

Coral island in the Caribbean Sea

Coordinates: 9°44′33″N 75°41′03″W

External videos
- Erosion on Cabruna Island from UNITAS operations carried out by Colombia and the United States in 1963

Cabruna Island (Isla Cabruna) is a coral island located in the Archipelago of San Bernardo, Gulf of Morrosquillo, Caribbean Sea. It is governed by Colombia, and is a part of the Colombian Bolívar Department.

Map of Archipelago of San Bernardo. Isla Cabruna is located in the right of the image.

== See also ==
- Caribbean region of Colombia
- Insular region of Colombia
- List of islands of South America
