= Mangle Island =

Island in the Caribbean Sea, governed by Colombia

Coordinates: 9°45′50″N 75°47′18″W

Mangle Island (Isla Mangle) is a coral island located in the Archipelago of San Bernardo, Gulf of Morrosquillo, Caribbean Sea. It is governed by Colombia, and is a part of the Colombian Bolívar Department.

Map of Archipelago of San Bernardo. Isla Mangle is located in the center of the image.

== See also ==
- Caribbean region of Colombia
- Insular region of Colombia
- List of islands of South America
