= Múcura Island =

Island in the Archipelago of San Bernardo

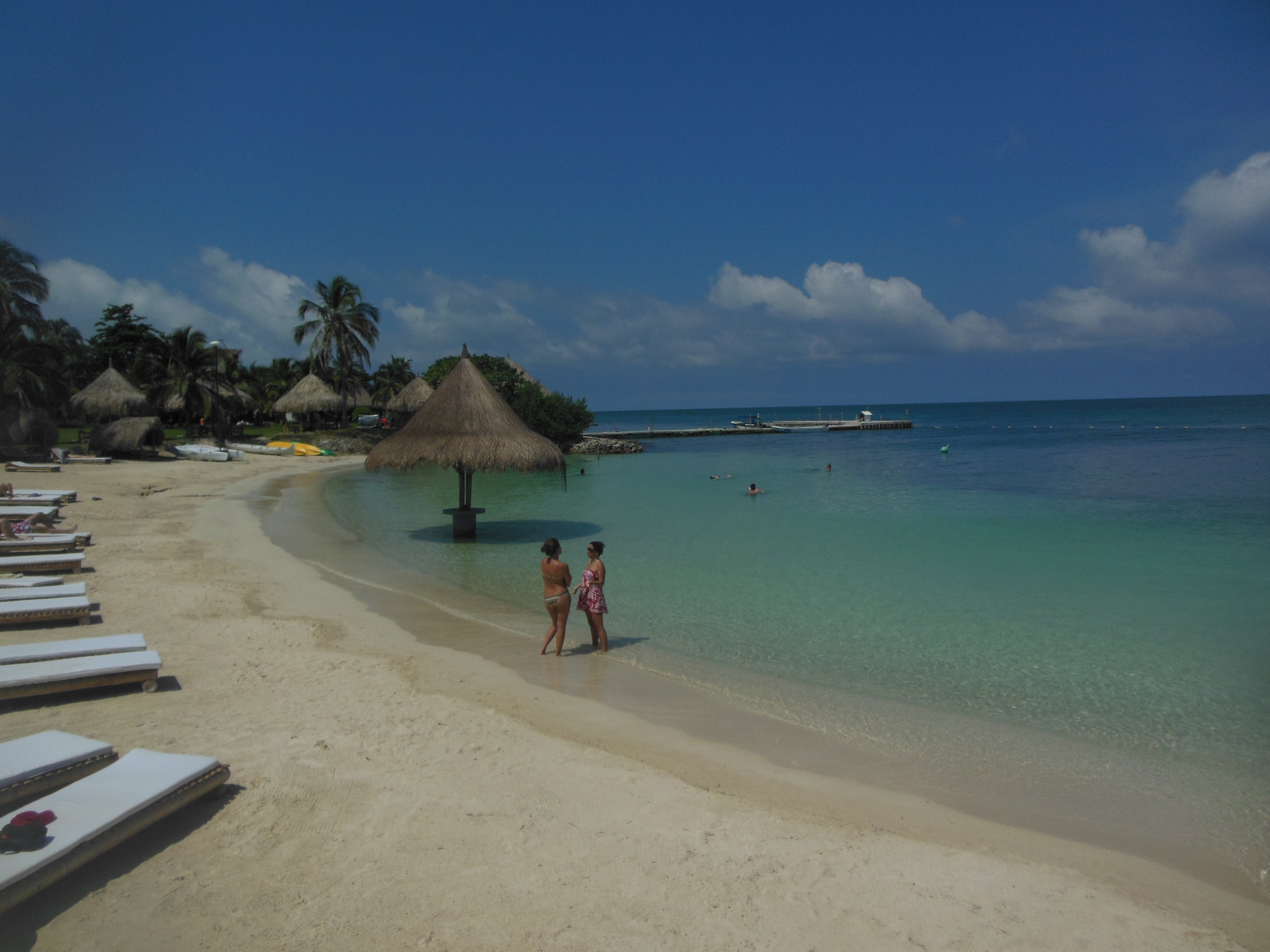
- Beach of Múcura

- Map of Archipelago of San Bernardo. Isla Múcura is located in the upper-left of the image

- Location within Islas de San Bernardo Location within Colombia Location within the Caribbean

Geography
- Coordinates: 9°46′54″N 75°52′21″W
- Archipelago: Archipelago of San Bernardo

Administration
- Colombia

Múcura Island (Isla Múcura) is a coral island located in the Archipelago of San Bernardo, Gulf of Morrosquillo, Caribbean Sea. It is governed by Colombia, and is a part of the District of Cartagena de Indias.

Lodging facilities are present on the island.

== Flora and fauna ==
The island has a significant amount of Mangrove trees.

== See also ==
- Caribbean region of Colombia
- Insular region of Colombia
- List of islands of South America
