= Tintipán Island =

Island in the Caribbean Sea

Native name: Isla Tintipán
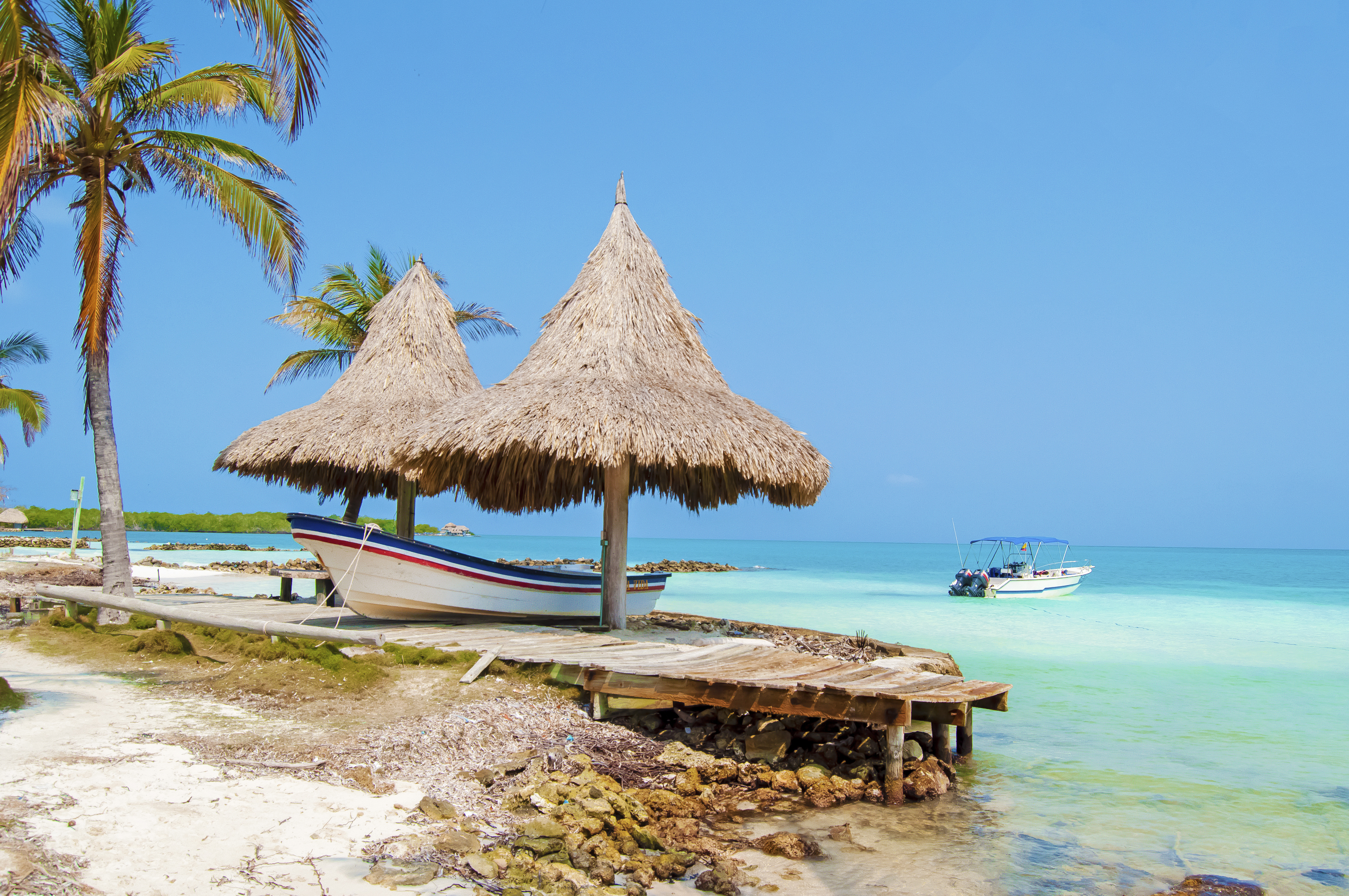
- A beach on Tintipán Island

- Location within Islas de San Bernardo Location within Colombia

Geography
- Location: Caribbean Sea
- Coordinates: 9.794°N 75.842°W
- Archipelago: San Bernardo
- Adjacent to: Gulf of Morrosquillo

Administration
- Colombia
- Department: Bolívar

Demographics
- Languages: Spanish

Tintipán Island (Spanish: Isla Tintipán) is a coral island located in the Archipelago of San Bernardo, Gulf of Morrosquillo, Caribbean Sea. It is governed by Colombia as part of Cartagena de Indias (76km).

== Tourism ==
The island is home to several hotels and hostels. Access to the lodgings are by boat as there are no airports or roads.

== See also ==
- Caribbean region of Colombia
- Insular region of Colombia
- List of islands of South America
