= Palma Island =

Coral island in Colombia

Coordinates: 9.736°N 75.748°W

Palma Island (Isla Palma) is a coral island located in the Archipelago of San Bernardo, Gulf of Morrosquillo, Caribbean Sea. It is governed by Colombia, and is a part of the Colombian Bolívar Department.

Lodging facilities are present on the island.

Map of Archipelago of San Bernardo. Isla Palma is located in the center-right of the image.

== See also ==
- Caribbean region of Colombia
- Insular region of Colombia
- List of islands of South America
