= Ceycén Island =

Coordinates: 9°41′41″N 75°51′16″W

Ceycén Island (Isla Ceycén, sometimes spelled as Ceicén) is a coral island located in the Archipelago of San Bernardo, Gulf of Morrosquillo, Caribbean Sea. It is governed by Colombia, and is a part of the Colombian Bolívar Department.

Ceycén Island has a lighthouse that is 24 m (79 ft) in height.

Map of Archipelago of San Bernardo. Isla Ceycén is located in the lower-left of the image.

== See also ==
- Caribbean region of Colombia
- Insular region of Colombia
- List of islands of South America
