= Boquerón Island =

Boquerón Island (Isla Boquerón) is a coral island located in the Archipelago of San Bernardo, Gulf of Morrosquillo, Caribbean Sea. It is governed by Colombia, and, unlike the other nine islands of the archipelago, is a part of the Colombian Sucre Department.

Map of Archipelago of San Bernardo. Isla Boqureon is located in the bottom-right of the image.

== See also ==
- Caribbean region of Colombia
- Insular region of Colombia
- List of islands of South America
