= Panda Island =

Coordinates: 9°44′40″N 75°49′07″W

Panda Island (Isla Panda) is a coral island located in the Archipelago of San Bernardo, Gulf of Morrosquillo, Caribbean Sea. It is governed by Colombia, and is a part of the Colombian Bolívar Department.

Map of Archipelago of San Bernardo. Isla Panda is located in the left-center of the image.

== See also ==
- Caribbean region of Colombia
- Insular region of Colombia
- List of islands of South America
