= Maravilla Island =

Maravilla Island (Isla Maravilla) is a coral island located in the Archipelago of San Bernardo, Gulf of Morrosquillo, Caribbean Sea. It is governed by Colombia, and is a part of the Colombian Bolívar Department.

Map of Archipelago of San Bernardo. Isla Maravilla is located in the left of the image.

== See also ==
- Caribbean region of Colombia
- Insular region of Colombia
- List of islands of South America
