= Geography of Cesar Department =

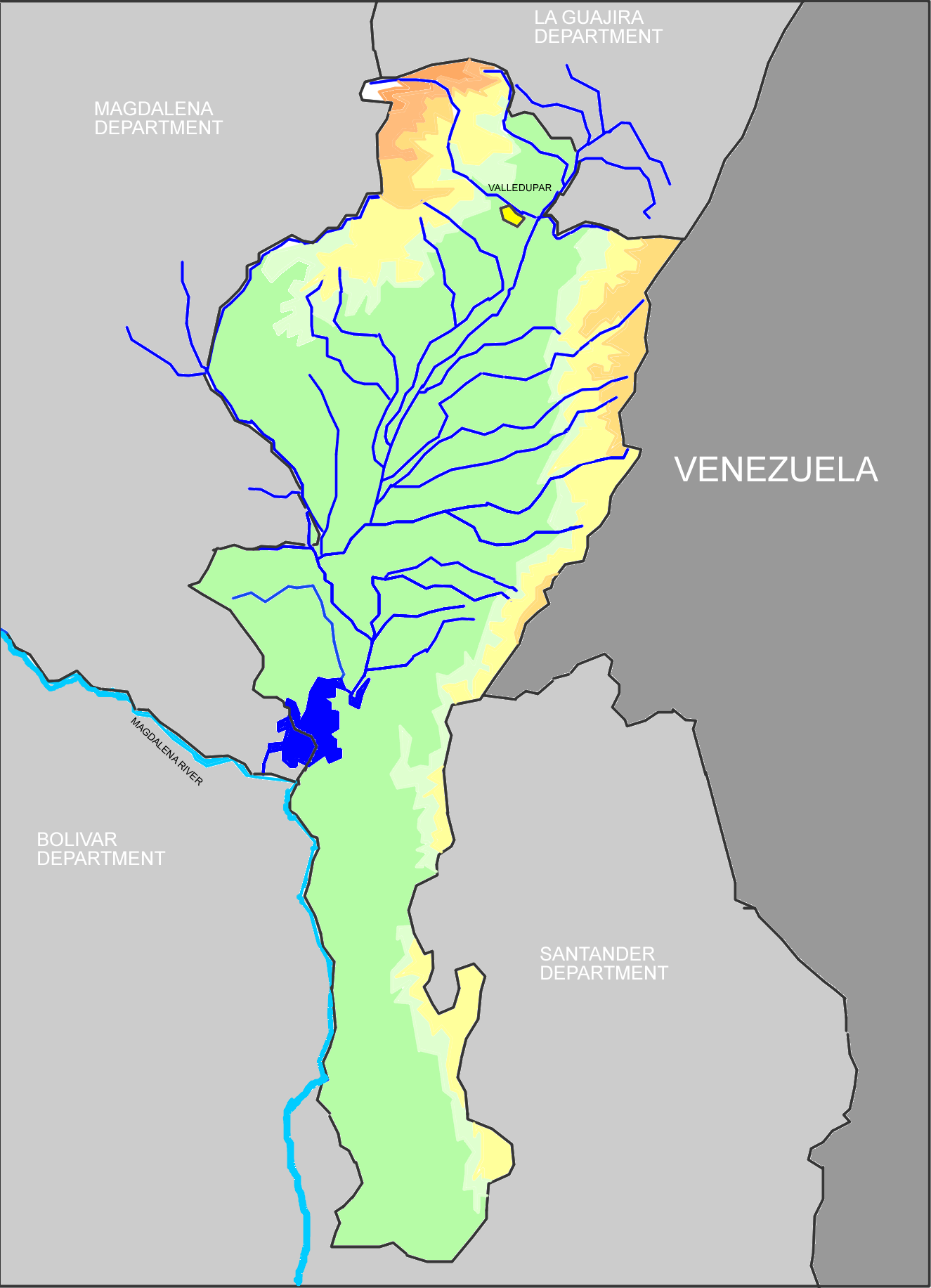
The Cesar River basin in the Department of Cesar.

The Geography of Cesar Department is part of the geography of Colombia, located within the Colombian Caribbean region contiguous to the Caribbean Sea however, the Cesar Department is the only department in the Caribbean region without access border to the sea. The geography of Cesar Department is characterized for being mostly a valley (the department was indeed named after the Valley of Cesar) which is formed by the Sierra Nevada de Santa Marta, the basin of the Cesar River and the Serrania del Perijá, this last one part of the Andes mountain range. To the south the valley ends in the Ciénaga de la Zapatosa contiguous to the Magdalena River and the mountain range of the Serrania de San Lucas, also part of the Andes. The southern Cesar is considered to be part of the Andean Region of Colombia.

== See also ==
- Geography of Colombia
- Caribbean Region of Colombia
