= Insular region of Colombia =

Oceanic islands outside the continental territory

Insular region
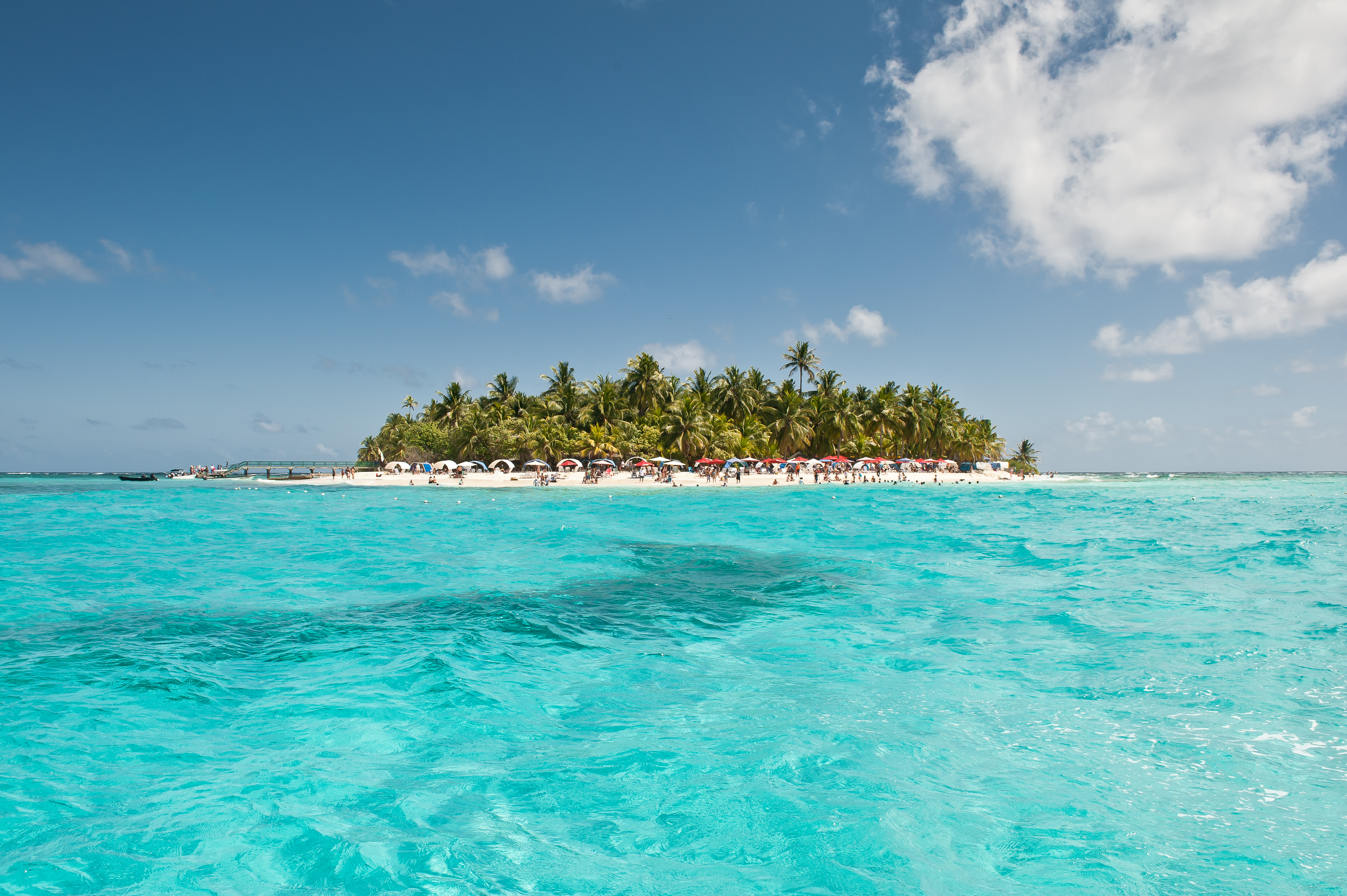
- Tropical monsoon climate in San Andrés (Caribbean island), Colombia.

Ecology
- Realm: Neotropic
- Biome: Marine, Mangroves, Coral Reefs

Geography
- Country: Colombia
- Oceans or seas: Caribbean Sea, Pacific Ocean
- Climate type: Tropical

The insular region of Colombia includes the oceanic islands outside the continental South American territory. In the Caribbean this includes the San Andrés and Providencia islands near Central America and the many coastal islands along mainland Colombia. In the Pacific, it includes Gorgona Island and Malpelo Island.

== Pacific islands ==
- Gorgona Island (Isla Gorgona): 35 km (22 mi) off the coast of Cauca Department, near the town of Guapi
- Gorgonilla Island (Isla Gorgonilla): smaller island next to Gorgona Island
- Malpelo Island (Isla Malpelo): 500 km (310 mi) off the Colombian coast
- Palm Island (Isla Palma): at the mouth of Málaga Bay (Bahía Málaga)

== Caribbean islands ==
Map of the Islands of San Andrés and Providencia

Map of Archipelago of San Bernardo

- San Andrés and Providencia
- Archipiélago de San Bernardo
  - Boquerón Island
  - Cabruna Island
  - Ceycén Island
  - Mangle Island
  - Múcura Island
  - Palma Island
  - Panda Island
  - Santa Cruz del Islote (English: Santa Cruz Islet, an artificial island)
  - Tintipán Island
  - Maravilla Island
- Rosario Islands
- Fuerte Island
- Isla Barú
- Tortuguilla Island
- Tierra Bomba Island

== Protected areas ==
- PNN Uramba Bahía Málaga
- PNN Isla Gorgona
- SFF Malpelo
- PNN Corales del Rosario y San Bernardo
- PNN Old Providence McBean Lagoon

== See also ==
- Caribbean natural region
- Natural regions of Colombia
- Pacific/Chocó natural region
