= Archipelago of San Bernardo =

Group of coastal islands of Colombia in the Caribbean sea

Native name: Islas de San Bernardo
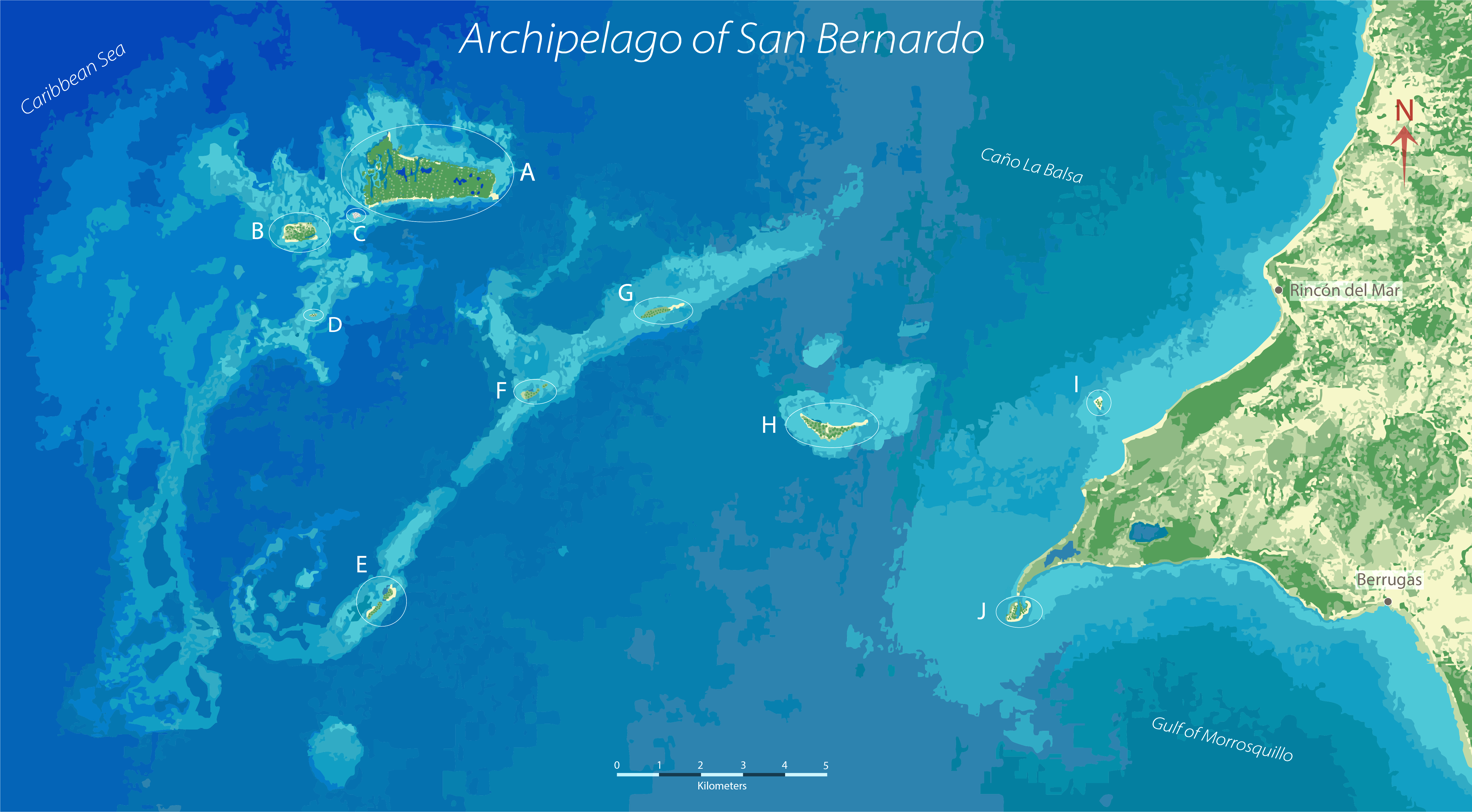
- Map of the San Bernardo archipelago in the Caribbean Sea, off the coast of northern Colombia

- Location within Islas de San Bernardo Location within the Caribbean

Geography
- Location: Caribbean Sea
- Coordinates: 9.7578°N 75.7734°W
- Adjacent to: Gulf of Morrosquillo
- Total islands: 10
- Major islands: Tintipán Island, Múcura Island, Palma Island
- Area: 213 km^{2} (82 sq mi)

Administration
- Colombia
- Department: Bolívar; Sucre (Boquerón Island)

The Archipelago of San Bernardo (Spanish: Archipiélago de San Bernardo, Islas de San Bernardo) is a set of nine coastal coral islands and one artificial island (ten in total) belonging to and governed by Colombia, located in the Gulf of Morrosquillo in the Caribbean Sea, with an approximate area of 213 km^{2}. Administratively, the archipelago belongs to the Bolívar Department, with the exception of Boquerón Island, which belongs to the Sucre Department. It consists of Boquerón Island, Cabruna Island, Ceycén Island, Mangle Island, Múcura Island, Palma Island, Panda Island, Santa Cruz del Islote (English: Santa Cruz Islet, an artificial island), Tintipán Island and Maravilla Island. All the 10 islands are close to the towns of Tolú and Coveñas.

Since 1996, part of the archipelago belongs to the Rosario and San Bernardo Corals National Natural Park.

Lodging facilities are present on some of the islands, primarily Múcura Island and Palma Island.

== Flora and fauna ==
Waters around the islands have fish and turtles, and the islands have significant tropical flora.

== Gallery ==
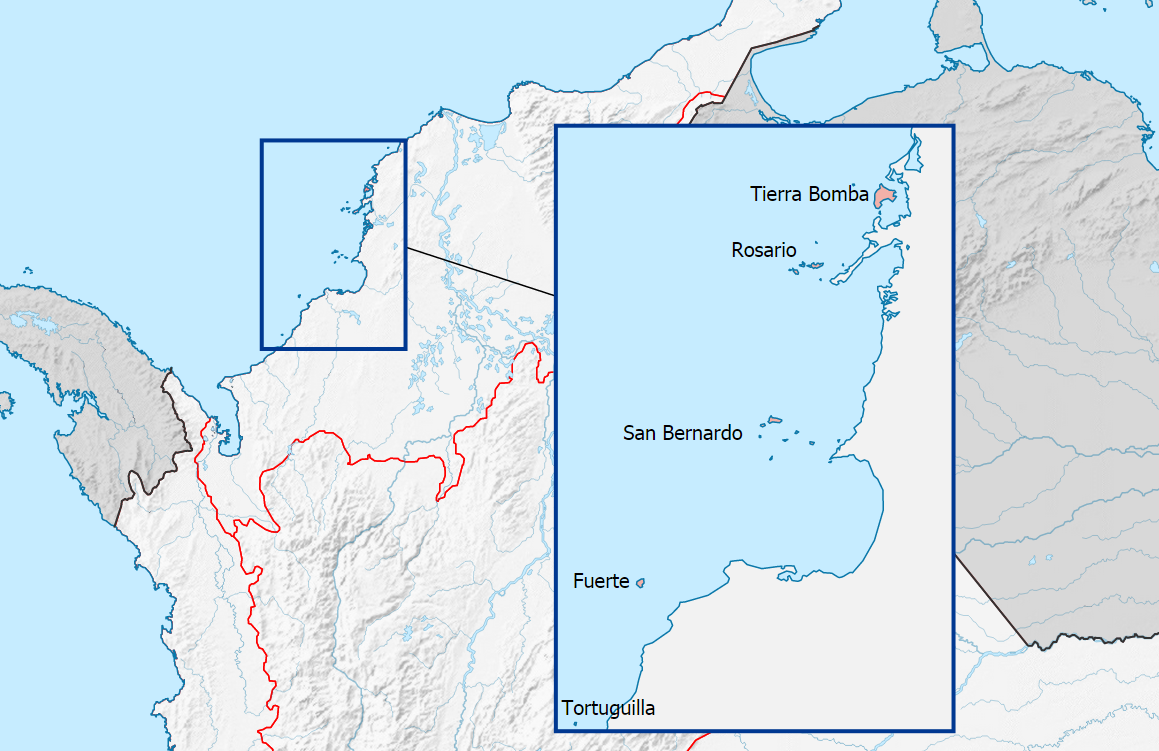
Location of the San Bernardo and Rosario archipelagos in the Caribbean region of Colombia

Sketchmap of the San Bernardo islands

== See also ==
- Caribbean region of Colombia
- Insular region of Colombia
- List of islands of South America
