= Rosario Islands =

Caribbean archipelago off the coast of Colombia

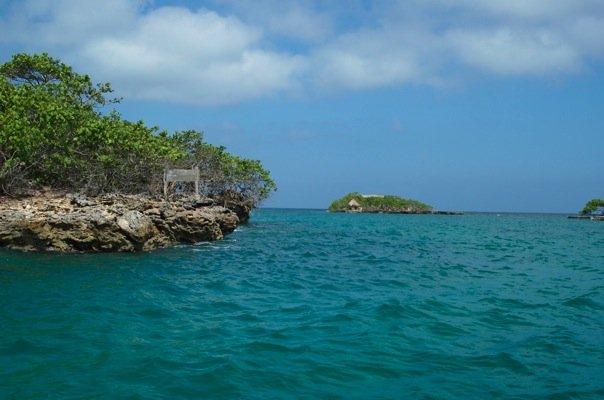

- Location within Islas del Rosario Location within Colombia Location within the Caribbean

Geography
- Coordinates: 10.175°N 75.75°W
- Archipelago: Rosario Islands

Administration
- Colombia

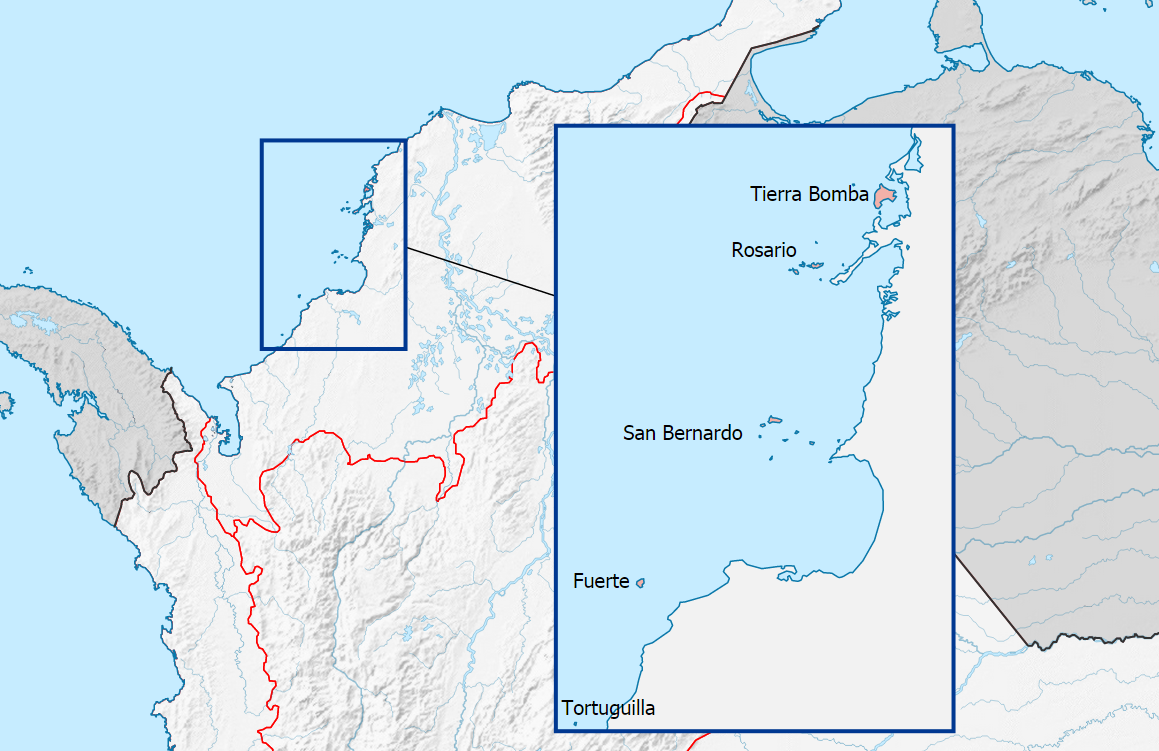
Location map of the Rosario islands

The Rosario Islands (Islas del Rosario), also referred to as Corales Islas del Rosario (Coral Islands of Rosario), is an archipelago located off the coast of Colombia, approximately 20 kilometres (12 miles) from Cartagena. It is one of the 46 Natural National Parks of Colombia. The national park was founded in 1988, to protect one of the most important coral reefs of the Colombian Caribbean coast. People can visit the national park area of the islands, and tours are available. Isla Rosario has an aquarium and open-sea oceanarium (oceanario) that people can visit. Activities include swimming, snorkeling and fishing, among others.

== Geography and geology ==
The park has an area of 120,000 square kilometres (46,332 square miles), from the line of the highest tide to the beryl of the 50 metres (164 feet) of depth, it extends from the underwater platform and the coral reefs west from the Island of Barú, the reefs of the archipelagos of Nuestra Señora del Rosario and San Bernardo and the underwater platform in between, as well as the Tesoro, Rosario, Mucura, and Maravilla islands.

== Characteristics ==
This area was declared a Natural National Park due to the necessity to preserve and protect the coral reefs and the associated ecosystems, such as the sea grass and mangroves, and the numerous species of seaweed and animals that inhabit them.

Coral reef formation is "...enhanced on the windward side of the islands" due to wave action and water qualities that encourage coral growth.

The islands have become popular tourist destinations for day tours as well as hotels and lodges on a few of the islands.

== History ==
In 1985, the area was described as "extremely dangerous to approach" by boat.

The Colombian drug lord and narcoterrorist, Pablo Escobar, owned a huge Caribbean getaway on Isla Grande. The compound, now half-demolished and overtaken by vegetation and wild animals, featured a mansion, apartments, courtyards, a large swimming pool, a helicopter landing pad, reinforced windows, tiled floors, and a large but unfinished building to the side of the mansion.

== Scuba diving ==
There are 28 diving sites known in this area.

== See also ==
- Caribbean region of Colombia
- Insular region of Colombia
- List of islands of South America
