= Apiao =

Island of the Chiloé archipelago, Chile

Native name: Isla Apiao
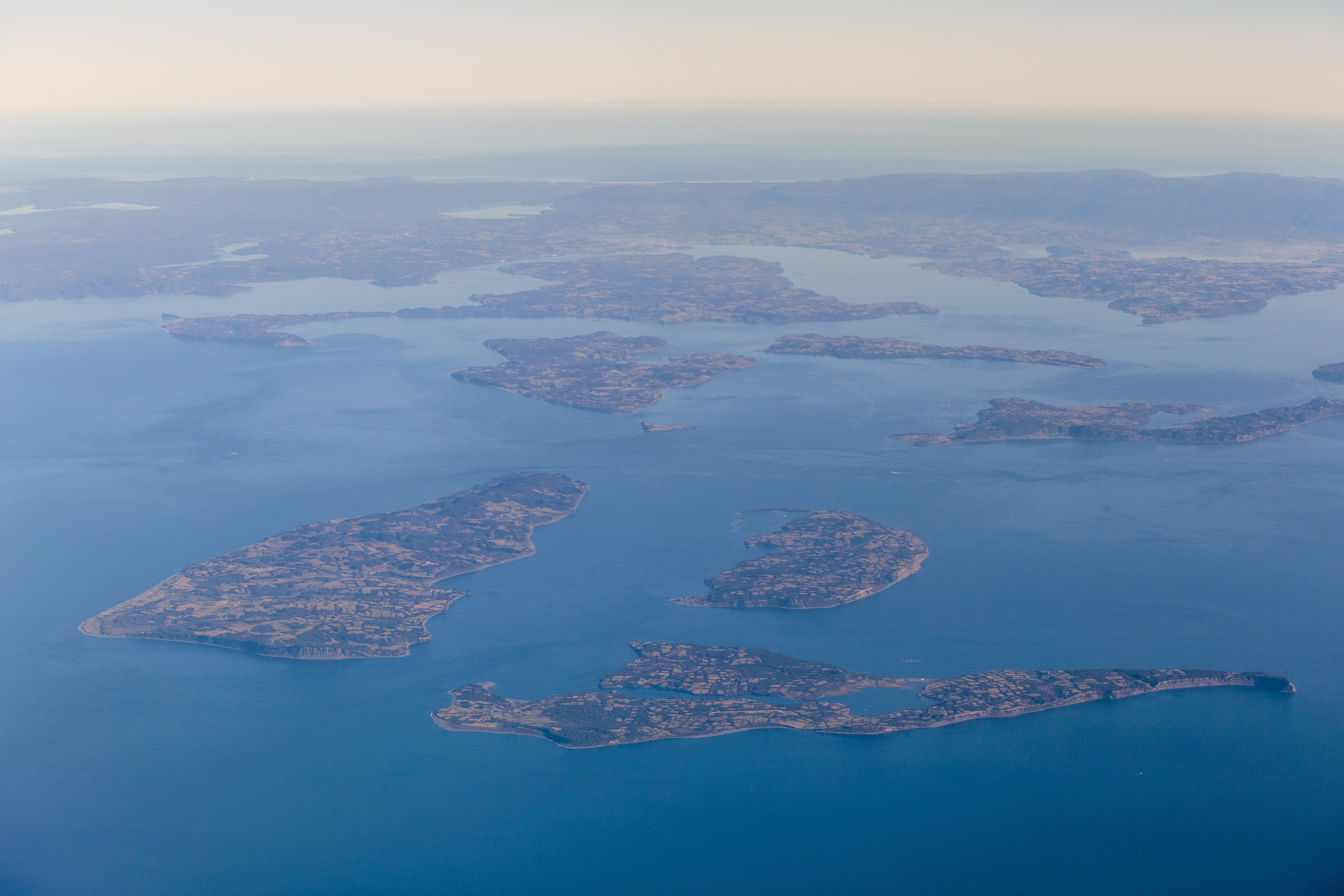
- Interactive map of Apiao

Geography
- Location: Chiloé Archipelago
- Coordinates: 42°35′41″S 73°13′10″W

Administration
- Chile
- Region: Los Lagos
- Province: Chiloé
- Commune: Quinchao

Demographics
- Population: 621 (2017)

Apiao is an island in the Chiloé Archipelago, in the zona sur of Chile. It is part of the commune of Quinchao, being the easternmost of its islands.

As of the 2017 census, The island has 621 inhabitants.

== Description ==
The island has had a community family health center since 2008, which was formerly a rural health post. The center also serves the needs of Alao and Chaulinec. Apiao also has two educational schools: the Metahue Basic School, created around 1910, and the Ostricultura Rural School.

Since 2013 it has had a floating dock 50 meters long by 2 meters wide, which works in any tidal condition.
