= Mornington Island (Chile) =

Island in Chile

Native name: Isla Mornington
- Location within Chile

Geography
- Coordinates: 49.695513°S 75.359562°W
- Adjacent to: Pacific Ocean
- Area: 529 km^{2} (204 sq mi)

Administration
- Chile
- Region: Magallanes Region
- Province: Última Esperanza
- Commune: Puerto Natales

Additional information
- NGA UFI -893003

Mornington Island (Chile) is an island in the Magallanes y la Antártica Chilena Region, Chile.

== See also ==
- List of islands of Chile
