= Farrel Island =

Island in Chile

Native name: Isla Farrel
- Location within Chile

Geography
- Coordinates: 50°48′S 74°50′W
- Archipelago: Hanover Archipelago
- Area: 324.9 km^{2} (125.4 sq mi)
- Highest elevation: 256.1 m (840.2 ft)

Administration
- Chile
- Region: Magallanes Region
- Province: Punta Arenas
- Commune: Punta Arenas

Additional information
- NGA UFI= -882592

Farrel Island (Spanish: Isla Farrel) is an island in the Magallanes Region, Chile.
