= Coral island =

Island formed from coral and associated material

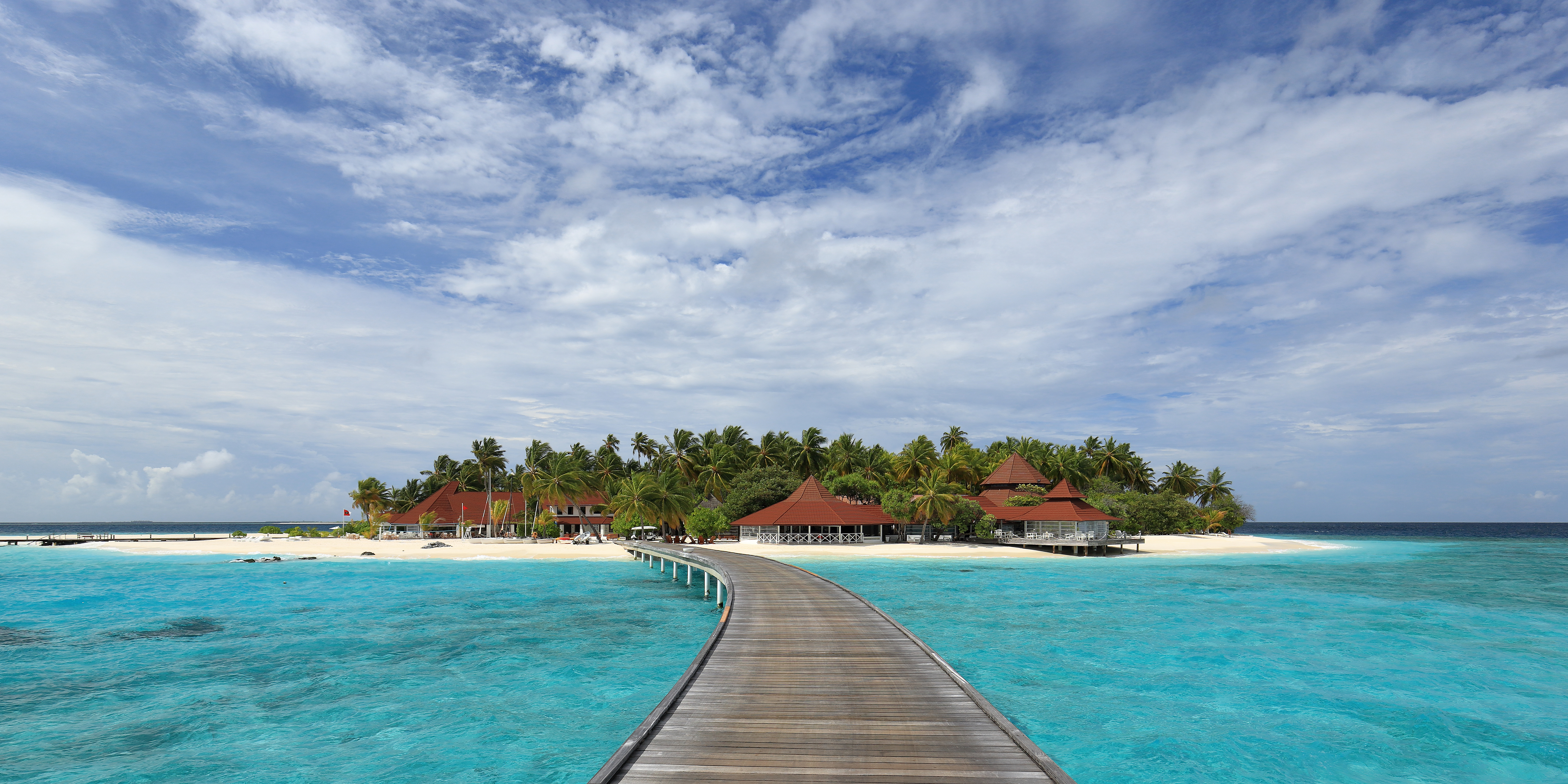
A coral island in the Maldives

A coral island is a type of island formed from coral detritus and associated organic material. It occurs in tropical and sub-tropical areas, typically as part of a coral reef which has grown to cover a far larger area under the sea. The term low island can be used to distinguish such islands from high islands, which are formed through volcanic action. Low islands are formed as a result of sedimentation upon a coral reef or of the uplifting of such islands.

== Ecosystem ==
Healthy reef system

Coral reefs are some of the oldest ecosystems on the planet. Over geological time, they form massive reefs of limestone. The reef environment supports more plant and animal species than any other habitat. Coral reefs are vital for life in multiple aspects some of which include structure, ecology, and nutrient cycles which all support biodiversity in the reefs.

Coral reefs build massive calcareous skeletons that serve as homes for animals such as fish hiding inside the nooks and crannies of the reef and barnacles attaching themselves directly to the coral's structure. The structures also help plants that need the sun to photosynthesize, by lifting the plants to the ocean's surface where the sunlight can penetrate the water. The structures also create calm zones in the ocean providing a place for fish and plant species to thrive.

Over geological time a reef may reach the surface and can become a coral island, where it begins a whole new ecosystem for land-based creatures.

== Formation ==
Volcano with fringing reef, to barrier reef, and finally formation into a coral atoll

A coral island begins as a volcanic island over a hot spot. As the volcano emerges from the sea, a fringing reef grows on the outskirt of the volcano. The volcano eventually moves off the hot spot by means of plate tectonics. Once this occurs, the volcano can no longer keep up with the wave erosion and undergoes subsidence.

Once the island is submerged, the coral must keep growing to stay in the epipelagic zone. This causes the coral to grow into an atoll with a shallow lagoon in the middle. The lagoon undergoes accretion and creates an island completely made of carbonate materials. The process is later enhanced with the remains of plant life which grows on the island.

=== Low vs. high island ===
The term "low island" refers to geologic origin rather than a strict classification of height. Some low islands, such as Banaba, Makatea, Nauru, and Niue, rise several hundred feet above sea level, while numerous high islands (those of volcanic origin) rise a few feet above sea level, often classified as "rocks". Low islands ring the lagoons of atolls. The two types of islands are often found in proximity to each other. This is especially the case among the islands of the South Pacific Ocean, where low islands are found on the fringing reefs that surround most high islands.

== Distribution ==
Most of the world's coral islands are in the Pacific Ocean, but they are also found in the Atlantic and Indian Oceans. The American territories of Jarvis, Baker and Howland Islands are clear examples of coral islands in the Pacific. Atolls in the Atlantic are found in Colombia's Archipelago of San Andrés, Providencia and Santa Catalina. The Lakshadweep Islands union territory of India is a group of 39 coral islands, along with some minor islets and banks. Some of the islands belonging to Kiribati are considered coral islands. The Maldives consist of coral islands. St. Martin's Island is an 8 km^{2} (3.1 mi^{2}) coral island located in Bangladesh. Coral islands are located near Pattaya and Ko Samui, Thailand.

== Ecology ==
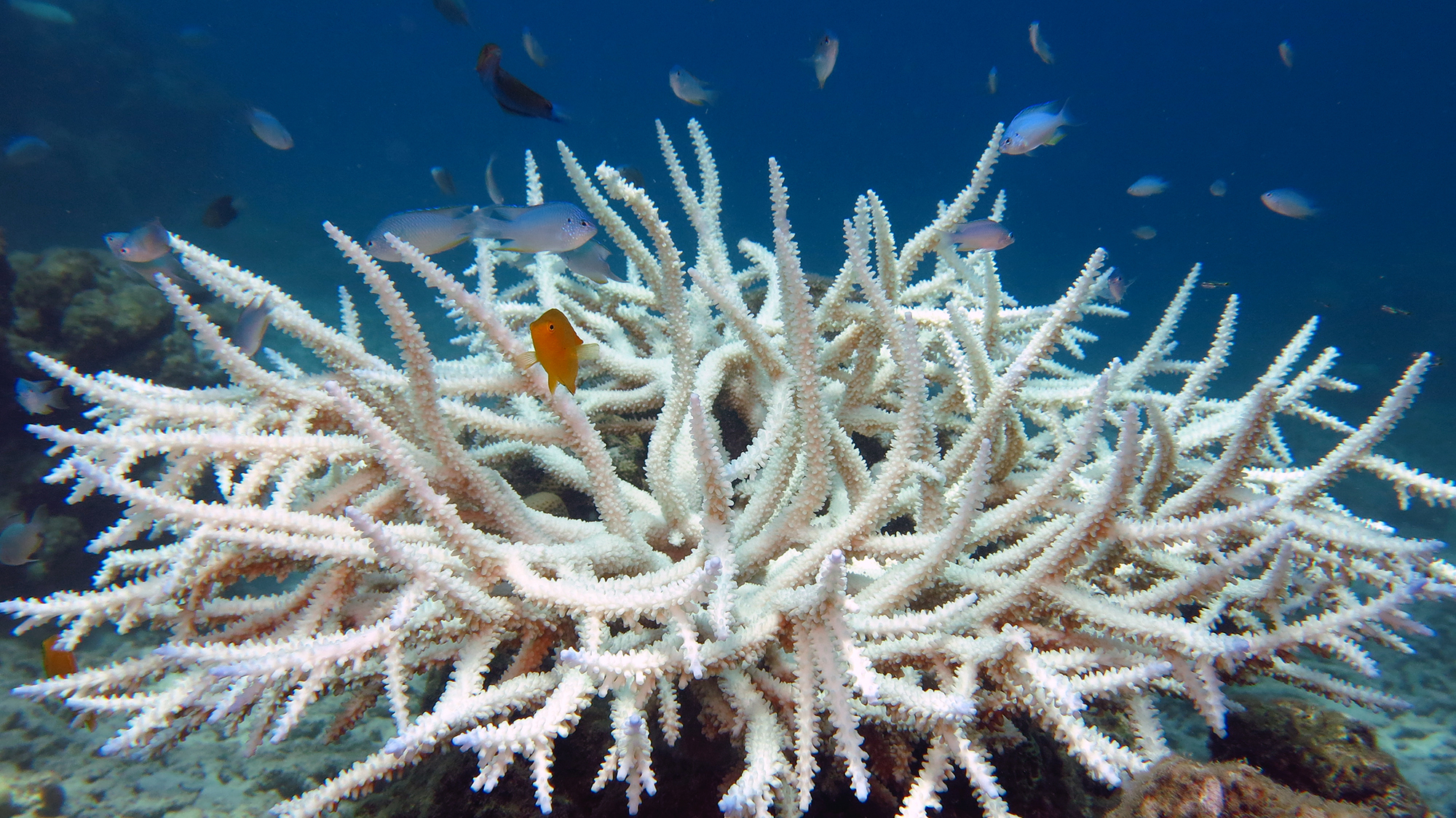
Bleached coral due to rising sea temperature, increased acidity, and/or pollution.

Coral is important for biodiversity and the growth of fish populations, so maintaining coral reefs is important. Many coral islands are small with low elevation above sea level. Thus they are at threat from storms and rising sea levels. Through chemical and physical changes humans can cause significant harm to reef systems and slow the creation of coral island chains.

Coral reefs are threatened by numerous anthropogenic impacts, some of which have already had major effects worldwide. Reefs grow in shallow, warm, nutrient-poor waters where they are not outcompeted by phytoplankton. By adding fertilizers into the water runoff, phytoplankton populations can explode and choke out coral reef systems. Adding too many sediments can cause a similar problem by blocking out the sun, starving the zooxanthellae that live on coral causing it to undergo a process known as coral bleaching.

The ocean's acidity is also a factor. Coral is made of calcium carbonate and is dissolved by carbonic acid. With the increase in carbon dioxide from combustion reactions in the atmosphere through precipitation, carbon dioxide mixes with water and forms carbonic acid, raising the ocean's acidity which slows coral growth.

Although low islands may have fewer potential habitats than high islands, thus lower species diversity, studies of both types of islands in Palau found that species diversity, at least in the waters around the island, is more affected by island size than by its origin.

== Climate and habitability ==
Low islands have poor, sandy soil and little fresh water, which makes them difficult to farm. They cannot support human habitation as well as high islands. They are also threatened by sea level rise due to global warming. The people that do live on low islands survive mostly by fishing. Low islands usually have an oceanic climate.

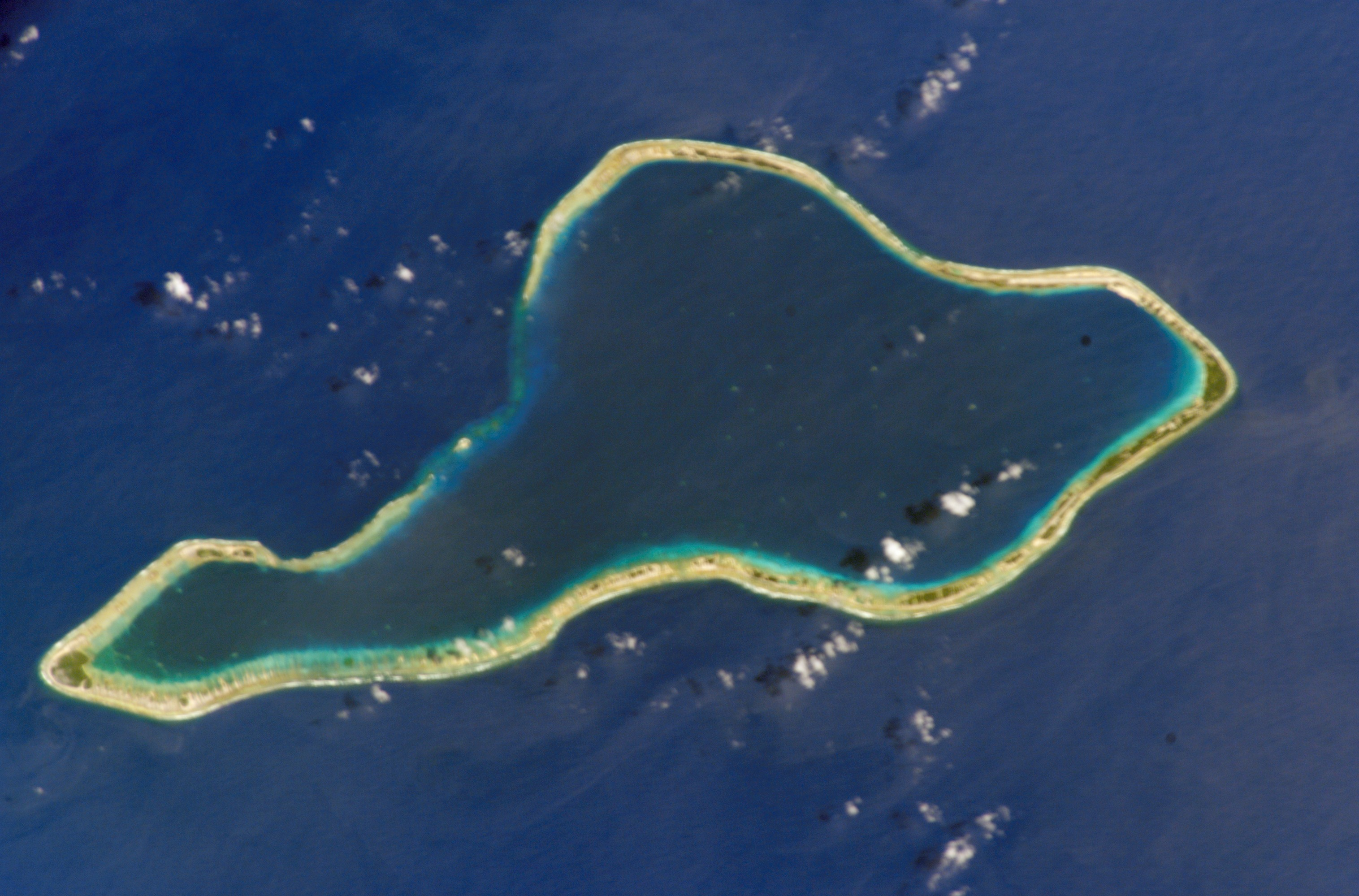
The Moruroa atoll, composed of low islands on the reef encircling a central lagoon

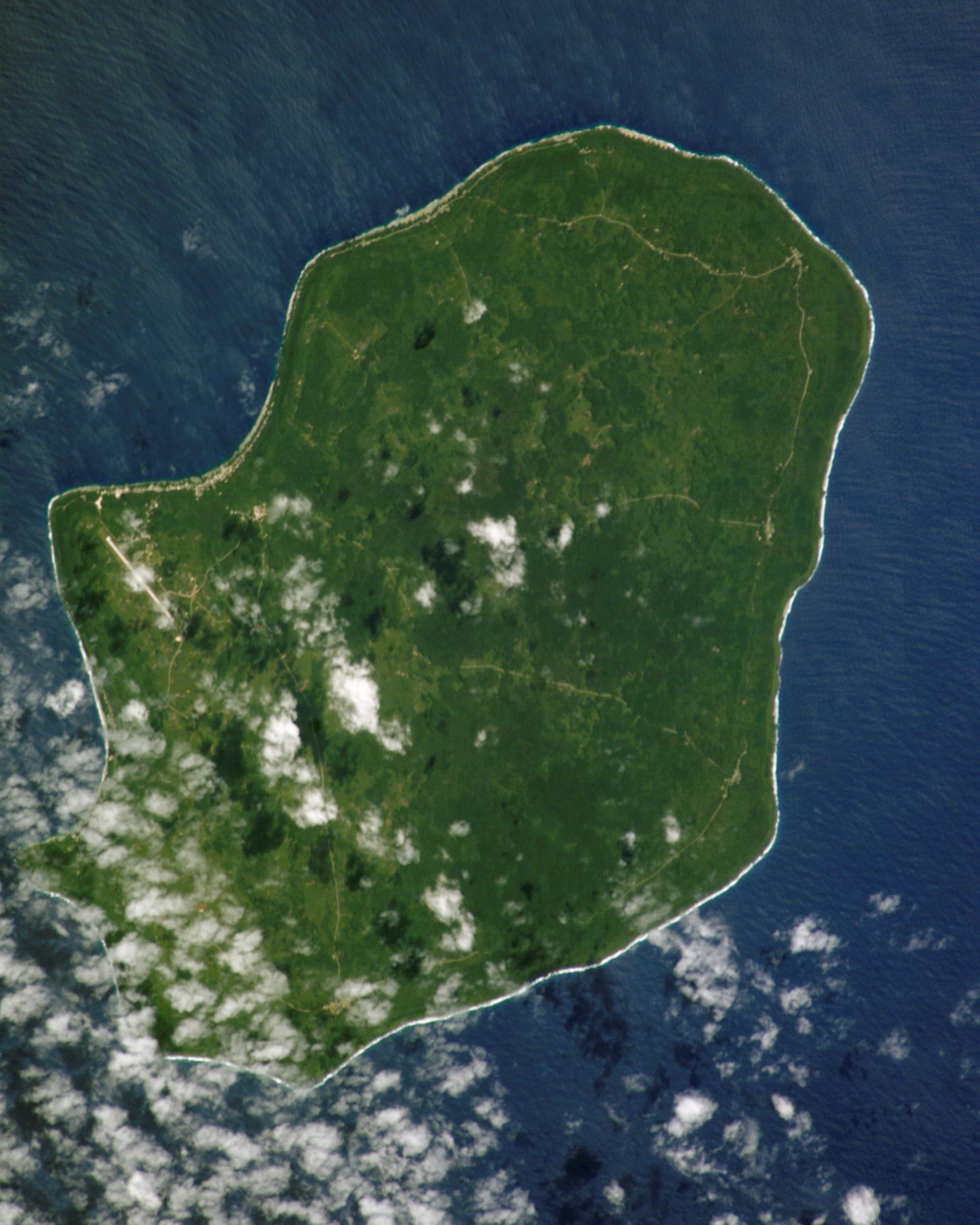
Satellite image of Niue, a low island and former atoll, where reef and lagoon have risen above sea level due to uplifting

== See also ==
- Raised coral atoll
