= Gulf of Morrosquillo =

Gulf of the Caribbean Sea

Coordinates: 9.5833°N 75.6667°W

The Gulf of Morrosquillo (Spanish: Golfo de Morrosquillo) is a gulf of the Caribbean Sea bounded by the Colombian Departments of Sucre and Córdoba. From West to East it runs approximately 80 kilometres (50 mi) from Boca de Tinajones, mouth of Sinú River, in Córdoba, to Punta San Bernardo (San Bernardo Point) in Sucre.

== Features ==
The coastline of the Gulf of Morrosquillo is shared by the departments of Sucre and Córdoba on the north of Colombia. The main city on the gulf is Tolú; five kilometers away from Tolú is "Las Playas del Francés" (The Frenchman's Beaches) distinguished because of its wide white sand beaches.

Seventeen kilometers away from Tolú is located the tourist town of Coveñas, where besides the beautiful beaches it is possible to taste the local food and enjoy of the ecotourism by a canoe trip in La Cienaga La Caimanera, a relict of the native animals and plants.

It is an idyllic site with temperature ranging from 70 degrees - 90 degrees, water temperature will also range from 70 - 84. It is in the Caribbean and is hurricane free. The town of Tolú was founded in 1535 and has never been hit by a hurricane.

The Rio Sinu used to empty into the Gulf, but since about 1941, it changed course and the beaches are not as large as they had been. It is hoped that the departments of Sucre and Cordoba, the national government and Ecopetrol will dredge to replenish the beaches of Tolu and will change the course of the Sinu River so that the beaches can once again be self-sustaining.
