= United States Miscellaneous Caribbean Islands =

Obsolete collective term

The United States Miscellaneous Caribbean Islands is an obsolete collective term for the territories currently or formerly controlled by the United States in the Caribbean Sea. Most of the islands were acquired through claims made via the Guano Islands Act.

== Islands ==
- Bajo Nuevo Bank (Note: Also known as the Petrel Islands.) (controlled by Colombia, claimed by the United States and Jamaica) – formerly claimed by Honduras (settled on 20 December 1999 (Note: Honduras effectively ended its role in the dispute with the ratification of a maritime boundary treaty with Colombia on 20 December 1999.)) and Nicaragua (resolved on 19 November 2012 (Note: On 19 November 2012, in regards to Nicaraguan claims to the islands, the International Court of Justice (ICJ) ruled unanimously that Colombia has sovereignty over both Bajo Nuevo Bank and Serranilla Bank.))
- Corn Islands (returned to Nicaragua on 25 April 1971)
- Navassa Island (administered as an unincorporated unorganized territory, claimed by Haiti)
- Quita Sueño Bank (claim abandoned on 17 September 1981, administered by Colombia)
- Roncador Bank (ceded to Colombia on 17 September 1981)
- Serrana Bank (ceded to Colombia on 17 September 1981)
- Serranilla Bank (controlled by Colombia, claimed by the United States and Jamaica) – formerly claimed by Honduras (settled on 20 December 1999) and Nicaragua (resolved on 19 November 2012)
- Swan Islands (ceded to Honduras on 01 September 1972)

The islands were given the FIPS country code of BQ before 1974. With the transfer of sovereignty of most of the islands, the FIPS country code of BQ now represents only Navassa Island, still administered by the United States.

== See also ==
- Insular area
- List of ISO 3166 country codes
- Territories of the United States
- UN M49
- United Nations geoscheme
- United States Minor Outlying Islands
- United States Miscellaneous Pacific Islands
