= Jones v. United States (1890) =

US Supreme Court case that upheld the Guano Islands Act

- Supreme Court of the United States

Argued October 29, 1889 Decided November 24, 1890
- Full case name: Henry Jones v. United States
- Citations: 137 U.S. 202 (more) 11 S. Ct. 80 34 L.Ed. 691

Holding
- Section 6 of the Guano Islands Act (48 U.S.C. § 1417) is constitutional.

Court membership
- Chief Justice Melville Fuller Associate Justices Stephen J. Field · Joseph P. Bradley; John M. Harlan · Horace Gray; Samuel Blatchford · Lucius Q. C. Lamar II; David J. Brewer

Case opinion
- Majority: Gray, joined by unanimous

Laws applied
- Guano Islands Act

Jones v. United States 137 U.S. 202 (1890) is a United States Supreme Court case in which the court upheld the constitutionality of the Guano Islands Act, which states that any island that fell under the act was under the jurisdiction of any existing statutes or laws pertaining to high seas. The case originated from claims that the United States government could not prosecute Henry Jones for committing murder on Navassa Island during a riot.

== Background ==
The Guano Islands Act, passed in 1856, allowed any American to claim any unclaimed island containing guano deposits as property of the United States. According to Section 6 of the act, any crimes or offenses committed on or adjacent to these islands "shall be deemed committed on the high seas, on board a merchant ship or vessel belonging to the United States; and shall be punished according to the laws of the United States relating to such ships or vessels and offenses on the high seas ..."

In 1857, the Navassa Island, claimed under the Guano Islands Act, was under the ownership of the Navassa Phosphate Company of Baltimore. By 1889, the company had a reported 148 workers on the island for the purpose of mining. Under reports of hazardous work conditions, the miners rioted. During the riot, five supervisors died, and eighteen workers were returned to Baltimore on an American warship to await three separate trials on the charges of murder. The Order of Galilean Fishermen, a black fraternal society, decided to fund the miners' defense.

== Facts of the case ==
In the specific case of worker Henry Jones, he was charged with the murder of Thomas N. Foster. The defense claimed the accused were justified in their action under the contention that Jones acted in self-defense, and that the United States did not have jurisdiction over the island.

The Maryland court dismissed these claims and, under the charges of murder, sentenced the defendant to death.

=== Appeals ===
The case was appealed from the Maryland District Court to the United States Court of Appeals for the Fourth Circuit, which was appealed up to the Supreme Court. Jones was represented by Everett J. Waring, making this the first instance of an African American arguing before the Supreme Court.

== Decision ==
The court examined the issue of whether the Guano Islands Act enabled the jurisdiction of the United States over Navassa Island and thus the murderers. The court held that it did. Justice Horace Gray wrote the opinion for a unanimous court. He stated that due to acts and amendments from Congress, any crime committed on the high seas would be directed and subject to trial within the state that the territorial waters belong to or the state in which the accused originates from. On this, Gray deemed Jones subject to the jurisdiction of Maryland, despite not being within its boundaries when committing the crime. Because of this reasoning, it was concluded that Section 6 of the Guano Islands Act was in line with settled law.

It was then stated that Navassa Island fell within the act as it had confirmed supplies of guano and thus fell within all the rules and conditions stated within the act. Thus the court affirmed the decisions of the lower courts to charge Jones with murder and to sentence him to death.

== Aftermath ==
Jones v. United States was a contentious case publicly at the time. Many saw it as a case of worker and black rights versus white overseers as all the supervisors killed on Navassa Island were white, and all those charged with murder were people of color.

While the court upheld Henry Jones' death sentence, efforts by black-run organizations and communities, as well as white jurors from the trials, to have the sentence commuted eventually reached President Benjamin Harrison. Harrison subsequently commuted the sentences to prison time and the case was brought up in the 1891 State of the Union Address.

== See also ==
- List of United States Supreme Court cases, volume 137
