= United States Miscellaneous Pacific Islands =

Obsolete collective term

The United States Miscellaneous Pacific Islands is an obsolete term used to collectively describe Baker Island, Howland Island, Jarvis Island, Kingman Reef, and Palmyra Atoll, all of them territories in the Pacific Ocean administered by the United States by way of the Guano Islands Act.

== Islands ==
- Baker Island (administered as an unincorporated unorganized territory)
- Howland Island (administered as an unincorporated unorganized territory)
- Jarvis Island (administered as an unincorporated unorganized territory)
- Kingman Reef (administered as an unincorporated unorganized territory)
- Palmyra Atoll (administered as an incorporated unorganized territory)

The islands were given the ISO country codes of PU (alpha-2), PUS (alpha-3), and 849 (numeric) before 1986 (now PUUM), and the FIPS country code of IQ before 1981. For ISO purposes, the islands are now defined as parts of the United States Minor Outlying Islands, together with Johnston Atoll, Midway Atoll, Navassa Island, and Wake Island, while each island is now given a separate FIPS code.

== See also ==
- Insular area
- List of ISO 3166 country codes
- Territories of the United States
- UN M49
- United Nations geoscheme
- United States Minor Outlying Islands
- United States Miscellaneous Caribbean Islands
