= Guano Islands Act =

Congressional act of the United States

Guano Islands Act of 1856
- Long title: An Act to authorize Protection to be given to Citizens of the United States who may discover Deposits of Guano
- Enacted by: the 34th United States Congress
- Effective: August 18, 1856

Citations
- Public law: Pub. L. 34–164
- Statutes at Large: 11 Stat. 119

Legislative history
- Introduced in the Senate as S. 339 by William H. Seward (R–NY) on May 26, 1856; Committee consideration by Foreign Relations; Passed the Senate on July 24, 1856; Passed the House on August 16, 1856; Signed into law by President Franklin Pierce on August 18, 1856

The Guano Islands Act (11 Stat. 119, enacted August 18, 1856, codified at 48 U.S.C. ch. 8 §§ 1411–1419) is a United States federal law passed by the Congress that enables citizens of the United States to take possession of unclaimed islands containing guano deposits in the name of the United States. The islands can be located anywhere, so long as they are not occupied by citizens of another country and not within the jurisdiction of another government. It also empowers the president to use the military to protect such interests and establishes the criminal jurisdiction of the United States in these territories.

== Background ==
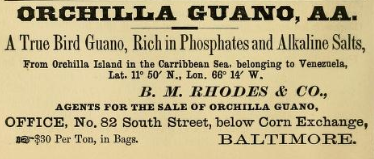
Guano importation was a major business, as this 1873 advertisement attests.

In the 1840s, guano became a prized agricultural fertilizer and source of saltpeter for gunpowder.

The U.S. began importing it in 1843 through New York. By the early 1850s, the UK imported over 200,000 tons a year, and U.S. imports totaled about 760,000 tons. The "guano mania" of the 1850s led to high prices in an oligopolistic market, government attempts to control prices, fear of resource exhaustion, and eventually the enactment of the Guano Islands Act of 1856 in August 1856. The act authorizes U.S. citizens to take possession of unclaimed islands containing guano for the U.S., empowers the President to protect such claims with military intervention, and establishes jurisdiction of criminal offenses under the laws of the United States within the territories, thus claimed. This encouraged American entrepreneurs to search for and exploit new deposits on tiny islands and reefs in the Caribbean and Pacific.

This was the beginning of the concept of insular area in U.S. territories. Up until this time, any territory acquired by the U.S. was considered to have become an integral part of the country unless changed by treaty and eventually to have the opportunity to become a state of the Union. With insular areas, land could be held by the federal government without the prospect of it ever becoming a state in the Union.

On November 22, 1971, the United States handed over the Swan Islands to Honduras after signing the Treaty of the Swan Islands. Honduras began exercising this sovereignty on September 1, 1972.

Under the act, the U.S. gained control of around 94 islands. By 1903, 66 of these islands were recognized as territories of the U.S.

== Wording ==
Whenever any citizen of the United States discovers a deposit of guano on any island, rock, or key, not within the lawful jurisdiction of any other Government, and not occupied by the citizens of any other Government, and takes peaceable possession thereof, and occupies the same, such island, rock, or key may, at the discretion of the president, be considered as appertaining to the United States.

— Section 1 of the Guano Islands Act

== Criminal jurisdiction ==
Section 6 provides that criminal acts on or adjacent to these territories "shall be deemed committed on the high seas, on board a merchant ship or vessel belonging to the United States; and shall be punished according to the laws of the United States relating to such ships or vessels and offenses on the high seas". The provision was considered and ruled constitutional by the U.S. Supreme Court in Jones v. United States, 137 U.S. 202 (1890).

== Result ==
The Act continues to be part of the law of the United States. The most recent Guano Islands Act claim was made in 1997 to Navassa Island. However, the claim was denied because an American court ruled the island was already under American jurisdiction (a claim Haiti disputes).

== Claims ==
While more than 100 islands have been claimed for the United States under the Guano Islands Act, all but ten have been withdrawn. The Act specifically allows the islands to be considered possessions of the U.S. The Act does not specify the territory's status after private U.S. interests abandon it or the guano is exhausted, creating neither obligation nor prohibition of retaining possession.

Current islands still claimed by the United States under the Act are:

- Baker Island
- Howland Island
- Jarvis Island
- Johnston Atoll
- Kingman Reef/Danger Rock
- Midway Atoll
- Navassa Island (claimed by Haiti)
- Bajo Nuevo Bank (disputed with Colombia)
- Serranilla Bank (disputed with Colombia)
- Swains Island (part of American Samoa; no evidence that guano was mined. Claimed by Tokelau)

== Disputed claims ==
A few islands claimed by the United States under the Guano Act of 1856 are disputed.

- Navassa Island — de facto US control. To cement the U.S. claim to Navassa Island against Haiti, President James Buchanan issued Executive Orders establishing United States territorial jurisdiction beyond just the Guano Act of 1856. The United States Supreme Court in 1890 ruled the Guano Act constitutional and, citing the actions of the Executive Branch, amongst other points in law, determined Navassa Island as pertaining to the United States. Control of Navassa Island was transferred by the Department of the Interior to the Director of the Office of Insular Affairs under Order No. 3205 on January 16, 1997. The Department of the Interior and Insular Affairs would later grant administration responsibilities to the United States Fish and Wildlife Service under Order No. 3210 on December 3, 1999. Order No 3210 also established a 12-nautical-mile (22 km; 14 mi) territorial sea boundary for the United States around Navassa Island.
- Serranilla Bank and the Bajo Nuevo Bank. Serranilla Bank and the Bajo Nuevo Bank were ruled to be territory of Colombia by the International Court of Justice in 2001, against a claim by Nicaragua. The U.S. and Honduras have asserted claims. Colombia has granted fishing rights to Jamaica.

=== Private unrecognized claim ===
- In 1964, Leicester Hemingway, brother of author Ernest Hemingway, attempted to establish a country (or more appropriately, a micronation) dubbed the Republic of New Atlantis, on an 8-by-30-foot (2.4 m × 9.1 m) bamboo raft anchored with an engine block outside the territorial waters of Jamaica, using the Guano Islands Act as part of a claim to sovereignty. His apparent intention was to use the new country as the headquarters for his own International Marine Research Society, with which he planned to further marine research and protect Jamaican fishing. Neither the U.S. nor Jamaica recognized his claim before the raft was destroyed in a storm in 1966.

== See also ==
- List of Guano Island claims
- United States Miscellaneous Pacific Islands
- United States Minor Outlying Islands
