= Order of Galilean Fishermen =

African American fraternal society

The Order of Galilean Fishermen was an African American fraternal order founded in 1856. Open to both men and women, it provided members sick and death benefits.

== History ==
The Order was founded July 4, 1856, in south Baltimore, and in February 1869, it was formally incorporated as the National Grand Tabernacle of Galileans of the United States of Baltimore City. In 1911, the group was reincorporated as The Order of Galilean Fishermen. It was one of the few fraternal orders open to both men and women in the nineteenth century.

The Order's founders and first leaders were Hemsley and Harriet Nichols of John Wesley Methodist Church in Baltimore, Maryland. Credit for founding the Order is also given to Anthony S. Perpener, a Prince Hall Freemason and Grand United Order Odd Fellow, of Washington, D.C.

The Nichols were leaders in Baltimore's free Black community and wanted to create an institution that could help support Black working families in the city. Founded on the principles of mutual aid, the Order offered a form of insurance to help members who were ill along with funeral expenses. Members of the Order pledged to bring disagreements among themselves to the Order for resolution, as opposed to using the court system.

After the Civil War, the Order grew quickly, becoming one of the largest African American fraternal organizations in Maryland with more than 5,000 members in the state by 1890. The Order reached Virginia in 1874 and established a bank and printing office in Hampton, Virginia, in 1901. In 1885, Fisherman's Hall was built in Charles Town, West Virginia, and is still in use today as a community center. A Galilean Temple was built in Rockville, Maryland, in 1903 and established a cemetery in 1917. A marker stands at the former location of the Temple. In Nottoway County, Virginia, the Order built a home for aged members and a training school for orphans. Similarly, in August 1900, the Order bought a former plantation in Tuscaloosa County, Alabama and a sawmill to create an industrial farm and training program.

Improving educational opportunities for Black children and families was another area of activity for the Order. They founded schools in Loudon County, Virginia, and other places where options for Black education were limited. In 1902, the Order's Tabernacle No. 47 purchased a tract of land where the first Rosenwald School in Calvert County, Maryland, would be constructed in 1921.

Over the years, Galilean temples and halls were established as far away as New England, the Great Lakes, and the Caribbean. One member in particular, Civil War Union Navy veteran Anthony Armstrong, worked to bring the Order to the West Indies. In 1897, there were 56,000 members and the Order had assets worth $125,000 ($4.84 million in 2025). However, by 1974 its membership had declined to approximately 500 members, primarily in Maryland.

=== Navassa workers defense ===
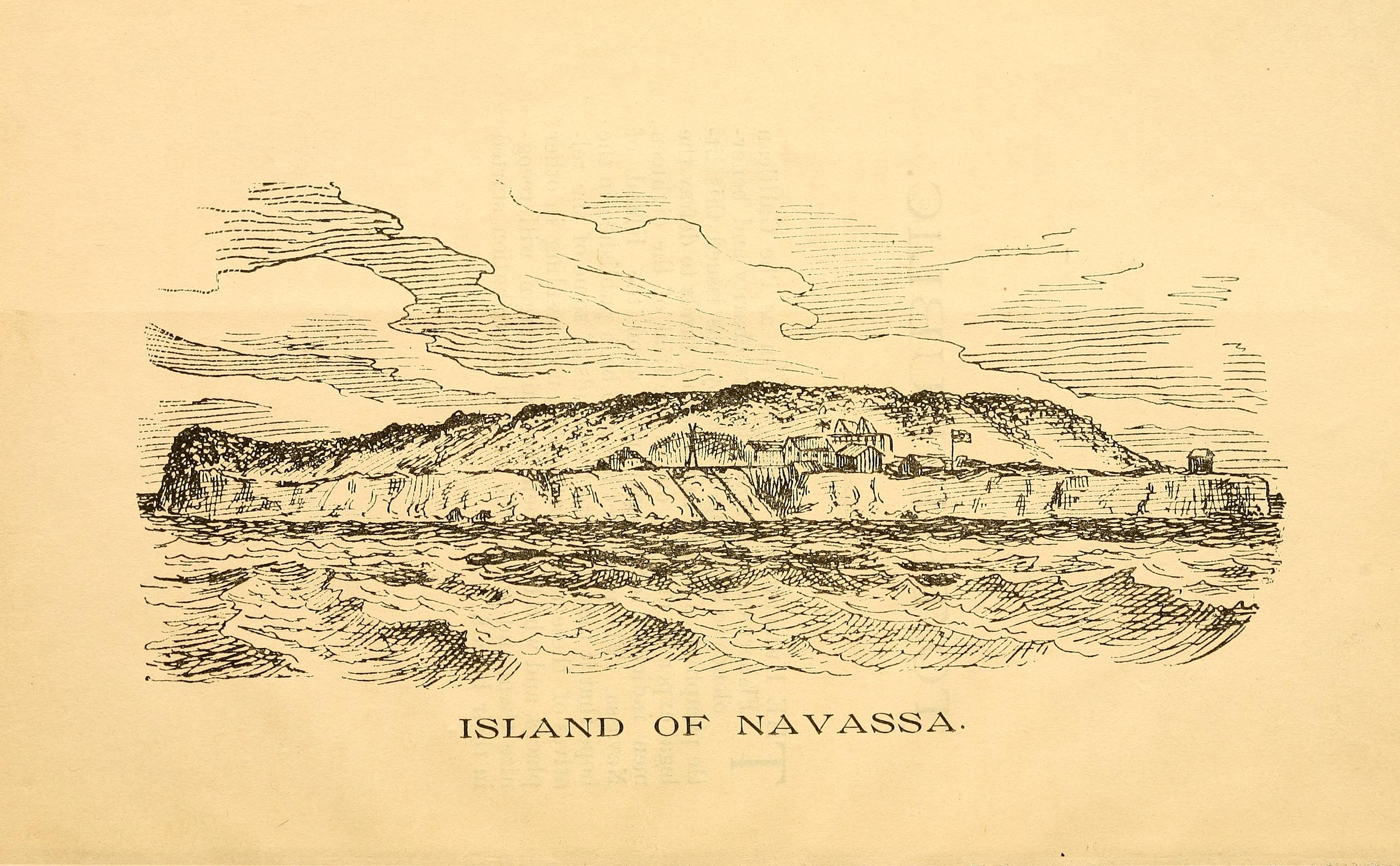
Sketch of Navassa island (1889)

The Order was a strong proponent of civil rights and in 1889, it raised funds to pay for the legal defense of the eighteen men convicted in the 1889 riot on Navassa Island. The case, Jones v. United States (1890), went all the way to the Supreme Court of the United States. The case was lost, and the men were convicted of murder, but, due to organizing of the Order and other Black organizations and communities, the sentence was commuted to prison time by President Benjamin Harrison.

== Symbolism ==
The emblems of the order include the fish, Passion cross, rose, and INRI of the eighteenth degree of Scottish Rite Freemasonry.
