= Jamaica Channel =

Strait in the Caribbean Sea

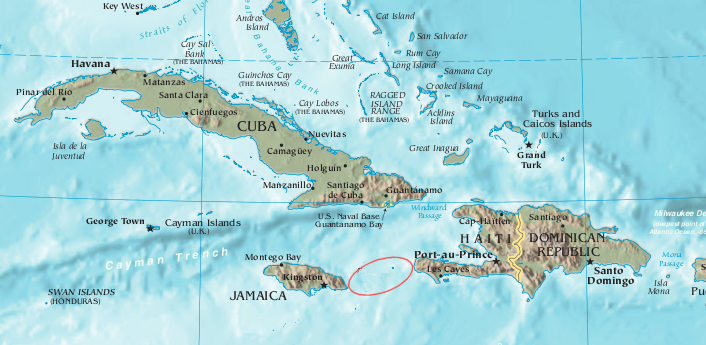
- The northern Caribbean showing in red the location of Jamaica Channel.

- Location within the Caribbean
- Coordinates: 18°09′41.5″N 75°17′13.6″W
- Basin countries: United States; Jamaica; Haiti

The Jamaica Channel is a strait separating the islands of Jamaica and Hispaniola, in the Caribbean Sea. Along with the Windward Passage to its north. Due to its location about 1,000 kilometres (620 mi) north-east of the Panama Canal, it is a main sea lane through which vessels with Pacific Ocean destinations sailing from the eastern seaboards of the United States and Canada, as well as from Europe, frequently pass.

The strait is about 190 kilometres (120 mi) wide with depths of up to 1,200 metres (3,900 ft).

== Navassa Island ==
Located in the strait about 55 km (34 mi) west of Haiti is Navassa Island, an uninhabited and disputed island measuring 5.2 km^{2} (2.0 sq mi).
