= Bat Cave mine =

Former mining operation in Mohave County, Arizona

Coordinates: 36°2′55.8″N 113°48′9″W

External images
- Old cable headhouse at Guano Point, for the aerial tramway to the mine.
- Bat Cave mine site (top center) and old tramway tower (left center).
- "Guano Cafe" at Guano Point.

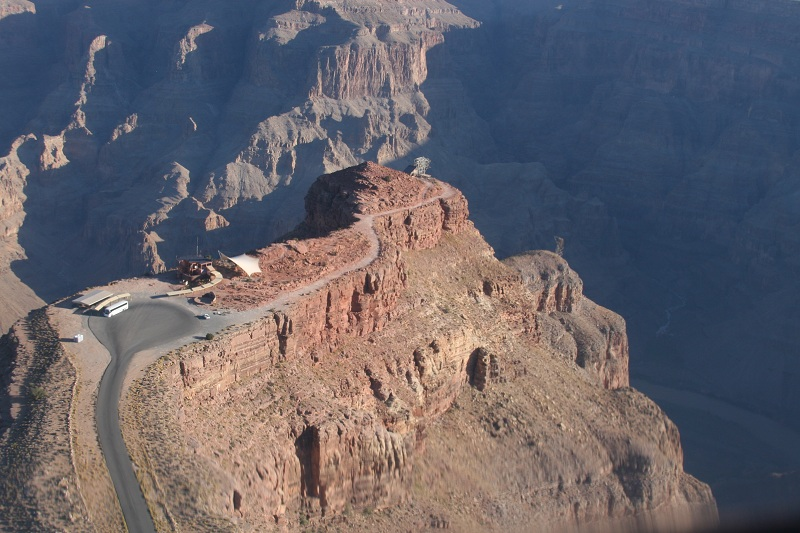
Aerial view of Guano Point. Old tramway headhouse is at the end of dirt road (right). Second tramway tower is more clearly visible, on skyline to right. Bat Cave mine is 2,500 feet (760 m) below, across the canyon.

The Bat Cave mine was a bat guano mine in a natural cave located in the western Grand Canyon of Arizona at river mile 266, 800 feet (240 m) above Lake Mead.

== Mining ==
The cave was apparently discovered in the 1930s by a passing boater. Several unsuccessful early attempts were made to mine the nitrogen-rich guano deposit within the cave for fertilizer. The U.S. Guano Corporation bought the property around 1957. Based on a reputable mining engineer's estimate that the cave contained 100,000 tons of guano, the company constructed an elaborate plan to extract it. A small airstrip was built on a nearby sandbar in the Colorado River, and all supplies and machinery needed were flown in.

The mining engineer's estimate of the potential size of the guano deposit proved wildly optimistic: the cave contained only about 1,000 tons of minable material. Most of the cave was filled with valueless limestone rubble.

Mining ceased in early 1960. Guano sold for about $100 a ton then, sufficient to generate only $100,000 gross revenue.

=== Aerial tramway ===
An aerial tramway was built from the mine to Guano Point on the South Rim, with the cable headhouse built on land leased from the Hualapai Native American tribe. The cableway crossed the river, with a main span of 7,500 feet (2,300 m), and a vertical lift of 2,500 feet (760 m). About 30,000 feet (9,100 m) of 1.5 inch (38 mm) steel cable were used, to support and pull a cable car large enough to transport 2,500 pounds (1,100 kg) of guano. The same car was used to transport the miners to and from work. The guano was mined using a large industrial "vacuum-cleaner" with ten-inch hoses. From the cablehead, the guano was hauled by truck to Kingman, Arizona and packaged for retail sale.

During construction of the cableway, which took 14 months, the first of several mishaps occurred. When first tensioning the main cable, a clutch-lever broke, dropping 9,850 feet (3,000 m) of cable into the canyon. A new cable was ordered and strung, and mining began. The 20,000 feet (6,100 m) pull-cable wore out after a few months use and had to be replaced, bringing the company's total investment up to US$3,500,000.

In 1959, the cableway was used for the film Edge of Eternity, with the climax of the film involving a fight atop a cable car.

== Scientific study ==
Paleontologist Paul S. Martin and a colleague visited the mine in 1958, after reading a report in the New York Times that mentioned the guano came from "giant, meat-eating bats millions of years ago." The guano actually came from free-tailed bats, Tadarida brasiliensis, which eat insects. Martin collected a sample from 7 ft (2m) below the surface of the guano, which yielded a radiocarbon date of 12,900 ± 1,500 years ago. The miners reported finding "bat graveyards," some with mummified free-tail bats. No giant meat-eating bats were discovered. Martin had hoped to find fossil pollen, his research interest at that time, but found none in his samples.

== Post mine activity ==
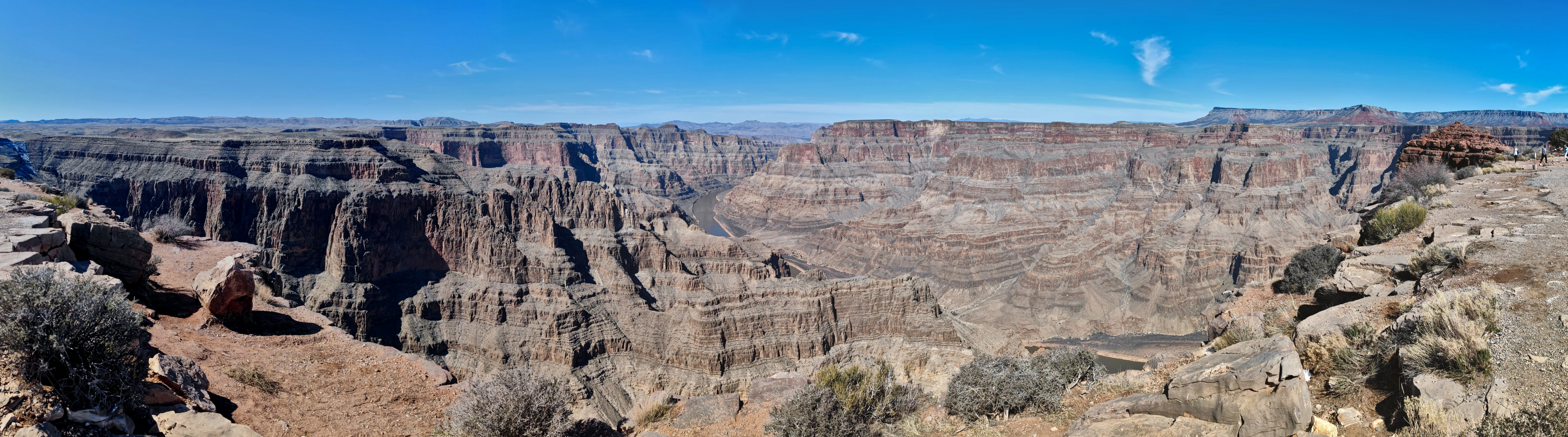
View of the Grand Canyon from Guano Point

A few months after closure of the mine, a US Air Force jet, illegally "hot-dogging" down the canyon, clipped the cable, damaging the plane's wing and severing the cable. The plane survived, and U.S. Guano successfully sued the Air Force for damaging their property, offsetting some of their losses.

In 1975 the abandoned mine became part of Grand Canyon National Park. The National Park Service later proposed removing the tramway remnants within the park, but there was public protest against demolition of these interesting historic relics. As of 2007, some remnants of the old operation remain at Bat Cave, and on the West Rim in the Hualapai Indian Reservation.

Guano Point is still a popular stop for air tours from Las Vegas, Nevada. Tourists can inspect the remnants of the old mining operation. Tour operators pay use-fees to the Hualapai tribe, and the tribe offers a barbecue lunch near the old tramway head house, as part of their Grand Canyon West business venture.
