= Navassa Island =

Disputed island in the Caribbean

Navassa Island Lanavaz (Haitian Creole); Île de la Navasse (French)
- Unincorporated and unorganized U.S. territory (Disputed)
- Map of Navassa Island

- Location in the Caribbean
- Coordinates: 18°24′36″N 75°00′45″W
- Administered by: United States
- Status: Unorganized unincorporated territory
- Territory: United States Minor Outlying Islands
- Claimed by: Haiti
- Status: Île adjacente
- Department: Grand'Anse
- Claimed by the United States: September 19, 1857
- Claimed by Haiti: 1697 (implicitly); 1874 (explicitly)

Government
  - Body: Caribbean Islands National Wildlife Refuge Complex (under the authority of the U.S. Fish and Wildlife Service)
  - Project Leader: Silmarie Padrón

Area
  - Land: 2.1 sq mi (5.4 km^{2})
- Highest elevation: 279 ft (85 m)
- Lowest elevation: 0 ft (0 m)

Population
  - Total: 0
- Time zone: UTC-5:00 (EST)
- APO / ZIP Code: 96898
- ISO 3166 code: UM-76

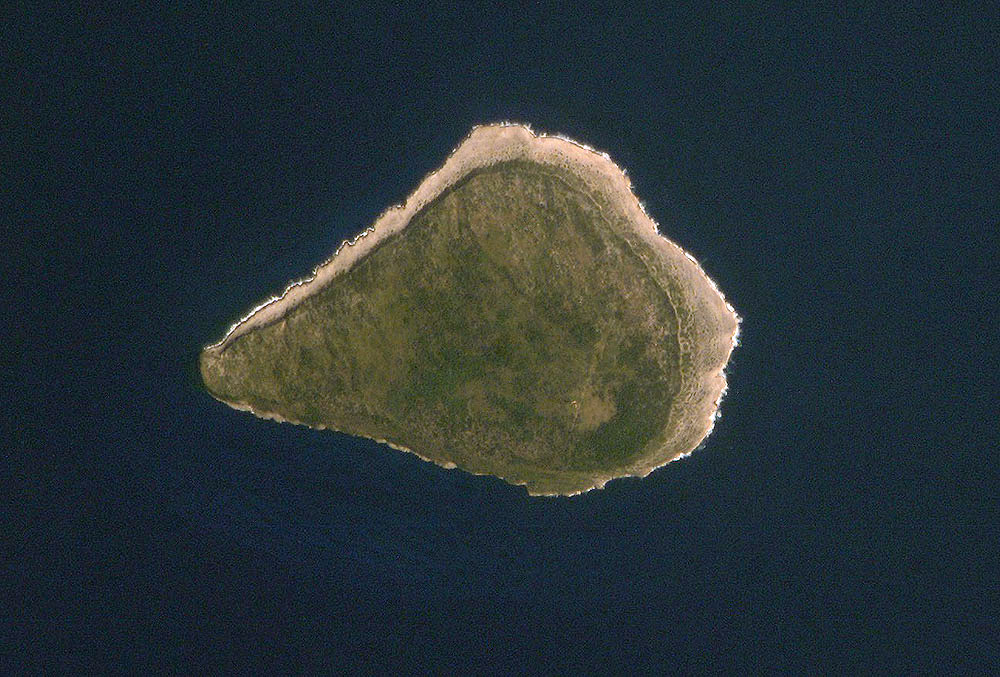
Navassa Island in 2006 from space

Navassa Island as seen in 2026

Navassa Island (/nəˈvæsə/; Haitian Creole: Lanavaz; French: Île de la Navasse, sometimes la Navase) is an uninhabited island in the Windward Passage of the Caribbean Sea. Located east of Jamaica, south of Cuba, and 40 nautical miles (74 km; 46 mi) west of Jérémie on the Tiburon Peninsula of Haiti, it is subject to an ongoing territorial dispute between Haiti and the United States, the latter of which administers the island through the U.S. Fish and Wildlife Service.

The U.S. has claimed the island as an appurtenance since 1857, based on the Guano Islands Act of 1856. Haiti's claim over Navassa goes back to the Treaty of Ryswick in 1697 that recognized French, rather than Spanish, control of the western portion of the island of Hispaniola and other specifically named nearby islands. However, there was no mention of Navassa in the treaty detailing terms. Haiti's 1801 constitution claimed several nearby islands by name, among which Navassa was not listed, but also laid claim to "other adjacent islands", which Haiti maintains included Navassa. The U.S. claim to the island, first made in 1857, asserts that Navassa was not included among the unnamed "other adjacent islands" in the 1801 Haitian Constitution. Since the Haitian Constitution of 1874, Haiti has explicitly named "la Navase" as one of the territories it claims. It maintains that it has continuously been claimed as part of Haiti since 1801.

== History ==
Navassa Island is west of Haiti's southwest peninsula, south of Cuba, east of Jamaica.

=== 1504 to 1901 ===
In 1504, Christopher Columbus, stranded on Jamaica during his fourth voyage, sent some crew members by canoe to Hispaniola for help. En route, they landed on the island, which had no water. They called it Navaza (from nava-, Spanish for 'plain' / 'field'), and mariners largely avoided it for the next 350 years. In 1798, Médéric Louis Élie Moreau de Saint-Méry, a member of the French Parliament best known for his publications on Saint-Domingue, referred to "la Navasse" as a "small island between Saint-Domingue and Jamaica".

From 1801 to 1867, the successive constitutions of Haiti claimed sovereignty over adjacent islands, both named and unnamed, although Navassa was not specifically enumerated until 1874. Navassa Island was claimed for the United States on September 19, 1857, by Peter Duncan, an American sea captain, under the Guano Islands Act of 1856, for the rich guano deposits found on the island and for not being within the lawful jurisdiction of any other government, nor occupied by another government's citizens.

Haiti protested the annexation, but on July 7, 1858, U.S. President James Buchanan issued an Executive Order supporting the American claim, calling for military action to enforce it. Navassa Island has since been maintained by the United States as an unincorporated territory (according to the Insular Cases). The United States Supreme Court on November 24, 1890, in Jones v. United States, 137 U.S. 202 (1890), Id. at 224, found that Navassa Island must be considered as appertaining to the United States, creating a legal history for the island under U.S. law, unlike many other islands initially claimed under the Guano Islands Act. Haiti's 1987 constitution maintains its claim to the island, which is considered part of the department of Grand'Anse.

==== Guano mining and the Navassa Island Rebellion of 1889 ====
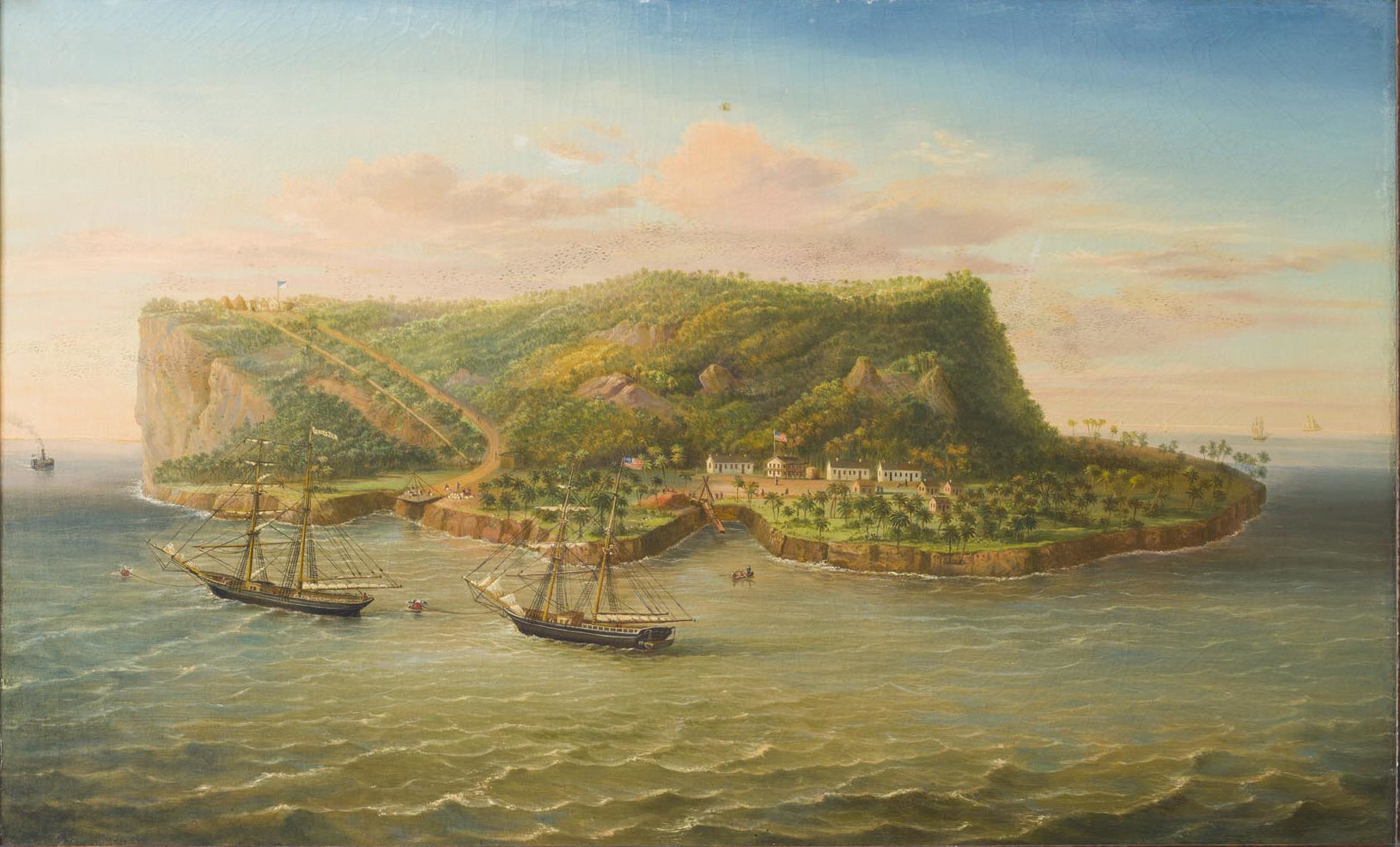
An unsigned painting of Navassa Island c. 1870 showing the brig Romance, company buildings at Lulu Town near the shore, and guano mining activity up the hillside

Guano phosphate is a superior organic fertilizer that became a mainstay of American agriculture in the mid-19th century. In November 1857, Duncan transferred his discoverer's rights to his employer, an American guano trader in Jamaica, who sold them to the newly formed Navassa Phosphate Company of Baltimore. After an interruption for the American Civil War, the company built larger mining facilities on Navassa with barrack housing for 140 black contract laborers from Maryland, houses for white supervisors, a blacksmith shop, warehouses, and a church.

Mining began in 1865. The workers dug out the guano by dynamite and pick-axe and hauled it in rail cars to the landing point at Lulu Bay, where it was put into sacks and lowered onto boats for transfer to the Company barque, the S.S. Romance. The living quarters at Lulu Bay were referred to as 'Lulu Town', as appears on old maps. Railway tracks eventually extended inland. In September 1875, the fierce 1875 Indianola hurricane swept over the island, destroying much of the company's infrastructure, including the rail line and workers' homes. In total, the storm caused an estimated $25,000 (equivalent to $730,000 in 2025) in damage on the island.

Hauling guano by muscle power in the fierce tropical heat, combined with general disgruntlement with conditions on the island, eventually contributed to a riot in 1889, in which five supervisors died. A U.S. warship returned 18 of the workers to Baltimore for three separate trials on murder charges. A black fraternal society, the Order of Galilean Fishermen, raised money to defend the miners in federal court. The defense tried to build a case on the contention that the men acted in self-defense or the heat of passion and even claimed that the United States did not have jurisdiction over the island. E. J. Waring, the first black lawyer called to the Maryland bar, was a part of the defense's legal team. The cases, including Jones v. United States, went to the U.S. Supreme Court in October 1890, which ruled the Guano Act constitutional. Three of the miners were scheduled for execution in the spring of 1891. A grass-roots petition driven by black churches around the country, also signed by white jurors from the three trials, reached President Benjamin Harrison, who mentioned the case in the 1891 State of the Union Address. Among other things, he said:

There appeared on the trial and otherwise came to me such evidences of the bad treatment of the men that in consideration of this and of the fact that the men had no access to any public officer or tribunal for protection or the redress of their wrongs I commuted the death sentences that had been passed by the court upon three of them.

Guano mining resumed on Navassa at a much-reduced level.

In 1898, during the Spanish–American War, the Phosphate Company had to abandon its operations on Navassa due to its proximity to Spanish Cuba and Puerto Rico. Company president John H. Fowler noted that the war made it impossible to find ships to deliver supplies to the island and expected his workers to be evacuated by June. Maryland senator Arthur Pue Gorman called for a naval warship to escort supply ships to the island to help evacuate workers. In July 1898, abrogating an agreement with Haitian Naval Admiral Hammerton Killick that would have allowed the Phosphate Company to withdraw equipment and supplies left on Navassa, a group of Haitians occupied the island and seized the company's assets. They were unable to operate the machinery, and mining ceased. The Navassa Phosphate Company went bankrupt and the island was sold at auction in the United States in September 1900. A dispute over the sale hampered efforts to restart mining on the island and left four contract workers virtually abandoned on Navassa from December 1900 to May 1901. Between 1857 and 1898, approximately 1 million pounds (450,000 kg) of phosphate deposits were removed from the island.

=== 1901 to present ===
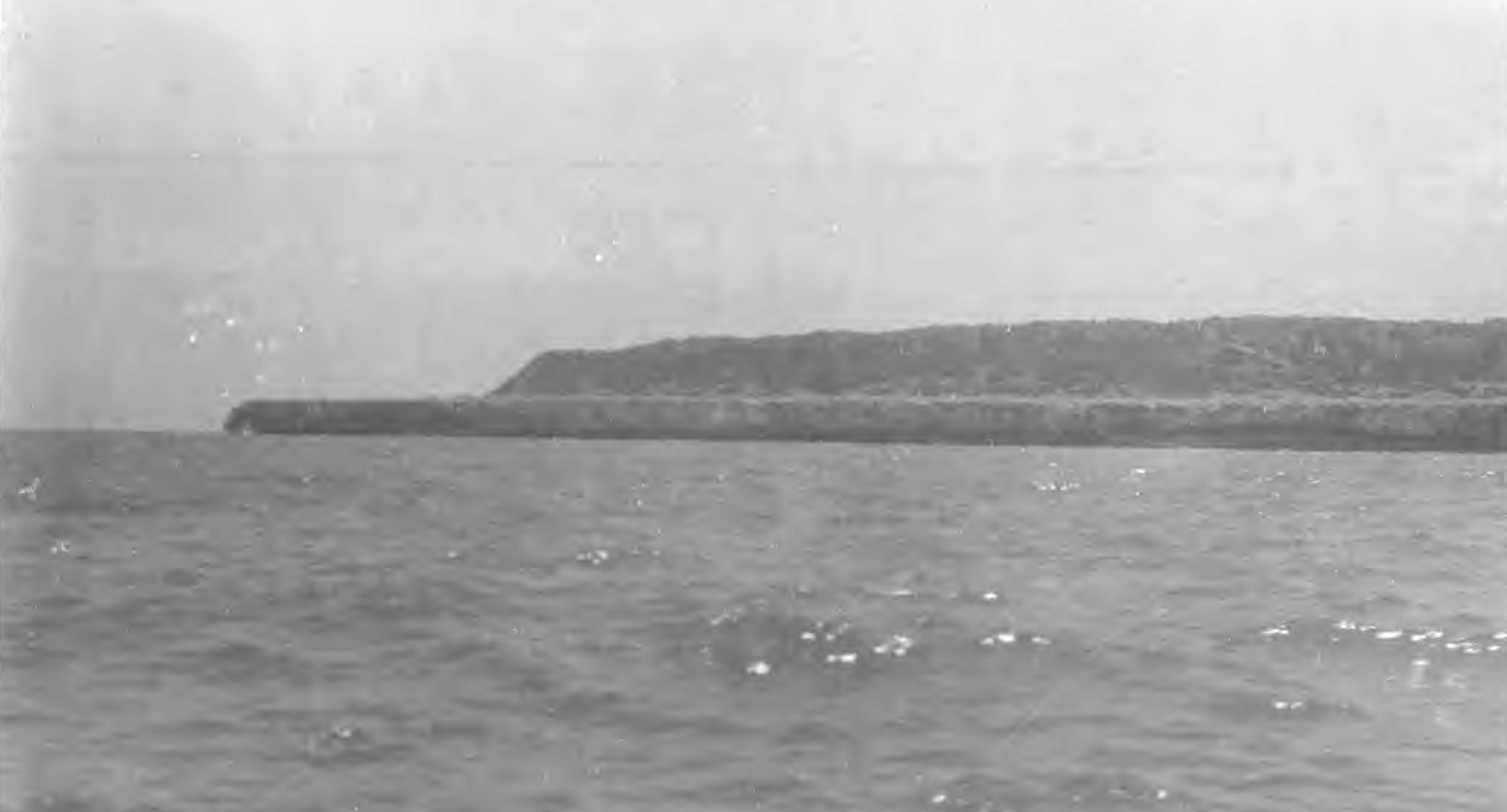
Photograph of Navassa taken May 10, 1930, from aboard the Esperanaza by Alexander Wetmore during the Parish–Smithsonian Expedition to Haiti

In 1905, the U.S. Lighthouse Service identified Navassa Island as a good location for a new lighthouse. However, plans for the light moved slowly. With the opening of the Panama Canal in 1914, shipping between the American eastern seaboard and the Canal through the Windward Passage between Cuba and Haiti increased in the area of Navassa, which proved a hazard to navigation. Congress appropriated $125,000 in 1913 to build a lighthouse on Navassa, and in 1917 the Lighthouse Service built the 162-foot (49-meter) Navassa Island Light on the island, 395 feet (120 meters) above sea level. At the same time, a wireless telegraphy station was established on the island. A keeper and two assistants were assigned to live there until the Lighthouse Service installed an automatic beacon in 1929.

After merging with the Lighthouse Service in 1939, the U.S. Coast Guard serviced the light bi-annually. The U.S. Navy set up an observation post for the duration of World War II. The island has been uninhabited since then. Fishing activities, mainly from Haiti, take place around Navassa.

As part of the Parish–Smithsonian Expedition to Haiti in 1930, Smithsonian naturalists Alexander Wetmore and Waston Perrygo stopped at Navassa to document and collect examples of the island's birds and other terrestrial and marine wildlife.

From 1917 to 1996, Navassa was under the administration of the United States Coast Guard. In 1996, the Coast Guard dismantled the light on Navassa, which ended its interest in the island. Consequently, the Department of the Interior assumed responsibility for the civil administration of the area, and placed the island under its Office of Insular Affairs. For statistical purposes, Navassa was grouped with the now-obsolete term United States Miscellaneous Caribbean Islands and is now grouped with other islands claimed by the U.S. under the Guano Islands Act as the United States Minor Outlying Islands.

In 1997, an American salvager, Bill Warren, claimed Navassa to the Department of State based on the Guano Islands Act. On March 27, 1997, the Department of the Interior rejected the claim on the basis that the Guano Islands Act applies only to islands which, at the time of the claim, are not "appertaining to" the United States. The department's opinion said that Navassa is and remains a U.S. possession "appertaining to" the United States and is "unavailable to be claimed" under the Guano Islands Act.

A 1998 scientific expedition led by the Center for Marine Conservation in Washington, D.C., described Navassa as "a unique preserve of Caribbean biodiversity." Aside from a few extinctions, the island's land and offshore ecosystems have mostly survived the 20th century.

==== National Wildlife Refuge ====
In September 1999, the United States Fish and Wildlife Service established the Navassa Island National Wildlife Refuge, which encompasses 1,344 acres (5.44 km^{2}) of land and a 12-nautical-mile (22 km; 14 mi) radius of marine habitat around the island. Later that year, full administrative responsibility for Navassa was transferred from the Office of Insular Affairs to the U.S. Fish and Wildlife Service.

The National Wildlife Refuge protects coral reef ecosystems, native wildlife, and plants and provides opportunities for scientific research on and around Navassa Island. Navassa Island features large seabird colonies, including over 5,000 nesting red-footed booby (Sula sula). Navassa is home to four endemic lizard species. Two other endemic lizards, Cyclura cornuta onchiopsis and Leiocephalus eremitus, are extinct.

Navassa Island NWR is administered as part of the Caribbean Islands National Wildlife Refuge Complex. Due to hazardous coastal conditions and to preserve species habitat, the refuge is closed to the general public, and visitors need permission from the Fish and Wildlife Service to enter its territorial waters or land.

After World War II, amateur radio operators occasionally visited to operate from the territory. Navassa is accorded "entity" (country) status by the American Radio Relay League. The callsign prefix is KP1.

Since it became a National Wildlife Refuge, amateur radio operators have repeatedly been denied entry. In October 2014, permission was granted for a two-week DX-pedition in February 2015. The operation, designated K1N, made 138,409 contacts.

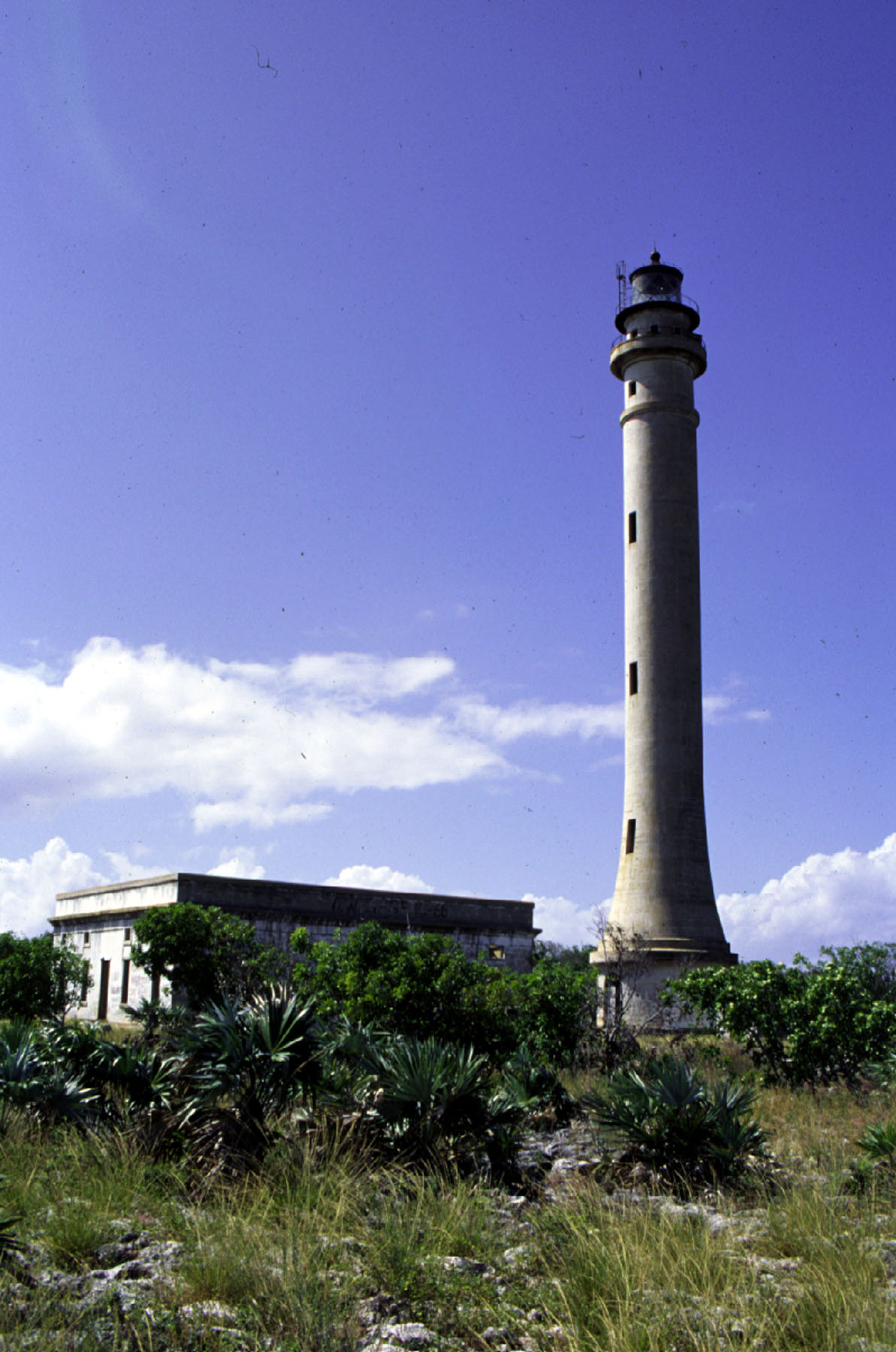
Navassa Island's lighthouse with the light keeper's quarters in the foreground

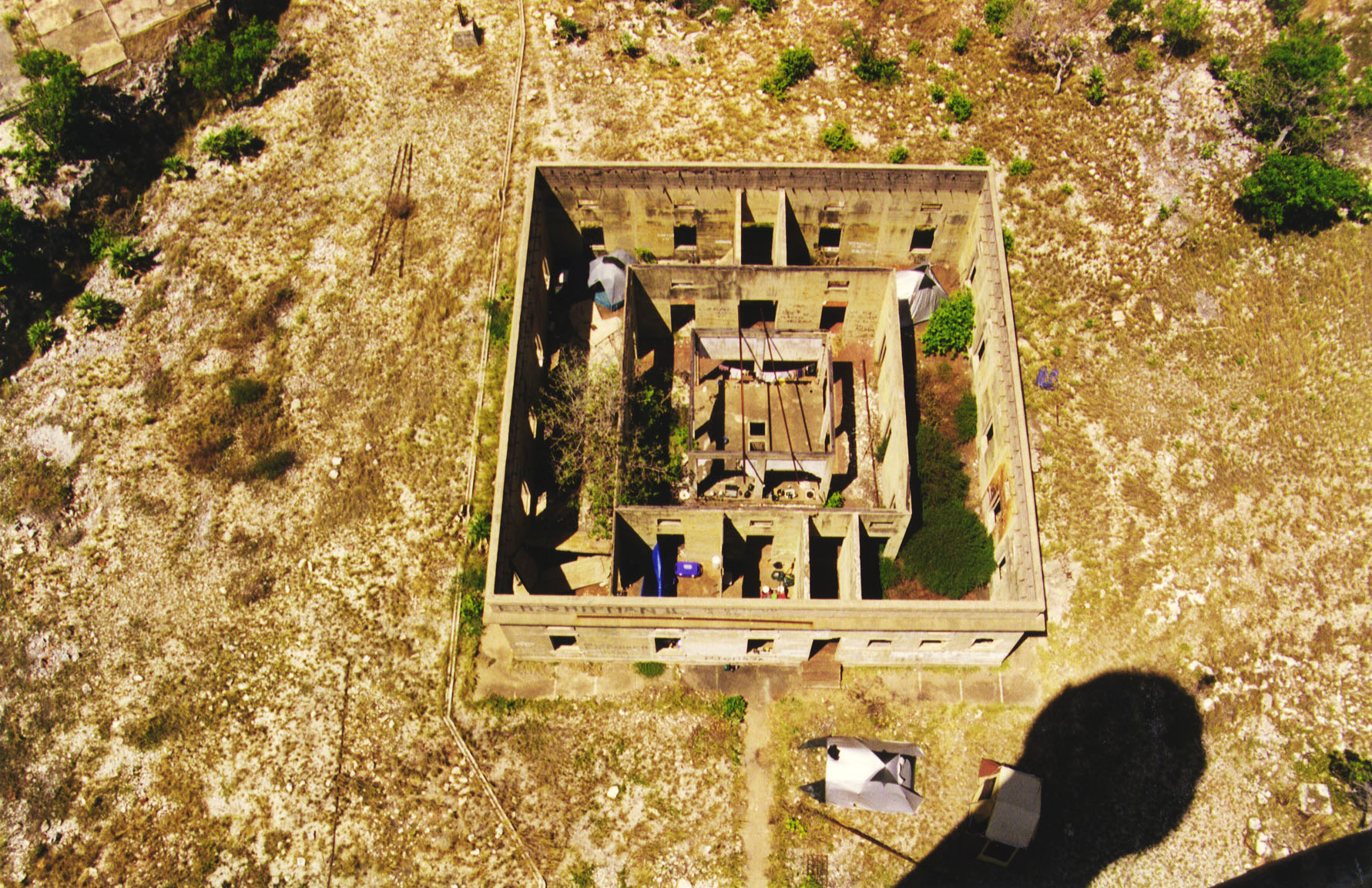
The ruins of Navassa Light keeper's quarters

== Geography, topography and ecology ==
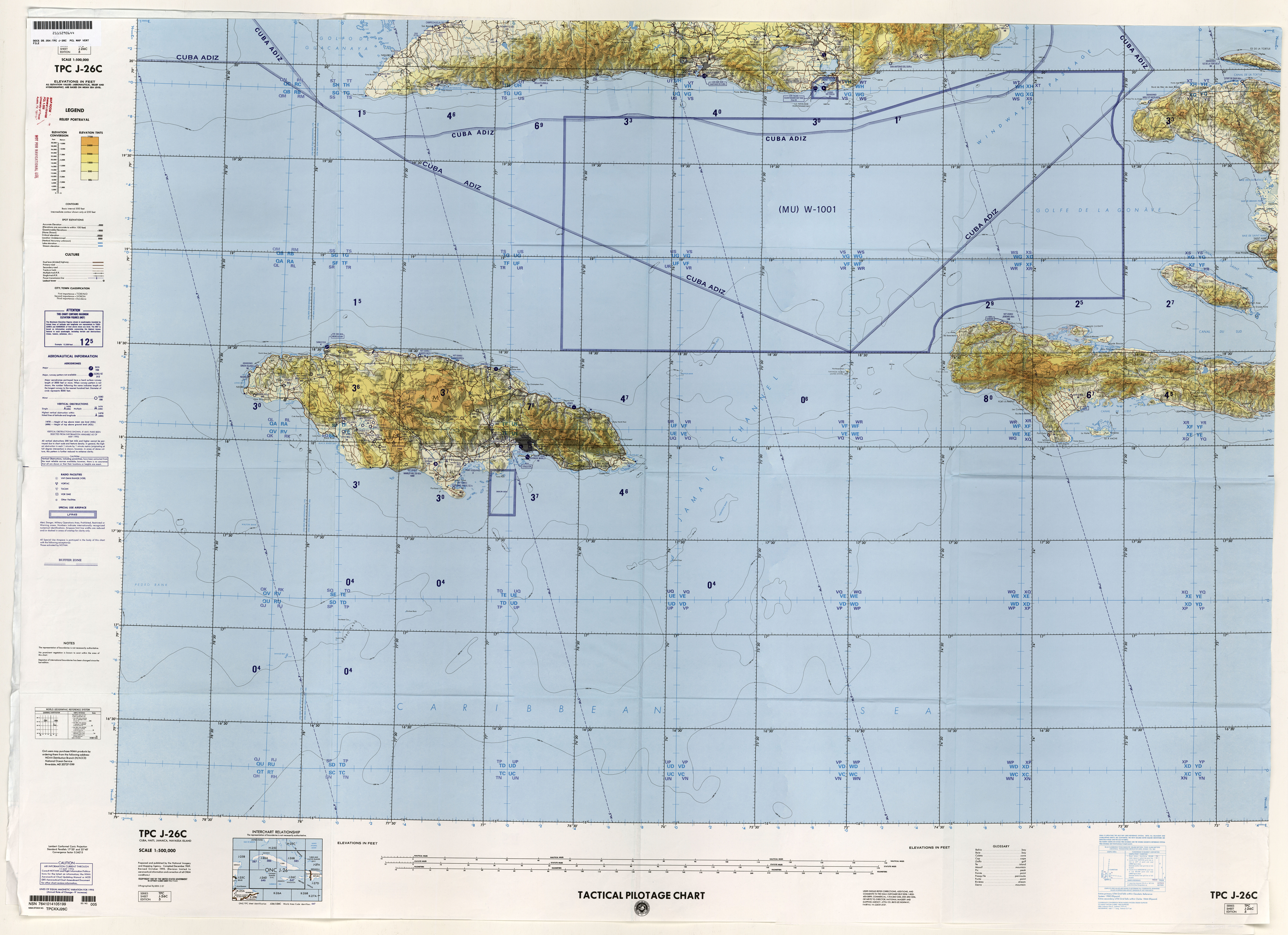
Map including Navassa Island (NIMA, 1996)

Navassa Island is about 2.1 square miles (5.4 km^{2}) in area. It is located 35 miles (56 km) west of Haiti's southwest peninsula, 103 miles (166 km) south of the U.S. naval base at Guantánamo Bay, Cuba, and about one-quarter of the way from mainland Haiti to Jamaica in the Jamaica Channel.

Navassa reaches an elevation of 250 feet (76 m) at Dunning Hill 110 yards (100 m) south of the lighthouse, Navassa Island Light. This location is 440 yards (400 m) from the southwestern coast or 655 yards (600 m) east of Lulu Bay.

The terrain of Navassa Island consists mostly of exposed coral and limestone, the island being ringed by vertical white cliffs 30 to 50 feet (9.1 to 15.2 m) high, but with enough grassland to support goat herds. The island is covered in a forest of four tree species: short-leaf fig (Ficus populnea var. brevifolia), pigeon plum (Coccoloba diversifolia), mastic (Sideroxylon foetidissimum), and poisonwood (Metopium brownei).

=== Ecology ===
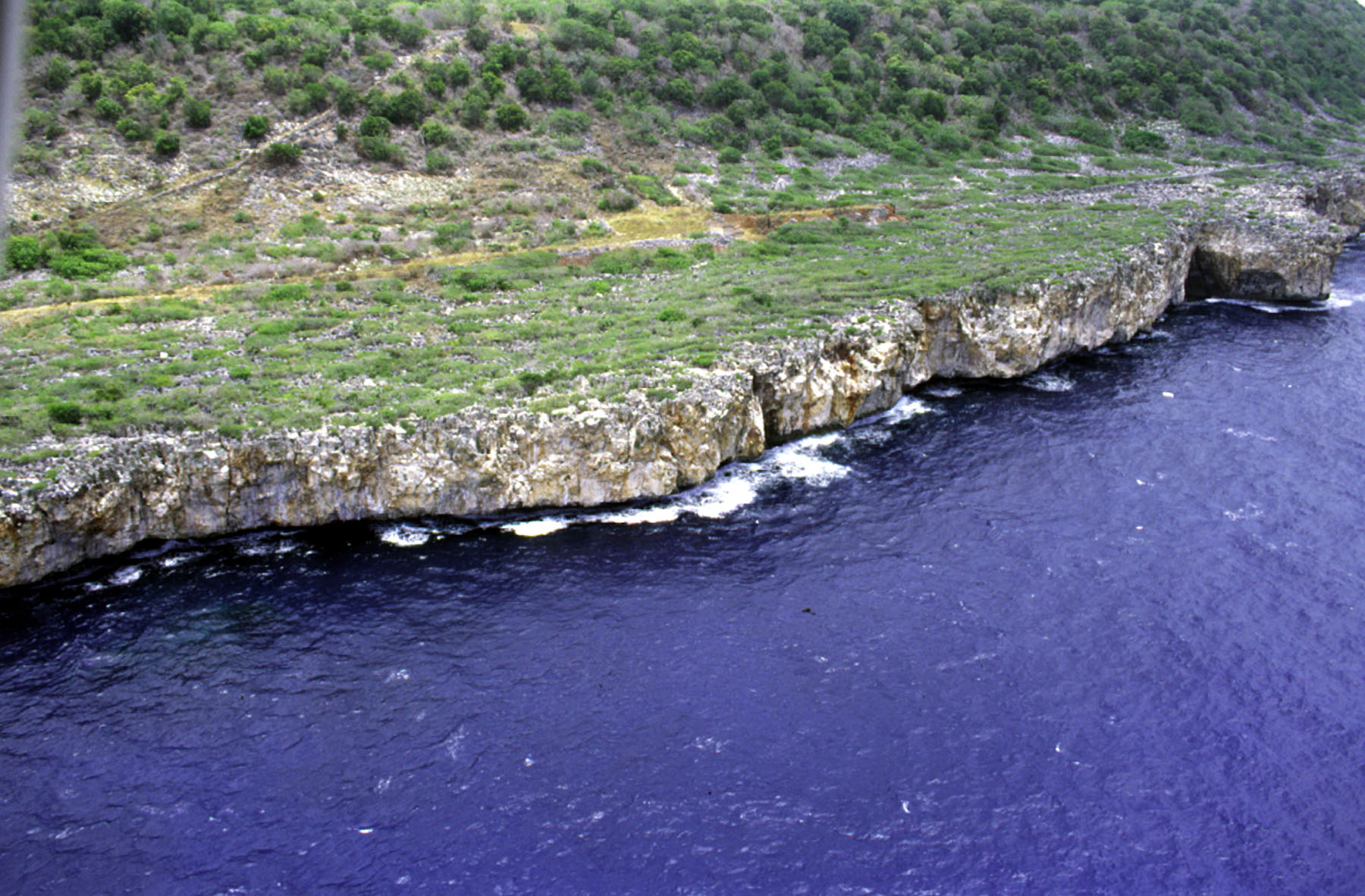
Navassa Island has a steep and rocky coastline that rings the island.

Navassa Island's topography, ecology, and modern history are similar to those of Mona Island, a small limestone island located in the Mona Passage between Puerto Rico and the Dominican Republic. These islands were once centers of guano mining and are now nature reserves for the United States.

Transient Haitian fishers and others camp on Navassa Island. Still, it is uninhabited. Navassa has no ports or harbors, only offshore anchorages, and its only natural resource is guano. Economic activity consists of subsistence fishing and commercial trawling activities. A 2009 survey of fishermen in southwestern Haiti estimated some 300 people, primarily from Anse d'Hainault Arrondissement, regularly fished near the island.

There were eight species of native reptiles, all of which are believed to be, or to have been, endemic to Navassa Island: Comptus badius (an anguid lizard), Aristelliger cochranae (a gecko), Sphaerodactylus becki (a gecko), Anolis longiceps (an anole), Cyclura cornuta onchiopsis (an endemic subspecies of the rhinoceros iguana), Leiocephalus eremitus (a curly-tailed lizard), Tropidophis bucculentus (a dwarf boa), and Typhlops sulcatus (a tiny snake). Of these, the first four remain common, with the next three likely extinct, and the last being possibly extirpated due to feral cats, dogs and pigs inhabiting the island. At least one endemic beetle species has been described from the island, Plectromerus navassae.

In 2012, Acropora palmata (elkhorn coral), a common reef-building coral of the Caribbean, was located underwater near the island. The remaining coral was found to be in good condition.

=== Birds ===
The island, with its surrounding marine waters, has been recognized as an Important Bird Area (IBA) by BirdLife International because it supports breeding colonies of red-footed boobies and magnificent frigatebirds, as well as hundreds of white-crowned pigeons.

== Maritime boundary disputes ==
The dispute has prevented the definitive delimitation of the maritime zones between the United States and Jamaica, Cuba, and Haiti, as well as determining the maritime frontier at the point of confluence between Jamaica, Cuba, and Haiti. The island was disregarded for the purposes of determining equidistant boundary calculation with Cuba during the signing of the Cuba–Haiti Maritime Boundary Agreement in 1977. Cuba backs Haiti's claim to the island.

== See also ==
- List of Guano Island claims
- United States and the United Nations Convention on the Law of the Sea
