= Guano =

Excrement of seabirds or bats

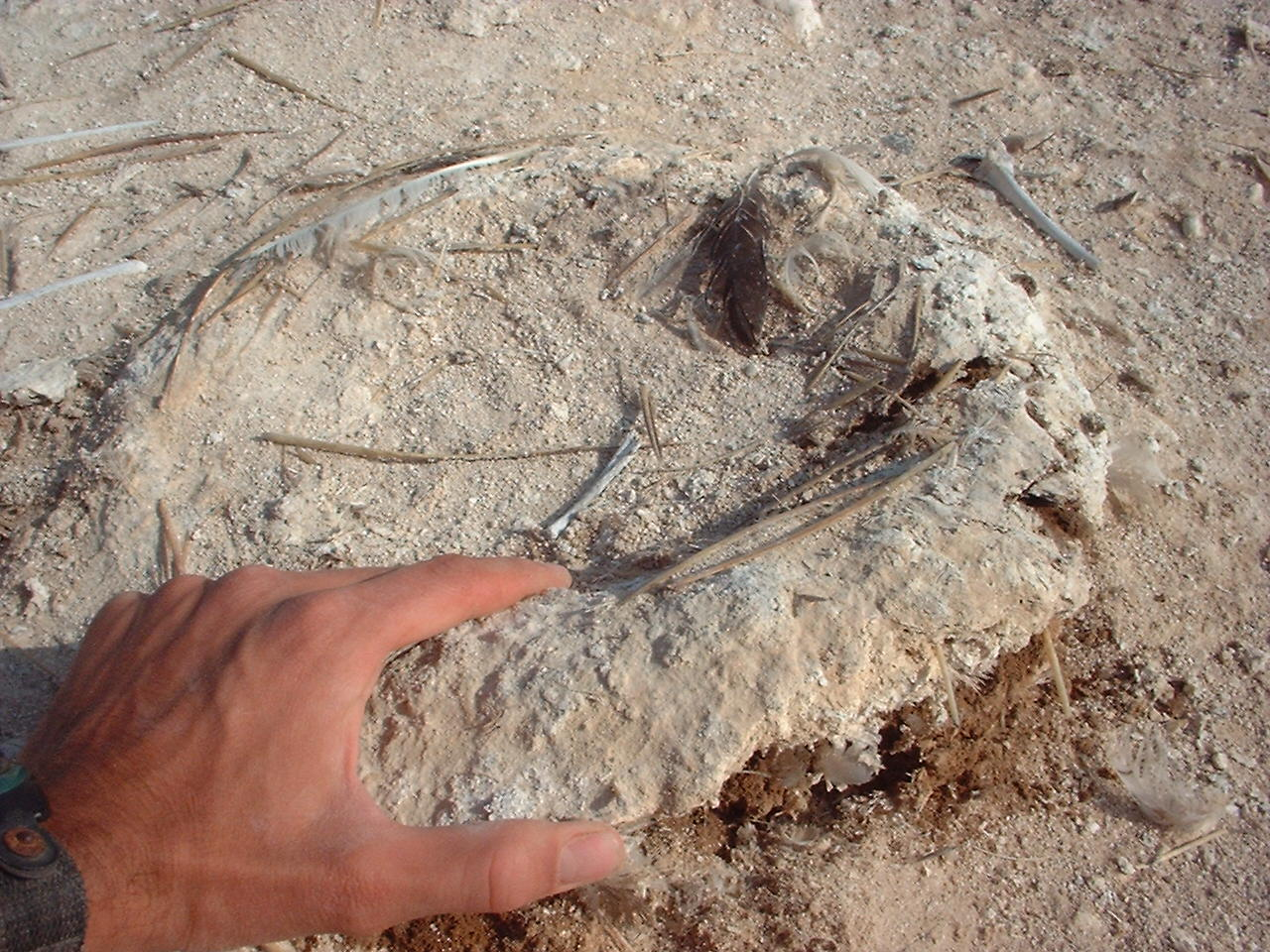
The nest of the Peruvian booby is made of almost pure guano.

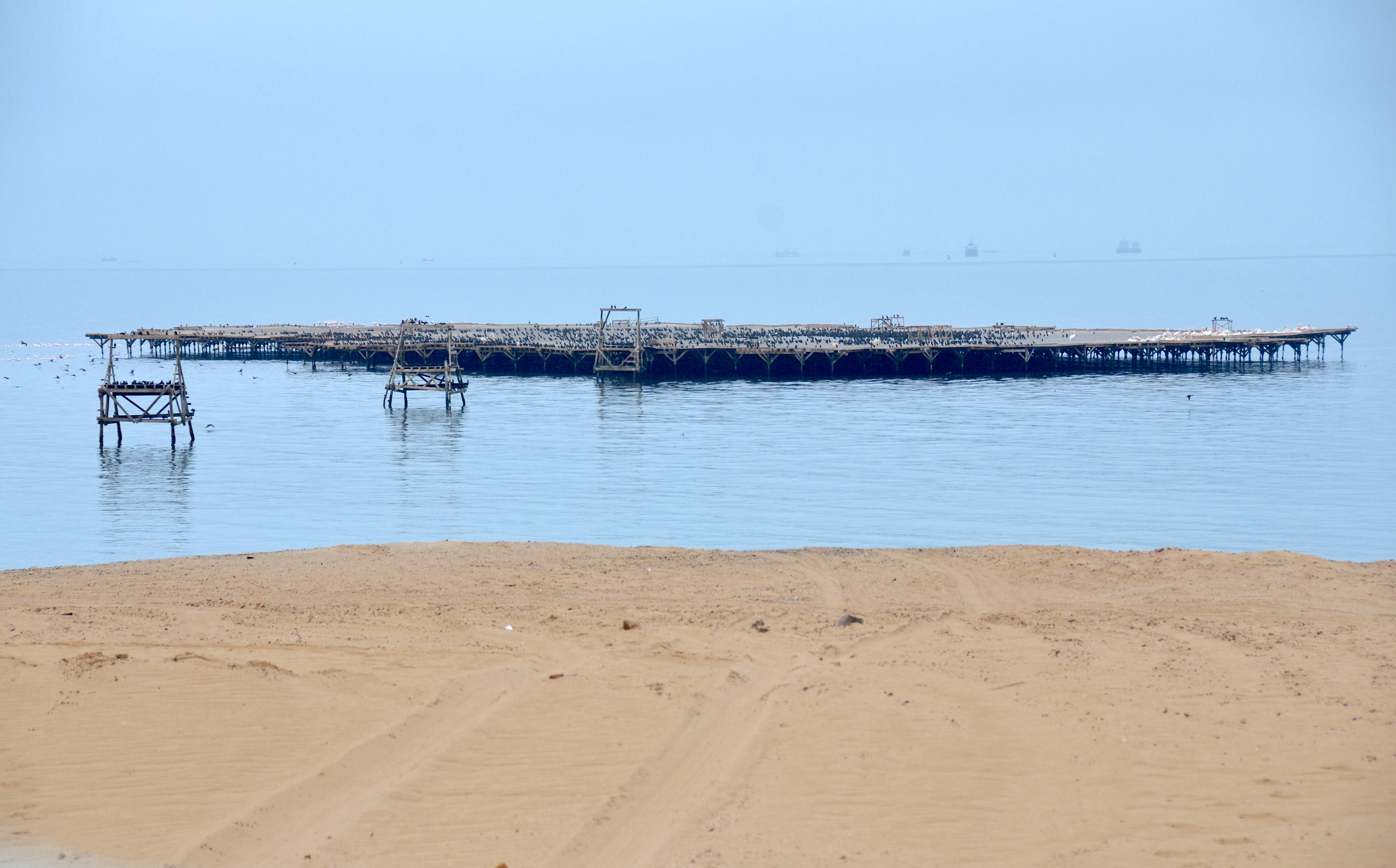
Human-made Guano Island near Walvis Bay in Namibia

Guano (Spanish from Quechua: wanu) is the accumulated excrement of seabirds or bats. Guano is a highly effective fertiliser due to the high content of nitrogen, phosphate, and potassium, all key nutrients essential for plant growth. Guano was also, to a lesser extent, sought for the production of gunpowder and other explosive materials.

The 19th-century seabird guano trade played a pivotal role in the development of modern input-intensive farming. The demand for guano spurred the human colonisation of remote bird islands in many parts of the world.

Unsustainable seabird guano mining processes have resulted in permanent habitat destruction and the loss of millions of seabirds.

Bat guano is found in caves throughout the world. Many cave ecosystems are wholly dependent on bats to provide nutrients via their guano which supports bacteria, fungi, invertebrates, and vertebrates. The loss of bats from a cave can result in the extinction of species that rely on their guano. Unsustainable harvesting of bat guano may cause bats to abandon their roost.

Demand for guano rapidly declined after 1910 with the development of the Haber–Bosch process for extracting nitrogen from the atmosphere.

Guano mining continues in Chile with the annual guano production in Chile ranging from 2,091 to 4,601 metric tons per year in the 2014–2023 period.

== Composition and properties ==
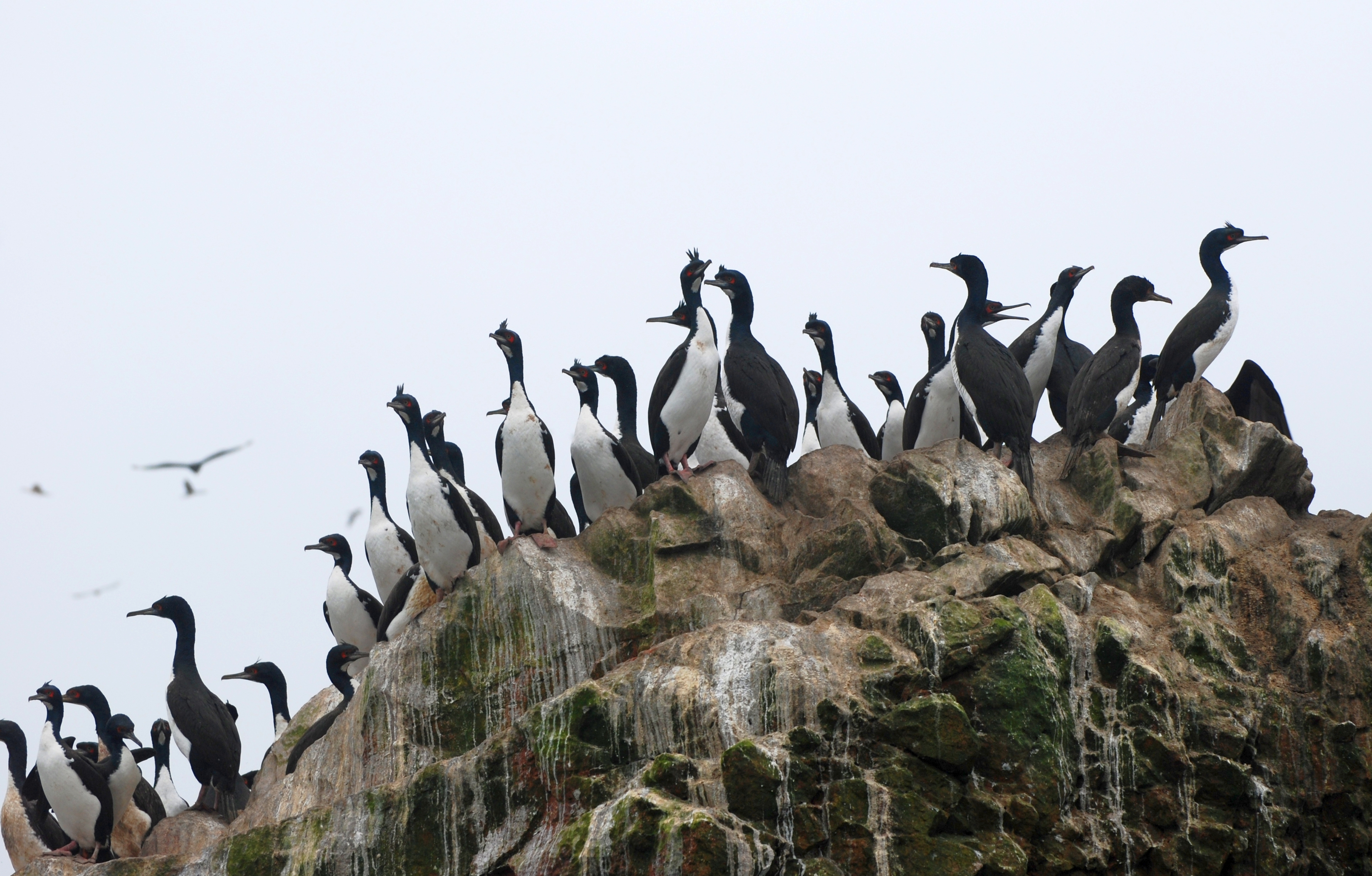
The guanay cormorant has historically been the most important producer of guano.

=== Seabird guano ===
Seabird guano is the fecal excrement from marine birds and has an organic matter content greater than 40%, and is a source of nitrogen (N) and available phosphate (P_{2}O_{5}).

=== Bat guano ===
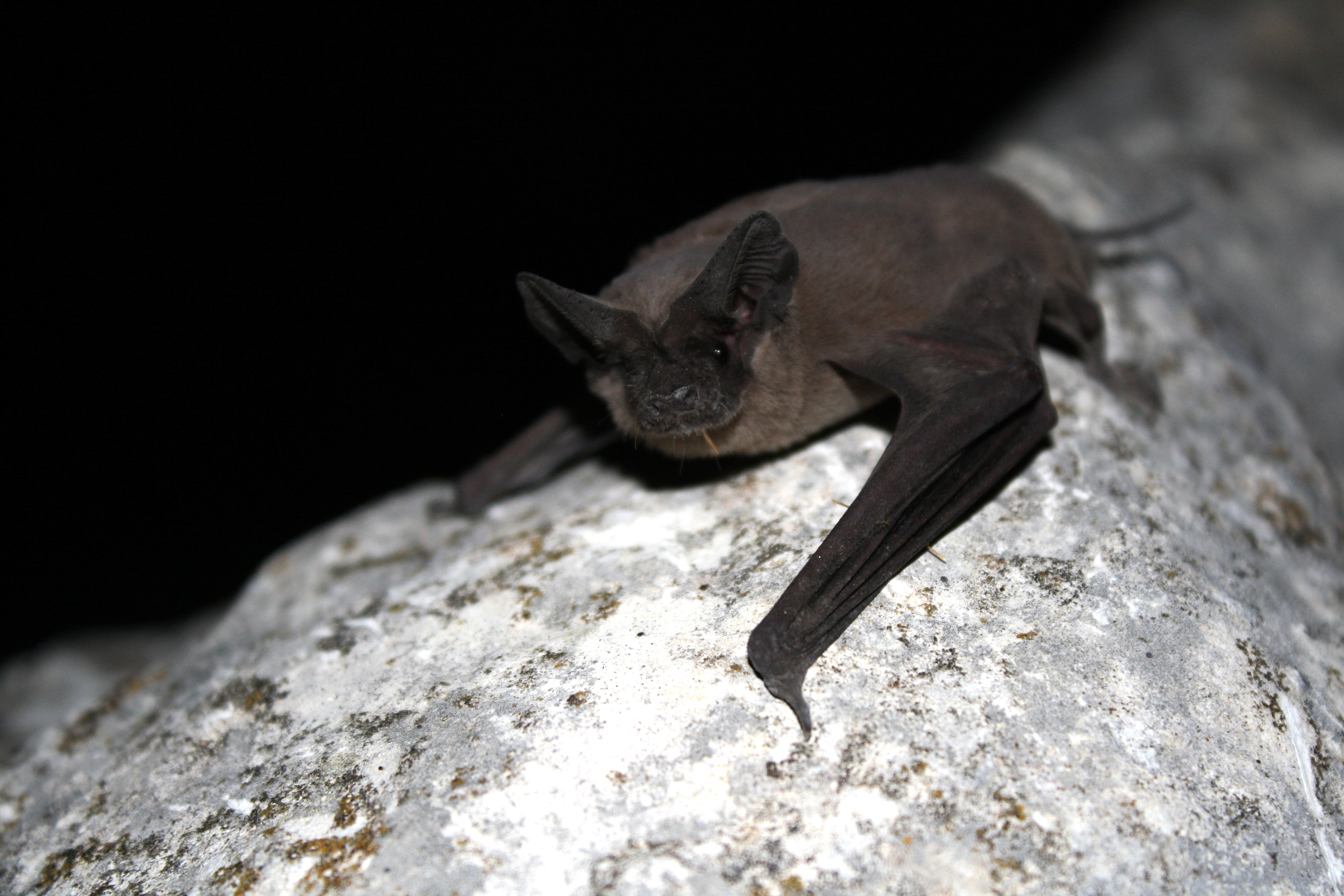
Insectivorous bats, such as this Mexican free-tailed bat, have historically been the most important producers of bat guano.

Bat guano is partially decomposed bat excrement and has an organic matter content greater than 40%; it is a source of nitrogen, and may contain up to 6% available phosphate (P_{2}O_{5}).

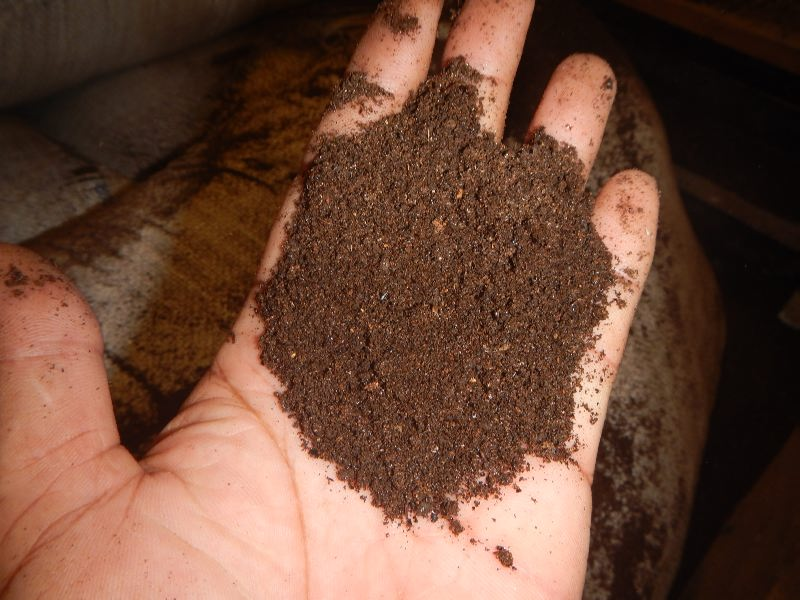
Raw insectivorous bat guano

The feces of insectivorous bats consists of fine particles of insect exoskeleton, which are largely composed of chitin. Elements found in large concentrations include nitrogen, phosphorus, potassium and trace elements needed for plant growth. Bat guano is slightly alkaline with an average pH of 7.25. "The pH of the bat guano varies not only with age and storage conditions but also with the diet of bats": frugivorous bats have neutral to alkaline guano; insectivorous bats have acid guano.

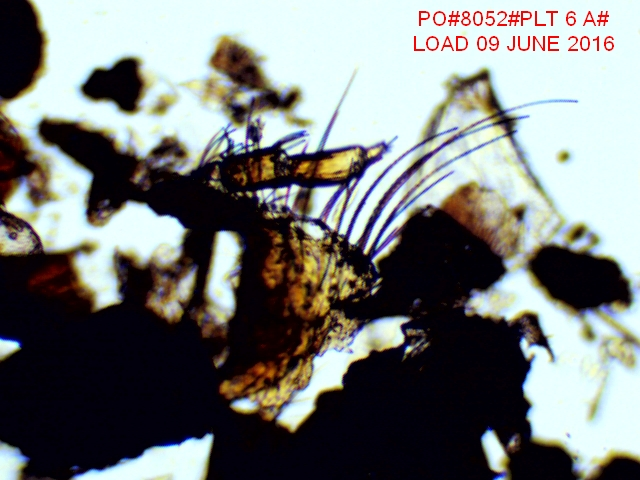
Bat guano under a microscope reveals tiny particles of insect exoskeletons, which are mostly chitin.

== History of human use ==
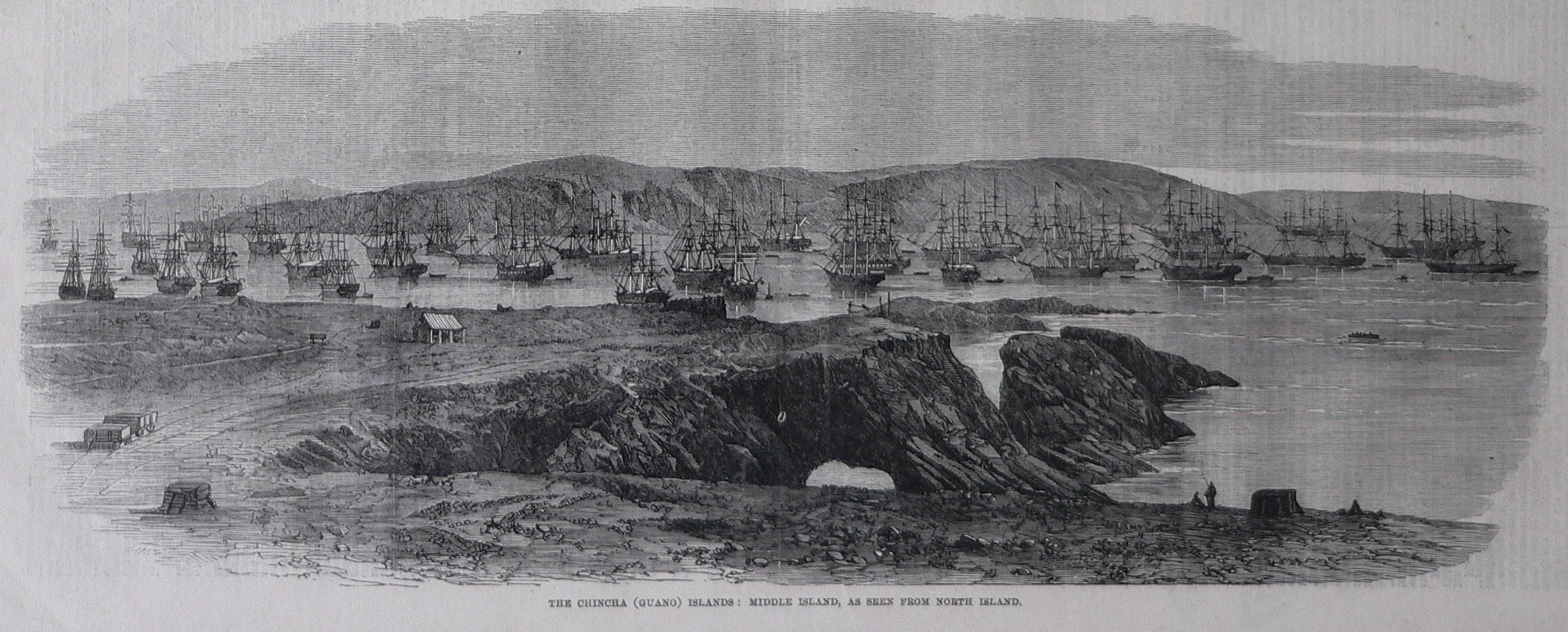
Chincha Islands where guano was found in abundance. Mining was done on site and ships transported it to Europe.

=== Bird guano ===
==== Indigenous use ====
The word "guano" originates from the Andean language Quechua, in which it refers to any form of dung used as an agricultural fertiliser. Archaeological evidence suggests that Andean people collected seabird guano from small islands and points off the desert coast of Peru for use as a soil amendment and perhaps as long as 5,000 years. Spanish colonial documents suggest that the rulers of the Inca Empire greatly valued guano, restricted access to it, and punished any disturbance of the birds with death. The guanay cormorant is historically the most abundant and important producer of guano. Other important guano-producing bird species off the coast of Peru are the Peruvian pelican and the Peruvian booby.

==== Western discovery (1548–1800) ====
The earliest European records noting the use of guano as fertiliser date back to 1548.

Although the first shipments of guano reached Spain as early as 1700, it did not become a popular product in Europe until the 19th century.

==== The Guano Age (1802–1884) ====
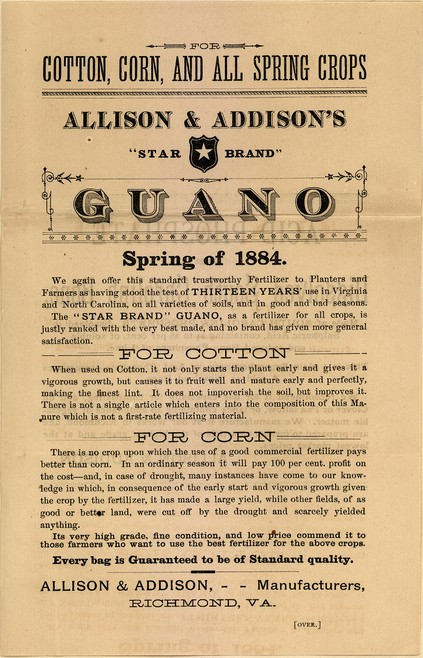
Advertisement for guano, 1884

In November 1802, Prussian geographer and explorer Alexander von Humboldt first encountered guano and began investigating its fertilising properties at Callao in Peru, and his subsequent writings on this topic made the subject well known in Europe. Although Europeans knew of its fertilising properties, guano was not widely used before this time. Cornish chemist Humphry Davy delivered a series of lectures which he compiled into an 1813 bestselling book about the role of nitrogenous manure as a fertiliser, Elements of Agricultural Chemistry. It highlighted the special efficacy of Peruvian guano, noting that it made the "sterile plains" of Peru fruitful. Though Europe had marine seabird colonies and thus, guano, it was of poorer quality because its potency was leached by high levels of rainfall and humidity. Elements of Agricultural Chemistry was translated into German, Italian, and French; American historian Wyndham D. Miles said that it was likely "the most popular book ever written on the subject, outselling the works of Dundonald, Chaptal, Liebig..." He also said that "No other work on agricultural chemistry was read by as many English-speaking farmers."

The arrival of commercial whaling on the Pacific coast of South America contributed to scaling of its guano industry. Whaling vessels carried consumer goods to Peru such as textiles, flour, and lard; unequal trade meant that ships returning north were often half empty, leaving entrepreneurs in search of profitable goods that could be exported. In 1840, Peruvian politician and entrepreneur Francisco Quirós y Ampudia negotiated a deal to commercialise guano export among a merchant house in Liverpool, a group of French businessmen, and the Peruvian government. This agreement resulted in the abolition of all preexisting claims to Peruvian guano; thereafter, it was the exclusive resource of the State. By nationalising its guano resources, the Peruvian government could collect royalties on their sale, which became the country's largest source of revenue. Some of this income was used by the State to free its more than 25,000 black slaves and to abolish the head tax on its Indians. This export of guano from Peru to Europe has been suggested as the vehicle that brought a virulent strain of potato blight from the Andean highlands that began the Great Famine of Ireland.

Soon guano was sourced from regions besides Peru. By 1846, 462,057 tonnes (509,331 short tons) of guano had been exported from Ichaboe Island, off the coast of Namibia, and surrounding islands to Great Britain. Guano pirating took off in other regions as well, causing prices to plummet and more consumers to try it. The biggest markets for guano from 1840–1879 were in Great Britain, the Low Countries, Germany, and the United States.

By the late 1860s, it became apparent that Peru's most productive guano site, the Chincha Islands, was nearing depletion. This caused guano mining to shift to other islands farther north and south. Despite this near exhaustion, Peru achieved its greatest ever export of guano in 1870 at more than 700,000 tonnes (770,000 short tons). Concern of exhaustion was ameliorated by the discovery of a new Peruvian resource: sodium nitrate, also called Chile saltpetre. After 1870, the use of Peruvian guano as a fertiliser was eclipsed by Chile saltpetre in the form of caliche (a sedimentary rock) extraction from the interior of the Atacama Desert, close to the guano areas.

The Guano Age ended with the War of the Pacific (1879–1883), which saw Chilean marines invade coastal Bolivia to claim its guano and saltpetre resources. Knowing that Bolivia and Peru had a mutual defense agreement, Chile mounted a preemptive strike on Peru, resulting in its occupation of the Tarapacá, which included Peru's guano islands. With the Treaty of Ancón of 1884, the War of the Pacific ended. Bolivia ceded its entire coastline to Chile, which also gained half of Peru's guano income from the 1880s and its guano islands. The conflict ended with Chilean control over the most valuable nitrogen resources in the world. Chile's national treasury grew by 900% between 1879 and 1902 thanks to taxes coming from the newly acquired lands.

==== Imperialism ====
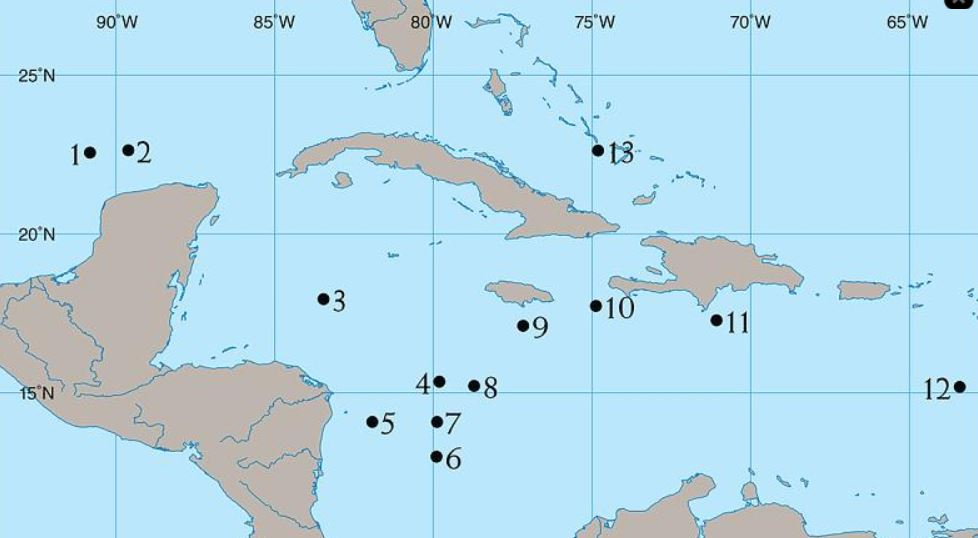
Islands claimed by U.S. via the 1856 Guano Islands Act in the Atlantic
1. Arenas Keys
2. Alacranes Island
3. Swan Islands
4. Serranilla Keys
5. Quita Sueño Island
6. Roncador Island
7. Serraña Key
8. Petrel Island
9. Morant Keys
10. Navassa Island
11. Alta Vela Island
12. Aves Island
13. Verd Key

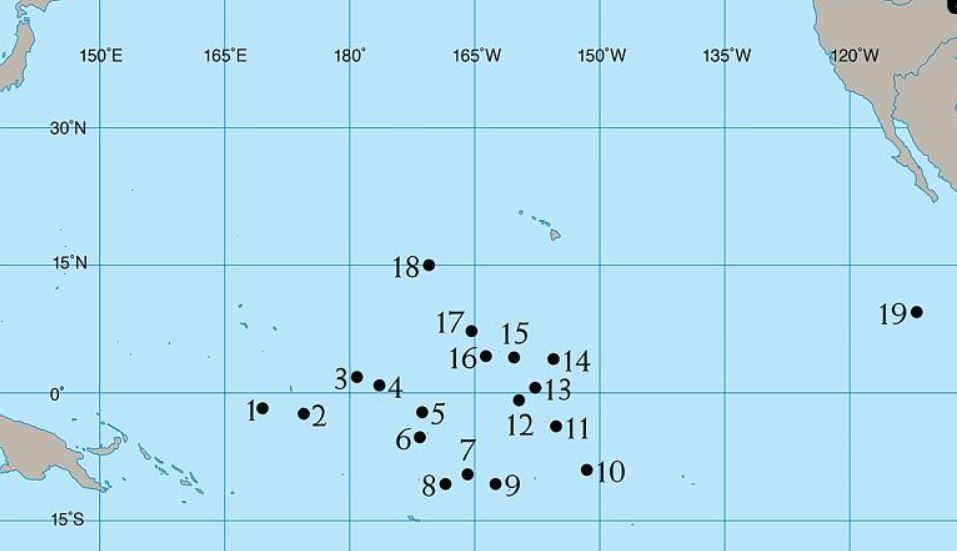
Islands claimed by U.S. via the 1856 Guano Islands Act in the Pacific
1. Enderbury Island
2. McKean Island
3. Howland Island
4. Baker Island
5. Canton Island
6. Phoenix Islands
7. Dangerous Islands
8. Swains Atoll
9. Flint Island
10. Caroline Island
11. Maidens Island
12. Jarvis Island
13. Christmas Atoll
14. Starbuck Island
15. Fanning Island
16. Palmyra Island
17. Kingman Reef
18. Johnston Atoll
19. Clipperton Island

The demand for guano led the United States to pass the Guano Islands Act in 1856, which gave U.S. citizens discovering a source of guano on an unclaimed island exclusive rights to the deposits. In 1857, the U.S. began annexing uninhabited islands in the Pacific and Caribbean, totaling nearly 100, though some islands claimed under the Act did not end up having guano mining operations established on them. Several of these islands remain U.S. territories. Conditions on annexed guano islands were poor for workers, resulting in an 1889 rebellion on Navassa Island, where black workers killed their white overseers. In defending the workers, lawyer Everett J. Waring argued that the men could not be tried by U.S. law because the guano islands were not legally part of the country. The case went to the Supreme Court of the United States where it was decided in Jones v. United States (1890). The Court decided that Navassa Island and other guano islands were legally part of the U.S. American historian Daniel Immerwahr claimed that by establishing these land claims as constitutional, the Court laid the "basis for the legal foundation for the U.S. empire".

Other countries also used their desire for guano as a reason to expand their empires. The United Kingdom claimed Kiritimati and Malden Island for the British Empire. Others nations that claimed guano islands included Australia, France, Germany, Hawaii, Japan, and Mexico.

==== Decline and resurgence ====
In 1913, a factory in Germany began the first large-scale synthesis of ammonia using German chemist Fritz Haber's catalytic process. The scaling of this energy-intensive process meant that farmers could cease practices such as crop rotation with nitrogen-fixing legumes or the application of naturally derived fertilisers such as guano. The international trade of guano and nitrates such as Chile saltpetre declined as artificially synthesised fertilisers became more widely used. With the rising popularity of organic food in the twenty-first century, the demand for guano has started to rise again.

=== Bat guano ===
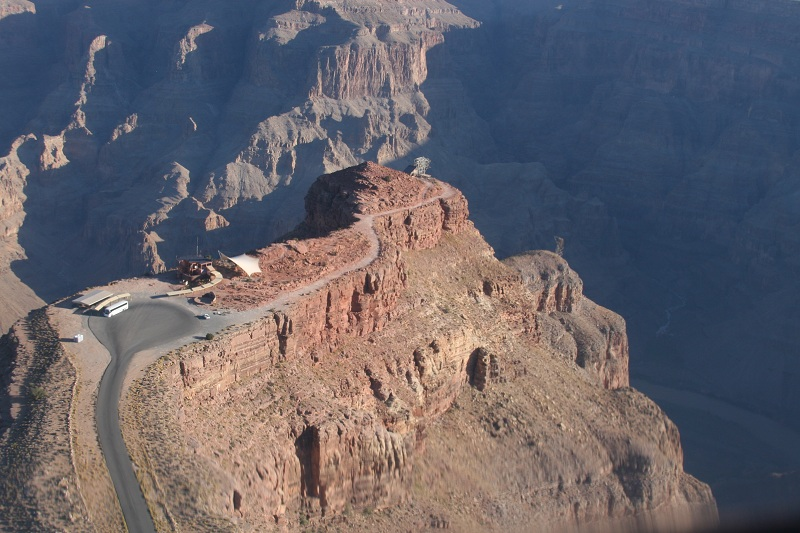
Aerial view of Guano Point. Old tramway headhouse is at the end of dirt road (right). Second tramway tower is more clearly visible, on skyline to right. Bat Cave mine is 760 m (2,500 ft) below, across the canyon.

In the U.S., bat guano was harvested from caves as early as the 1780s to manufacture gunpowder. During the American Civil War (1861–1865), the Union's blockade of the southern Confederate States of America forced the Confederacy to rely on guano mined from caves to produce saltpetre. One Confederate guano kiln in New Braunfels, Texas, had a daily output of 100 lb (45 kg) of saltpetre, produced from 2,500 lb (1,100 kg) of guano from two area caves.

From the 1930s, Bat Cave mine in Arizona was used for guano extraction, though it cost more to develop than it was worth. U.S. Guano Corporation bought the property in 1958 and invested $3.5 million to make it operational; actual guano deposits in the cave were 1% of predicted and the mine was abandoned in 1960.

In Australia, the first documented claim on Naracoorte's Bat Cave guano deposits was in 1867. Guano mining in the country remained a localised and small industry. In modern times, bat guano is used in low levels in developed countries. It remains an important resource in developing countries, particularly in Asia.

Bat guano is used in traditional Chinese medicine, where it is known as Faeces Vespertilionis (夜明砂; yèmíngshā; 'Night-bright sand'). The guano is washed of its sediment and impurities then dried, and the resulting compound is prescribed for eye conditions, infantile malnutrition, scrofula, and malaria. With the outbreak of the COVID-19 pandemic, concerns were raised about this TCM practice considering the likely role of bats as hosts of a range of coronaviruses including the SARS-CoV-2 which causes COVID-19. China cracked down on the wildlife trade in response to the pandemic in 2020, and Chinese-language media reports that a propriety medicine was delisted from the Pharmacopoeia of the People's Republic of China in the same year due to its use of Faeces Vespertilionis.

==== Paleoenvironment reconstruction ====
Coring accumulations of bat guano can be useful in determining past climate conditions. The level of rainfall, for example, impacts the relative frequency of nitrogen isotopes. In times of higher rainfall, ^{15}N is more common. Bat guano also contains pollen, which can be used to identify prior plant assemblages. A layer of charcoal recovered from a guano core in the U.S. state of Alabama was seen as evidence that a Woodlands tribe inhabited the cave for some time, leaving charcoal via the fires they lit. Stable isotope analysis of bat guano was also used to support that the climate of the Grand Canyon was cooler and wetter during the Pleistocene epoch than it is now in the Holocene. Additionally, the climatic conditions were more variable in the past.

== Mining ==
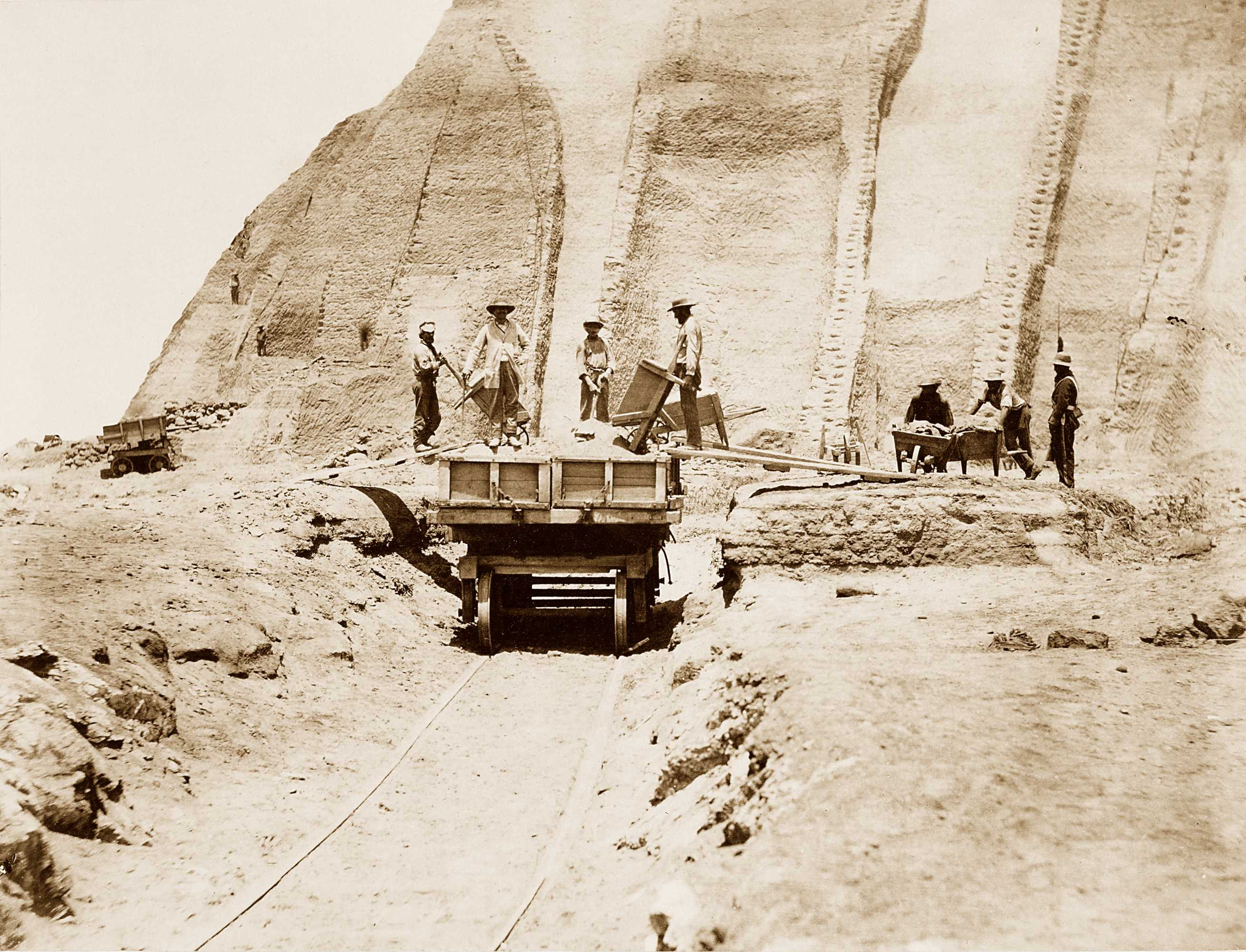
Workers load guano onto a cart in 1865

=== Process ===
Mining seabird guano from Peruvian islands has remained largely the same since the industry began, relying on manual labour. First, picks, brooms, and shovels are used to loosen the guano. The use of excavation machinery is not only impractical due to the terrain but also prohibited because it would frighten the seabirds. The guano is then placed in sacks and carried to sieves, where impurities are removed.

Similarly, harvesting bat guano in caves was and is manual. In Puerto Rico, cave entrances were enlarged to facilitate access and extraction. Guano was freed from the rocky substrate by explosives. Then, it was shoveled into carts and removed from the cave. From there, the guano was taken to kilns to dry. The dried guano would then be loaded into sacks, ready for transport via ship. Today, bat guano is usually harvested in the developing world, using "strong backs and shovels".

=== Ecological impacts and mitigation ===
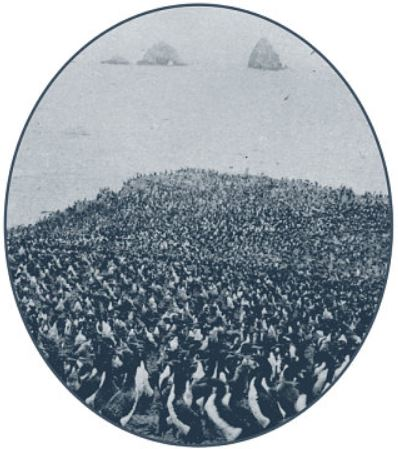
A large colony of guanay cormorants on South Chincha Island of Peru in 1907

==== Bird guano ====
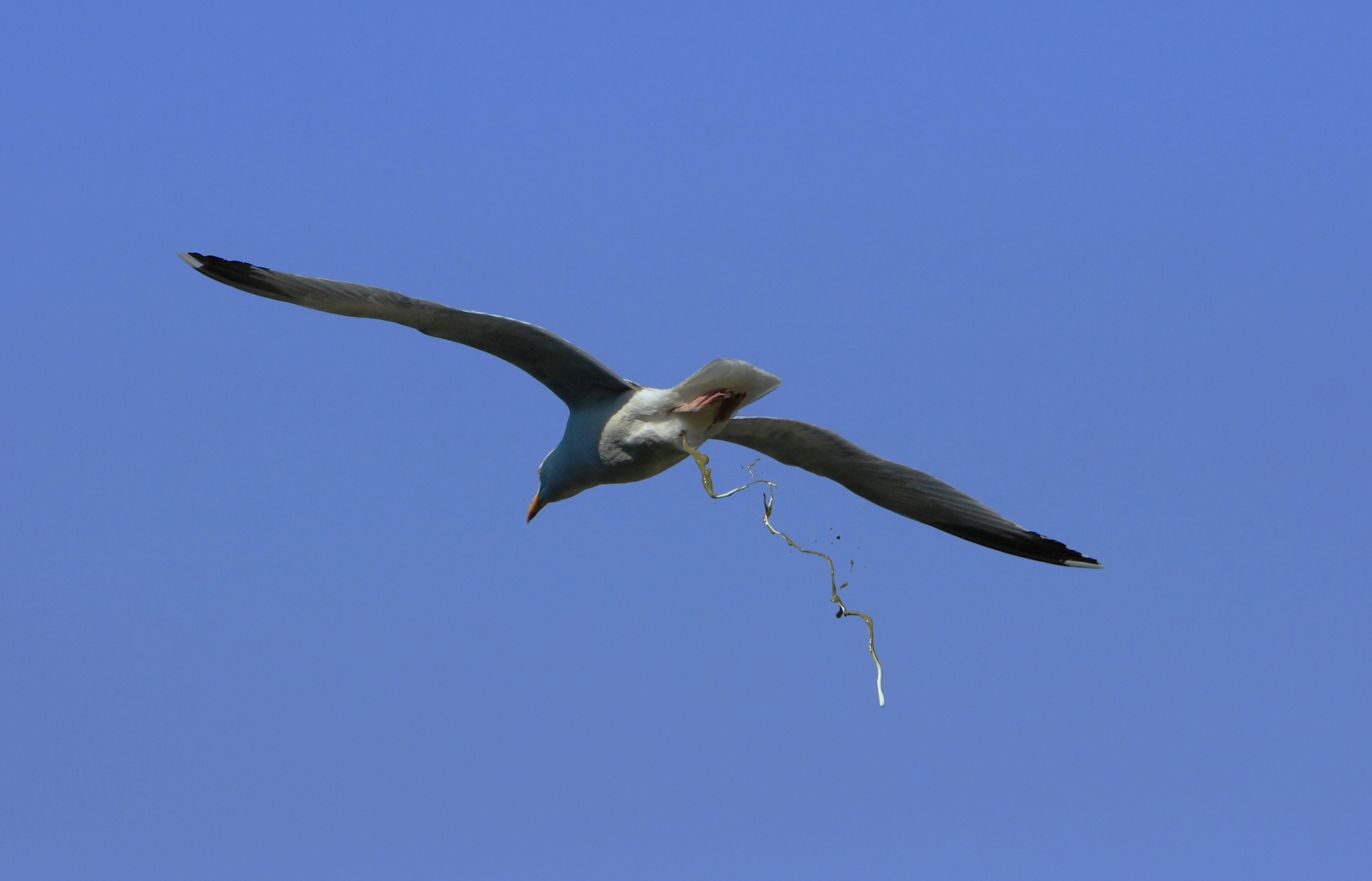
A herring gull (Larus argentatus) excreting waste near Île-de-Bréhat.

Peru's guano islands experienced severe ecological effects as a result of unsustainable mining. In the late 1800s, approximately 53 million seabirds lived on the twenty-two islands. As of 2011, only 4.2 million seabirds lived there. After realising the depletion of guano in the Guano Age, the Peruvian government recognised that it needed to conserve the seabirds. In 1906, American zoologist Robert Ervin Coker was hired by the Peruvian government to create management plans for its marine species, including the seabirds. Specifically, he made five recommendations:

1. That the government turn its coastal islands into a state-run bird sanctuary. Private use of the island for hunting or egg collecting should be prohibited.
2. To eliminate unhealthy competition, each island should be assigned only one state contractor for guano extraction.
3. Guano mining should be entirely ceased from November to March so that the breeding season for the birds was undisturbed.
4. In rotation, each island should be closed to guano mining for an entire year.
5. The Peruvian government should monopolise all processes related to guano production and distribution. This recommendation was made with the assumption that a single entity with a vested interest in the long-term success of the guano industry would manage the resource most responsibly.

Despite these policies, the seabird population continued to decline, which was exacerbated by the 1911 El Niño–Southern Oscillation. In 1913, Scottish ornithologist Henry Ogg Forbes authored a report on behalf of the Peruvian Corporation focusing on how human actions harmed the birds and subsequent guano production. Forbes suggested additional policies to conserve the seabirds, including keeping unauthorised visitors a mile away from guano islands at all times, eliminating all the birds' natural predators, maintaining armed patrols on the islands, and decreasing the frequency of harvest on each island to once every three to four years. In 2009, these conservation efforts culminated in the establishment of the Guano Islands, Isles, and Capes National Reserve System, which consists of twenty-two islands and eleven capes. This Reserve System was the first marine protected area in South America, encompassing 140,833 hectares (348,010 acres).

==== Bat guano ====
Unlike bird guano which is deposited on the surface of islands, bat guano can be deep within caves. Cave structure is often altered via explosives or excavation to facilitate extraction of the guano, which changes the cave's microclimate. Bats are sensitive to cave microclimate, and such changes can cause them to abandon the cave as a roost, as happened when Robertson Cave in Australia had a hole opened in its ceiling for guano harvesting. Guano harvesting may also introduce artificial light into caves; one cave in the U.S. state of New Mexico was abandoned by its bat colony after the installation of electric lights.

In addition to harming bats by necessitating they find another roost, guano harvesting techniques can ultimately harm human livelihood as well. Harming or killing bats means that less guano will be produced, resulting in unsustainable harvesting practices. In contrast, sustainable harvesting practices do not negatively impact bat colonies nor other cave fauna. The International Union for Conservation of Nature's (IUCN) 2014 recommendations for sustainable guano harvesting include extracting guano when the bats are not present, such as when migratory bats are gone for the season or when non-migratory bats are out foraging at night.

=== Work conditions ===
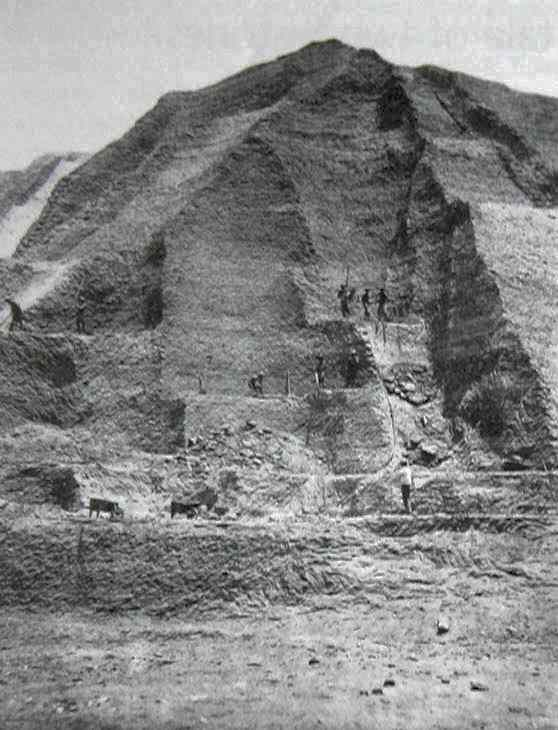
Chinese labourers stand on a partially extracted guano deposit in the Chincha Islands in 1865

Guano mining in Peru was at first done with black slaves. After Peru abolished slavery, it sought another source of cheap labour. In the 1840s and 1850s, thousands of men were blackbirded (coerced or kidnapped) from the Pacific islands and southern China. Thousands of coolies from South China worked as "virtual slaves" mining guano. By 1852, Chinese labourers comprised two-thirds of Peru's guano miners; others who mined guano included convicts and forced labourers paying off debts. Chinese labourers agreed to work for eight years in exchange for passage from China, though many were misled that they were headed to California's gold mines. Conditions on the guano islands were very poor, commonly resulting in floggings, unrest, and suicide. Workers experienced lung damage by inhaling guano dust, were buried alive by falling piles of guano, and risked falling into the ocean. After visiting the guano islands, U.S. politician George Washington Peck wrote:

I observed Coolies shoveling and wheeling as if for dear life and yet their backs were covered with great welts...It is easy to distinguish Coolies who have been at the islands a short time from the new comers. They soon become emaciated and their faces have a wild desparing expression. That they are worked to death is as apparent as that the hack horses in our cities are used up in the same manner.

Hundreds or thousands of Pacific Islanders, especially Native Hawaiians, traveled or were blackbirded to the U.S.-held and Peruvian guano islands for work, including Howland Island, Jarvis Island, and Baker Island. While most Hawaiians were literate, they could usually not read English; the contract they received in their own language lacked key amendments that the English version had. Because of this, the Hawaiian language contract was often missing key information, such as the departure date, the length of the contract, and the name of the company for which they would be working. When they arrived at their destination to begin mining, they learned that both contracts were largely unenforced in terms of work conditions. Instead, their overseer (commonly referred to as a luna), who was usually white, had nearly unlimited power over them. Wages varied from lows of $5/month to highs of $14/month. Native Hawaiian labourers of Jarvis Island referred to the island as Paukeaho, meaning "out of breath" or "exhausted", due to the strain of loading heavy bags of guano onto ships. Pacific Islanders also risked death: one in thirty-six labourers from Honolulu died before completing his contract. Slaves blackbirded from Easter Island in 1862 were repatriated by the Peruvian government in 1863; only twelve of 800 slaves survived the journey.

On Navassa Island, the guano mining company switched from white convicts to largely black labourers after the American Civil War. Black labourers from Baltimore claimed that they were misled into signing contracts with stories of mostly fruit-picking, not guano mining, and "access to beautiful women". Instead, the work was exhausting and punishments were brutal. Labourers were frequently placed in stocks or tied up and dangled in the air. A labour revolt ensued, where the workers attacked their overseers with stones, axes, and even dynamite, killing five overseers.

Although the process for mining guano is mostly the same today, worker conditions have improved. As of 2018, guano miners in Peru made US$750 per month, which is more than twice the average national monthly income of $300. Workers also have health insurance, meals, and eight-hour shifts.

== Human health ==
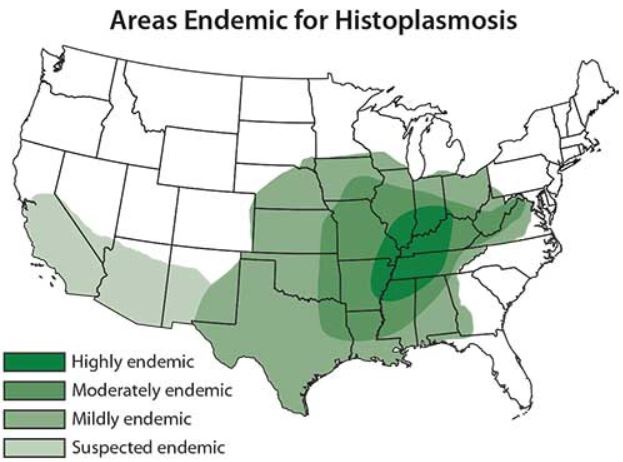
Histoplasmosis endemism map for the U.S.

Guano is one of the habitats of the fungus Histoplasma capsulatum, which can cause the disease histoplasmosis in humans, cats, and dogs. H. capsulatum grows best in the nitrogen-rich conditions present in guano. In the United States, histoplasmosis affects 3.4 adults per 100,000 over age 65, with higher rates in the Midwestern United States (6.1 cases per 100,000). In addition to the United States, H. capsulatum is found in Central and South America, Africa, Asia, and Australia. Of 105 outbreaks in the U.S. from 1938–2013, seventeen occurred after exposure to a chicken coop while nine occurred after exposure to a cave. Birds or their droppings were present in 56% of outbreaks, while bats or their droppings were present in 23%. Developing any symptoms after exposure to H. capsulatum is very rare; less than 1% of those infected develop symptoms. Only patients with more severe cases require medical attention, and only about 1% of acute cases are fatal. It is a much more serious illness for the immunocompromised, however. Histoplasmosis is the first symptom of HIV/AIDS in 50–75% of patients, and results in death for 39–58% of those with HIV/AIDS. The Centers for Disease Control and Prevention recommends that the immunocompromised avoid exploring caves or old buildings, cleaning chicken coops, or disturbing soil where guano is present.

Rabies, which can affect humans who have been bitten by infected mammals including bats, cannot be transmitted through bat guano. A 2011 study of bat guano viromes in the U.S. states of Texas and California recovered no viruses that are pathogenic to humans, nor any close relatives of pathogenic viruses. It is hypothesised that Egyptian fruit bats, which are native to Africa and the Middle East, can spread Marburg virus to each other through contact with infected secretions such as guano, but a 2018 review concluded that more studies are necessary to determine the specific mechanisms of exposure that cause Marburg virus disease in humans. Exposure to guano could be a route of transmission to humans.

As early as in the 18th century there are reports of travellers complaining about the unhealthy air of Arica and Iquique resulting from abundant bird spilling.

== Ecological importance ==
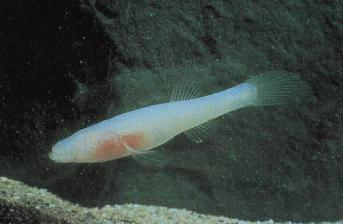
The Ozark cavefish, a species that depends on bat guano as a source of food.

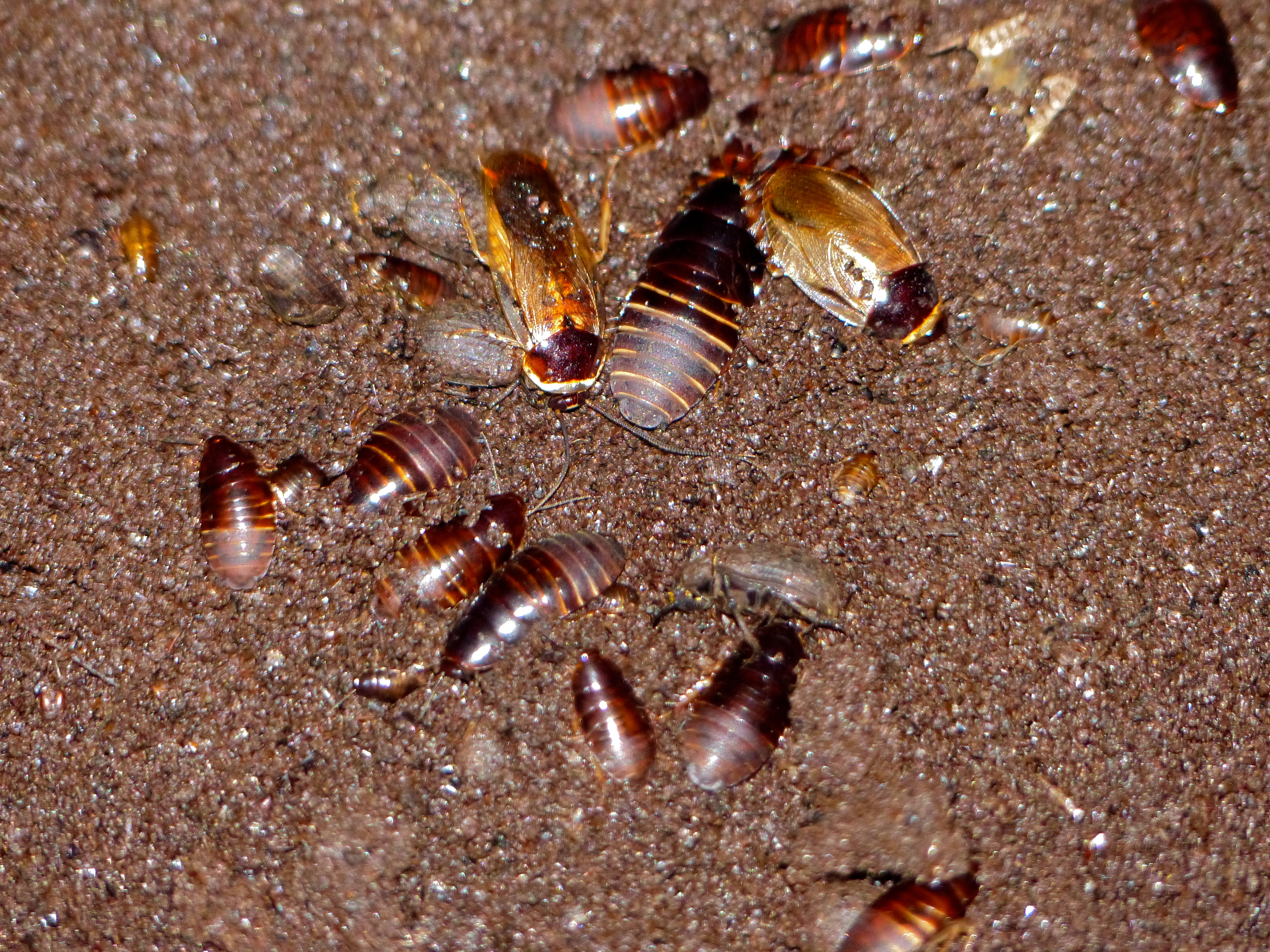
Cave cockroaches on guano

Colonial birds and their guano deposits have an outsized role on the surrounding ecosystem. Bird guano stimulates productivity, though species richness may be lower on guano islands than islands without the deposits. Guano islands have a greater abundance of detritivorous beetles than islands without guano. The intertidal zone is inundated by the guano's nutrients, causing algae to grow more rapidly and coalesce into algal mats. These algal mats are in turn colonised by invertebrates. The abundance of nutrients offshore of guano islands also supports coral reef ecosystems.

Cave ecosystems are often limited by nutrient availability. Bats bring nutrients into these ecosystems via their excretions, however, which are often the dominant energy resource of a cave. Many cave species depend on bat guano for sustenance, directly or indirectly. Because cave-roosting bats are often highly colonial, they can deposit substantial quantities of nutrients into caves. The largest colony of bats in the world at Bracken Cave (about 20 million individuals) deposit 50,000 kg (110,000 lb) of guano into the cave every year. Even smaller colonies have relatively large impacts, with one colony of 3,000 gray bats annually depositing 9 kg (20 lb) of guano into their cave.

Invertebrates inhabit guano piles, including fly larvae, nematodes, springtails, beetles, mites, pseudoscorpions, thrips, silverfish, moths, harvestmen, spiders, isopods, millipedes, centipedes, and barklice. The invertebrate communities associated with the guano depends on the bat species' feeding guild: frugivorous bat guano has the greatest invertebrate diversity. Some invertebrates feed directly on the guano, while others consume the fungi that use it as a growth medium. Predators such as spiders depend on guano to support their prey base. Vertebrates consume guano as well, including the bullhead catfish and larvae of the grotto salamander.

Bat guano is integral to the existence of endangered cave fauna. The critically endangered Shelta Cave crayfish feeds on guano and other detritus. The Ozark cavefish, a U.S. federally listed species, also consumes guano. The loss of bats from a cave can result in declines or extinctions of other species that rely on their guano. A 1987 cave flood resulted in the death of its bat colony; the Valdina Farms salamander is now likely extinct as a result.

Bat guano also has a role in shaping caves by making them larger. It has been estimated that 70–95% of the total volume of Gomantong cave in Borneo is due to biological processes such as guano excretion, as the acidity of the guano weathers the rocky substrate. The presence of high densities of bats in a cave is predicted to cause the erosion of 1 metre (3 ft) of rock over 30,000 years.

== Cultural significance ==
There are several references to guano in the arts. In his 1845 poem "Guanosong", German author Joseph Victor von Scheffel used a humorous verse to take a position in the popular polemic against Hegel's Naturphilosophie. The poem starts with an allusion to Heinrich Heine's Lorelei and may be sung to the same tune. The poem ends, however, with the blunt statement of a Swabian rapeseed farmer from Böblingen who praises the seagulls of Peru as providing better manure even than his fellow countryman Hegel. This refuted the widespread Enlightenment belief that nature in the New World was inferior to the Old World. The poem has been translated by, among others, Charles Godfrey Leland.

English author Robert Smith Surtees parodied the obsession of wealthy landowners with the "religion of progress" in 1843. In one of his works featuring the character John Jorrocks, Surtees has the character develop an obsession with trying all the latest farming experiments, including guano. In an effort to impress the upper class around him and disguise his low-class origins, Jorrocks references guano in conversation at every chance he can. At one point, he exclaims, "Guano!" along with two other varieties of fertiliser, to which the Duke replies, "I see you understand it all!"

Guano is also the namesake for one of the nucleobases in RNA and DNA: guanine, a purine base, consisting of a fused pyrimidine-imidazole planar ring system with conjugated double bonds. Guanine was first obtained from guano by Julius Bodo Unger, who incorrectly first described it as xanthine, a closely related purine, in 1844. After he was corrected by Einbrodt two years later, Bodo Unger agreed and published it with the new name of "guanine" in 1846.

== See also ==
- Chicken manure – Feces of chickens used as an organic fertilizer, especially for soil low in nitrogen
- Human uses of bats
- Phosphorite – Sedimentary rock containing large amounts of phosphate minerals
- Uric acid – Organic compound

== Bibliography ==
- Cushman, Gregory T. (2005). "'The Most Valuable Birds in the World': International Conservation Science and the Revival of Peru's Guano Industry, 1909―1965". Environmental History. 10 (3): 477–509. doi:10.1093/envhis/10.3.477. hdl:1808/11737.
- Cushman, Gregory T. (2013). Guano and the Opening of the Pacific World: a Global Ecological History. Cambridge: Cambridge University Press. doi:10.1017/CBO9781139047470. ISBN 978-1-107-00413-9.
