= Peaceable possession =

Concept in property law

In real estate and real property law, peaceable possession is "holding property without any adverse claim to possession or title by another".

Quiet title is used to refer to the new owner's peaceable possession. Property title, or ownership, also includes possession, but is a greater property right than the latter. Therefore, peaceable possession may also refer to a tenant's, or lessee's, warranty of Quiet enjoyment, or require such for a quiet title action.

Cotenants take property together in peaceable possession. Peaceable possession is sometimes defined in the negative, that is, a trespasser lacks it.
