= Title 48 of the United States Code =

U.S. federal statutes on insular areas

Title 48 of the United States Code outlines the role of United States territories and insular areas in the United States Code.

- Chapter 1: Bureau of Insular Affairs
- Chapter 2: Alaska
- Chapter 3: Hawaii
- Chapter 4: Puerto Rico
- Chapter 5: Philippine Islands
- Chapter 6: Panama Canal Zone
- Chapter 7: Virgin Islands
- Chapter 8: Guano Islands
- Chapter 8a: Guam
- Chapter 9: Samoa, Tutuila, Manua, Swains Island, and Trust Territory of the Pacific Islands
- Chapter 10: Territorial Provisions of a General Nature
- Chapter 11: Alien Owners of Land
- Chapter 12: Virgin Islands
- Chapter 13: Eastern Samoa
- Chapter 14: Trust Territory of the Pacific Islands
- Chapter 15: Conveyance of Submerged Lands to Territories
- Chapter 16: Delegates to Congress
- Chapter 17: Northern Mariana Islands
- Chapter 18: Micronesia, Marshall Islands, and Palau
- Chapter 19: Pacific Policy Reports
- Chapter 20: PROMESA
