= List of United States Supreme Court cases, volume 137 =

Supreme Court of the United States
- Interactive map of Supreme Court of the United States
- 38°53′26″N 77°00′16″W
- Established: March 4, 1789; 236 years ago
- Location: Washington, D.C.
- Coordinates: 38°53′26″N 77°00′16″W
- Composition method: Presidential nomination with Senate confirmation
- Authorised by: Constitution of the United States, Art. III, § 1
- Judge term length: life tenure, subject to impeachment and removal
- Number of positions: 9 (by statute)
- Website: supremecourt.gov

This is a list of cases reported in volume 137 of United States Reports, decided by the Supreme Court of the United States in 1890 and 1891.

== Justices of the Supreme Court at the time of volume 137 U.S. ==
The Supreme Court is established by Article III, Section 1 of the Constitution of the United States, which says: "The judicial Power of the United States, shall be vested in one supreme Court . . .". The size of the Court is not specified; the Constitution leaves it to Congress to set the number of justices. Under the Judiciary Act of 1789 Congress originally fixed the number of justices at six (one chief justice and five associate justices). Since 1789 Congress has varied the size of the Court from six to seven, nine, ten, and back to nine justices (always including one chief justice).

When the cases in volume 137 U.S. were decided the Court comprised the following nine members:

Portrait	Justice	Office	Home State	Succeeded	Date confirmed by the Senate (Vote)	Tenure on Supreme Court
	Melville Fuller	Chief Justice	Illinois	Morrison Waite	July 20, 1888 (41–20)	October 8, 1888 – July 4, 1910 (Died)
	Stephen Johnson Field	Associate Justice	California	newly created seat	March 10, 1863 (Acclamation)	May 10, 1863 – December 1, 1897 (Retired)
	Joseph P. Bradley	Associate Justice	New Jersey	newly created seat	March 21, 1870 (46–9)	March 23, 1870 – January 22, 1892 (Died)
	John Marshall Harlan	Associate Justice	Kentucky	David Davis	November 29, 1877 (Acclamation)	December 10, 1877 – October 14, 1911 (Died)
	Horace Gray	Associate Justice	Massachusetts	Nathan Clifford	December 20, 1881 (51–5)	January 9, 1882 – September 15, 1902 (Died)
	Samuel Blatchford	Associate Justice	New York	Ward Hunt	March 22, 1882 (Acclamation)	April 3, 1882 – July 7, 1893 (Died)
	Lucius Quintus Cincinnatus Lamar	Associate Justice	Mississippi	William Burnham Woods	January 16, 1888 (32–28)	January 18, 1888 – January 23, 1893 (Died)
	David Josiah Brewer	Associate Justice	Kansas	Stanley Matthews	December 18, 1889 (53–11)	January 6, 1890 – March 28, 1910 (Died)
	Henry Billings Brown	Associate Justice	Michigan	Samuel Freeman Miller	December 29, 1890 (Acclamation)	January 5, 1891 – May 28, 1906 (Retired)

== Citation style ==
Under the Judiciary Act of 1789 the federal court structure at the time comprised District Courts, which had general trial jurisdiction; Circuit Courts, which had mixed trial and appellate (from the US District Courts) jurisdiction; and the United States Supreme Court, which had appellate jurisdiction over the federal District and Circuit courts—and for certain issues over state courts. The Supreme Court also had limited original jurisdiction (i.e., in which cases could be filed directly with the Supreme Court without first having been heard by a lower federal or state court). There were one or more federal District Courts and/or Circuit Courts in each state, territory, or other geographical region.

The Judiciary Act of 1891 created the United States Courts of Appeals and reassigned the jurisdiction of most routine appeals from the district and circuit courts to these appellate courts. The Act created nine new courts that were originally known as the "United States Circuit Courts of Appeals." The new courts had jurisdiction over most appeals of lower court decisions. The Supreme Court could review either legal issues that a court of appeals certified or decisions of court of appeals by writ of certiorari. The change resulted in an immediate reduction in the Supreme Court's workload (from 623 cases filed in 1890 to 379 in 1891 and 275 in 1892).

Bluebook citation style is used for case names, citations, and jurisdictions.

- "# Cir." = United States Court of Appeals
  - e.g., "3d Cir." = United States Court of Appeals for the Third Circuit
- "C.C.D." = United States Circuit Court for the District of . . .
  - e.g.,"C.C.D.N.J." = United States Circuit Court for the District of New Jersey
- "D." = United States District Court for the District of . . .
  - e.g.,"D. Mass." = United States District Court for the District of Massachusetts
- "E." = Eastern; "M." = Middle; "N." = Northern; "S." = Southern; "W." = Western
  - e.g.,"C.C.S.D.N.Y." = United States Circuit Court for the Southern District of New York
  - e.g.,"M.D. Ala." = United States District Court for the Middle District of Alabama
- "Ct. Cl." = United States Court of Claims
- The abbreviation of a state's name alone indicates the highest appellate court in that state's judiciary at the time.
  - e.g.,"Pa." = Supreme Court of Pennsylvania
  - e.g.,"Me." = Supreme Judicial Court of Maine

== List of cases in volume 137 U.S. ==
Case Name	Page & year	Opinion of the Court	Concurring opinion(s)	Dissenting opinion(s)	Lower Court	Disposition
The Max Morris	1 (1890)	Blatchford	none	none	C.C.S.D.N.Y.	affirmed
York v. Texas	15 (1890)	Brewer	none	none	Tex.	affirmed
Butler v. Steckel	21 (1890)	Blatchford	none	none	C.C.N.D. Ill.	affirmed
Hostetter v. Park	30 (1890)	Blatchford	none	none	C.C.W.D. Pa.	affirmed
Dable G.S. Co. v. Flint	41 (1890)	Gray	none	none	C.C.N.D. Ill.	affirmed
Harding v. Woodcock	43 (1890)	Field	none	none	C.C.M.D. Tenn.	affirmed
Texas et al. Ry. Co. v. Southern P. Co.	48 (1890)	Fuller	none	none	La.	affirmed
Shenfield v. Nashawannuck Mfg. Co.	56 (1890)	Fuller	none	none	C.C.S.D.N.Y.	affirmed
Fishburn v. Chicago et al. Ry. Co.	60 (1890)	Fuller	none	none	C.C.W.D. Wis.	affirmed
La Confiance Compagnie v. Hall	61 (1890)	Fuller	none	none	C.C.E.D. Mo.	reversed
Washington M. Co. v. District of Columbia	62 (1890)	per curiam	none	none	Sup. Ct. D.C.	dismissed
In re Huntington	63 (1890)	per curiam	none	none	C.C.D. Colo.	habeas corpus denied
Florsheim v. Schilling	64 (1890)	Lamar	none	none	C.C.N.D. Ill.	affirmed
Hennessy v. Bacon	78 (1890)	Harlan	none	none	C.C.D. Minn.	affirmed
Crowley v. Christensen	86 (1890)	Field	none	none	C.C.N.D. Cal.	reversed
Seeberger v. Cahn	95 (1890)	Gray	none	none	C.C.N.D. Ill.	affirmed
Fitzgerald & M.C. Co. v. Fitzgerald	98 (1890)	Fuller	none	none	C.C.D. Neb.	affirmed
Williams v. United States	113 (1890)	Blatchford	none	none	Ct. Cl.	affirmed
Lawrence v. Rector	139 (1890)	Brewer	none	none	C.C.E.D. Ark.	decree modified
Gurnee v. Patrick Cnty.	141 (1890)	Fuller	none	none	C.C.W.D. Va.	dismissed
The S.S. Haverton	145 (1890)	Fuller	none	none	C.C.E.D. La.	dismissed
United States v. Grimley	147 (1890)	Brewer	none	none	C.C.D. Mass.	reversed
In re Morrissey	157 (1890)	Brewer	none	none	C.C.E.D. Mo.	affirmed
United States v. Trinidad C. & C. Co.	160 (1890)	Harlan	none	none	C.C.D. Colo.	reversed
Morgan's et al. Co. v. Texas C. Ry. Co.	171 (1890)	Fuller	none	none	C.C.N.D. Tex.	affirmed
Jones v. United States	202 (1890)	Gray	none	none	C.C.D. Md.	affirmed
Falk v. Robertson	225 (1890)	Blatchford	none	none	C.C.S.D.N.Y.	affirmed
Fourth Nat'l Bank v. American M. Co.	234 (1890)	Blatchford	none	none	C.C.S.D.N.Y.	affirmed
French v. Carter	239 (1890)	Blatchford	none	none	C.C.S.D.N.Y.	affirmed
Wheeler v. Jackson	245 (1890)	Harlan	none	none	Sup Ct. N.Y.	affirmed
Dobson v. Lees	258 (1890)	Fuller	none	none	C.C.E.D. Pa.	affirmed
MacFarland v. Jackson	258 (1890)	Harlan	none	none	Sup Ct. N.Y.	affirmed
Broom v. Armstrong	266 (1890)	Lamar	none	none	Sup. Ct. Terr. Utah	affirmed
United States v. Lynch	280 (1890)	Fuller	none	none	Sup. Ct. D.C.	dismissed
Grover et al. Co. v. Radcliffe	287 (1890)	Fuller	none	none	Md.	affirmed
Johnson v. Risk	300 (1890)	Fuller	none	none	Tenn.	dismissed
C.A. Auffmordt & Co. v. Hedden	310 (1890)	Blatchford	none	none	C.C.S.D.N.Y.	affirmed
The Nacoochee	330 (1890)	Blatchford	none	none	C.C.S.D.N.Y.	reversed
Solomons v. United States	342 (1890)	Brewer	none	none	Ct. Cl.	affirmed
Montana Ry. Co. v. Warren	348 (1890)	Brewer	none	none	Sup. Ct. Terr. Mont.	affirmed
Central Nat'l Bank v. United States	355 (1890)	Harlan	none	none	C.C.S.D.N.Y.	affirmed
Handley v. Stutz	366 (1890)	Gray	none	none	C.C.M.D. Tenn.	dismissal denied
Hamilton v. Home Ins. Co.	370 (1890)	Gray	none	none	C.C.S.D. Ohio	reversed
The Propeller Burlington	386 (1890)	Fuller	none	none	C.C.E.D. Mich.	affirmed
In re Lancaster	393 (1890)	Fuller	none	none	C.C.S.D. Ga.	habeas corpus denied
Fond du Lac Cnty. v. May	395 (1890)	Blatchford	none	none	C.C.E.D. Wis.	reversed
May v. Juneau Cnty.	408 (1890)	Blatchford	none	none	C.C.W.D. Wis.	affirmed
Union et al. Bank v. Gillespie	411 (1890)	Brewer	none	none	C.C.N.D. Ill.	affirmed
Busell T. Co. v. Stevens	423 (1890)	Lamar	none	none	C.C.D. Mass.	affirmed
Robertson v. Oelschlaeger	436 (1890)	Bradley	none	none	C.C.S.D.N.Y.	affirmed
Texas et al. Co. v. Scott	436 (1890)	per curiam	none	none	C.C.W.D. Tex.	dismissed
New York et al. Co. v. New Jersey et al. Co.	445 (1890)	Bradley	none	none	C.C.S.D.N.Y.	reversed
In re Pennsylvania Co.	451 (1890)	Bradley	none	none	C.C.D. Conn.	mandamus denied
Ex parte Pennsylvania Co.	457 (1890)	Bradley	none	none	C.C.D. Conn.	mandamus denied
Bass v. Taft	458 (1890)	Blatchford	none	none	C.C.D. Ky.	reversed
Hoffman et al. Co. v. Overbey	465 (1890)	Harlan	none	none	C.C.W.D. Va.	affirmed
Bank of B.N.A. v. Cooper	473 (1890)	Brewer	none	none	C.C.S.D.N.Y.	affirmed
Ambler v. Eppinger	480 (1890)	Field	none	none	C.C.N.D. Fla.	affirmed
Holden v. Minnesota	483 (1890)	Harlan	none	none	C.C.D. Minn.	affirmed
Bassett v. United States	496 (1890)	Brewer	none	none	Sup. Ct. Terr. Utah	reversed
Chicago et al. Ry. Co. v. Artery	507 (1890)	Blatchford	none	none	C.C.N.D. Iowa	reversed
Wellford v. Snyder	521 (1890)	Gray	none	none	Sup. Ct. D.C.	affirmed
St. Paul et al. Ry. Co. v. Phelps	528 (1890)	Lamar	none	none	C.C.D. Minn.	reversed
Merritt v. Cameron & Co.	542 (1890)	Lamar	none	Brewer	C.C.S.D.N.Y.	reversed
Cadwalader v. Partridge	553 (1890)	Lamar	none	none	C.C.E.D. Pa.	reversed
Mackall v. Casilear	556 (1890)	Fuller	none	none	Sup. Ct. D.C.	affirmed
Baltimore & P.R.R. Co. v. Fifth B.C.	568 (1891)	Gray	none	none	Sup. Ct. D.C.	affirmed
Lloyd v. McWilliams	576 (1890)	Fuller	none	none	C.C.D.R.I.	affirmed
Smith v. Gale	577 (1891)	Fuller	none	none	Sup. Ct. Terr. Dakota	dismissal denied
Sire v. Ellithorpe A.B. Co.	579 (1891)	Blatchford	none	none	C.C.S.D.N.Y.	affirmed
Ayers v. Watson	584 (1891)	Bradley	none	none	C.C.N.D. Tex.	affirmed
Preston v. Prather	604 (1891)	Field	none	none	C.C.N.D. Ill.	affirmed
Green v. Elbert	615 (1891)	Fuller	none	none	C.C.D. Colo.	dismissed
In re Converse	624 (1891)	Fuller	none	none	C.C.E.D. Mich.	affirmed
Red River C. Co. v. Needham	632 (1891)	Fuller	none	none	C.C.N.D. Tex.	dismissed
United States ex rel. Redfield v. Windom	636 (1891)	Lamar	none	none	Sup. Ct. D.C.	affirmed
Duncan v. Navassa P. Co.	647 (1891)	Gray	none	none	C.C.D. Md.	affirmed
Egan v. Clasbey	654 (1891)	Lamar	none	none	Sup. Ct. Terr. Utah	affirmed
Packer v. Bird	661 (1891)	Field	none	none	Cal.	affirmed
United States v. Page	673 (1891)	Fuller	none	none	Ct. Cl.	reversed
Cope v. Cope	682 (1891)	Brown	none	none	Sup. Ct. Terr. Utah	reversed
Massachusetts B. Ass'n v. Miles	689 (1891)	Brown	none	none	C.C.E.D. Pa.	dismissal denied
Caldwell v. Texas	692 (1891)	Fuller	none	none	Tex. Civ. App.	dismissed
