= Cayos Miskitos–San Andrés and Providencia moist forests =

Cayos Miskitos-San Andrés & Providencia moist forests
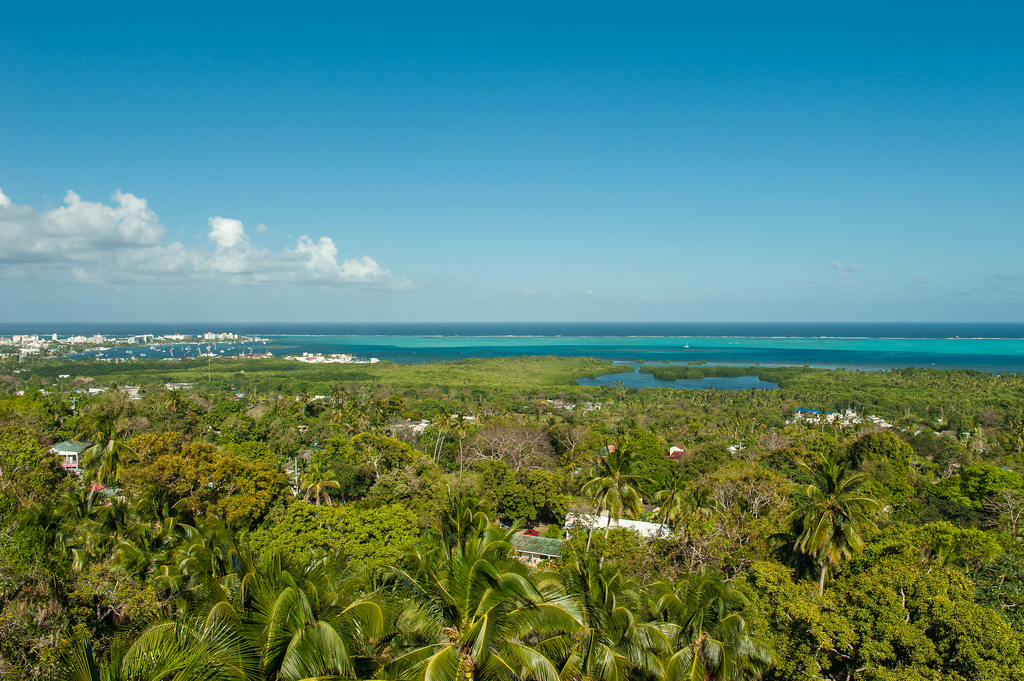
- San Andrés Island, Colombia

- Ecoregion territory (in blue dashed box, lower left)

Ecology
- Realm: Neotropic
- Biome: Tropical and subtropical moist broadleaf forests

Geography
- Area: 130 km^{2} (50 sq mi)
- Country: Nicaragua, Colombia
- Coordinates: 13.35°N 81.373°W

The Cayos Miskitos-San Andrés & Providencia moist forests ecoregion (WWF ID:NT0110) cover the forested areas of four islands in the western Caribbean Sea - Cayos Miskitos and the Corn Islands off the east coast of Nicaragua, and San Andrés and Providencia Islands farther east and belonging to the nation of Colombia. The forests on San Adres and Providencia have been heavily degraded by agriculture - coconuts on San Andres, oranges on Providencia. A significant feature of the ecoregion is the surrounding corals reefs, which are large and well preserved. While not technically a part of this terrestrial ecoregion, they are related to the islands.

== Location and description ==
There are four island groups in the ecoregion:

- Miskito Cays (Nicaragua), 40 km east of Awastara on the coast of Nicaragua, is an archipelago of 85 small, low-lying islands. The highest elevation is 10 meters. The island is the site of a RAMSAR wetland of international importance.
- San Andrés (island) (Colombia), is 200 km east of Bluefields, Nicaragua, but is politically part of the Colombia, in the department of Archipelago of San Andrés, Providencia and Santa Catalina. The highest elevation is 100 meters.
- Providencia Island, Colombia (Colombia), the main island in the archipelago of the Providencia and Santa Catalina Islands. The highest elevation is 300 meters.
- Corn Islands (Nicaragua), is 70 km east of Bluefields, Nicaragua.

== Climate ==
The climate of the ecoregion is Tropical monsoon climate (Köppen climate classification (Am)). This climate is characterized by relatively even temperatures throughout the year (all months being greater than 18 °C (64 °F) average temperature), and a pronounced dry season. This climate is mid-way between a tropical rainforest and a tropical savannah. Precipitation averages 1,900 mm/year at San Andreas, and 1,532 at Providencia. The average temperature is 27 °C (81 °F). The wet months are in June and later in September to November.

== Flora and fauna ==
While the original forests of San Andres featured mahogany, cedar, and other substantial tree species, these were logged and replaced with cotton and coconut cultivation. Today, the forest are mostly low thickets supporting genus Lantana, Croton, Randia, and Xylosma.

Four endemic species of conservation interest on San Andres are two birds - the San Andrés mockingbird (Mimus magnirostris), the Sam Andrés vireo (Vireo caribaeus) - a lizard (Anolis concolor) and a snake (Coniophanes andresensis).

== Protected areas ==
Over 54% of the territory of the islands are within an officially protected area, including:

- Cayos Miskitos y Franja Costera Inmediata, a RAMSAR wetland of international importance
- Old Providence McBean Lagoon National Natural Park, a national park of Colombia
- Seaflower Biosphere Reserve, which encompasses the marine areas around the islands of this ecoregion, hosts the third-longest barrier reef system on Earth.
