= Thomas O'Neill =

Thomas or Tom O'Neill may refer to:

- Thomas O'Neill (Wisconsin politician) (1821–?), member of the Wisconsin State Assembly from Milwaukee Co
- Thomas J. O'Neill (1849–1919), American merchant
- Thomas O'Neill (Canadian politician) (1882–1965), Canadian politician, member of parliament for Kamloops
- Thomas F. O'Neill (1890–1974), American art director
- Thomas O'Neill (journalist) (1904–1971), American writer for the Baltimore Sun
- Tip O'Neill (Thomas Phillip O'Neill Jr., 1912–1994), American politician
- Thomas P. O'Neill (historian) (1921–1996), Irish historian
- Tom O'Neill (ice hockey) (1923–1973), Canadian ice hockey player
- Thomas Newman O'Neill Jr. (1928–2018), United States federal judge
- Thomas P. O'Neill III (born 1945), American politician and leader of a public relations and government affairs firm
- Tommy O'Neill (born 1955), Scottish footballer

== See also ==
- Thomas O'Neil (disambiguation)
- Thomas O'Neal, football coach
- Tom O'Neill-Thorne (born 1997), Australian wheelchair basketballer
- Tomás O'Neill, 18th century Spanish colonial governor
- Thomas Neill (disambiguation)
