= Archipelago Movement for Ethnic Native Self-Determination =

Raizal organization

- President: Raymond Howard Britton
- Founded: 1999
- Headquarters: San Andres
- Ideology: Raizal self determination

Archipelago Movement for Ethnic Native Self-Determination (AMEN SD) is an umbrella organization that brings together various groups whose goal is the self-determination of the Raizal people of the Archipelago of San Andrés and Providencia, Colombia.

== History ==
The movement was created in March 1999 with the merger of San Andres Islands Solution (SAISOL), Barrack New Face, Sons of the Soil (SOS), Independent Farmers United National Association (INFAUNAS, The Ketleena National Association (KETNA), Just Cause Foundation, and Cove Alliance.

Its first appearance took place during the protests of July of that same year. They also participated in the protests of July 2001, after which they sent a statement to the World Conference against Racism in Durban, in which they condemned the excesses of Colombian colonialism.

In April 2002, they issued a new declaration calling for self-determination for the Raizal people and assuming their representation through the Raizal National Authority (Native National Authority).

Later, on June 1, 2007, as a group of protesters removed the Colombian flag from Morgan Canyon Plaza, the movement issued a declaration of independence calling on Colombian authorities to leave the territory.

Considering that we can no longer continue trying to survive under Colombia's destructive heel, we held a massive protest march on June 1, 2007, at 3:00 p.m., during which we lowered the Colombian flag, folded it respectfully, handed it over to a police officer, then raised our San Andres flag and proclaimed our Declaration of Independence from Colombia. This is one of our most serious actions, and we are moving forward.

— AMEN SD

In 2008, AMEN SD sent a letter to the International Court of Justice asking it to consider the position of the Raizal people within the border conflict between Colombia and Nicaragua over the San Andrés Sea.

Following the 2012 ruling that stripped the islands of part of their territorial waters, the movement protested before the Colombian Congress and proposed holding a self-determination referendum, taking as an example those carried out on the island of Puerto Rico.

== Ideology ==
For AMEN SD, the Colombian State has not only failed to comply with the commitments made to the Raizal people in 1822 (when the councils of San Andrés and Providencia freely adhered to the Constitution of Cúcuta), but has also initiated a process of ethnic extermination through the migration of continental settlers that has caused problems of overpopulation on the islands and displaced the original culture of the archipelago.

Therefore, considering that the Raizales are a nation with their own territory, language (San Andres Creole) and culture (Afro-Antillean), their inclusion in the list of territories pending decolonization of the United Nations is required.

Once this objective has been achieved, a self-determination referendum is proposed, which according to the 2015 proposal should be presented in the following terms:

First question: Do you agree with maintaining the current territorial political status of the Archipelago of San Andrés Providencia and Santa Catalina with respect to the Republic of Colombia (Department, according to Article 309 of the Political Constitution of Colombia of 1991)?

1. Yes.
2. No.

Second question: Depending on your answer to the first question, please indicate which of the following non-territorial options you prefer:

1. Sovereign Free Associated State of Colombia
2. Sovereign Free Associated State of another State
3. Insular Autonomous Region of Colombia
4. Independence
