= Anolis pinchoti =

Conservation status
- Least Concern (IUCN 3.1)

Scientific classification
- Kingdom: Animalia
- Phylum: Chordata
- Class: Reptilia
- Order: Squamata
- Suborder: Iguania
- Family: Dactyloidae
- Genus: Anolis
- Species: A. pinchoti

Binomial name
- Anolis pinchoti Cochran, 1931

Synonyms
- Norops pinchoti (Cochran, 1931)

Species of lizard

Anolis pinchoti, the Crab Cay anole, is a species of lizard belonging to the family Dactyloidae, the anoles. This species is endemic to the Archipelago of San Andrés, Providencia and Santa Catalina in the Caribbean Sea, these islands making up the Colombian department of San Andrés, Providencia and Santa Catalina.

== Taxonomy ==
Anolis pinchoti was first formally described in 1931 by the American herpetologist Doris Mable Cochran with its type locality given as Isla de Providencia. his species is a member of the Anolis auratus species complex of the anole family, the Dactyloidae.

== Etymology ==
Anolis pinchoti has the specific name, pinchoti, is in honor of American forester Gifford Pinchot.

== Description ==
Anolis pichoti was described from a holotype, a male, which had a snout-vent length of 44 mm (1.7 in). This specimen has drab-coloured sides and backs with reddish brown limbs, head and tail. There are a few ill-defined spots on the sides and some indistinct dark bands on the limbs and tail. There is a sepia blotch across the back of the head and the gular flap was tan coloured. A paratype was also discussed in Cochran's description, this was a female which had a dark stripe along the spine. The males are apparently slightly larger than the females.

== Geographic range ==
Anolis pinchoti is endemic to the Colombian Caribbean islands of Crab Cay, Providencia Island, and Santa Catalina Island in the Department of San Andrés, Providencia and Santa Catalina.

== Habitat ==
Anolis pinchoti is found in forest and shrubland, but it has also been found in banana plantations.

== Reproduction ==
Anolis pinchoti is oviparous.
