= San Andrés (island) =

Colombian island in the Caribbean

Native name: Islander Creole English: San Andres
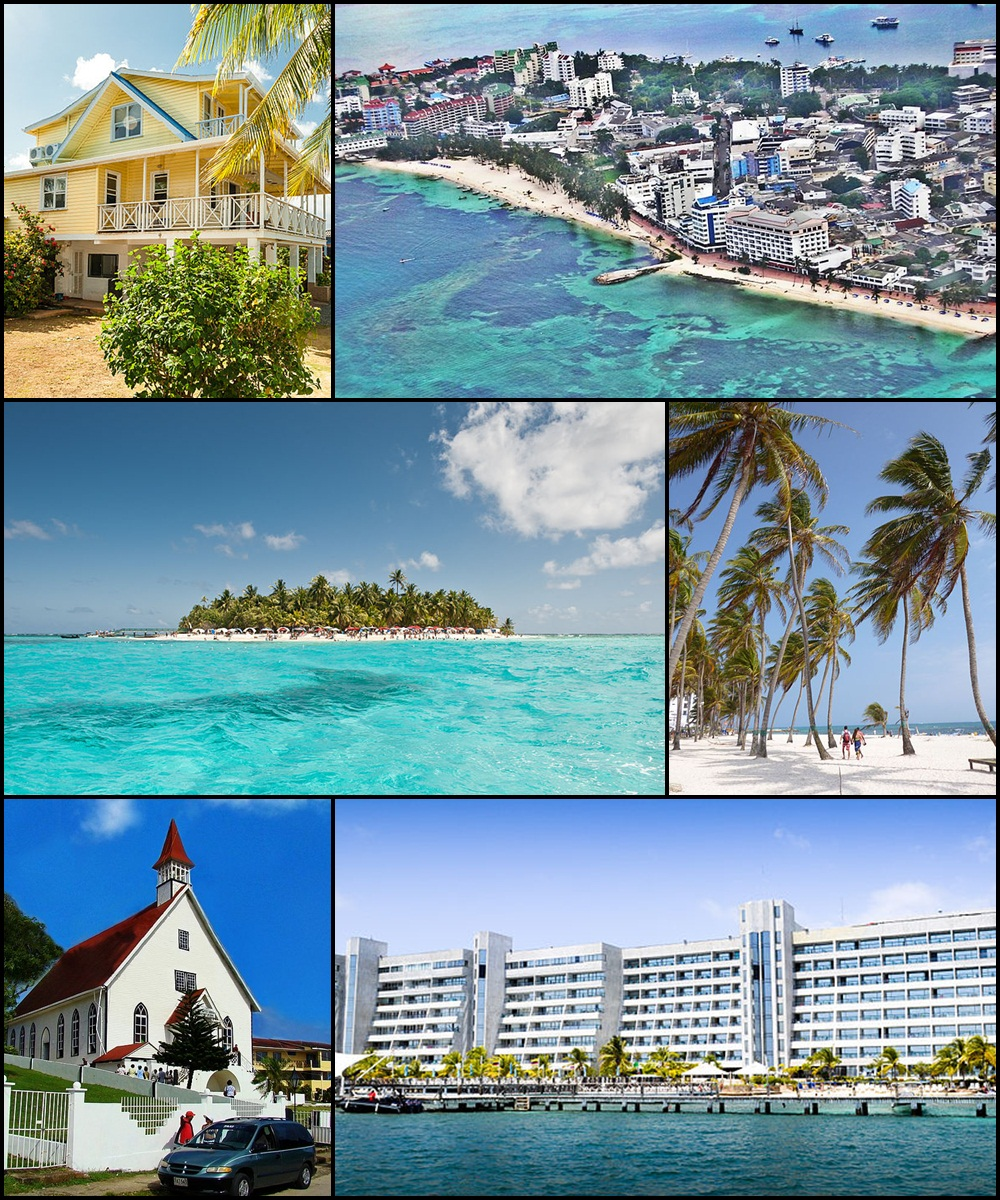
- Top to bottom, left to right: A typical San Andrés house, San Andrés Skyline, Johnny Cay, Spratt Bight Beach, First Baptist Church and the Sunrise Hotel

- Location within Colombia
- Interactive map of San Andrés

Geography
- Location: Caribbean Sea
- Coordinates: 12°32′52″N 81°43′08″W
- Major islands: San Andrés, Providence and Saint Catherine
- Area: 26 km^{2} (10 sq mi)
- Highest elevation: 84 m (276 ft)

Administration
- Colombia
- Department: San Andrés, Providencia and Santa Catalina

Demographics
- Population: 67,912 (2007 estimate)
- Languages: San Andrés Creole, English, Spanish
- Ethnic groups: Raizal

Additional information
- Official website: www.sanandres.gov.co

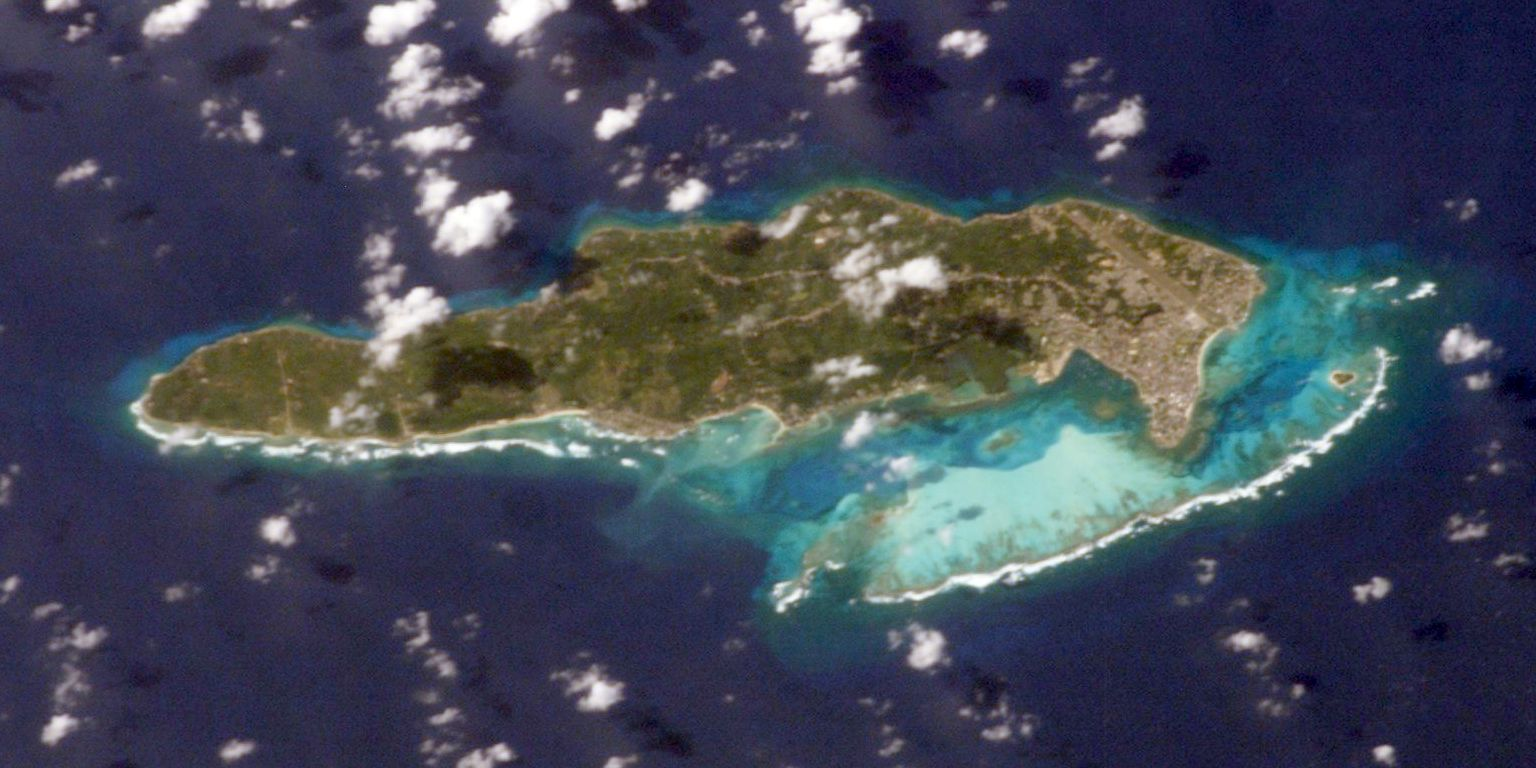
Satellite image of San Andrés Island

San Andrés (Islander Creole English: San Andres) is a coral island in the Caribbean Sea. Politically part of Colombia, and historically tied to the United Kingdom, San Andrés and the nearby islands of Providencia and Santa Catalina form part of the department of San Andrés, Providencia and Santa Catalina; or The Raizal Islands. San Andrés, in the southern group of islands, is the largest island of Colombia. The official languages of the department are Spanish, English, and San Andrés–Providencia Creole.

While San Andrés is located 50 km (31 mi) south of Providencia, the Colombian archipelago is approximately 750 km (470 mi) northwest of the Colombian mainland. This archipelago encompasses a total area of 57 km^{2} (22 sq mi), including the outer cays, reefs, atolls and sand banks, with the area of the islands being 45 km^{2} (17 sq mi). In 2000, it was declared a UNESCO Biosphere Reserve, named "Seaflower Biosphere Reserve", which not only includes the islands but also about 10% of the Caribbean Sea, amounting to a vast marine area of 300,000 km^{2} (120,000 sq mi). The purpose of this declaration is to ensure that the ecosystem, which is rich in biodiversity, is well preserved and conserved.

The department's capital is located on the northern end of the island. Named San Andrés but nicknamed El Centro, it is the department's main urban center. Along the 30 km (19 mi) road that circles the island there are many picturesque beaches, coral reefs, cays, blowholes, and coves. Also of note are La Loma, the town of San Andrés, the Baptist Church, Seaquarium, the large pond of La Laguna, and a freshwater lake amidst mangrove forest. There are coconut palm plantations, lush pastures, and tall native trees reaching 20 meters (66 ft). Surrounded by the warm Caribbean Sea, all of these features have made the island an "exotic holiday destination".

== History ==
=== Pre-Columbian times ===
In pre-Columbian times before 1492, the main island of the archipelago, San Andrés, and the smaller ones Providencia and Santa Catalina were already frequented by members of the Miskitu people during their traditional marine hunting activities. After these tasks, they would return to their homes along the present-day Honduran and Nicaraguan Caribbean coast. They referred to the main island as Abakoa.

=== 15th century ===
Documentation about the Island began in the 16th century with Spanish mapping of the Caribbean Sea, which included the Island of San Andres. Historical records state that Christopher Columbus came across these islands during his fourth voyage of exploration between 1492 and 1500.

=== 16th century ===
The history of both San Andrés and Providence includes stories of pirates, their invasions and occupation of the islands. The first appearance of San Andrés on Spanish maps was in 1527. The Dutch are reported to have come to these islands at the end of the 16th century and English settlers arrived there in 1628.

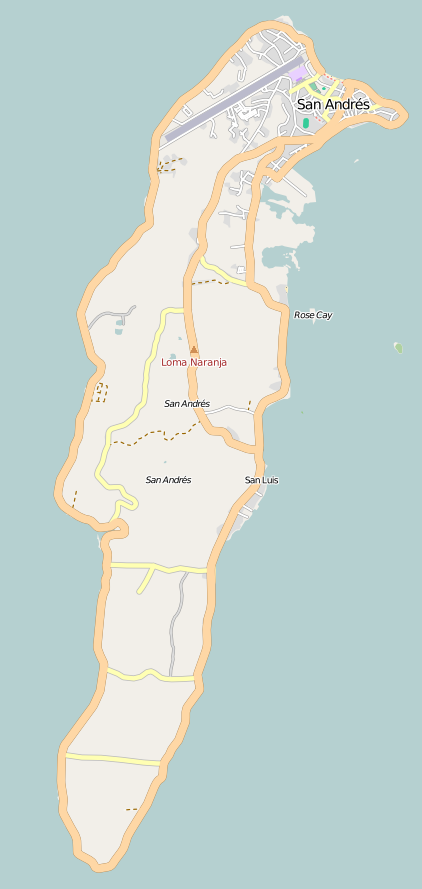
Map of the island

=== 17th century ===
The English Puritans arrived to the islands; they hailed from Barbados and also from England. Between 1627 and 1629, they came to settle in the salubrious climate and take advantage of the fertile land of the islands. The Puritans evicted the Dutch settlers in 1631. Some settlers also came from Wales. All colonists first came to San Andrés and later moved to the Providence Island colony on what is now Providencia Island as its mountain terrain provided fresh water resources and safety from invaders. Slaves were brought from 1633 onwards from Jamaica. They were initially brought to work in lumbering, as well as to grow cotton and tobacco.

In 1635, the Spaniards, realizing the economic importance of the island, attacked the archipelago. However, the Spaniards were driven out soon after they occupied the islands. Privateers also operated from the island, including Welsh privateer Henry Morgan, who used it in 1670 as one of the centers of his operations. The privateers attacked Spanish ships carrying gold and other precious material that sailed in the Caribbean waters, but the convoy system of the Spanish treasure fleet made it more difficult. They also attacked Panama and Santa Maria. The bounty looted by the privateers is still believed to be hidden in some underwater cave in the area.

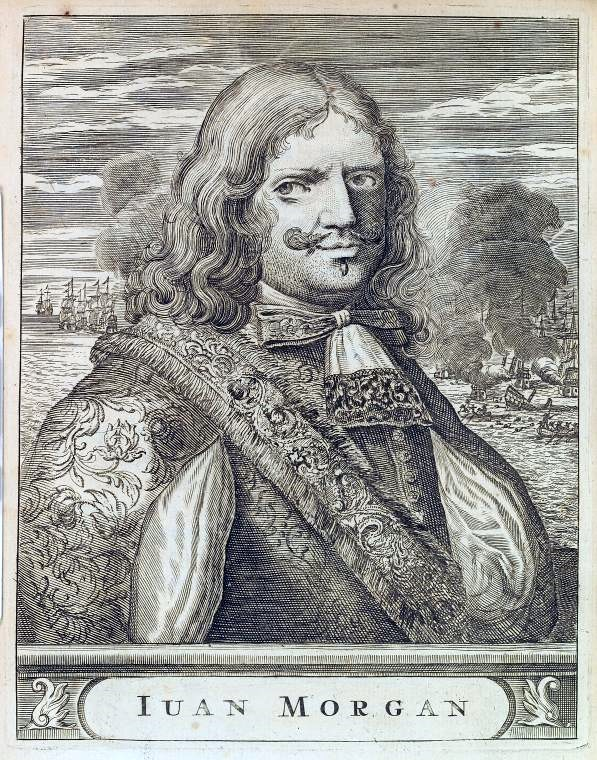
Pirate Henry Morgan

=== 18th century ===
After the failed Spanish invasion of the islands, they were controlled by England until 1787, when they agreed to return control of the island to Spain. In the year 1792, by royal warrant on 20 May, the Spanish informed the Captain General of Guatemala, Don Bernardo Troncoso, to recognize the archipelago as under Spanish control. The Catholic religion was spread on the island and a church was built and run by its own priest. San Andrés gave exemption from import and export taxes.

=== 19th century ===
On November 25, 1802, the inhabitants of the archipelago requested that they depend on the Viceroyalty of New Granada with the Mosquito Coast, and not on the Captaincy of Guatemala. The document was signed by Roberto Clark, procurator, Isaac Brooks, Solomon Taylor, Jorge Olis, and Juan Taylor. As early as 1803, reports suggest that it was for political and economic reasons that San Andrés became a dependent Viceroyalty of New Granada.

In 1810, factions in New Granada declared independence from Spain. Councils were established in San Andrés and Providence in this year. The government of Tomás O'Neill granted land titles to English and Spanish-speaking families of the two islands assuring people the ownership of the land. In July 1818, French privateer Luis Aury, and others of the independent forces of Simón Bolívar occupied the islands, and it became part of Gran Colombia on June 23, 1822.

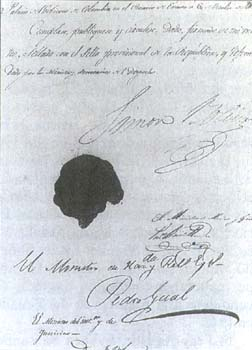
Constitution of Cúcuta

In 1821, the issuing of the Constitution of Cúcuta determined that every child born in Colombia, was born as a free citizen. This at a minimum meant the eventual abolition of slavery in San Andrés.

On March 5, 1825, a League and Confederation Treaty with the United Provinces of Central America was signed and on June 15, 1826, the Treaty of Union, League and Confederation, between the Republics of Colombia, Central America, Peru and Mexico was signed in Panama in that "Contracting Parties shall ensure the integrity of its territories, then, under special conventions and to hold each other, have been demarcated and set their respective limits, the protection will then be placed under the protection of the confederation."

After independence was recognized by the coastal territories of the Caribbean Sea, the British proclaimed an independent territory in disregard of treaties and agreements of the time but the island remained free from British autonomy. In 1848, Tomás Cipriano de Mosquera declared San Andrés as a Free port. In 1851, slavery was abolished by the constitution of Colombia, which led to a successful literacy movement led by pastor Philip Beekman Livingston.

=== 20th century ===
In September 1900, France issued a ruling in which it recognized all of the islands of the archipelago as belonging to Colombia. In 1902, two commissioners of U.S. President Theodore Roosevelt came to San Andrés by boat and requested that the islands become part of Panama, but American proposals were rejected outright as unpatriotic, proving local loyalty to the Republic of Colombia. In 1903, the Colombian Department of Panama became an independent nation. The islanders again refused to join the United States or Panama when they were visited by a U.S. warship in the same year. On 26 October 1912, the Municipality of San Andres and Providencia was established by Law 52, giving administrative independence. In August 1920, a boundary treaty was signed between Colombia and Panama in Bogotá. On 24 March 1928, the Esguerra-Bárcenas Treaty was signed, in which Nicaragua recognized Colombia's sovereignty over the Archipelago of San Andrés, Providence and Saint Catherine.

In November 1943, Colombia joined World War II, because a German submarine sank one of their boats that had to transport British troops to San Andrés. In 1953, at the request of several representatives of the island community, President Gustavo Rojas Pinilla reaffirmed the San Andrés Island and the free port. In 1972, the archipelago was declared as a Special Municipality. In the Colombian Constitution of 1991, the Department Archipelago of San Andrés, Providence and Saint Catherine was established as one of the Departments of Colombia. In 2000, the archipelago of San Andrés, Providence and Saint Catherine became a UNESCO World Biosphere Reserve as per of the five biosphere reserves listed with the UNESCO's Man and the Biosphere programme.

=== 21st century ===
In 2001, Nicaragua National Assembly declared the Bárcenas-Esguerra Treaty null because it claimed that it was signed under pressure of US army occupation (1928–1933). Nicaragua signed a boundary treaty with Colombia, in which it disputed the boundaries alleged by Colombia at 82 degrees longitude. In 2007, the International Court of Justice announced that the 1928 Bárcenas-Esguerra Treaty of 1928 wasn't a boundary treaty between Colombia and Nicaragua. Nicaragua filed a formal complaint to the International Court of Justice in The Hague, claiming territory east of longitude 82, as their continental marine platform included sovereignty over the archipelago of San Andrés. On 13 December 2007, the ICJ recognized the full sovereignty of Colombia over the islands of San Andrés, Providence and Saint Catherine, but left open the question about the demarcation of the maritime boundary and the sovereignty over the cays of Serranilla, Quitasueño, Serrana, Roncador and Bajo Nuevos with Nicaragua. The ICJ also ruled it "upheld preliminary objections of Colombia to its jurisdiction only insofar as they concerned sovereignty over the islands of San Andrés, Providence and Saint Catherine".

== Geography ==
Map

San Andrés is the largest of the island group in the Department of the Archipelago of San Andrés, Providence and Saint Catherine. San Andrés is located in the Caribbean Sea, about 750 km (470 mi) northwest of the coast of Colombia. The island is 13 km (8.1 mi) in length and 3 km (1.9 mi) in width. It has an area of 26 km^{2} (10 sq mi) within the total area of the group of islands of 45 square kilometres (17 sq mi) (27 km^{2} (10 sq mi) is also mentioned in this reference for San Andrés), making it the largest island in the archipelago. Providencia, the next largest in area, is located 80 km (50 mi) to the northeast. San Andrés has a fairly flat topography with the highest point in the island reported at an elevation of 55 m (180 ft) above sea level. San Andrés is crossed from south to north by a small mountain range whose highest peak is Cerro La Loma, also known as El Cliff. San Andrés' soils indicate that their formation is due to the eruption of a volcano which threw rocks older than the seafloor to the surface, creating the islands. Despite this, there is fertile soil and the soil is mostly red clay. It is easy to find small deposits of quartz on the island, especially in the neighborhood of La Loma Cove. Aside from the main settlements, the island is almost entirely covered in grass, trees and other vegetation, as well as sand along the coastline rather than rocks. The central area is marked by a chain of hills (Flowers, Orange, Shingle and Lion's Hill). The island has only small, ephemeral streams draining the land area, but no major rivers.

On the southwest coast of the island are some features, namely (from north to south) Bobby Rock, Boobie Rock, Fisher Rock and Tyler Rock. A feature named Rock Point is located on the southeastern coast. Suky Bay lies in the central western part of the island near Cove Sea Side. The northern part of the island has a beach, while the western part of the island has no beaches.

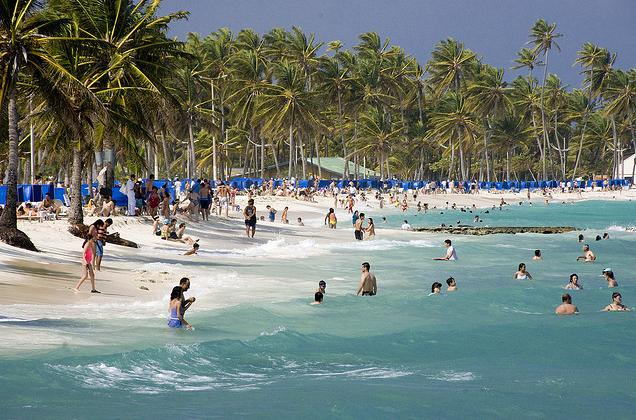
Beach in San Andrés

The island is surrounded on its northeast side by a small coral reef (arrecifex) and several keys that are home to varied fauna and flora, and are visited by many tourists every year. The small cay in the San Andrés Bay is said to be the most visited place in the archipelago. Johnny Cay is a small coral islet that is located 1.5 km (0.93 mi) to the north of San Andrés Town. It is a scenic place with white-sand beaches surrounded by coconut plantations. The sea here is not suitable for swimming as the current of flow could be risky. A natural park was also created here in 2001. Haynes Cay is the place where cruise ships are docked. There are a number of large coral farms here with variety of species. The place is also popular for water sports activities like snorkeling and diving. Diving here with a mask and sandals (protection against sea urchins) colourful fish species can be seen. El Acuario (The Aquarium) Cay is off to the east coast of San Andrés, adjoins the Haynes Cay. It is a popular center for snorkeling since the sea here has shallow and calm waters.

== Climate ==
The island experiences a tropical monsoon climate that borders on a tropical wet and dry climate. Average temperatures range from 24 °C (75 °F) to 30 °C (86 °F) in two periods dominated by dry and rainy spells. The rainy season is from May to January, when humidity is also high here. The trade winds from the north begin to blow in late October and during November and December until mid-January, the wind usually blows from the east, when there are storms in the northeastern Caribbean.

Climate data for San Andrés (Gustavo Rojas Pinilla International Airport), elevation 1 m (3.3 ft), (1971–2000)
Month	Jan	Feb	Mar	Apr	May	Jun	Jul	Aug	Sep	Oct	Nov	Dec	Year
Record high °C (°F)	31.5 (88.7)	31.4 (88.5)	32.5 (90.5)	32.4 (90.3)	33.3 (91.9)	33.2 (91.8)	34.4 (93.9)	32.9 (91.2)	32.9 (91.2)	33.7 (92.7)	32.4 (90.3)	32.1 (89.8)	34.4 (93.9)
Mean daily maximum °C (°F)	28.6 (83.5)	28.7 (83.7)	29.2 (84.6)	29.7 (85.5)	30.1 (86.2)	30.0 (86.0)	29.8 (85.6)	30.1 (86.2)	30.3 (86.5)	30.1 (86.2)	29.6 (85.3)	29 (84)	29.6 (85.3)
Daily mean °C (°F)	26.7 (80.1)	26.6 (79.9)	26.9 (80.4)	27.4 (81.3)	27.9 (82.2)	28.0 (82.4)	27.9 (82.2)	27.9 (82.2)	27.8 (82.0)	27.6 (81.7)	27.4 (81.3)	27.1 (80.8)	27.4 (81.3)
Mean daily minimum °C (°F)	25.0 (77.0)	24.8 (76.6)	25.0 (77.0)	25.6 (78.1)	26.1 (79.0)	26.1 (79.0)	26.0 (78.8)	26.1 (79.0)	26.0 (78.8)	25.5 (77.9)	25.6 (78.1)	25.2 (77.4)	25.6 (78.1)
Record low °C (°F)	18.2 (64.8)	19.0 (66.2)	19.6 (67.3)	18.3 (64.9)	20.8 (69.4)	21.0 (69.8)	20.0 (68.0)	20.3 (68.5)	21.2 (70.2)	20.3 (68.5)	21.4 (70.5)	20.0 (68.0)	18.2 (64.8)
Average precipitation mm (inches)	77.0 (3.03)	37.8 (1.49)	23.6 (0.93)	33.2 (1.31)	131.3 (5.17)	205.5 (8.09)	199.0 (7.83)	201.2 (7.92)	238.4 (9.39)	323.8 (12.75)	269.6 (10.61)	140.9 (5.55)	1,881.2 (74.06)
Average precipitation days	19	13	8	9	14	20	24	22	22	23	22	22	218
Average relative humidity (%)	80	79	78	79	82	84	83	83	83	83	83	81	82
Mean monthly sunshine hours	254.2	231.8	282.1	276.0	241.8	183.0	192.2	217.0	192.0	189.1	189.0	213.9	2,662.1
Mean daily sunshine hours	8.2	8.2	9.1	9.2	7.8	6.1	6.2	7.0	6.4	6.1	6.3	6.9	7.3
Source: Instituto de Hidrologia Meteorologia y Estudios Ambientales

== Demographics ==
The island's last reported population is 75,000; it was 72,912 in 2007, 55,000 in 1993, and 20,000 in 1973. The continuous growth and influx of people from the mainland of Colombia means that they now form about two thirds of the island's population. The native islanders are the descendants of the African and European settlers that first inhabited the islands.

== Economy ==
The economy of the island, which was largely dependent on fishery resources and meager agricultural production, underwent a change with the opening of air services from Colombia, followed by a 1954 declaration of the island as a duty-free zone (tax-free zone). This brought about a large influx of tourists to the island apart from immigrants from the mainland. The majority of foreigners to immigrate to the island were Lebanese and who continue to dominate the local economy till today. This also resulted in the local government imposing restrictions in the 1990s to control the influx of people from the mainland, with the intent to preserve local culture. However, there are no industries on the island.

== Tourism ==
The three years from 2003 to 2006 saw a greater than 10 percent increase in the number of tourists to San Andrés. Tourists increased from 341,293 in 2003 to 377,619 in 2006, of whom 292,741 were foreign nationals and 84,878 were from elsewhere in Colombia.

In July 2011, the archipelago received 23,000 tourists more than the previous year, in the same period. Furthermore, it has invested in hotel infrastructure 27,000 million.

=== Tourist attractions ===
Among the tourist attractions of the island are:

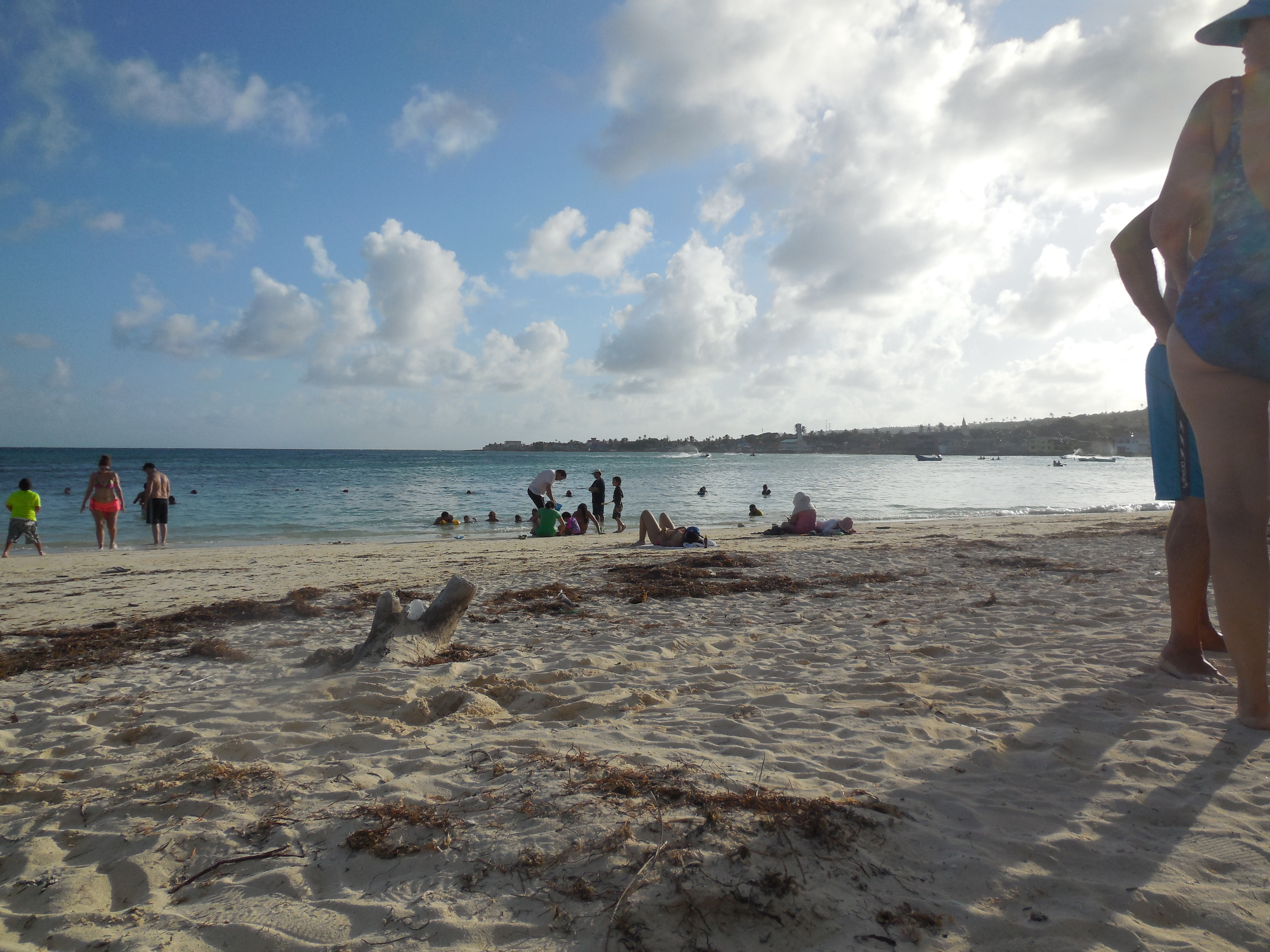
Rocky Cay Beach

- North End, is known locally as the center of San Andrés, which concentrates the hotel zone, commercial, banking and government.
- Islander House Museum (Casa Museo isleña), which was created by the natives in order to acquaint visitors with the culture and customs of the inhabitants.
- La Loma, a town inhabited almost entirely by natives of the island and one of the best places to appreciate the traditional island architecture.
- The Cayo Santander (or Coton Cay), which is located opposite the pier and close to the coast of the Bay of San Andrés, its name comes from the English settlers there deposited cotton crops and coconut.
- The Cliff or Peñon, limestone formation surrounding the airport, which is a rocky cliff about 30 meters high above the airport.
- Cocoplumbay, a beach located in the town of Saint Louis, right in front of Cayo Rocoso, because of its shallow depth, with its white sand and blue green sea, is a favorite spot for tourists.
- La Piscinita, natural formation that built the sea in the coral rock that surrounds the island.
- Rocky Cay Beach, on the north side of the Island.

== Flora and fauna ==
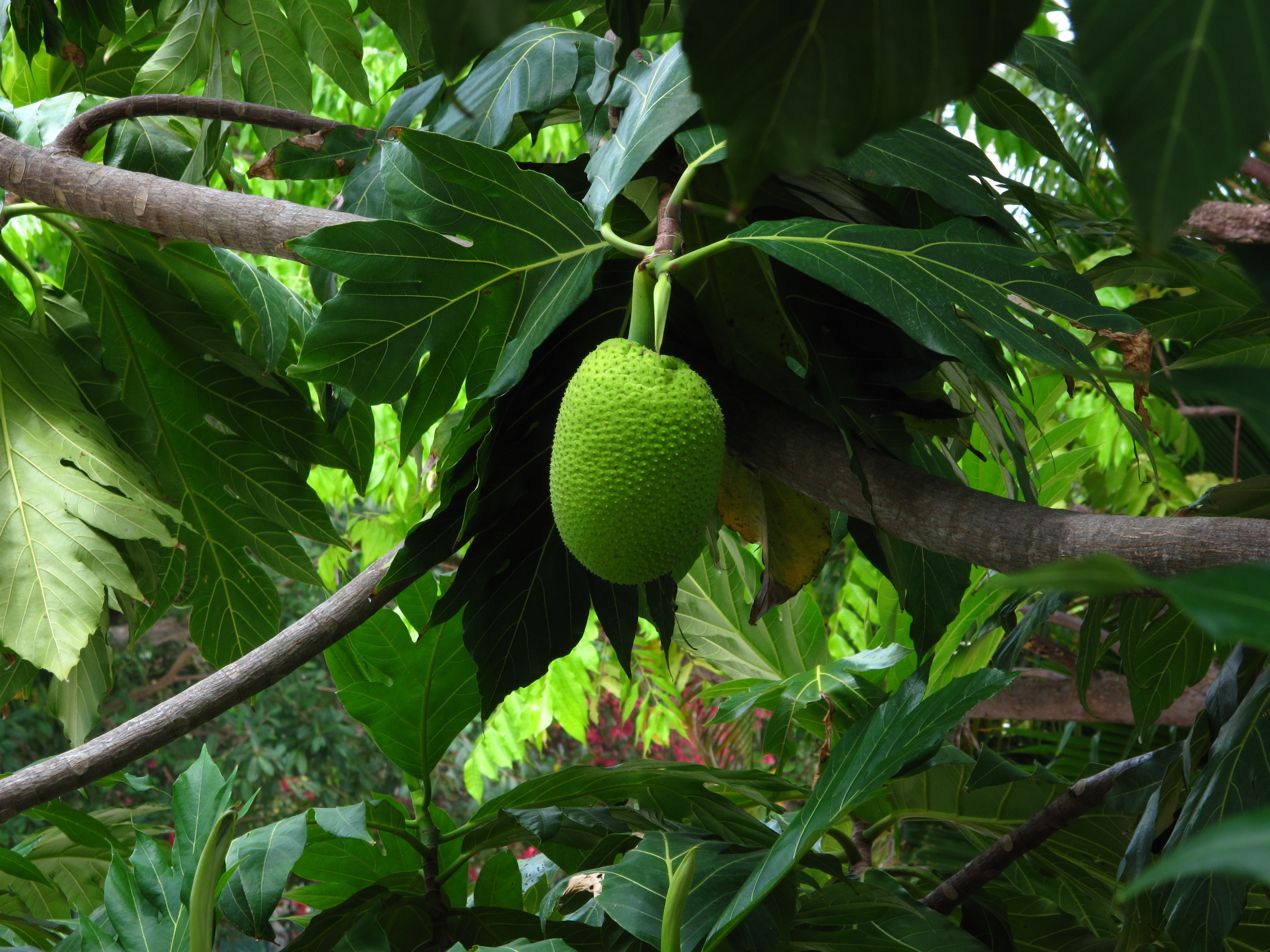
Breadfruit tree

The island has rich floral diversity in its vast mangrove swamps, the largest mangrove forest on the island being the Old Mangrove Point Regional Park. There are 12 mangrove forests in red, black and white colors, rich with many species of flora and fauna revitalizing the ecosystem. There are also coconut palm trees, breadfruit trees, tall growth of local trees, green and lush pastoral lands and farm lands.

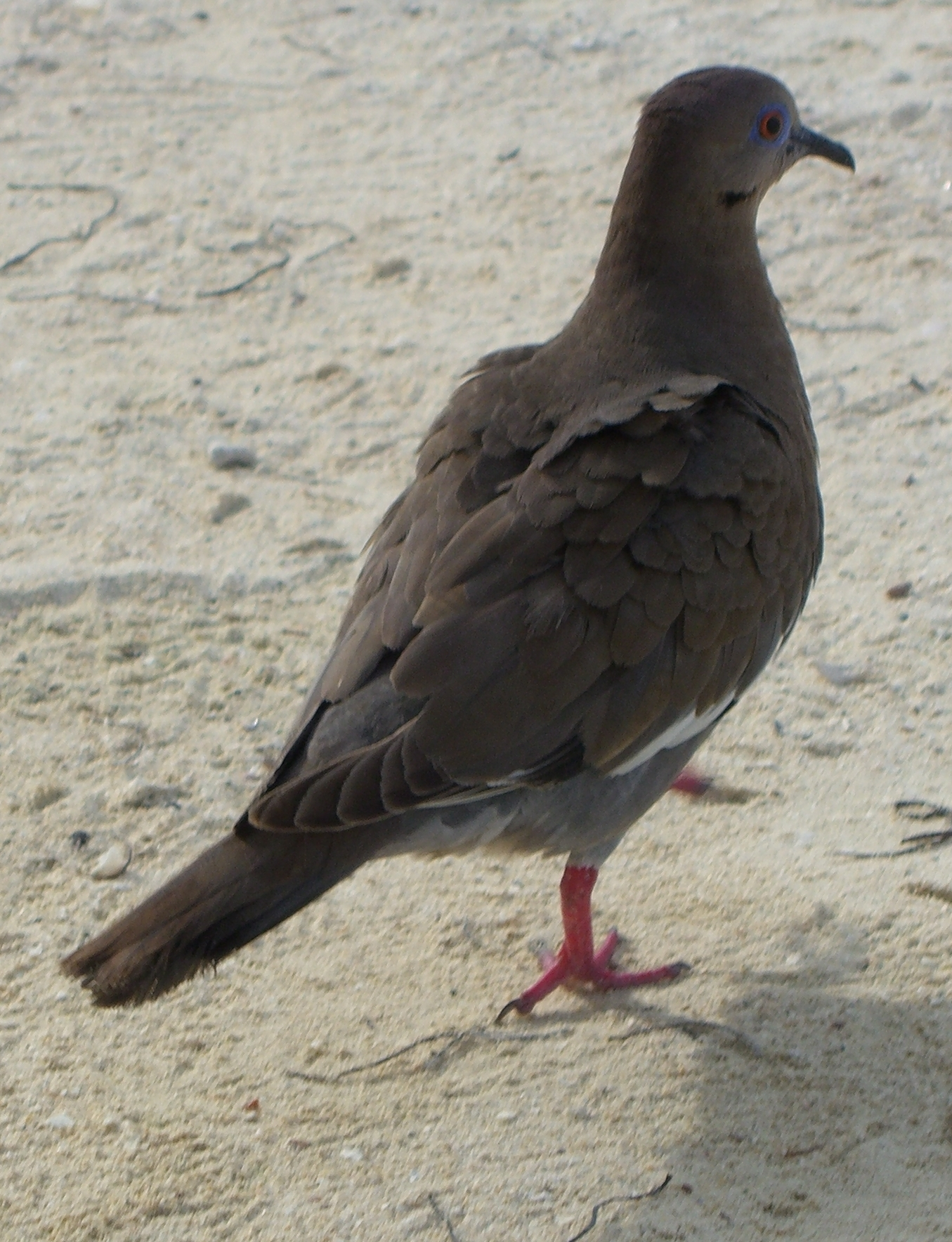
White-winged dove (Zenaida asiatica) on San Andrés.

The bird species named San Andres vireo (Vireo caribaeus), which can also be found at Providence and St. Catherine Islands, favors mangrove and scrub bush habitat. It is a small, innocuous, but delicate bird, green in color, in the family Vireonidae of order Passeriformes. It is about 5 inches (130 mm) in length, weighs about 16–20 g, found in clutch size of 2, and feeds on insects and fruits. IUCN has listed this bird species under the critically endangered list. Its habitat has been threatened due to large-scale expansion of the island lands for development of the capital city in the last few decades. It is reported that habitat of these birds is now confined to about 18 km^{2} (6.9 sq mi) area in the southern part of the island. Its distinguishing noise feature (song feature) is a single note repeated 2–20 times. In order to protect this local species, it has been suggested that the mangrove swamps of the island be declared as a protected area. Another bird found in abundance on the island is the white-winged dove (Zenaida asiatica).

A number of subspecies of birds are endemic to the island. These include

- Green-breasted mango Anthracothorax prevostii hendersoni
- Black-whiskered vireo Vireo altiloquus canescens
- Tropical mockingbird Mimus gilvus magnirostris
- Yellow warbler (Golden) Setophaga petechia flavida
- Bananaquit Coereba flaveola oblita
- Black-faced grassquit Tiaris bicolor grandior

The aqua faunal species found here are oysters and crabs. The coral species found in the island's shores are: staghorn coral (Acropora cervicornis), Elkhorn coral (Acropora palmata), pillar coral, brain coral, Erythropodium caribaeorum, star coral (Astreopora), soft corals (Alcyonacea), finger coral (Porites porites) and sea pens.

The only wild mammal that has been recorded from San Andrés is the Jamaican fruit bat (Artibeus jamaicensis).

== Settlements ==
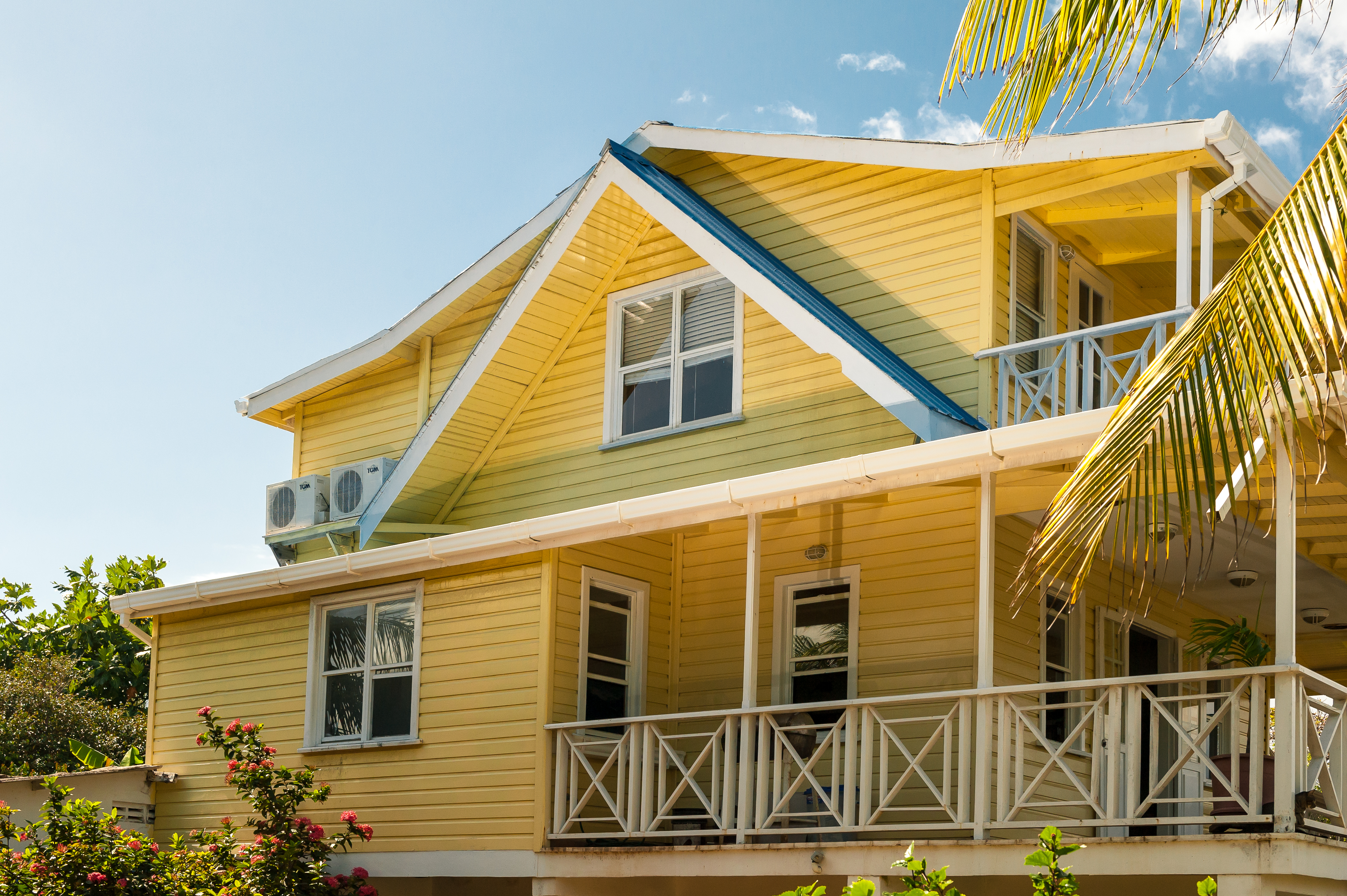
Typical house in San Andrés Island.

The population is grouped around a few residential areas. San Andrés, known locally as El Centro, is the largest town, as well as the most developed commercial and tourist hub of the island. It is located at the northern end and is the capital of the department. The departmental administration, commerce, banks, several hotels and the airport are located in this area.

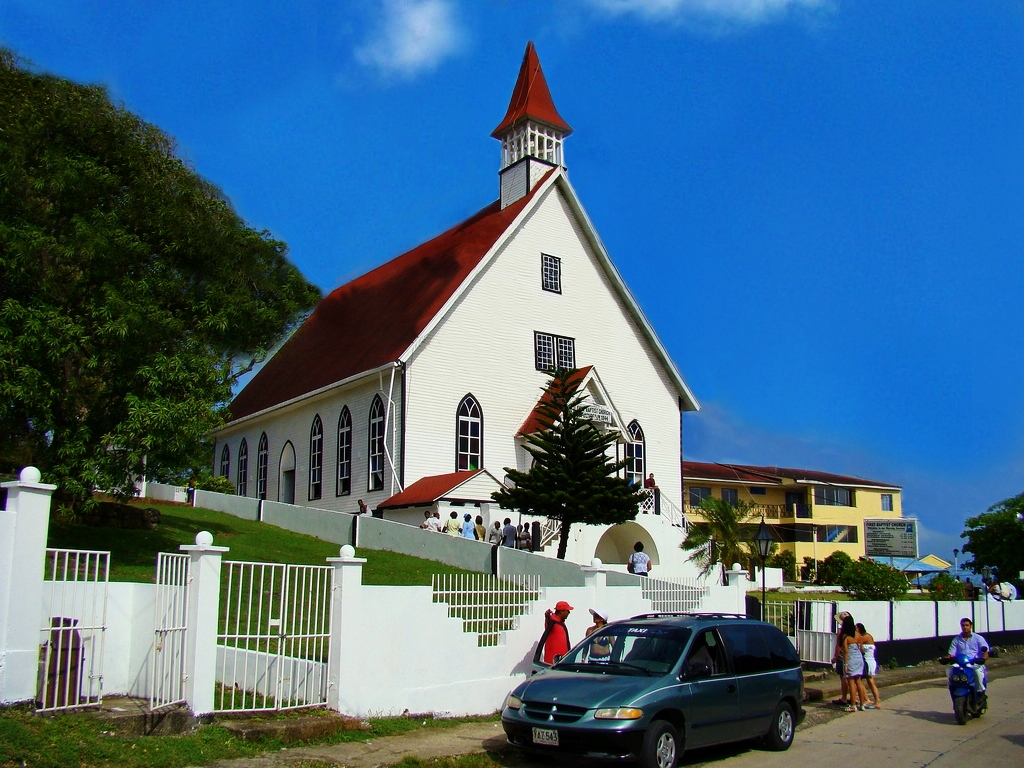
Iglesia Bautista Emmanuel, built in La Loma in 1847.

A smaller village, La Loma, is inhabited by the native islander population and is at the centre of the island. Its traditional fame is due to the Baptist Church that was established in 1847. This church was rebuilt with pine wood imported from Alabama. The Baptist church was built along the central road to La Loma, which functioned as a beacon for shipping. Located at the top of the hill, La Loma provides lovely views of the "seven coloured sea" (Caribbean Sea).

On the eastern coast of the island is Saint Louis, which is a small tourist town. It is notable both as a tourist establishment and for its impressive stretch of white-sand beach. Traditional wooden houses are also located on the shores of the beach, spread over a 3 km (1.9 mi) stretch. Here also, in view of generally calm sea water (only occasionally rough), snorkeling is a popular sporting activity. It used to be port for export of coconuts.

== Culture ==
Spanish is the main language. However, until the 1970s, the English language, architecture and religion were very much part of the island's culture with the Creole-speaking locals. This culture was called the Raizal culture of the Afro-Caribbean ethnic group. It is now more a blend of Latin American and English-Caribbean culture that is witnessed in the island. Other minority groups living in the island are the Chinese and the Middle Eastern people.

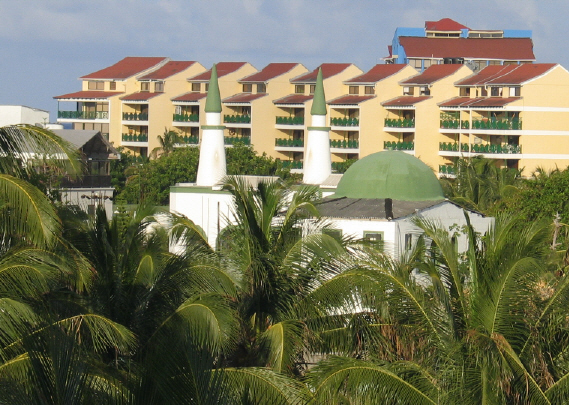
Mosque.

San Andrés is also famous for its local version of music that includes calypso, soca, reggae and church music. Concerts are held yearly in May at the Old Coliseum during the "Green Festival". Other celebrations and events held in the island are the independence day celebrations on 20 July and the "Coconut Reign" (Reinado del Coco) festival held in November.

=== Religion ===
The islanders are majority Protestant, with Baptists being the most common. Other religious groups, including Seventh-day Adventists, Catholics, Muslims, and Jews are also present on the island.

=== Attractions ===
The San Andrés Island, which attracts a large number of visitors, has many places of interest. Some of the important ones are: La Loma with its Baptist Church, a small blowhole at Hoyo Soplador, the snorkeling site at La Piscinita, white beaches of Saint Louis, the coral islet of Johnny Cay, the Pond, Haynes Cay, Morgan's Cave, West View and Acuario of the coast known for its diving center. The small cay in the San Andrés Bay is said to be the most visited place in the Archipelago. El Cove ("the cove") provides the deepest anchorage facilities on the island. Diving is a popular water sport in the island. The depth of water which varies in the range 3–30 meters (9.8–98.4 ft) has a visibility of 10–30 meters (33–98 ft) are favorable conditions for diving. The underwater formations seen during the diving are of three types namely, walls of seaweed and minor coral reefs, large groups of different types of coral, and underwater plateaus with much marine life. Diving lessons are provided by several sports agencies.

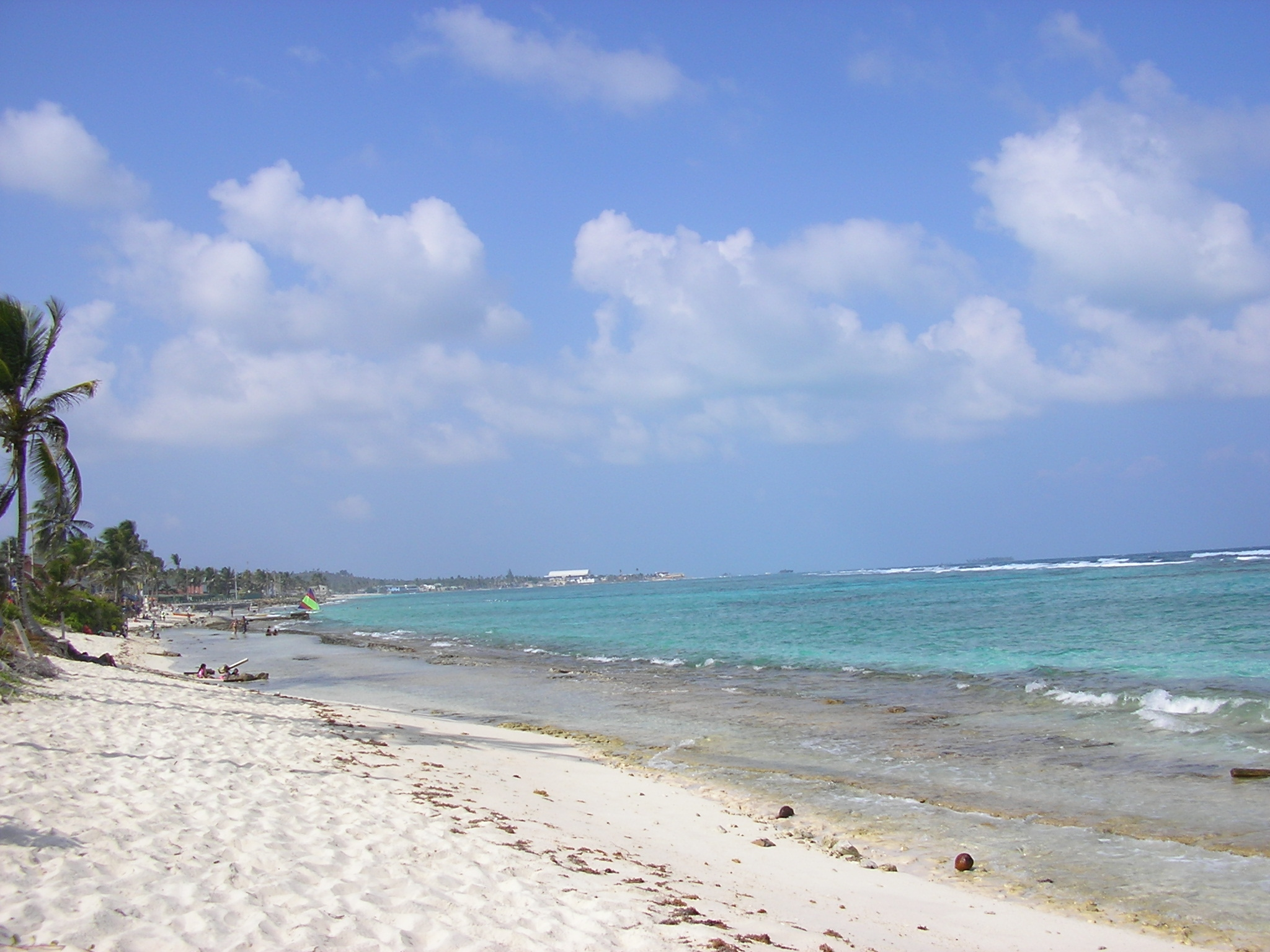
San Andrés beach.

La Piscinita, located in the western part of the island has a calm sea which permits snorkeling activity. The site has abundant fish resources. Hoyo Soplador is situated at the southern end of the island. A geyser emerging from the sea shoots up to a height of 20 meters (66 ft), emerging from a hole in the coral rock. This phenomenon is noticed only at certain times of the year when tide and wind direction favor such an action. It is also the center of an International Surf Competition held once a year. The Pond, also called La Laguna ("Big Pond"), situated on top of the hill, is 400 meters (1,300 ft) long and 250 meters (820 ft) wide. Its fresh water source is from rainfall and the lake is 30 meters (98 ft) deep. It has rich biodiversity of white heron, pigeon, palm trees and fruit trees. Brown caimans can also be observed here. Morgan's Cave, named after the Welsh privateer Henry Morgan, was the location where he allegedly hid his treasures. The cave is approached through an underwater passage. There is also a museum here. A seawater aquarium here has good display of Caribbean marine life. West View, as the name suggests, has 3–10 meters (9.8–32.8 ft) depth of water and is a favorite place for snorkeling, swimming and diving.

=== Sporting ===
Held on Saturdays, horse racing is a weekly event, even if only two horses race. Cockfighting, more popular on the island than football is in England, is considered to be a traditional sporting event rather than animal cruelty. Also, there are three small capacity stadiums in the town centre, each one for a different sport: softball, football and baseball. These sports are also practiced widely by the islanders in many areas of the island, especially in the southern part. Football teams participate in the Copa Claro.

== Transportation ==
With the construction of an airport in the northern part of the island, transport services from the mainland of Colombia brought economic development in the island, particularly in the San Andrés town. Gustavo Rojas Pinilla International Airport has flight services offered by American Airlines, Avianca, LATAM Colombia, Viva Air Colombia, Wingo, and SATENA to Barranquilla, Bogotá, Cartagena, Cali, Medellín, Miami, and Providencia. There are also charter flights offered by Air Transat from Montréal during winter months.

However, the sea route to visit the island is by cruise ships only (3–4 days journey). There are no passenger services to the island, though some cargo ships do carry a few passengers. The island also has a good network of paved lateral roads connecting the main circular road, which is of 30 kilometres (19 mi) length. A tourist train (improvised tractor with coaches) also operates within the island. Boat services are also available within the island to visit various small towns and other locations of tourist interest along the coast line.

== Bibliography ==
- Dydyńsk, Krzysztof (2003). Colombia. Lonely Planet. ISBN 0-86442-674-7.
- Woods, Sarah (2008). Colombia. Bradt Travel Guides. ISBN 978-1-84162-242-2.
- Las fronteras azules de Colombia (1985 - Villegas Editores) Complete online book by colombian photographer Hernán Díaz
