= Thomas O'Neil =

Thomas O'Neil may refer to:

- Thomas O'Neil (cricketer), New Zealand cricketer
- Thomas F. O'Neil, chairman of RKO General studios
- Thomas Michael O'Neil, American physicist
- Tommy O'Neil, English footballer

== See also ==
- Thomas O'Neill (disambiguation)
- Thomas Neill (disambiguation)
