= Providencia and Santa Catalina Islands =

Providencia and Santa Catalina Spanish: Providencia y Santa Catalina
- Municipality
- Providence and Saint Catherine Islands
- Flag Coat of arms

- Urban settlements in Providencia Island

- Location within Colombia
- Coordinates: 13°21′N 81°22′W
- Country: Colombia
- Department: San Andres and Providencia
- Region: Caribbean
- Established: 1853
- Capital: Saint Elizabeth (Providence)

Area
  - Total: 18 km^{2} (6.9 sq mi)
- Elevation: 2 m (6.6 ft)

Population (2015)
  - Total: 4,926
  - Density: 270/km^{2} (710/sq mi)
- Demonym: Providenciano (a)(s) (in Spanish)
- Time zone: UTC-5 (EST)
- Area code: 57 + 8
- Website: providencia-sanandres.gov.co (in Spanish)

Providencia and Santa Catalina Islands (Spanish: Providencia y Santa Catalina Islas) is a municipality within the Colombian department of San Andrés and Providencia, consisting of Providencia Island, Santa Catalina Island, and several uninhabited cayes to the North and East, with a population of 5,011 as of (2007). The islands are one of Colombia's top scuba diving destinations, with a 32 km long barrier reef protecting the eastern coast of Providencia Island.

== Geography ==
This is the main island of the Providencia group, and the second largest of the department. It is located at 13°21′N 81°22′W. Providencia Island and Santa Catalina Island (a small satellite island close off its northern end) extend 7.2 km in a north–south direction. The land area of Providencia Island measures 17 km^{2}. The mountainous center of Providencia Island rises to three peaks of about the same elevation: roughly 363 meters. The island consists of sedimentary rocks laid down on a former volcano. The chief settlement is Saint Elizabeth in the north, near Saint Catherine Island. Other villages are Lazy Hill on the west coast, and Bottom House in the southeast.

Low Cay, a very small islet, lies more than 10 km further north, at 13°32′N 81°21′W.

== History ==
The Miskito from the mainland first came into contact with the English when the Second Earl of Warwick established his colony on Providence Island in 1639. The Earl persuaded the Miskito leader to send his son to England as an emissary. This prince, known to his descendants as Oldman (or Oldham in old documents), was received in by King Charles I, who gave him noble title. He later returned to the Mosquito Coast to find that his father had died during his absence, and that he was now king. His son and successor, Jeremy, visited Jamaica in February 1688 and placed himself and his people under English protection as a result of Spanish aggression. Thereafter, all his successors were confirmed king by virtue of a certificate of recognition from the Governor of Jamaica.

In the years that followed, small numbers of English and American settlers, escaped convicts and slaves, settled in several centres along the coast, many of them intermarrying with the local tribes of Indians. They left offspring who took part in the military and administrative affairs of the Miskito kingdom. Relations between the Miskito and the Spanish had always been poor, and the increasing number of settlers increased tensions further. British commercial interest in hardwood logging in nearby Honduras also exacerbated Spanish antagonism and apprehensions. As a result, official British involvement in the region steadily increased. Miskito king Edward I and the British concluded a formal Treaty of Friendship and Alliance in 1740, followed by the appointment of a British Superintendent in 1749. His brief tenure included the establishment of a more formal protectorate over the Miskito nation, giving advice to the king, codifying the islands legal system, and formalising a system of land grants.

== Demographics ==
The local population consists of Raizals, a Protestant Afro-Caribbean ethnic group, speaking the San Andrés–Providencia Creole, an English Creole, although most speak Spanish as well. Spanish-speaking immigrants from Colombia have increased the use of Spanish, although they remain a minority, unlike the significantly more Spanish sister island, San Andrés.

A forum titled "San Andres & Providencia" Islands of Colombia reads “…This heritage goes back to pre-colonial times, to the days of the Dutch sea captains who inhabited San Andres and Old Providence, one of whom founded Bluefields, naming it after himself…”

== Transport ==
The local El Embrujo Airport is served by various daily flights from Gustavo Rojas Pinilla International Airport in San Andrés. Scheduled flights are operated by Satena, and charter flights by Decameron/Searca.

A 50-seat catamaran makes the two and a half hour return trip from San Andres to Providencia Island four times a week, leaving San Andres in the morning, and returning in the afternoon.

== Wildlife ==
Due to the insular and oceanic nature, terrestrial fauna is limited and presents a high degree of endemism. Only a single species of frog (Leptodactylus insularis) and a single species of terrestrial turtle (Geochelone carbonaria) have been found. Two species of snakes (Boa constrictor imperator and Leptotyphlops magnamaculata), 6 of saurians, 10 of birds, 4 of sea turtles and a few of mammals have also been reported.

== Climate ==
Climate data for Providencia Island
Month	Jan	Feb	Mar	Apr	May	Jun	Jul	Aug	Sep	Oct	Nov	Dec	Year
Record high °C (°F)	30.8 (87.4)	32.4 (90.3)	33.2 (91.8)	35.1 (95.2)	32.9 (91.2)	32.6 (90.7)	31.9 (89.4)	32.8 (91.0)	33.0 (91.4)	32.4 (90.3)	32.0 (89.6)	31.6 (88.9)	35.1 (95.2)
Mean daily maximum °C (°F)	29.6 (85.3)	30.0 (86.0)	30.7 (87.3)	31.3 (88.3)	31.7 (89.1)	31.6 (88.9)	31.2 (88.2)	31.6 (88.9)	31.9 (89.4)	31.4 (88.5)	31.0 (87.8)	30.3 (86.5)	31.0 (87.8)
Daily mean °C (°F)	26.6 (79.9)	26.5 (79.7)	26.8 (80.2)	27.4 (81.3)	28.0 (82.4)	28.1 (82.6)	28.1 (82.6)	28.1 (82.6)	27.9 (82.2)	27.5 (81.5)	27.4 (81.3)	26.9 (80.4)	27.4 (81.4)
Mean daily minimum °C (°F)	21.9 (71.4)	21.8 (71.2)	21.3 (70.3)	23.3 (73.9)	24.0 (75.2)	23.6 (74.5)	23.8 (74.8)	23.6 (74.5)	23.1 (73.6)	23.1 (73.6)	22.5 (72.5)	22.6 (72.7)	22.9 (73.2)
Record low °C (°F)	18.9 (66.0)	18.9 (66.0)	19.2 (66.6)	21.4 (70.5)	22.0 (71.6)	21.0 (69.8)	19.8 (67.6)	22.2 (72.0)	21.8 (71.2)	22.0 (71.6)	20.5 (68.9)	21.2 (70.2)	18.9 (66.0)
Average rainfall mm (inches)	74.4 (2.93)	45.8 (1.80)	23.8 (0.94)	35.0 (1.38)	116.1 (4.57)	173.4 (6.83)	143.9 (5.67)	154.0 (6.06)	182.2 (7.17)	301.9 (11.89)	256.9 (10.11)	130.1 (5.12)	1,637.5 (64.47)
Mean monthly sunshine hours	229.9	225.8	260.3	255.6	226.6	186.7	209.7	232.5	195.2	188.5	180.5	194.7	2,586
Source: Instituto de Hidrologia Meteorologia y Estudios Ambientales
