= The Unexpected Father =

1932 film

- Directed by: Thornton Freeland
- Written by: Robert Keith; Max Lief; Richard Schayer; Dale Van Every
- Produced by: Stanley Bergerman; Carl Laemmle Jr.
- Starring: Slim Summerville; Zasu Pitts; Cora Sue Collins
- Cinematography: Jerome Ash
- Edited by: Arthur Hilton
- Production company: Universal Pictures
- Distributed by: Universal Pictures
- Release date: January 3, 1932
- Running time: 72 minutes
- Country: United States
- Language: English

The Unexpected Father is a 1932 American comedy film directed by Thornton Freeland and starring Slim Summerville, Zasu Pitts, and Cora Sue Collins. It was produced and distributed by Universal Pictures. The film's sets were designed by the art director Thomas F. O'Neill.

== Synopsis ==
A wealthy bachelor hires an attractive nanny to look after his adopted daughter, leading to jealousy from his gold-digging fiancée who suspects a romance between the two.

== Cast ==
- Slim Summerville as Jasper Jones
- Zasu Pitts as Polly Perkins
- Cora Sue Collins as Pudge
- Alison Skipworth as Mrs. Hawkins
- Dorothy Christy as Evelyn Smythe
- Grayce Hampton as Mrs. Smythe
- Claud Allister as Claude
- Tyrell Davis as Reggie
- Tom O'Brien as Policeman
- Richard Cramer as Policeman

== Bibliography ==
- Stumpf, Charles. ZaSu Pitts: The Life and Career. McFarland, 2010.
