= Crab Cay =

Island in Colombia

Native name: Cayo Cangrejo
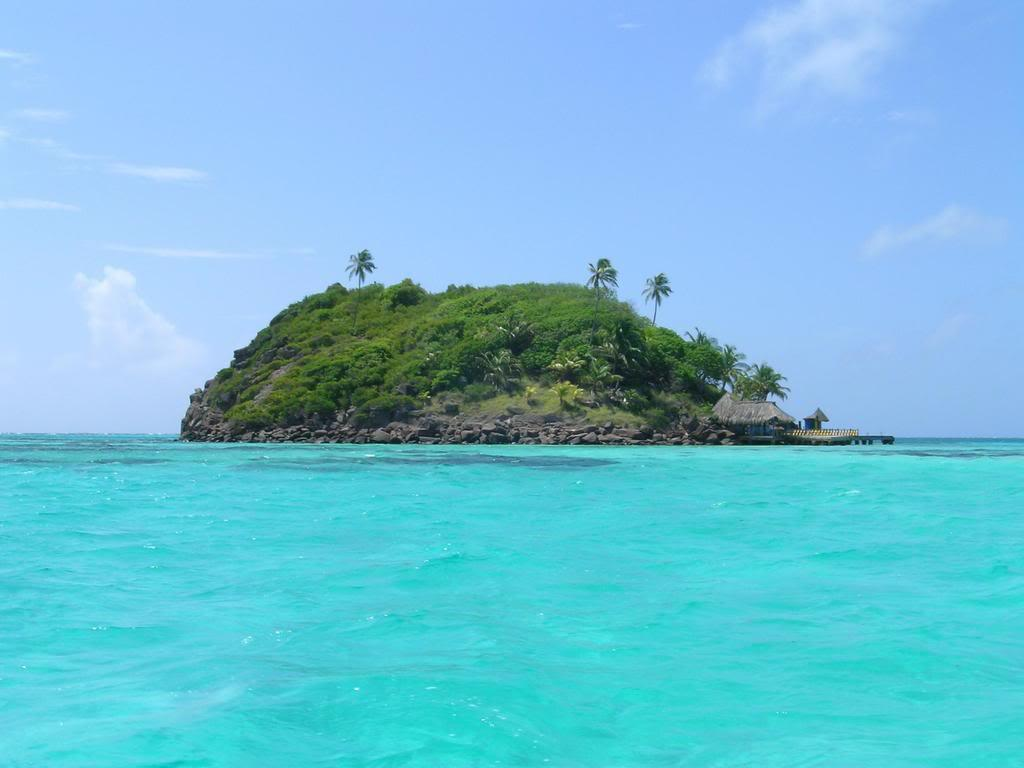
- Crab Cay
- Interactive map of Crab Cay

Geography
- Location: Caribbean Sea
- Area: 0.02 km^{2} (0.0077 sq mi)
- Highest point: 30m

Administration
- Colombia
- Department: Archipelago of San Andrés, Providencia and Santa Catalina

Demographics
- Population: 0 (2014)

Additional information
- Time zone: UTC−05:00

Crab Cay or Cayo Cangrejo is a small island in Old Providence McBean Lagoon National Natural Park within the municipality of Providencia and Santa Catalina Islands.

== See also ==
- Caribbean Region, Colombia
- Providencia and Santa Catalina Islands
