= Tomás O'Neill =

Spanish colonial governor (1764 – unknown)

Governor of San Andrés Archipelago

Personal details
- Born: Tomás Francisco Placido del Carmen O'Neill y Salmón; October 5th 1764 Puerto de la Cruz
- Spouse: María Manuela Alfaro de Monterroso
- Children: Ann Eliza
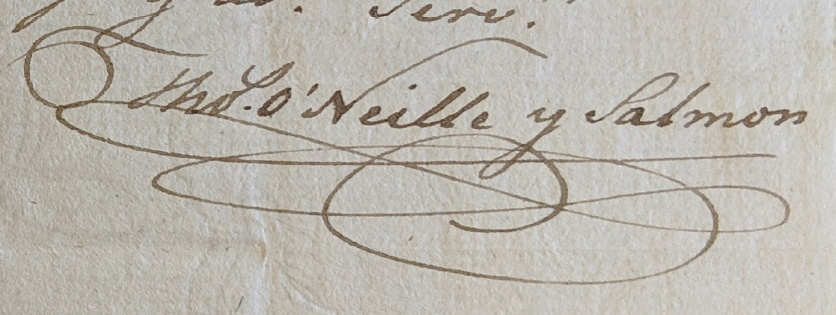
- Signature

Military service
- Allegiance: (Spanish Empire) Spain – until 1810
- Rank: Lieutenant
- Unit: Regimiento de Infanteria Fijo de Cartagena

Tomás O'Neill y Salmón (5 October 1764 – unknown) was a Spanish colonial governor of the western Caribbean archipelago of San Andrés, Providencia and Santa Catalina, today part of modern Colombia.

O'Neill was the son of an Irish father and Canarian mother, and bilingual in Spanish and English, which aided his later career. He became the interpreter on board the Spanish expedition sent to expel the English-speaking population of the archipelago in 1789, having arrived in the New World nine years earlier aged 16. Rather than expelling them as agreed to by the colonial powers under the Treaty of Versailles and the Convention of 1786, he was instrumental in not only helping secure the position of the English-speaking Protestant inhabitants, but becoming their governor, and having a significant impact on the islands at a pivotal time in their history.

== Early life and career ==
Tomás Francisco O'Neill y Salmón was born in Puerto de la Orotava (today Puerto de la Cruz) in the municipality of La Orotava in Tenerife, on October 5, 1764 to Patricio O'Neill (28 April 1740 – 18 April 1768) and Catalina Salmón. His father, Patricio or Patrick, was a native of Waterford, Ireland, and was a vice consul for the British. He had married Catalina in January 1764, three years after arriving in Tenerife. Patrick had close connections with the network of Irish merchants operating from Tenerife, including the wealthy Cologan family. His mother, Catalina, was born in Tenerife, though both her parents, Thomas Salmón and Catalina (Catherine) Comerford, might have been Irish. It is likely Tomás O'Neill was named after his maternal grandfather Thomas Salmón, who had also acted as an interpreter in Tenerife. Both of O'Neill´s parents died when he and his brother Enrique were young, and both were raised on Tenerife by their maternal aunt on his mother's side of the family, María Salmón.

Leaving his native Tenerife, he first tried his luck in the English-speaking new world, spending two and a half years in Charleston South Carolina, but later pursued his career in the Spanish-speaking New World.

Together with his brother Enrique, he served in the Spanish military in the last two decades of the 1700s and the early years of the 1800s. Tomás O'Neill served in the Regimiento de Infanteria Fijo de Cartagena in Cartagena de Indias, together with Enrique. In 1791 Tomás was a lieutenant in the sixth company of the first battalion.

== Arrival on San Andrés ==
In December 1789, O'Neill, at the age of 25, was part of a Spanish mission under captain Juan de Gastelú to the islands of San Andrés and Providence in the western Caribbean. He was a lieutenant and English-speaking interpreter. The aim of the mission was to enforce the terms of the Treaty of Versailles by evacuating all non-Spanish settlers from Spanish territories. This included the San Andrés Archipelago, Corn Islands and the Miskito Coast. O'Neill's bilingual skills were necessary as San Andrés at that time was populated by English-speaking landowners, their families, and slaves. Some, but not all, of the settlers left San Andrés before the Spanish mission's arrival. "On December 21, 1789, the mission arrived in San Andrés. At dawn, Gastelú summoned the inhabitants and ordered them to evacuate, giving them four months, until April 1790, to collect and transport their belongings". It seems that O'Neill did more than interpret and in fact assisted in the mediation process between the Spanish Crown forces and the Islanders. O'Neill assisted in formulating the petition to the Spanish authorities for the islanders to remain on the islands, with the promise that they would be loyal subjects. "Compunct the inhabitants sent to Cartagena as their representative, the Irishman Lorenzo Thine with their pleas to the Crown". This petition was transmitted through the viceroy, Antonio Caballero y Góngora.

== Governorship ==
In 1792 Madrid acquiesced to the islanders remaining, and in 1795 O'Neill was appointed governor of the islands and promoted to the rank of captain. The islands would fall under the jurisdiction of the Captain-General of Guatemala. This remained the situation until 1803, when per a request from O'Neill (with the support of the islanders), the islands (together with the Miskito Coast) were transferred to the Viceroyalty of Nueva Granada, and thus they came under the administration of Cartagena. This change was significant and is the essential reason they are today part of Colombia. The Miskito Coast was transferred back to Guatemala in 1806. American geographer James J. Parsons characterized O'Neill's rule as one of a "benevolent dictator", providing the islanders with O'Neill as a champion before the Spanish Court. His detractors have accused him of being an opportunist and of essentially being an eighteenth-century lobbyist, having a habit of writing letters requesting appointments for himself and promotion. O'Neill's connections with the Spanish Court were through his network in Cartagena and the Canaries. He followed a pragmatic policy regarding the hispanisation of the existing population and an even more lax attitude to trading restrictions imposed against trading with non-Spanish ports in the western Caribbean. The islands were supposed to only trade with Cartagena and Trujillo in Honduras.

He was not dogmatic in imposing Catholicism, taking a soft approach to the issue, preferring islanders as "buenos herejes no como malos católicos". However it does seem that he himself was a devout Catholic. In 1797 O'Neill, asked the Spanish Crown to send two Catholic priests for the attention of the faithful in San Andres. He justified his request by lamenting in a letter that even his own wife and nine others had died without Catholic sacraments. A Catholic priest was appointed and sent from the mainland in 1803 on a salary of 30 pesos a month, and a church was constructed with funds from the Royal Treasury and Royal Coffers in Cartagena.

His pragmatic approach also extended to economic activities. O'Neill may have not only overlooked smuggling, but taken part. especially in interactions with his business partner on the mainland, his father-in-law, Agustin de Alfaro in León de Nicaragua. It has been argued that O'Neill lobbied for the removal of the islands from the jurisdiction of Guatemala to that of Nueva Granada (Cartagena) in order to keep authorities above him at a distance. Regardless, he did provide a stable government on the islands and regularized land ownership on the islands, granting titles to land parcels to the islanders. The economy thrived and the population grew under his tenure. He appointed alcaldes (mayors) and brought to San Andrés its first school teacher. His jurisdiction was, of course, an archipelago yet O'Neill tended to focus his attention on the island of San Andrés and left the islands of Providencia and Santa Catalina in the hands of Francis Archbold, a settler of Scottish heritage who had come from Jamaica and had been instrumental in the resettlement of the two more northern islands.

Between 1798 and 1800, O'Neill was recalled to the continent, where he married in 1800, for reasons relating to the outbreak of new hostilities between Spain and Great Britain. The authorities believed the islands would be difficult to defend and O'Neill's abilities would be better utilized in Guatemala. During his absence in 1799, during which islander Torquiel Bowie stood in as his replacement, there was a slave uprising on San Andrés. He returned to San Andrés in 1801. He was welcomed back as he was viewed by the islanders as a "kind, enterprising and progressive man"; he however seemingly found the island in disarray. Overall his policy with the continent was one of engagement. He established good relations with the King of the Miskito Coast; one of his last acts as governor was to sign a treaty with the Coast and its king, Stephen (Regent, 1800–1816).

== British invasion ==
On 26 March 1806 Captain John Bligh arrived on H.M.S. Surreyance of the Royal Navy with 144 sailors and soldiers. With only around 30 soldiers in the island's garrison, O'Neill was persuaded to surrender, and Bligh took control of the islands. He transported O'Neill to the continent and dropped him, his brother Enrique, a priest, and his men on a beach near Cartagena. O'Neill was court-martialled by the authorities for surrendering, but was acquitted. He returned to the Islands on 17 October 1807. Bligh had left the islands poorly defended, so O'Neill and his military force were able to recapture the islands for Spain.

== Resignation ==
O'Neill resigned as governor in 1810, citing ill health. There are a number of theories on O'Neill's resignation. Some argue that having returned to Cartagena against his will O'Neill had become aware of the likelihood of revolution against Spanish rule. The invasion had damaged his administration's infrastructure, and there were limited financial resources to restore it. Despite promotion for himself and a government salary, funding of O'Neill's administration seemed to have been problematic as higher authorities had instituted special tax concessions and tax exemptions on commercial activities which adversely impacted the financing of his administration.

== Personal life and family ==
The O'Neill brothers were very much a product of the Irish diaspora on Tenerife. The witnesses at their parents wedding in January 1764 included Diego Furlong, Thomas Cologan and Bernardo Cologan. Patricio O'Neille, their father would have been heavily involved in facilitating trade as a Consul on the island.

The O'Neill brothers served the Spanish Crown in Cartagena de Indias and "became part of the elite of the city through two fortunate marriages". Unfortunately, Tomás's marriage ended when his wife died on San Andrés; he lamented in a letter in 1797 that there was no priest on the island to give her the last rites. He remarried in 1800, to María Manuela Alfaro de Monterroso, the daughter of Agustín de Alfaro his business agent in León (now Nicaragua). María was fourteen while Tomás was thirty five. They had daughter, Ann Eliza (1817–1862) who married Philip Beekman Jr, a man who also would have a significant impact on the history of the Archipelago.

Little is known about Enrique O'Neill (2 February 1766 – unknown). He came to the Americas under Tomas's patronage and acted as captain of the guard (this was made up of around 30 soldiers) in San Andrés. It is highly likely he was named after his paternal grandfather, a Henry O'Neill (10 September 1721 – unknown) back in Waterford. Enrique it seems made a good marriage in Cartagena, to María Melchora de la Torre y Baloco in 1803. The O'Neill brothers had a sister, Juana María, born on 15 April 1767; however, other than a baptismal record, no other records of her have come to light.

Little is also known regarding Tomás O'Neill's activities after he stood down as governor. He had a daughter, born in 1817, seven years after he stood down. We also know that in 1822 Tomás O'Neill was on the island council, and that one of the signatures of a document proclaiming the archipelago's loyalty to Colombia that year was his.
