= San Andrés, San Andrés y Providencia =

San Andrés
- City and Capital department
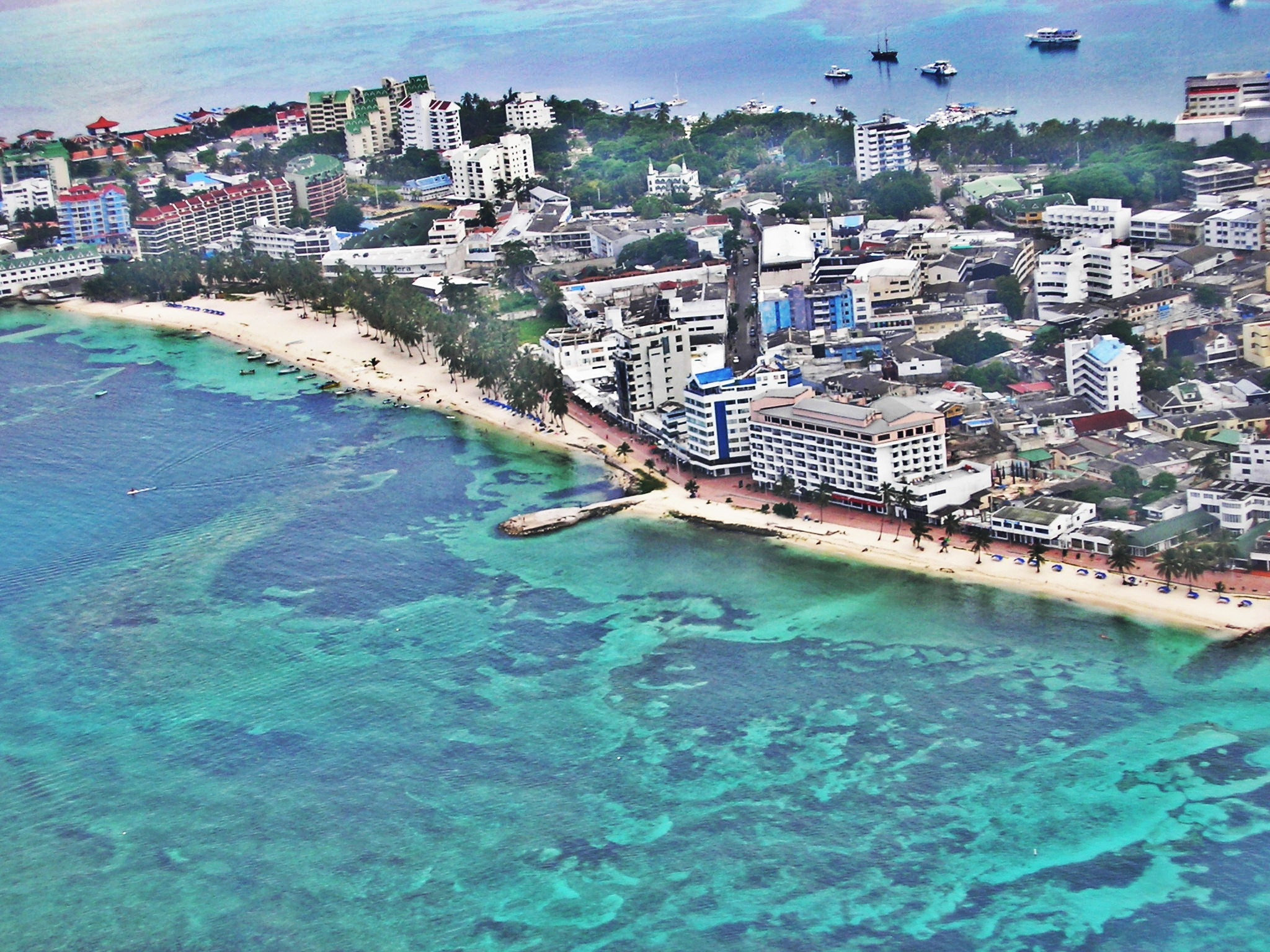
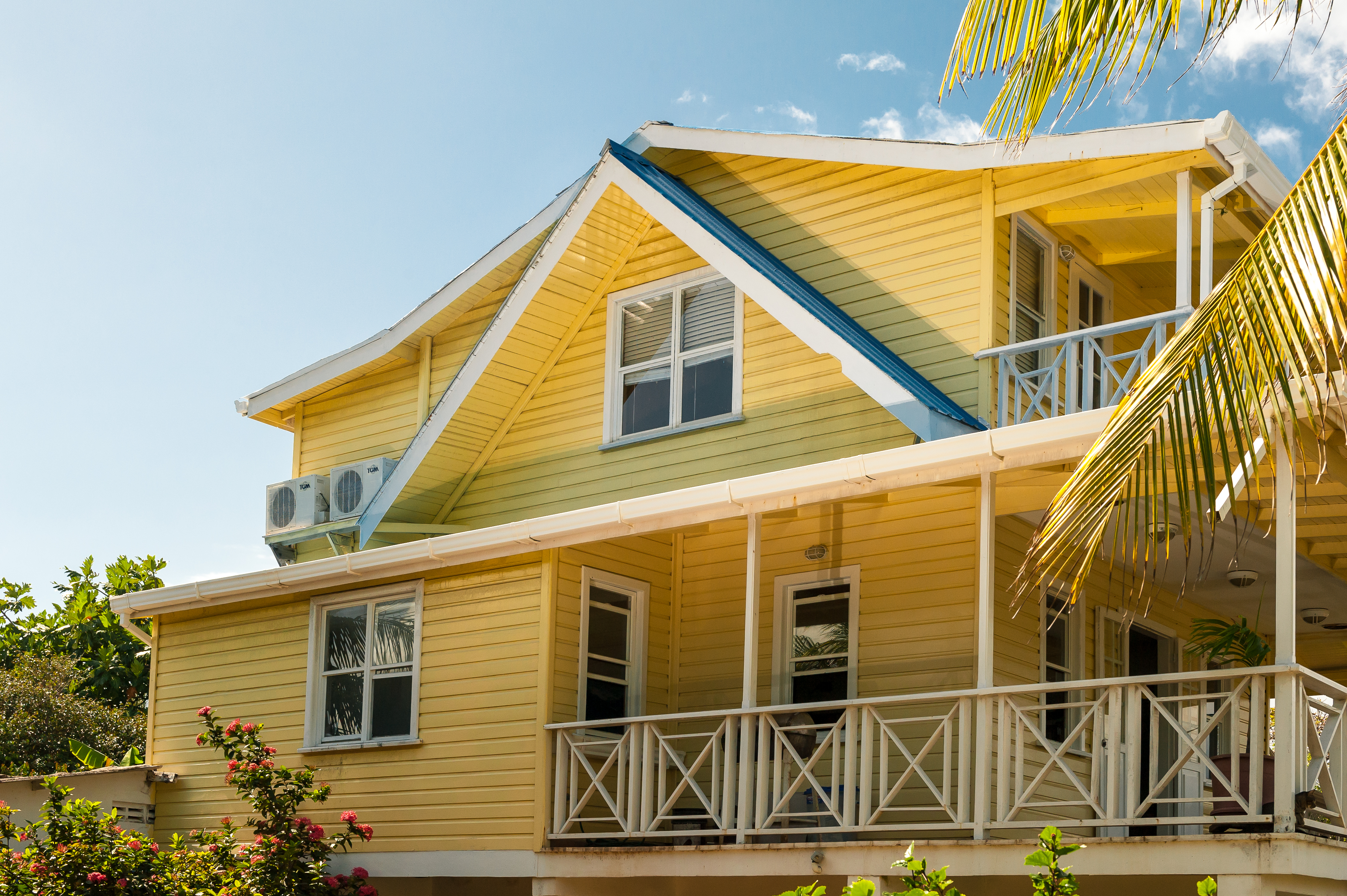
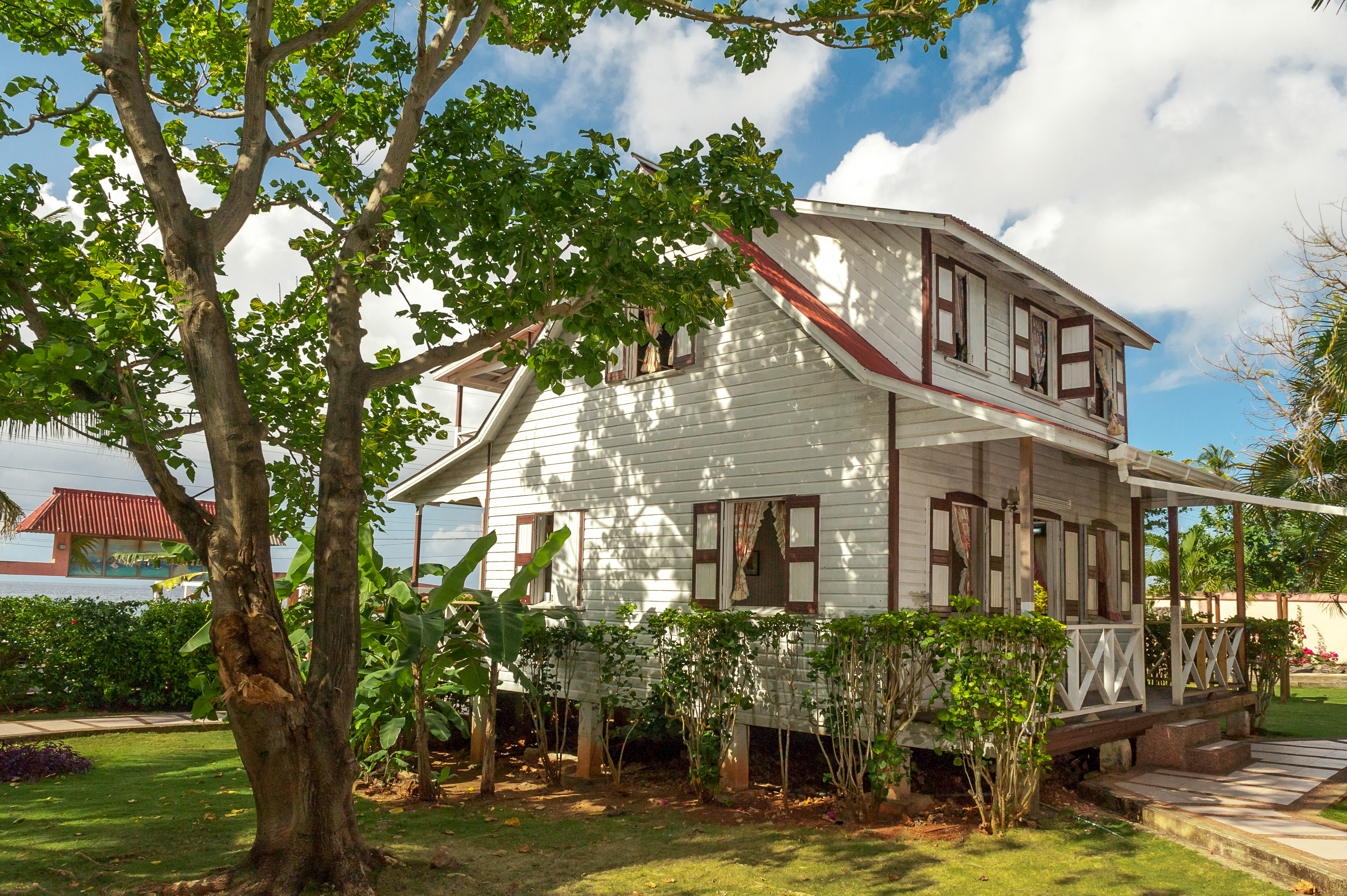
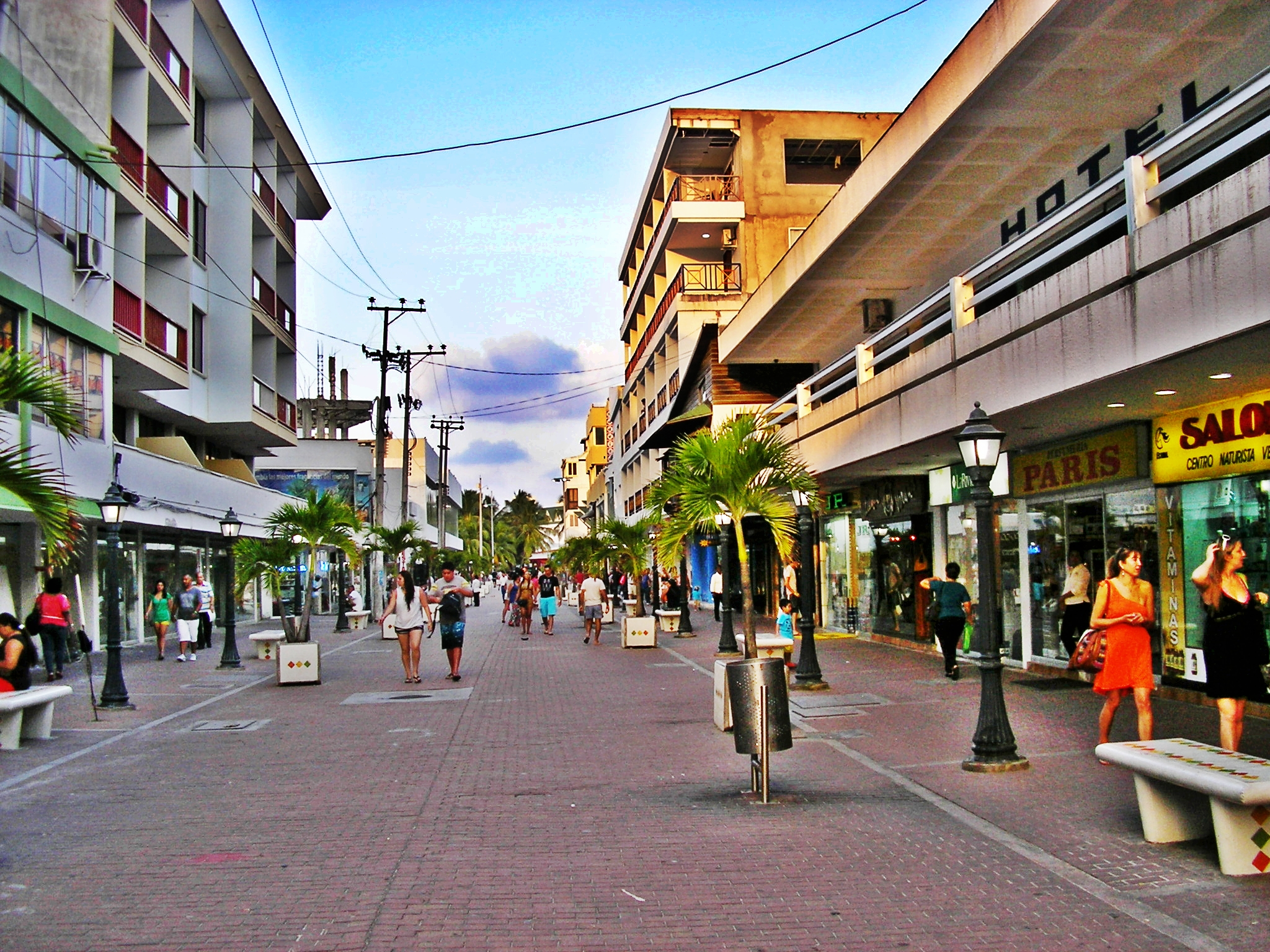
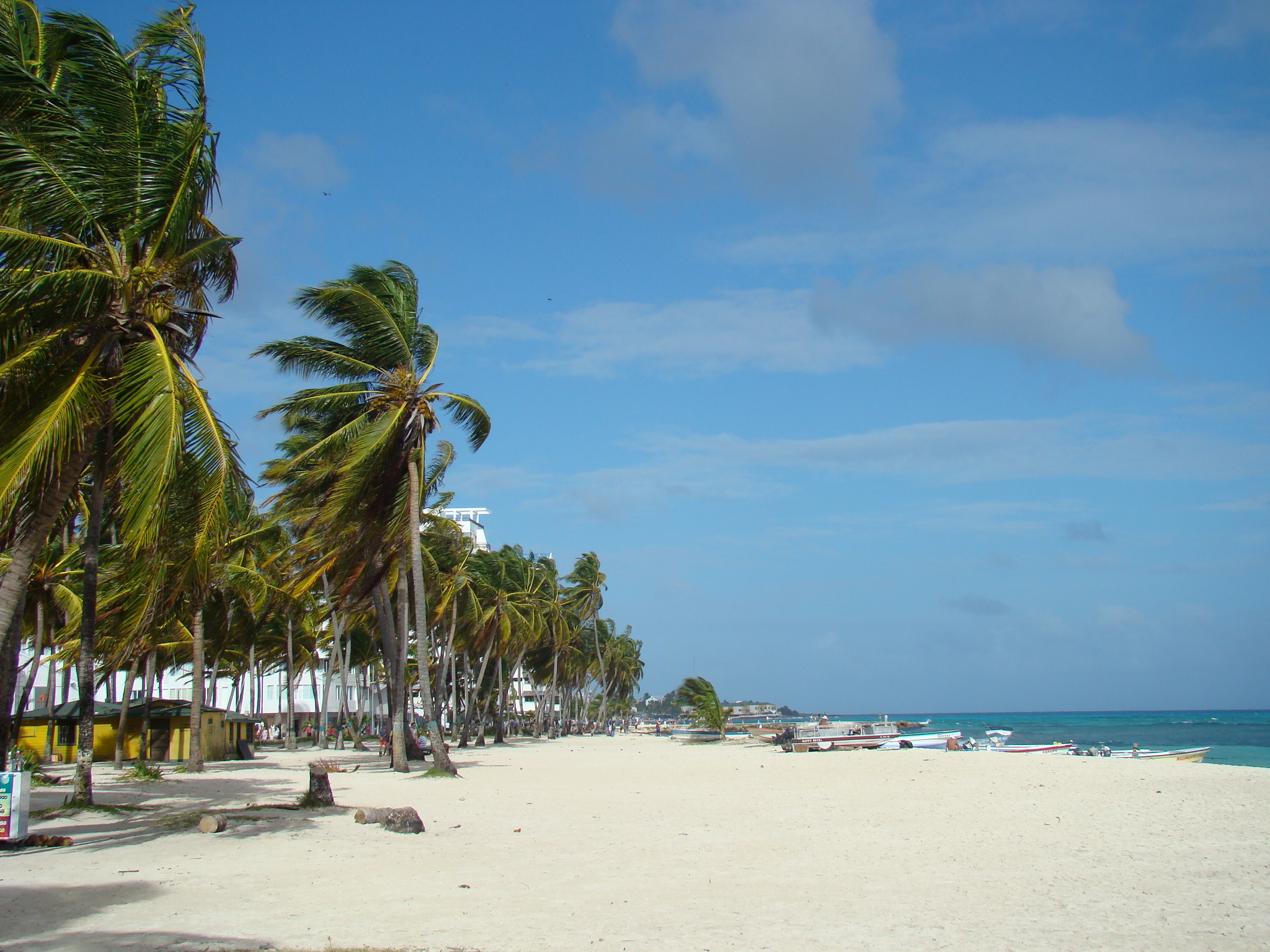
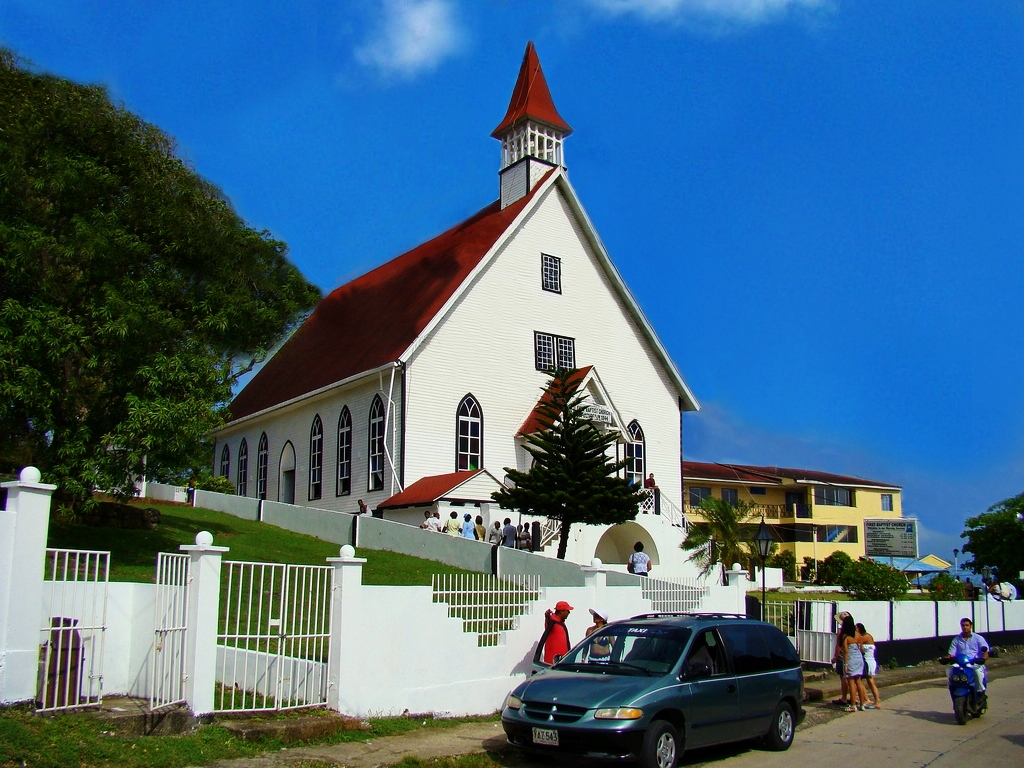
- From to top: Aerial view, Typical house, Casa Isleña Museum, Pedestrian Street, San Andres beach and San Luis Church.

- Location in Colombia
- Coordinates: 12°35′5″N 81°42′2″W
- Country: Colombia
- Region: Insular Region
- Department: San Andrés, Providencia y Santa Catalina

Area
  - Total: 27.586 km^{2} (10.651 sq mi)

Population (2005)
  - Total: 55,426
  - Density: 2,009.2/km^{2} (5,203.8/sq mi)
  - Languages spoken: San Andrés Creole English Spanish
  - Ethnic groups: 20% Raizals and 80% mainland Colombians
- Time zone: UTC-5 (Colombia Time (COT))

San Andrés (Spanish pronunciation: [ˌsan anˈdɾes]) is the largest city and capital of the Colombian department of San Andrés, Providencia and Santa Catalina. Covering a land area of 27.586 km^{2} (10.651 sq mi), it had a population of 55,426 in 2005. Its economy is driven mainly by tourism, fishing, and agriculture. The island has a tropical climate with a marine ecosystem consisting of extensive coral reefs and diverse aquatic population, supported by various protected areas.

== History ==
San Andrés was colonized by the Europeans in the 17th century, and switched hands between various colonial powers for over 200 years. The English and Spanish fought over it for years, which ended in 1786 after the signing of the Peace of Paris (1783) and Convention of London (1786), by which England recognized Spain’s sovereignty. In 1822, the islands were occupied by Colombia, and became part of the administration of the central government in 1866. In 1868, it became part of an independent territory of San Andrés, Providencia and Santa Catalina, and was made its capital in 1912. In 1991, it became the capital of the new department established by changes to the Constitution of Colombia.

== Geography ==
It is situated at the north end of San Andrés Island in the Caribbean Sea, and forms part of the Colombian archipelago of San Andrés, Providencia and Santa Catalina. It is located about 710 km (440 mi) northwest of mainland Colombia, and 180 km (110 mi) off the eastern coast of Nicaragua. Spread across an area of 27.586 km^{2} (10.651 sq mi), it has a long coastline of 36.12 km (22.44 mi). The topography consists of coastal low lands and central plains. The mean elevation is 19 m (62 ft) with the highest elevation at about 61 m (200 ft). San Andrés has a tree cover of 66%, with most vegetation composed of evergreen forests. It forms part of Colombia’s Seaflower marine conservation reserve, which included expanded protection in 2025 for remote atolls.

=== Climate ===
The island has a tropical monsoon climate, bordering on a tropical savanna climate, characterized by heavy rainfall, high humidity, and high temperatures. A distinct short dry season is followed by rainfall due to seasonal reversal of prevailing winds.

Climate data for San Andrés (Gustavo Rojas Pinilla International Airport), elevation 1 m (3.3 ft), (1971–2000)
Month	Jan	Feb	Mar	Apr	May	Jun	Jul	Aug	Sep	Oct	Nov	Dec	Year
Mean daily maximum °C (°F)	28.6 (83.5)	28.7 (83.7)	29.2 (84.6)	29.7 (85.5)	30.1 (86.2)	30.0 (86.0)	29.8 (85.6)	30.1 (86.2)	30.3 (86.5)	30.1 (86.2)	29.6 (85.3)	29 (84)	29.6 (85.3)
Daily mean °C (°F)	26.7 (80.1)	26.6 (79.9)	26.9 (80.4)	27.4 (81.3)	27.9 (82.2)	28.0 (82.4)	27.9 (82.2)	27.9 (82.2)	27.8 (82.0)	27.6 (81.7)	27.4 (81.3)	27.1 (80.8)	27.4 (81.3)
Mean daily minimum °C (°F)	25.0 (77.0)	24.8 (76.6)	25.0 (77.0)	25.6 (78.1)	26.1 (79.0)	26.1 (79.0)	26.0 (78.8)	26.1 (79.0)	26.0 (78.8)	25.5 (77.9)	25.6 (78.1)	25.2 (77.4)	25.6 (78.1)
Average precipitation mm (inches)	77.0 (3.03)	37.8 (1.49)	23.6 (0.93)	33.2 (1.31)	131.3 (5.17)	205.5 (8.09)	199.0 (7.83)	201.2 (7.92)	238.4 (9.39)	323.8 (12.75)	269.6 (10.61)	140.9 (5.55)	1,881.2 (74.06)
Average precipitation days	19	13	8	9	14	20	24	22	22	23	22	22	218
Average relative humidity (%)	80	79	78	79	82	84	83	83	83	83	83	81	82
Mean monthly sunshine hours	254.2	231.8	282.1	276.0	241.8	183.0	192.2	217.0	192.0	189.1	189.0	213.9	2,662.1
Mean daily sunshine hours	8.2	8.2	9.1	9.2	7.8	6.1	6.2	7.0	6.4	6.1	6.3	6.9	7.3
Source: Instituto de Hidrologia Meteorologia y Estudios Ambientales

== Demographics and economy ==
San Andrés had a population was 55,426 in 2005, with 80% mainland Colombians and 20% Afro-Caribbeans of Raizal descent. The economy is mainly sustained by tourism and commercial fishing. Due to the introduction of the tax free zone, it has led to a massive influx of immigrants both from the mainland Colombia as well as from other areas of the Caribbean. The Gustavo Rojas Pinilla International Airport serves the city, and there are no major ports in the vicinity. Land transportation includes buses, and private vehicles, with small boats used to traverse along the coast.
