= Thomas F. O'Neill =

American art director

- Born: April 4, 1890; Brooklyn, New York, U.S.
- Died: August 1974 (aged 84); The Bronx, New York, U.S.
- Occupation: Art director
- Years active: 1916–1935 (film)

Thomas F. O'Neill (April 4, 1890 – August 1974) was an American art director. O'Neill worked on various Universal Pictures productions. He art directed for over 21 films between 1916 and 1935.

O'Neill died in August 1974, at the age of 84.

== Selected filmography ==
- The Last Performance (1927)
- The Man Who Laughs (1928)
- Broadway (1929)
- The Unexpected Father (1932)
- Destry Rides Again (1932)
- Saturday's Millions (1933)
- Gordon of Ghost City (1933)
- The Vanishing Shadow
- The Affair of Susan (1935)
- Storm Over the Andes (1935)
