= Thomas Neill =

Thomas Neill, Neel, or Neal(e) may refer to:

- Thomas Neel (died 1410), English politician
- Thomas Neale (1641–1699), British politician
- Thomas H. Neill (1826–1885), American soldier
- Sir Thomas Neill (insurance executive) (1856–1937), British insurance executive
- Thomas Neill (cricketer) (1867–1949), New Zealand cricketer
- Tom Neale (1902–1977), New Zealand bushcraft and survival enthusiast
- Tom Neal (1914–1972), American actor
- Tommy Neill (1919–1980), American baseball player
- Tommy Neill (footballer) (1930–1996), Scottish footballer
- Thomas Neill (swimmer) (born 2002), Australian swimmer

== See also ==
- Thomas O'Neill (disambiguation)
