= Raizal =

Ethnic group in Colombia

Raizals
- Flag of the Raizal people

Total population
- 25,515 (2018 census)

Regions with significant populations
- San Andrés and Providencia

Languages
- San Andrés–Providencia Creole, English, Spanish

Religion
- Protestant, Roman Catholic

Related ethnic groups
- Afro-Colombians, Afro-Jamaicans, Afro-Nicaraguans, Miskito, English people

The Raizal (/raɪˈzɑːl/) (Note: Spanish pronunciation: [ra.iˈsal]) are a Black Colombian ethnic group from the Archipelago of San Andrés, Providencia and Santa Catalina, off Colombia's Caribbean coast. They are not defined by race but are labeled by the Colombian authorities as one of the Afro-Colombian ethnic groups under the multicultural policy pursued since 1991. They are speakers of the San Andrés–Providencia Creole, one of many English-based creole languages used in the Caribbean.

== Demographics ==
In 2005, the Raizal were 57% of the 60,000 inhabitants of the San Andrés y Providencia Department, according to official statistics, but based on the 2015 census, they are now only 39.4% of the population in the archipelago because of migration from and to mainland Colombia. Raizals are mostly multi-racial, with a majority being of West African and Northern European descent. The Raizal community in the mainland is represented by the Organización de la comunidad raizal con residencia fuera del archipiélago de San Andrés, Providencia y Santa Catalina (ORFA, based in Bogotá).

== Self-determination ==
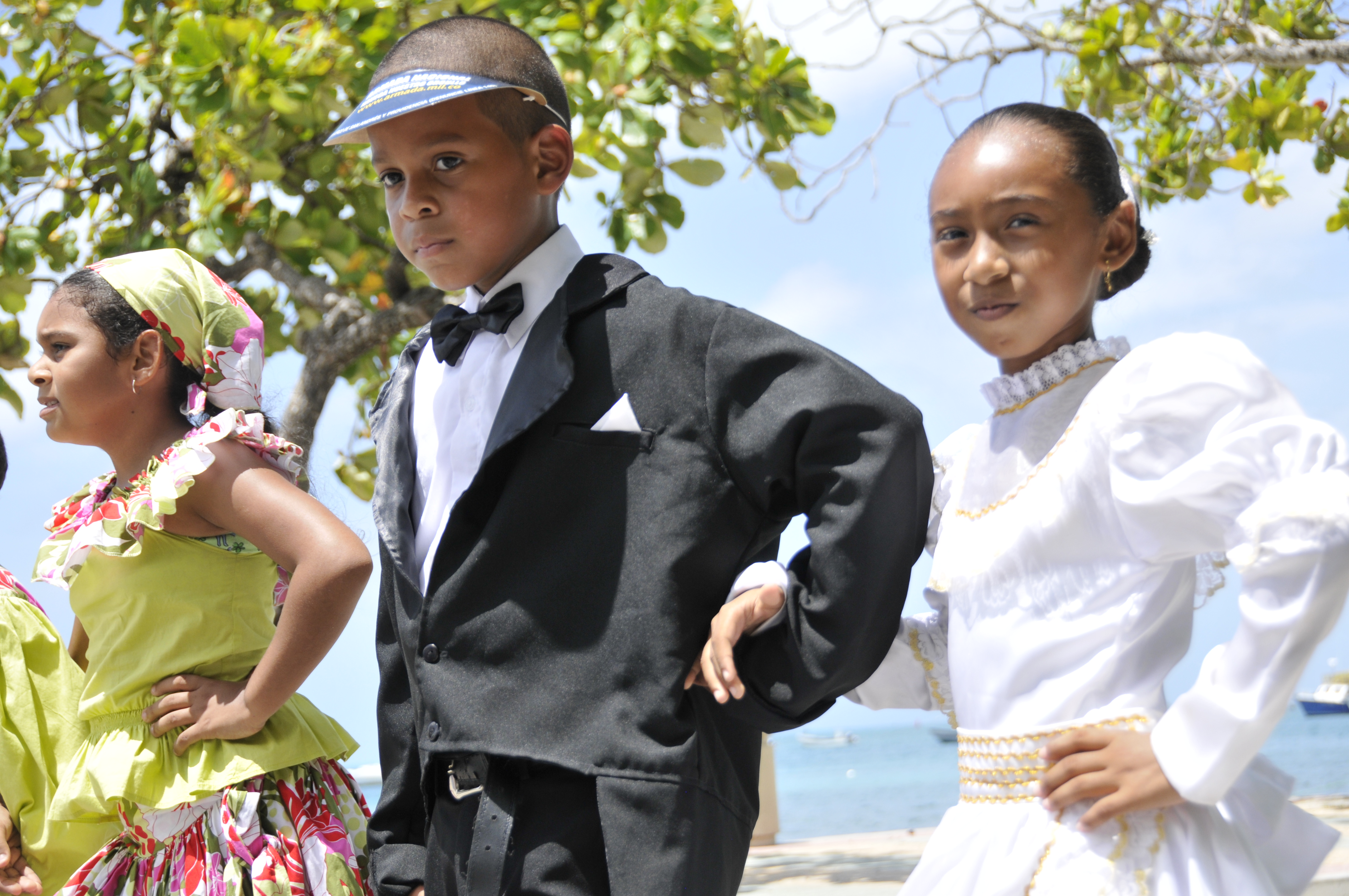
Raizal children

In 1903, the local Raizal population of the Providencia and Santa Catalina Islands rejected an offer from the United States to separate from Colombia and to imitate Panama.

Towards the late 1960s, separatist movements became active in the archipelago. The first separatists, an underground movement, were led by Marcos Archbold Britton, who addressed a memorandum to the United Nations (UN) asking for the inclusion of the archipelago in the list of colonized territories. The UN High Commissioner for Refugees (UNHCR) paid a private visit to the archipelago shortly afterwards, arousing suspicion in mainland Colombia.

The second movement, which started in the late 1970s, grew stronger in the following decade, and culminated in the creation in March 1984 of the Sons of the Soil Movement (S.O.S.), openly claiming the right to self-determination.

Since 1999, another organization, the Archipelago Movement for Ethnic Native Self-Determination (AMEN-SD), a separatist movement led by Rev. Raymond Howard Britton, has sought the creation of an independent state.

There are now, according to a document from the Colombian government, two trends among the Raizals: a radical one, the Pueblo Indígena Raizal, represented by the Indigenous Native Organizations, among whom AMEN, Barraca New Face, Infaunas (a Rastafarian-inspired group of farmers and fishermen), Ketna (Ketlënan National Association) and the SOS Foundation, and a more moderate one, Comunidad Raizal (Native Foundation and Integración Básica) led by former governors who are friends of the Colombian establishment, mainly Felix Palacios, Carlos Archbold and Alvaro Archbold N. The latter group is more ready to participate in bipartite institutions set up by the Colombian authorities.

On April 28, 2002, the Raizal people signed a declaration of self-determination and asked the Colombian government and the International Court of Justice for a major recognition of their autonomy and for appropriate resources to improve the quality of life on the island.

Colombia recognizes the Raizal as an ethnic community and guarantees collective rights under the relevant legislation. The Colombian Constitutional Court has affirmed collective rights of the Raizal in several decisions, particularly the obligation of prior consultation. These include T-701/2013 and T-800/2014, which emphasize special protection of the Raizal community in the archipelago. Article 131 of Law 1753/2015 explicitly obliges the government to submit a draft Estatuto del Pueblo Raizal to Congress after prior consultation with the community. Related initiatives and consultation processes are documented; however, no final autonomy statute has been adopted to date. Independent reports further highlight continuing shortcomings in the implementation of collective rights.

== See also ==
- Cocolos
