= San Andrés–Providencia Creole =

English-based creole language of the Afro-Caribbean Raizal people in Colombia

- Bende, Islander Creole English
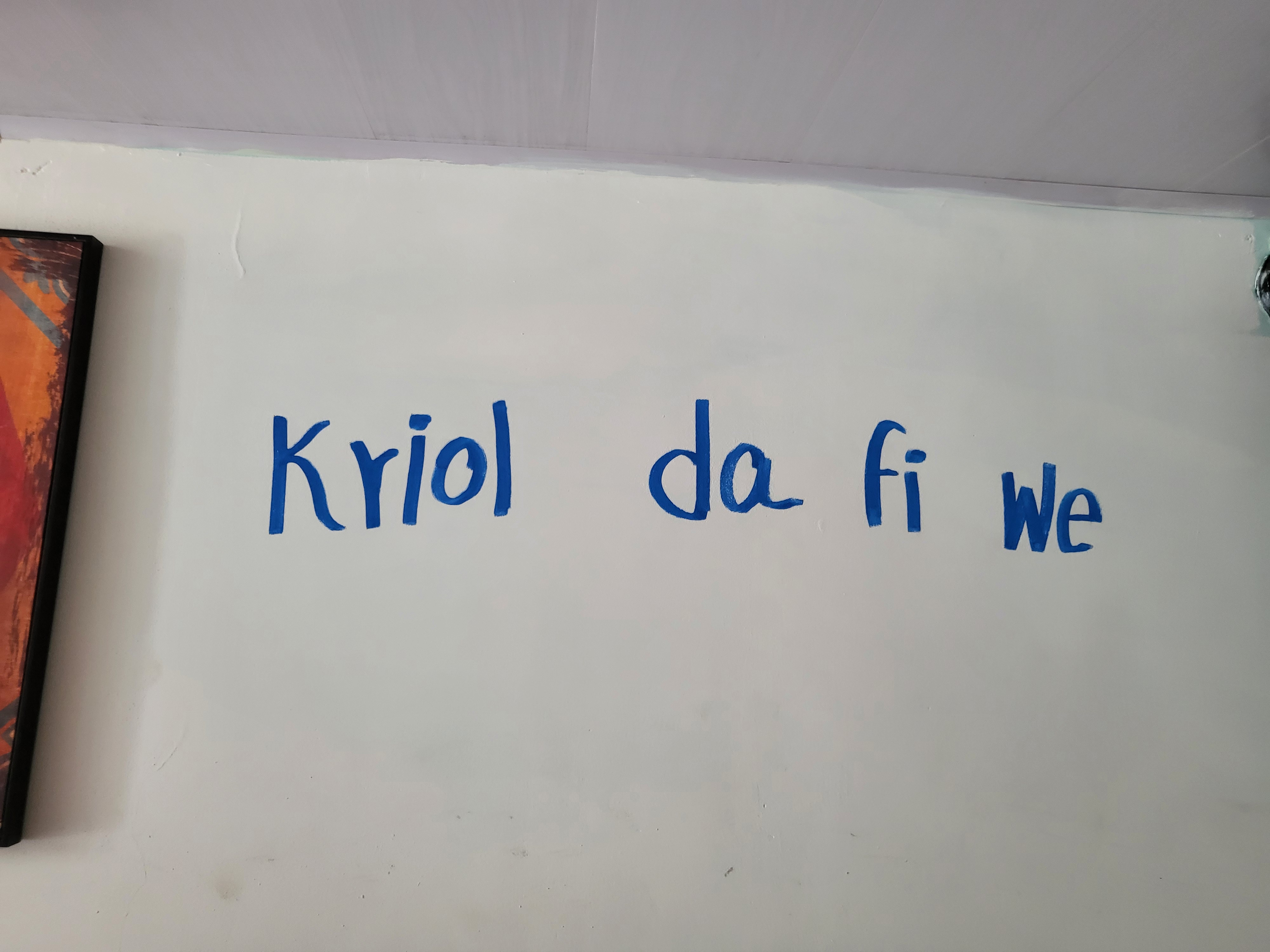
- Creole of the Island of San Andrés
- Native to: Moskitian Shore: San Andrés and Providencia islands
- Region: Insular region of Colombia
- Ethnicity: Raizal
- Native speakers: 20,000–30,000
- Language family: English Creole: Atlantic; Western; San Andrés–Providencia Creole
- Dialects: Providence Creole English; Saintandrewan

Language codes
- ISO 639-3: icr
- Glottolog: sana1297
- Linguasphere: 52-ABB-ah

San Andrés–Providencia Creole is an English-based creole language spoken in the San Andrés and Providencia Department of Colombia by the native Raizals. It is very similar to Moskitian Creole and Belizean Creole. Its vocabulary originates in English, its lexifier, but San Andrés–Providencia Creole has its own phonetics and many expressions from Spanish and African languages, particularly Kwa languages (especially Twi and Ewe) and Igbo languages. The language is also known as "San Andrés Creole," "Bende," and "Islander Creole English." Its two main strands are San Andres Creole English (or Saintandrewan) and Providence Creole English.

== History ==
The population of the Archipelago of San Andrés, Providencia and Santa Catalina uses three languages: Creole, English, and Spanish. San Andrés–Providencia Creole is an official language in its territory of influence, according to the Colombian Constitution of 1991, which guarantees the rights and protections of languages in the country. Approximately 20,000–30,000 people speak San Andrés–Providencia Creole.

San Andrés–Providencia Creole has been influenced by social and family ties with the Mosquito Coast and has in turn influenced the Central American English Creoles since the early 19th century. It retains a number of African words and phrases in common with the Nicaraguan, Belizean, and Limón creoles and with Jamaican Patois. It is closest to Belize Kriol. While many scholars often suggest a common West African pidgin as the source of most Caribbean creole languages, San Andrés Creole, in particular, may partially derive from the Jamaican Patois of the latter half of the 18th century. In contrast, Providence Islander Creole is less popular among the Native Islanders, who feel a stronger affinity for English.

Between 1902 and 1926, a process of forced Hispanization deprecated use of English and Creole. In 1946 and 1956, English was banned in, respectively, public and private schools. Large-scale migration from continental Colombia, where most people spoke Spanish, resulted in the creole people of San Andrés becoming marginalised. English remained in use for liturgical purposes in Baptist churches, but the coming of satellite television and the growth of foreign tourism have revived the use of English on the islands. The standard English taught in schools is British English and rarely San Andrés Creole.

The presence of migrants from continental Colombia and the travel of young islanders to cities like Barranquilla, Cartagena de Indias, and Bogotá for higher education have contributed to the presence of Spanish. However, the interest in preserving the Creole has become very important for locals and for Colombians in general. According to Carlos Augusto Arias, "Creole plays a symbolic role in the cohesion and identity of raizals, as the vehicle and an important piece of the cultural heritage, as well as the phenomenology of group identity."

== Phonology ==
=== Consonants ===
Consonants
	Labial		Alveolar		Post- alveolar		Palatal		Velar		Glottal
Nasal		m		n				(ɲ)^{1}		ŋ	
Stop	p	b	t	d	tʃ	dʒ	c^{2}	ɟ^{2}	k	ɡ	
Fricative	f	v	s	z	ʃ	(ʒ)^{3}			(x)^{1}		h
Approximant /Lateral				ɹ				j		w	
Approximant /Lateral				l							

^1 /ɲ/ and /x/ only occur in loanwords, e.g. nyam ‘to eat’, José (a Spanish first name).
^2 When moving towards the acrolect, speakers depalatalize /c/ and /ɟ/: kyan ‘can’ > kan, gyal ‘girl’ > gal.
^3 /ʒ/, like in okiezhan ‘occasion’, only occurs in the acrolect

=== Vowels ===
Vowels
	Front		Central		Back	
	oral	nasal	oral	nasal	oral	nasal
Close	i^{1}	ĩ^{2}			u^{1}	ũ^{2}
Mid	e	ɛ̃^{2}			o	
Open			a^{1}	ã^{2}		

^1 Short /a/, /i/, and /u/ contrast with long /aː/, /iː/, and /uː/.
^2 The duration of the nasal vowels corresponds more to the duration of the long oral vowels than of the short ones.

For some contrasts, there are very few minimal pairs: /ĩ/ contrasts with /iː/ only in ihn ‘he/she/it’ vs. iin ‘in’ (this is the form when postposed, the San Andres Creole English preposition is iina; Providence Creole English has in and ina). Similarly, /ã/ vs. /aː/ as in faahn ‘from’ vs. faam ‘to pretend’. On the other hand, other contrasts occur very frequently: /a/ vs. /aː/ as in hat ‘hot’ vs. haat ‘heart’. In addition, San Andres Creole has six minor vowel allophones: [ɪ, ʊ, ɛ, ɛː, ɔ, ɔː].

== Characteristics ==
1. It marks the time. The auxiliary wen (~ben~men) marks a past simple. Future tense is marked with wi and wuda. Progressive tense is marked by de.
2. The auxiliaries beg and mek before the sentence is a polite way to ask permission or asking something.
3. Other auxiliary words before the verb mark probability like maita, mos, mosi, kyan, and kuda; willingness with niid and waan; and obligation with fi, hafi and shuda
4. There is no grammatical distinction for gender.
5. Plural is marked with dem after the noun.

== Sample text ==
A comparison of the Lord's Prayer

San Andrés Creole

‘Fi wi Faada weh deh iina hevn,
mek wi kiip yo niem huoly.
Mek yo Kingdom kom,
ahn mek weh yuu waahn fi hapm,
hapm pan ort, jos laik how ih deh hapm iina hevn.
Pliiz gi wi di fuud weh wi niid evry die,
ahn fargiv wi sin dem,
jos laik wii fargiv evrybady weh du wi bad tingz tu.
Ahn kiip wi weh fahn temtieshan,
ahn fahn di Bad Wan weh waahn liid wi astrie.

English

Our Father in heaven,
hallowed be Your name.
Your kingdom come,
Your will be done,
on earth, as it is in heaven.
Give us this day our daily bread,
and forgive us our debts,
as we also have forgiven our debtors.
And lead us not into temptation,
but deliver us from evil.

== See also ==
- Belizean Creole
- Caribbean English
- English-based creole languages
- Jamaican Patwah
- Miskito Coast Creole
- Spanish-based creole languages
