= Santa Catalina Island (Colombia) =

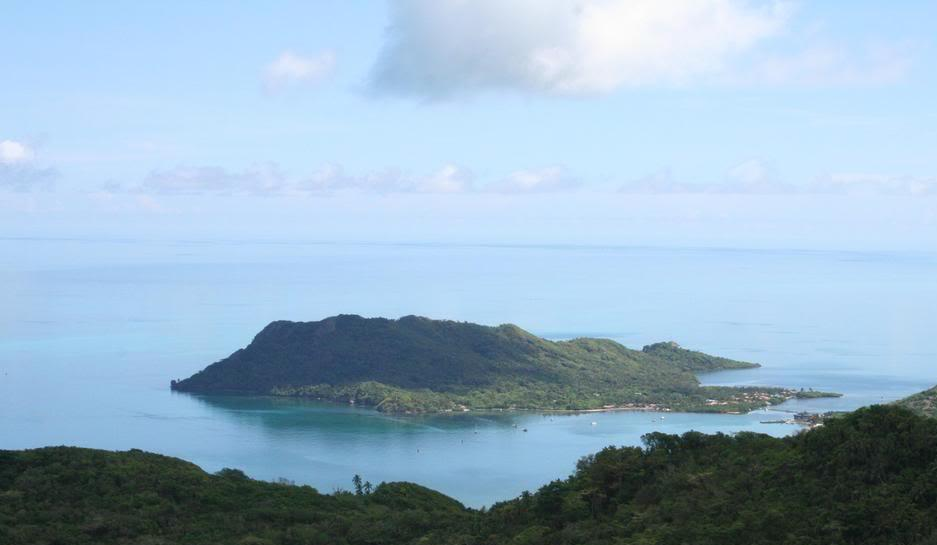
- Interactive map of Santa Catalina Island
- Coordinates: 13°23′18″N 81°22′25″W
- Country: Colombia
- Department: San Andrés, Providencia and Santa Catalina

Population (2018)
  - Total: 194

Santa Catalina Island is a small Colombian island in the Caribbean Sea. It belongs to the San Andrés y Providencia Department of Colombia and is the northernmost island politically part of South America. The island has two bays: Old John Bay and Eliza Bay.

It is connected by a 100-metre (330 ft) footbridge to its larger sister Providencia Island, to the south.

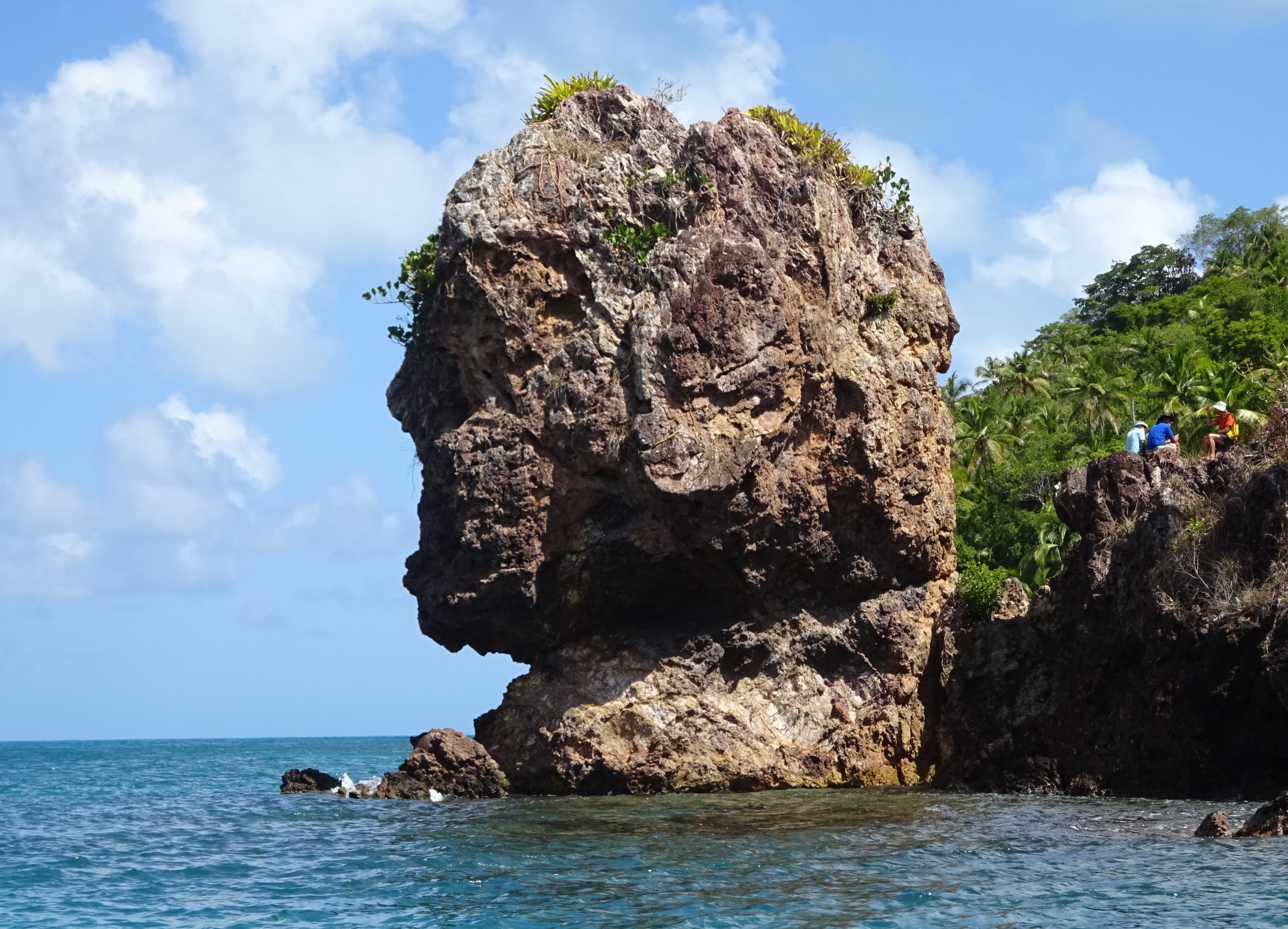
The Head of Morgan, a rock formation on the island of Santa Catalina

It has a dry climate with two annual rain periods.
