= Esguerra-Bárcenas Treaty =

Territorial cession treaty from Nicaragua to Colombia

The Esguerra-Bárcenas Treaty, also known as the Bárcenas Meneses-Esguerra Treaty or the Treaty of 1928, was signed by Colombia and Nicaragua on March 24, 1928, in Managua. After each government ratified the treaty, the ratifications were exchanged under the Protocol of 1930, marking the treaty's entry into force. Under the terms of the treaty, Nicaragua recognized Colombia's sovereignty over the Archipelago of San Andrés, Providencia and Santa Catalina, while Colombia recognized Nicaragua's sovereignty over most of the Mosquito Coast. Meanwhile, the cays of Serranilla, Quitasueño, Serrana, and Roncador were excluded from the treaty since they were claimed by the United States and Colombia at the time.

In 1980 the Junta of National Reconstruction of Nicaragua invalidated the Esguerra-Bárcenas Treaty, arguing that since it was signed during the United States occupation, Nicaragua may have signed the treaty under duress; they further argued that the Archipelago of San Andrés and Providencia were part and parcel of the Nicaraguan Continental shelf.

In 2001, Nicaragua declared that they disputed the agreement and filed a formal complaint before the International Court of Justice in The Hague, claiming maritime boundaries east of longitude 82 of Greenwich, whilst disputing sovereignty over parts of the archipelago of San Andrés. On December 13, 2007, the International Court of Justice recognized the full sovereignty of Colombia over the islands of San Andrés, Providencia and Santa Catalina, and recognized Colombian sovereignty over the cays of Serranilla, Quitasueño, Serrana, Roncador and Bajo Nuevo. The question of maritime delimitation was tenuously answered, but the Court ruled Colombia's 1969 claim that Nicaragua's maritime boundary was the 82 West Meridian was illegal.

== Background ==
The Mosquito Coast and the nearby Archipelago of San Andrés and Providencia had been under the jurisdiction of the Captaincy General of Guatemala, a division of the Spanish Empire. In 1803, its administration was transferred by Royal Order to the Viceroyalty of New Granada, which was deemed to be in a better position to defend the Caribbean coast between Chagres, Panama, to Cabo Gracias a Dios, at the border of Nicaragua and Honduras.

Although the 1803 Royal Order was invalidated by another Royal Order in 1806, it became the basis for Columbia's claim to the territory beginning in 1824, when someone accidentally discovered the 1803 order among the papers of the Viceroyalty of New Granada.

A series of decisions by colonial powers such as France, England and the United States left the fate of the territory unresolved into the twentieth century. In 1914, Colombia protested the Chamorro-Bryan Treaty, which gave the United States the right to build an interocean canal through Nicaraguan territory, including the Mosquito Coast. Nicaragua was militarily and politically occupied by the United States in 1924.
