= Colombia–Nicaragua relations =

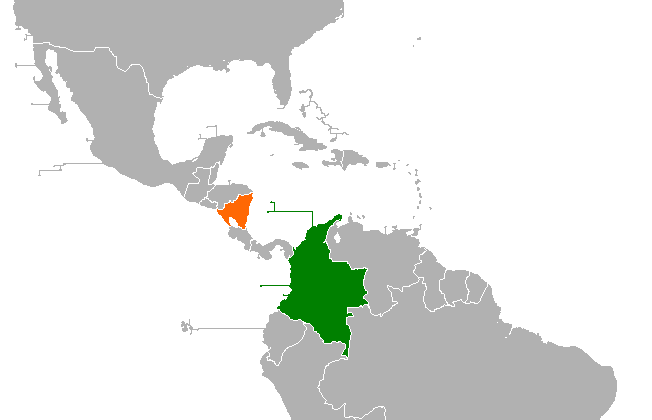

- Colombia: Nicaragua

The relationship between the Colombia and Nicaragua has evolved amid conflicts over the San Andrés y Providencia Islands located in the Caribbean Sea close to the Nicaraguan shoreline and the maritime boundaries covering 150,000 km^{2} that included the islands of San Andrés, Providencia and Santa Catalina and the banks of Roncador, Serrana, Serranilla and Quitasueño as well as the 82nd meridian west which Colombia claims as a border but which the International Court has sided with Nicaragua in disavowing. The sea around the archipelago has been under Colombian control since 1931 when a treaty was signed during US occupation of Nicaragua, giving Colombia control over the area. Both nations are members of the Association of Caribbean States, Community of Latin American and Caribbean States, Organization of American States, Organization of Ibero-American States and the United Nations.

== History ==
=== San Andres archipelago and maritime dispute ===
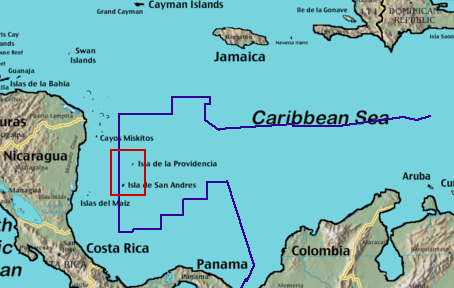
Location of San Andres y Providencia archipelago

Colombia considered that the Esguerra-Bárcenas Treaty signed between 1928 and 1930 supported their claim on the sovereignty over the islands. They exchanged ratification of the treaty in Bogotá on 5 May 1930.

Nicaragua considered the Esguerra-Bárcenas treaty invalid and argued that at the time it was signed, Nicaragua was invaded by the United States. It also appealed to the Pact of Bogota of 1948, under article 31 of which both countries agreed to comply with the International Court of Justice (ICJ). Colombia considers this pact as invalid since article 6 in the same document specifies that the pact would not apply to previously resolved disputes referring to the Esguerra-Bárcenas treaty.

The Junta of National Reconstruction declared the Esguerra-Bárcenas Treaty null and void on 1 February 1980 and said that the San Andrés y Providencia archipelago was Nicaraguan.

Honduras ratified a treaty signed with Colombia on 30 November 1999 delimiting borders in the Caribbean Sea. Nicaragua said that the treaty was taking some 130,000 km^{2} of Nicaraguan continental platform.

==== International Court of Justice case ====
On December 6, 2001, Nicaragua filed a complaint against Colombia at the International Court of Justice (ICJ) in an attempt to resolve the dispute. The Colombian government protested Nicaragua's calling for international oil companies to explore maritime waters that are under its claimed maritime territory in July 2002. Nicaragua protested against Colombia for publishing a map that affected the "sovereignty and national integrity" of Nicaragua in January 2003. Nicaragua presented their preliminary objections at the ICJ in April, and Colombia presented theirs in July. President of Nicaragua Enrique Bolaños declared that Colombia was going to accept the ICJ's resolution in October. Nicaragua appealed to the Colombian claims at the ICJ in January 2004.

Colombia challenged the ICJ's jurisdiction over the case in July 2007. President of Colombia Álvaro Uribe paraded with the military in San Andres Island the same month, celebrating the independence of Colombia in the archipelago.

President of Nicaragua Daniel Ortega also claimed that Colombia was too far from San Andres to have sovereignty over these and also accused Colombia of being "imperialist" and "expansionist". On December 12, 2007, Ortega also ordered the Nicaraguan military to be prepared for conflict with Colombia. The Colombian government answered that they would wait for the ICJ resolution and were going to ignore Ortega.

On December 13, 2007, the International Court of Justice was set to resolve at 10 AM. The court finally concluded the long time dispute in favor of Colombia over the sovereignty over the San Andres Archipelago but also said that it had jurisdiction over the other aspects of the maritime dispute. President Ortega of Nicaragua stirred controversy after making remarks over the Humanitarian exchange process the Colombian government and the FARC guerrilla are undergoing to exchange hostages for prisoners. Ortega called the FARC "brothers" to free political prisoner Ingrid Betancourt and said that Betancourt death could be used to blame it on the FARC.

On 19 November 2012, the ICJ decided this case by upholding Colombia's sovereignty over San Andres y Providencia, and other disputed islands. It also settled the maritime boundaries, allocating about 40% of the maritime territory in the west of San Andrés to Nicaragua.

In September 2021, the International Court of Justice heard Nicaragua and Colombia on "alleged violations of sovereign rights and maritime spaces in the Caribbean sea". Nicaragua argues Colombia doesn't want to comply with the ICJ's ruling while Colombia claims Nicaragua violates "inalienable rights" of the Raizals.

==== Unresolved maritime dispute ====
The Colombian newspaper El Espectador said that Nicaragua could gain territory in this way by setting a new trial to resolve the maritime boundaries that were not previously established in any of the accords or treaties and the Roncador, Quitasueño y Serrana banks. Regarding this Colombia used as border the 82° meridian while Nicaragua wants to expand and gain territory.

Ex-President of Colombia Álvaro Uribe and Minister of Foreign Affairs Fernando Araújo expressed that Colombia needs to prove that the banks are also part of Colombia. President Uribe said that at the moment the Esguerra-Bárcenas treaty was signed there was nothing stipulated about the banks because Colombia was contesting them with the United States to resolve the sovereignty over these, but not because Nicaragua was claiming these and pointed out that Colombia had already been generous to Nicaragua by ceding the Mosquito Coast which had been previously claimed by Colombia.

=== War in Central America ===
In 1985 during the Sandinista revolution in Nicaragua, Colombia headed by President Belisario Betancur was part of the Contadora Group along Panama, Mexico and Venezuela. The United Nations-supported group intended to promote peace in El Salvador, Nicaragua and Guatemala, which were engulfed in internal armed conflicts.

== Ortega's humanitarian exchange remarks ==
On December 14, 2007, President Ortega of Nicaragua stirred controversy after making remarks over the Humanitarian exchange process the Colombian government and the FARC guerrilla are undergoing to exchange hostages for prisoners. Ortega opined about the issue calling the FARC "brothers" to free political prisoner Ingrid Betancourt and said that Betancourt's death could be used to cast blame on the FARC.

The Colombian government regarded these remarks as an intervention in internal Colombian affairs and issued a note of protest to Nicaragua. The Colombian government did not consider appropriate the "familiarized language" used to refer to the head of a "narcoterrorist organization".

== See also ==
- Foreign relations of Colombia
- Foreign relations of Nicaragua
- Territorial disputes of Nicaragua
