= Insular area =

U.S. territory that is neither a state nor the District of Columbia

Locations of the insular areas of the United States, color-coded to indicate status The 50 states and the District of Columbia Incorporated unorganized territory Unincorporated organized territory Unincorporated organized territory with Commonwealth status Unincorporated unorganized territory Compact of Free Association

In the law of the United States, an insular area is a U.S.-associated jurisdiction that is not part of a U.S. state or the District of Columbia (Washington, D.C.). This includes fourteen U.S. territories administered under U.S. sovereignty, as well as three sovereign states each with a Compact of Free Association with the United States. The term also may be used to refer to the previous status of the Swan Islands, Hawaii, and the Philippines, as well as the Trust Territory of the Pacific Islands when it existed.

Three of the U.S. territories are in the Caribbean Sea, eleven are in the Pacific Ocean, and all three freely associated states are also in the Pacific. Two additional Caribbean territories are disputed and administered by Colombia.

Article IV, Section 3, Clause 2 of the U.S. Constitution grants to the United States Congress the responsibility of overseeing the territories. (Note: Although an archaism, some older federal statutes and regulations still in force refer to insular areas as insular possessions.) A series of U.S. Supreme Court decisions known as the Insular Cases created a distinction between "incorporated territories", where the full Constitution of the United States applies, and "unincorporated territories", where only basic protections apply. The only current incorporated territory, Palmyra Atoll, is uninhabited.

A U.S. territory is considered "organized" when the U.S. Congress passes an organic act for it. Three of the U.S. territories with a permanent non-military population have constitutions, and all five have locally elected territorial legislatures and executives, and some degree of political autonomy. Four of the five are "organized", but American Samoa is technically "unorganized" and subject to the direct jurisdiction of the Office of Insular Affairs.

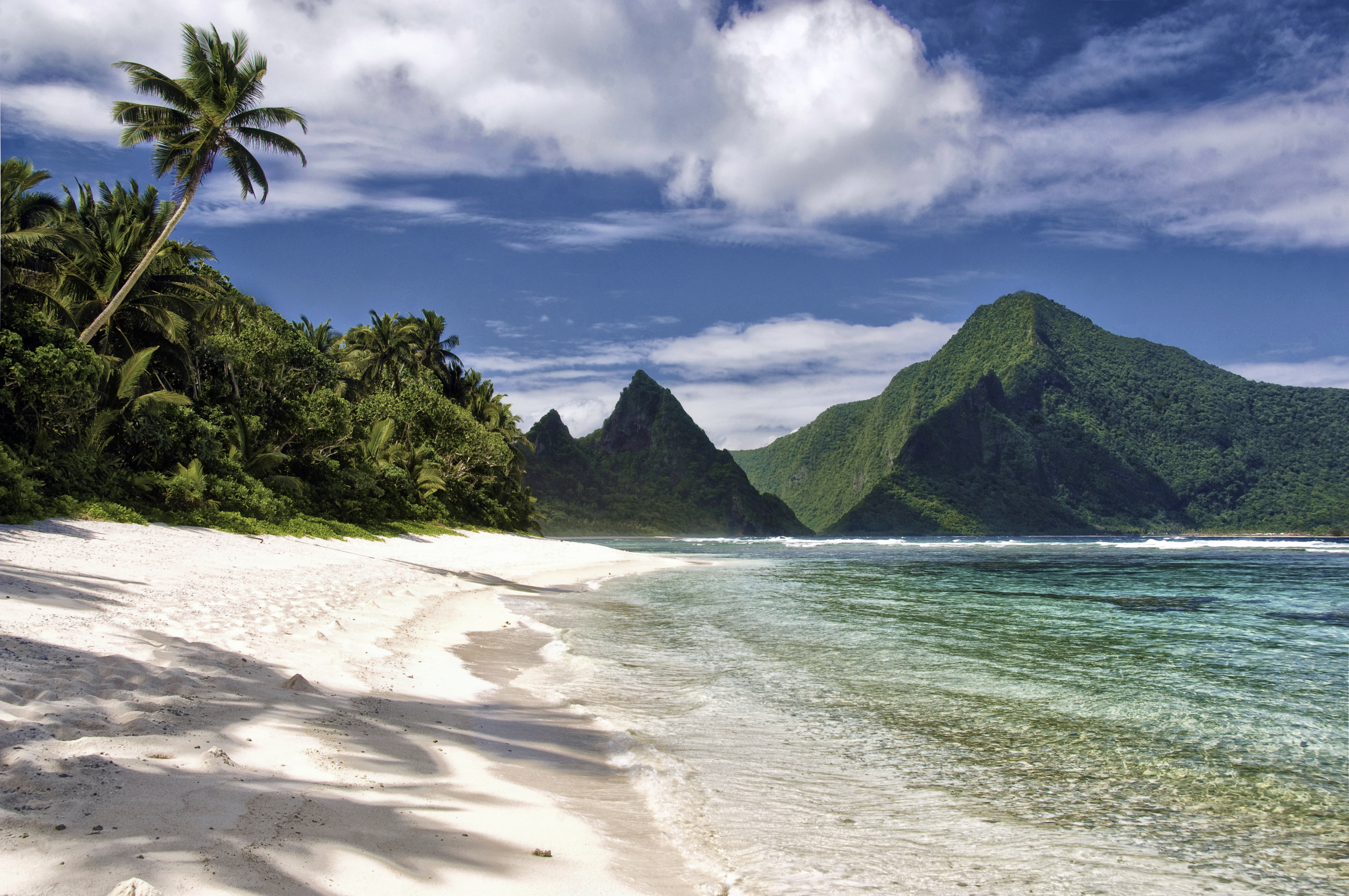
Beach in American Samoa

== History ==
The first insular areas that the United States occupied were Baker Island, Howland Island, and Navassa Island (1857). Then Johnston Atoll and Jarvis Island (both in 1858) would be claimed. After the Spanish–American War in 1898, several territories were taken that are still under U.S. sovereignty (Puerto Rico and Guam, both in 1898). Palmyra Atoll was annexed along with the Republic of Hawaii (formerly a Kingdom) that same year. American Samoa was reclaimed the following year (1899). In 1917, at the height of World War I, Denmark sold the Danish Virgin Islands to the United States.

The U.S. Navy annexed Kingman Reef in 1922. Spain had sold the Northern Mariana Islands to Germany in 1899. The islands passed to Japan, which in turn lost them to the United States in 1945 after the end of World War II.

The Marshall Islands became self-governing in 1979 and fully independent along with the Federated States of Micronesia in 1986. Palau achieved independence in 1994. The three countries maintain sovereignty with free association status with the United States, which provides them with defense assistance and economic resources.

=== Timeline ===
August 28, 1867
Captain William Reynolds of the USS Lackawanna formally took possession of the Midway Atoll for the United States.
August 13, 1898
United States Navy under Admiral George Dewey, United States Army's Eighth Army Corps under Major General Wesley Merritt, and Lieutenant General Arthur MacArthur Jr. captured the city of Manila from Spain after Governor-General of the Philippines Fermin Jáudenes surrendered the city, which then remained Spanish-occupied even after the declaration of Philippine Independence from Spain and the establishment of the First Philippine Republic on June 12, 1898.
February 4, 1899
Philippine–American War began between the First Philippine Republic and the newly arrived US Military Government.
April 11, 1899
The Treaty of Paris of 1898 came into effect, transferring Guam, the Philippines, and Puerto Rico from Spain to the United States, all three becoming unorganized, unincorporated territories. Puerto Rico's official name was changed to Porto Rico, a phonetic reinterpretation of the Spanish name for the territory.
April 12, 1900
The Foraker Act becomes effective, making Puerto Rico an unincorporated and organized territory of the United States.
June 7, 1900
The United States took control of the portion of the Samoan Islands given to it by the Treaty of Berlin of 1899, creating the unorganized, unincorporated territory of American Samoa.
April 1, 1901
General Emilio Aguinaldo, President of the First Philippine Republic and Filipino leader in the Philippine–American War, surrendered to the United States, allowing the U.S. to form a civilian government for the Philippines.
August 29, 1916
The Philippine Autonomy Act or Jones Law was signed, promising the Philippines independence.
March 2, 1917
Jones–Shafroth Act reorganized Puerto Rico. This act conferred United States citizenship on all citizens of Puerto Rico.
March 31, 1917
The United States purchased the Danish West Indies and renamed it as U.S. Virgin Islands under the terms of a treaty with Denmark.
May 17, 1932
The name of Porto Rico was changed to Puerto Rico.
March 24, 1934
The Tydings–McDuffie Act was signed allowing the creation of the Commonwealth of the Philippines.
November 15, 1935
The Commonwealth of the Philippines officially inaugurated Manuel L. Quezon as the President of the Philippine Commonwealth, held at the steps of the Old Legislative Building. The event was attended by 300,000 Filipinos.
December 8, 1941
Commonwealth of the Philippines was invaded and occupied by Japan during World War II, initiating "the most destructive event ever to take place on U.S. soil". Over 1,100,000 Filipino American civilians died during the war.
February 3 - March 3, 1945
The month long Liberation of Manila led by General Douglas MacArthur took place, and consequently resulted in Manila Massacre committed by the Japanese forces throughout the Battle of Manila. An estimated 100,000 Manila civilians were killed during the massacre.
August 1945
The United States regains full control of its colony of the Philippines following the Philippines campaign.
July 4, 1946
The United States formally recognized the Philippine independence, establishing the Third Philippine Republic, which inaugurated Manuel Roxas as the President of the independent Philippines. The independence ceremonies and inauguration rites were held at the Quirino Grandstand.
July 14, 1947
The United Nations granted the Trust Territory of the Pacific Islands to the United States, consisting primarily of many islands fought over during World War II, and including what is now the Marshall Islands, the Carolina Islands, Federated States of Micronesia, Northern Mariana Islands, and Palau. It was a trusteeship, and not a territory of the United States.
August 5, 1947
The Privileges and Immunities Clause regarding the rights, privileges, and immunities of citizens of the United States was expressly extended to Puerto Rico by the U.S. Congress through federal law codified in Title 48 the United States Code as 48 U.S.C. § 737 and signed by President Harry S. Truman. This law indicates that the rights, privileges, and immunities of citizens of the United States shall be respected in Puerto Rico to the same extent as though Puerto Rico were a State of the Union and subject to the provisions of paragraph 1 of section 2 of article IV of the Constitution of the United States.
July 1, 1950
The Guam Organic Act came into effect, organizing Guam as an unincorporated territory.
July 25, 1952
Puerto Rico becomes a Commonwealth of the United States with the ratification of its constitution.
July 22, 1954
The organic act for the United States Virgin Islands went into effect, making them an unincorporated, organized territory.
July 1, 1967
American Samoa's constitution became effective. Even though no organic act was passed, this move to self-government made American Samoa similar to an organized territory.
September 12, 1967
Article Three of the United States Constitution, was expressly extended to the United States District Court for the District of Puerto Rico by the U.S. Congress through the federal law 89-571, 80 Stat. 764, this law was signed by President Lyndon B. Johnson.
January 1, 1978
The Northern Mariana Islands left the Trust Territory of the Pacific Islands to become a commonwealth of the United States, making them an unincorporated and organized territory.
January 9, 1978
The Northern Mariana Islands Commonwealth Constitution, which had been ratified by voters on March 6, 1977, goes into effect.
October 21, 1986
The Marshall Islands attained independence from the Trust Territory of the Pacific Islands, though the trusteeship granted by the United Nations technically did not end until December 22, 1990. The Marshall Islands remained in free association with the United States.
November 3, 1986
The Federated States of Micronesia attained independence from the Trust Territory of the Pacific Islands, and remained in free association with the United States.
December 22, 1990
The United Nations terminated the Trust Territory of the Pacific Islands for all but the Palau district.
May 25, 1994
The United Nations terminated the Trust Territory of the Pacific Islands for the Palau district, ending the territory and making Palau de facto independent, as it was not a territory of the United States.
October 1, 1994
Palau attained de jure independence, but it remained in free association with the United States.
December 11, 2012
The Legislative Assembly of Puerto Rico enacted a concurrent resolution to request the president and the Congress of the United States to respond diligently and effectively, and to act on the demand of the people of Puerto Rico, as freely and democratically expressed in the plebiscite held on November 6, 2012, to end, once and for all, its current form of territorial status and to begin the process to admit Puerto Rico to the union as a state.
December 22, 2022
The U.S. House of Representatives voted in favor of the Puerto Rico Status Act. The act sought to resolve Puerto Rico's status and its relationship to the United States through a binding plebiscite to be held in November 2023; however, the Senate never acted on the bill.
April 20, 2023
Puerto Rico Status Act re-introduced in U.S. House with the plebiscite to be held in November 2025.

== Citizenship ==
Congress has extended citizenship rights by birth to all inhabited territories except American Samoa, and these citizens may vote and run for office in any U.S. jurisdiction in which they are residents. The people of American Samoa are U.S. nationals by place of birth, or they are U.S. citizens by parentage, or naturalization after residing in a State for three months. Nationals are free to move around and seek employment within the United States without immigration restrictions, but cannot vote or hold office outside American Samoa.

== Political representation ==
Each of the five inhabited areas: Puerto Rico, American Samoa, Guam, the Northern Mariana Islands and the United States Virgin Islands, has a non-voting member in the United States House of Representatives.

== Taxation ==
Residents of the five major populated insular areas do not pay U.S. federal income taxes but are required to pay other U.S. federal taxes such as import and export taxes, federal commodity taxes, Social Security taxes, etc. Individuals working for the federal government pay federal income taxes while all residents are required to pay federal payroll taxes (Social Security and Medicare). According to IRS Publication 570, income from other U.S. Pacific Ocean insular areas (Howland, Baker, Jarvis, Johnston, Midway, Palmyra, and Wake Islands, and Kingman Reef) is fully taxable as income of United States residents.

Puerto Rico is inside the main domestic customs territory of the United States, but the other insular areas are outside it; tariff treatment varies (see Foreign trade of the United States § Customs territory).

== Associated states ==
The U.S. State Department and the U.S. Code also use the term "insular area" to refer not only to territories under the sovereignty of the United States, but also those independent nations that have signed a Compact of Free Association with the United States. While these nations participate in many otherwise domestic programs, and full responsibility for their military defense rests with the United States, they are legally distinct from the United States and their inhabitants are neither U.S. citizens nor nationals.

== Current insular areas by political status ==
The following islands, or island groups, are considered insular areas:

=== Incorporated organized territories ===
N/A

=== Incorporated unorganized territory ===
One (uninhabited)

- Palmyra Atoll – U.S. Territory of Palmyra Island (mostly owned by the Federal Government and The Nature Conservancy; administered by the U.S. Fish and Wildlife Service)

=== Unincorporated organized territories ===
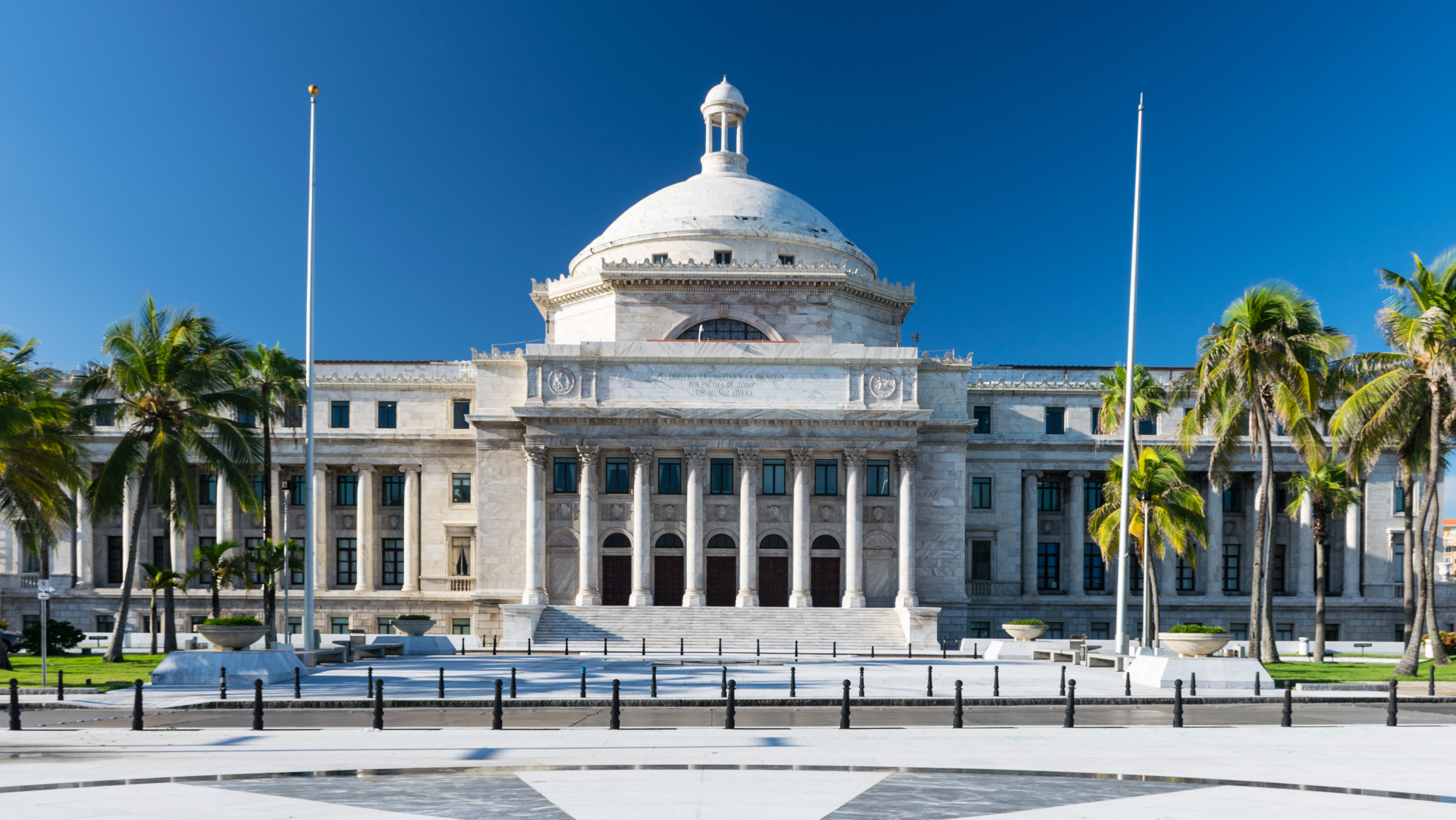
Capitol of Puerto Rico, the largest insular area

Four (inhabited)

- Guam (organized under the Guam Organic Act of 1950)
- Northern Mariana Islands (Commonwealth, organized under the 1975 Covenant)
- Puerto Rico (Commonwealth, organized under the 1900 Foraker Act)
- U.S. Virgin Islands (organized under the 1954 Revised Organic Act of the Virgin Islands)

=== Unincorporated unorganized territories ===
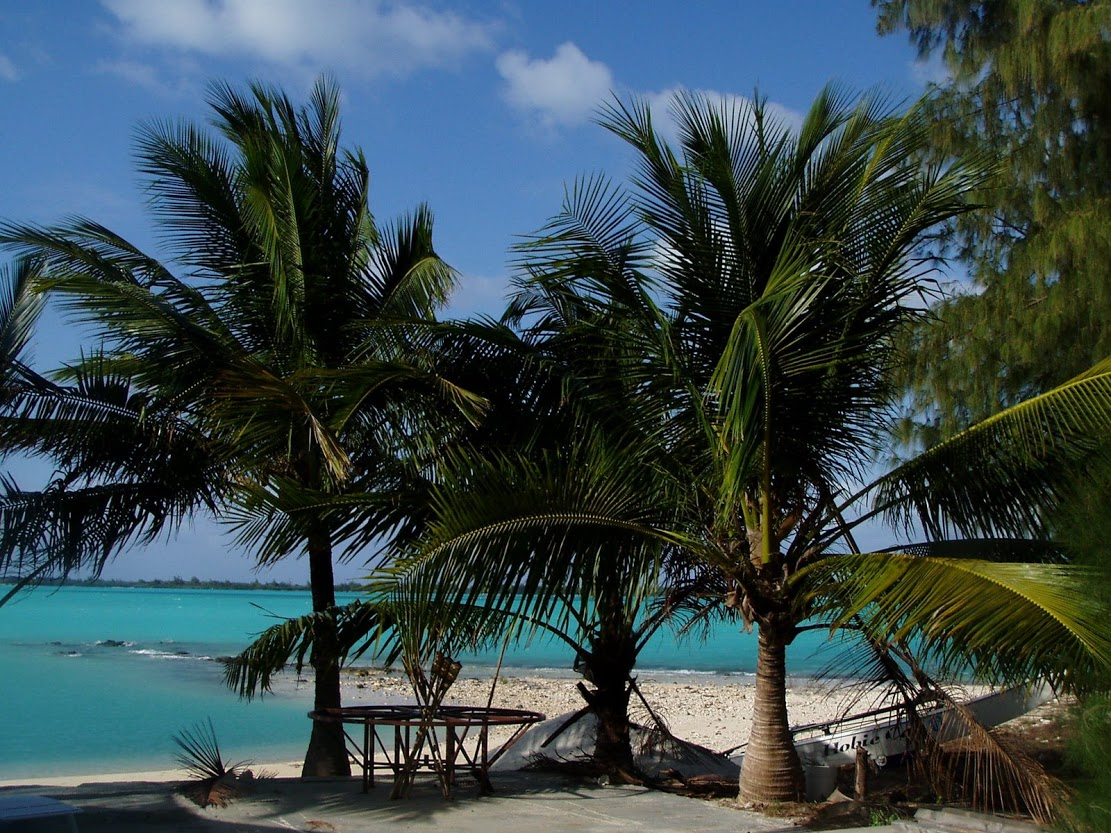
Wake Island lagoon

One (inhabited)

- American Samoa (self-governing even though officially unorganized and under the authority of the U.S. Department of the Interior)

Six (uninhabited)

- Baker Island (administered as a National Wildlife Refuge)
- Howland Island (administered as a National Wildlife Refuge)
- Jarvis Island (administered as a National Wildlife Refuge)
- Johnston Atoll (administered as a National Wildlife Refuge)
- Kingman Reef (administered as a National Wildlife Refuge)
- Midway Atoll (administered as a National Wildlife Refuge)

Two (uninhabited, disputed)

- Navassa Island (administered as a National Wildlife Refuge; claimed by Haiti)
- Wake Island (administered by the U.S. Air Force; claimed by the Marshall Islands)

=== Claimed territories ===
Two (uninhabited, claimed)

- Bajo Nuevo Bank (disputed with Colombia and Jamaica; administered by Colombia as a part of San Andrés and Providencia)
- Serranilla Bank (disputed with Colombia and Jamaica; administered by Colombia as a part of San Andrés and Providencia)

=== Freely associated states ===
Three sovereign UN member states which were all formerly in the U.S. administered United Nations Trust Territory and are currently in free association with the United States. The U.S. provides national defense, funding, and access to social services.

- Marshall Islands
- Micronesia
- Palau

After achieving independence from the Trust Territory of the Pacific Islands, these states are no longer under U.S. sovereignty and thus not considered part of the United States. Some programs in these states are administered by the U.S. Office of Insular Affairs, along with other federal entities such as the Department of Defense.

== Former insular areas ==
- Trust Territory of the Pacific Islands (1947–1994): U.N. trust territory administered by the U.S.; included the Marshall Islands, the Federated States of Micronesia, Palau, and the Commonwealth of the Northern Mariana Islands.
- Philippines: military government, 1899–1902; insular government, 1902–1935; commonwealth government, 1935–1942 and 1945–1946 (islands under Japanese occupation, 1942–1945 and puppet state, 1943–1945); granted independence on July 4, 1946, by the Treaty of Manila.
- Hawaii: republican government, 1898–1900; territorial government, 1900–1959; became the State of Hawaii and the incorporated, unorganized territory of Palmyra Atoll on August 21, 1959.
- Swan Islands (1863–1972): claimed by the U.S. under the Guano Islands Act; sovereignty ceded to Honduras in a 1972 treaty.
- Quita Sueño Bank, Roncador Bank and Serrana Bank: claimed by the U.S. under the Guano Islands Act; claims relinquished in the Vásquez-Saccio Treaty with Colombia in 1972.
- Caroline Island, Kirimati, Flint Island, Malden Island, Starbuck Island, Vostok Island, Birnie Island, Gardner Island, Orona, McKean Island, Manra, Rawaki, Canton Island and Enderbury Island: claimed by the U.S. under the Guano Islands Act; claims ceded to Kiribati.
- Funafuti, Nukufetau, Nukulaelae and Niulakita: claimed by the U.S. under the Guano Islands Act; claims ceded to Tuvalu.
- Pukapuka, Manihiki, Penrhyn and Rakahanga: claimed by the U.S. under the Guano Islands Act; claims ceded to the Cook Islands.
- Atafu, Fakaofo and Nukunonu: claimed by the U.S. under the Guano Islands Act; claims ceded to Tokelau.

== See also ==
- Dependent territory
- Insular Cases
- List of states and territories of the United States
- Protectorate
- Territorial evolution of the United States
- Territories of the United States on stamps
