= Colombia–Jamaica relations =

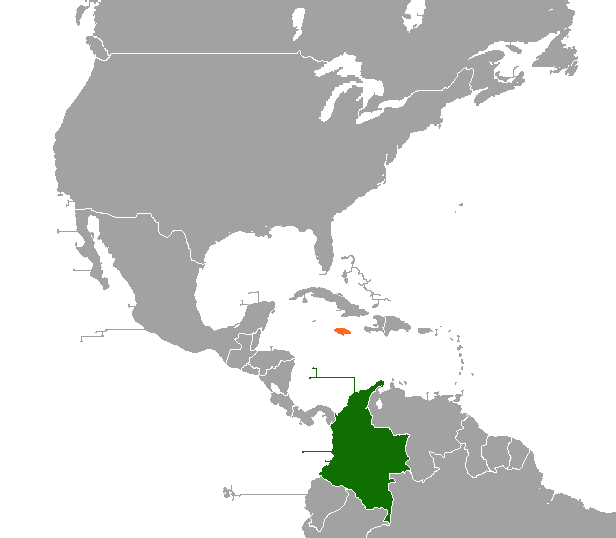

- Colombia: Jamaica

Diplomatic mission
- Embassy of Colombia in Kingston: Embassy of Jamaica in Bogotá

Envoy
- Ambassador Diana Patricia Aguilar Pulido: Ambassador Elaine Townsend de Sánchez

Colombia–Jamaica relations are bilateral relations between the Republic of Colombia and Jamaica. Both countries have maintained a friendly relationship since the 20th century, although the history of bilateral relations dates back to the beginning of both states.

== History ==
The relationship can be dated back to the time when both countries belonged to the Spanish Empire and the British Empire respectively. In 1741 Edward Vernon set sail from Port Royal bound for Cartagena de Indias, where the Siege of Cartagena de Indias took place in which British troops were defeated.

In the 19th century, during the Colombian War of Independence, Simón Bolívar took refuge on the island, during which time he wrote the Jamaica Letter.

Both governments established diplomatic relations in 1968.

== Border ==
The border between Colombia and Jamaica is an international maritime boundary that runs through the Caribbean Sea, it is defined by the Sanín-Robertson Treaty, signed on 12 November 1993 in Kingston by the foreign ministers of both countries, Noemí Sanín for Colombia and Paul Douglas Robertson for Jamaica, and approved by the Congress of the Republic of Colombia on 10 December 1993 through Law No. 91.

The border between both countries is defined as the straight line that runs between the coordinate points 14°44′10″N 74°30′50″W y 15°02′00″N 73°27′30″W.

The border is demarcated by the points:

1. 16°04′15″N 79°50′32″W
2. 16°04′15″N 79°29′20″W
3. 16°10′10″N 79°29′20″W
4. 16°10′10″N 79°16′40″W
5. 16°04′15″N 79°16′40″W
6. 16°04′15″N 78°25′50″W
7. 15°36′00″N 78°25′50″W
8. 15°36′00″N 78°38′00″W
9. 14°29′37″N 78°38′00″W
10. 14°15′00″N 78°19′30″W
11. 14°05′00″N 77°40′00″W
12. 14°44′10″N 74°30′50″W

Article 3 of the agreement establishes a Common Regime Area, which corresponds to a joint administration zone for the control, exploration and extraction of living and non-living resources. This zone, vaguely triangular in shape, includes several islands in the region (Serranilla Bank, Alice Shoal and Bajo Nuevo Bank), although they are excluded from the common area and are under Colombian sovereignty.

== Trade ==
Colombia exported products worth 102,784 thousand dollars, the main products being petroleum, products related to light industry and products related to the agricultural industry, while Jamaica exported products worth 190 thousand dollars, the main products being paper and products related to the agro-industrial industry.

== Diplomatic missions ==
- Colombia has an embassy in Kingston, as well as a consulate in the same city.
- Jamaica has an embassy in Bogotá, as well as a consulate in San Andrés.

== See also ==
- Foreign relations of Colombia
- Foreign relations of Jamaica
