= Bajo Nuevo Bank =

Disputed reef in the Caribbean Sea

Disputed reef and islets
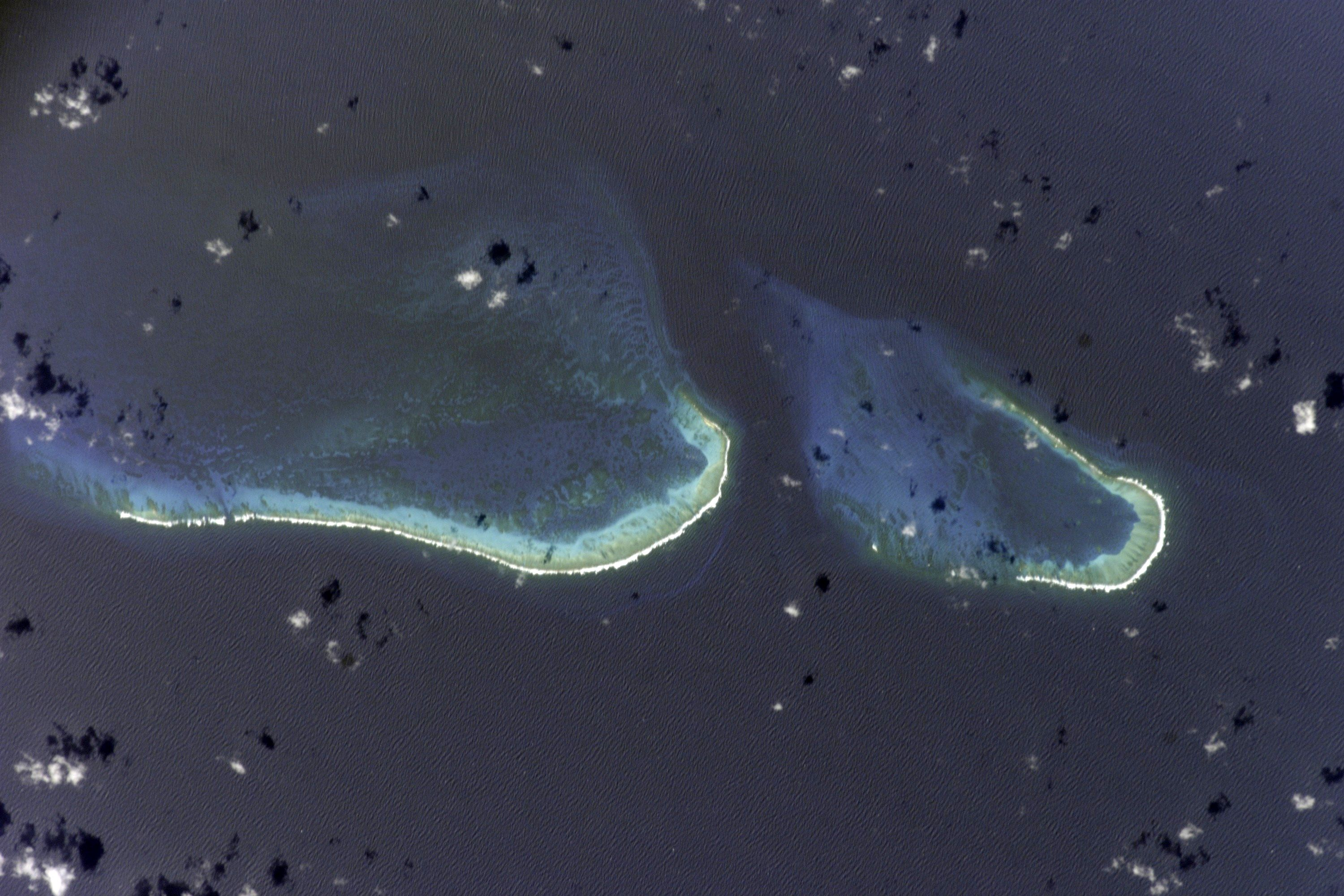
- Image of Bajo Nuevo from the ISS

- Location within the Caribbean Location within San Andrés y Providencia Location within Colombia
- Other name: Petrel Islands

Geography
- Location: Caribbean Sea
- Coordinates: 15°53′N 78°38′W
- Length: 26 km (16.2 mi)
- Width: 9 km (5.6 mi)
- Highest elevation: 2 m (7 ft)
- Highest point: Unnamed location on Low Cay

Administration
- Colombia
- Department: San Andrés and Providencia

Claimed by
- United States
- Territory: U.S. Minor Outlying Islands

Demographics
- Population: 0

Additional information
- Time zone: COT (UTC−05:00)

Bajo Nuevo Bank (Spanish: Bajo Nuevo), also known as the Petrel Islands (Spanish: Islas Petrel), is an uninhabited reef with some grass-covered islets in the western Caribbean Sea. The closest neighboring land feature is Serranilla Bank, located 110 kilometres (68 miles) to the west.

The reef is subject to a sovereignty dispute involving Colombia, Jamaica, and the United States. On 19 November 2012, regarding Nicaraguan claims to the islands, the International Court of Justice (ICJ) ruled that Colombia had sovereignty over both Bajo Nuevo and Serranilla Banks.

== Geography ==
Bajo Nuevo Bank is about 26 km (16 mi) long and 9 km (5.6 mi) wide. It has two atoll-like structures separated by a deep channel 1.4 km (0.87 mi) wide at its narrowest point. The larger southwestern reef complex measures 15.4 km (9.6 mi) northeast-southwest, and is up to 9.4 km (5.8 mi) wide, covering an area of about 100 km^{2} (39 sq mi). The reef partially dries on the southern and eastern sides. The smaller northeastern reef complex measures 10.5 km (6.5 mi) east-west and is up to 5.5 km (3.4 mi) wide, covering an area of 45 km^{2} (17 sq mi).

The most prominent cay is Low Cay, in the southwestern atoll. It is 300 m (330 yd) long and 40 m (44 yd) wide (about 1 ha or 2.5 acres), no more than 2 m (6.6 ft) high, and barren. It is composed of broken coral, driftwood, and sand. The light beacon on Low Cay is a 21 m (69 ft) metal tower, painted white with a red top. It emits a focal plane beam of light as two white flashes of light every 15 seconds. The beacon was erected in 1982, and reconstructed by the Colombian Ministry of National Defence in February 2008. It is currently maintained by the Colombian National Navy and overseen by the state's Maritime Authority.

== Territorial dispute ==
The Royal Decree of 20 November 1803 resolved that the Archipelago of San Andrés, as well as the part of Mosquitia between Cabo Gracias a Dios and the Chagres River, be separated from the Captaincy General of Guatemala and placed under the jurisdiction of the Viceroyalty of New Granada. With the advent of the independence struggles of the Hispanic American colonies, Colombia secured sovereignty over the islands when they subscribed to the Constitution of Cúcuta in June 1822.

Bajo Nuevo Bank is the subject of conflicting claims made by several sovereign states. In most cases, the dispute stems from attempts by a state to expand its exclusive economic zone over the surrounding seas.

Colombia claims the area as a part of the department of San Andrés and Providencia. Naval patrols in the area are carried out by the San Andrés fleet of the Colombian Navy. Colombia maintains that it has claimed these territories since 1886 as part of the geographic archipelago of San Andrés and Providencia. This date is disputed by other claimant states, who argue that Colombia had not claimed the territory by name until recently.

Jamaica's claim was largely considered to be resolved since entering into several bilateral agreements with Colombia. Between 1982 and 1986, the two states maintained a formal agreement which granted regulated fishing rights to Jamaican vessels within the territorial waters of Bajo Nuevo and nearby Serranilla Bank. Jamaica's signing of this treaty was regarded by critics as a de facto recognition of Colombian sovereignty over the two banks. However, the treaty is now extinguished, as Colombia declined to renew it upon its expiration in August 1986.

In November 1993, Colombia and Jamaica agreed upon a maritime delimitation treaty establishing the "Joint Regime Area" to cooperatively manage and exploit living and non-living resources in designated waters between the two aforementioned banks. However, the territorial waters immediately surrounding the cays themselves were excluded from the zone of joint-control, as Colombia considers these areas to be part of its coastal waters. The exclusion circles were defined in the chart attached to the treaty as "Colombia's territorial sea in Serranilla and Bajo Nuevo", even though the treaty mentioned the dispute over territorial waters. The agreement came into force in March 1994.

Nicaragua formerly claimed all the islands on its continental shelf, covering an area of over 50,000 km^{2} in the Caribbean Sea, including Bajo Nuevo Bank and all islands associated with the San Andrés and Providencia archipelagoes. It had persistently pursued this claim against Colombia in the International Court of Justice (ICJ), filing cases in both 2001 and 2007. The dispute originated in the debated validity and applicability of the Esguerra–Bárcenas treaty, exchanged with Colombia in March 1928. Nicaragua formally accepted the ICJ's 2012 ruling of Colombian sovereignty in a 2014 constitutional amendment.

The United States claim was made on 22 November 1869 by James W. Jennett under the provisions of the Guano Islands Act. Most claims made by the U.S. over the guano islands in this region were officially renounced in a treaty with Colombia dated September 1972. However, Bajo Nuevo Bank was not mentioned in the treaty, and Article 7 of the treaty states that matters not specifically mentioned in the treaty are not subject to its terms. The United States considers the bank an insular area.

Honduras, before its ratification of a maritime boundary treaty with Colombia on 20 December 1999, had previously also laid claim to Bajo Nuevo and nearby Serranilla Bank. Both states agreed upon a maritime demarcation in 1986 that excluded Honduras from any control over the banks or their surrounding waters. This bilateral treaty ensured that Honduras implicitly recognized Colombia's sovereignty over the disputed territories. Nicaragua disputed Honduras's legal right to hand over these areas before the ICJ.

== See also ==
- Alice Shoal
- List of Guano Island claims
- Rosalind Bank
