= Rosalind Bank =

Submerged atoll in the western Caribbean Sea

Disputed ocean bank
- Location within the Caribbean Location within San Andrés y Providencia Location within Colombia
- Other name: Placer de Rosalinda

Geography
- Location: Caribbean Sea
- Coordinates: 16°26′N 80°31′W

Administration
- Honduras

Rosalind Bank, also called Rosalinda or Rosa Linda Bank (Spanish: Placer de Rosalinda), is a large, completely submerged bank or atoll in the western Caribbean Sea. It is the culmination of an area of coral reef, some 300 kilometres (190 mi) long, that extends eastward from Cabo Gracias a Dios. The bank area is part of an extensive structure, known as Nicaragua Rise, that continues further east through Pedro Bank towards Jamaica.

== Geography ==
Rosalind is 101 kilometres (63 mi) long in a north–south direction and 56 kilometres (35 mi) wide, as defined by the 200 metres (660 ft) isobath, which corresponds to an area of roughly 4,500 square kilometres (1,700 sq mi). General depths range from 18 to 37 metres (59 to 121 ft), an almost immediate transition from the 300 metres (980 ft) depth of surrounding waters. The bottom is of coarse sand and coral.

Several patches of depths from 7.3 to 11 metres (24 to 36 ft) lie on a 23 kilometres (14 mi) long coral ledge located 3 kilometres (1.9 mi) within the southeast edge of the bank. A detached 11 metres (36 ft) patch lies near the southwest edge of the bank, 21.7 kilometres (13.5 mi) west of the southern end of this ledge. A depth of 10.9 metres (35 ft 9 in) lies close to the northern edge of the bank.

An extensive bank 66 kilometres (41 mi) long and 16 kilometres (9.9 mi) wide, with an area of 830 square kilometres (320 sq mi), lies 18 kilometres (11 mi) west of Rosalind Bank. Depths over this bank range from 7 to 66 metres (23 to 217 ft). The shallowest detached patches are found along the eastern edge of the bank. A detached 11 metres (36 ft) patch lies on the northern part of the bank. Six kilometres (3.7 mi) further west lies Thunder Knoll.

Thirty kilometres (19 mi) southeast of Rosalind Bank is Serranilla Bank. The cays on it are the closest pieces of dry land.

Until a 1986 treaty between Honduras and Colombia determined the two nations' maritime boundary in the area, Colombia claimed Rosalinda Bank as part of the San Andrés archipelago, along with Serranilla Bank. Under the treaty, however, Colombia accepted a boundary that placed Rosalind within Honduras's exclusive economic zone. Nicaragua objected to the 1986 maritime decision as it ignored Nicaraguan claims to the area.

== See also ==
- Placer (geography)
