= Islote Sucre =

Island in the department of San Andrés, Providencia and Santa Catalina, Colombia

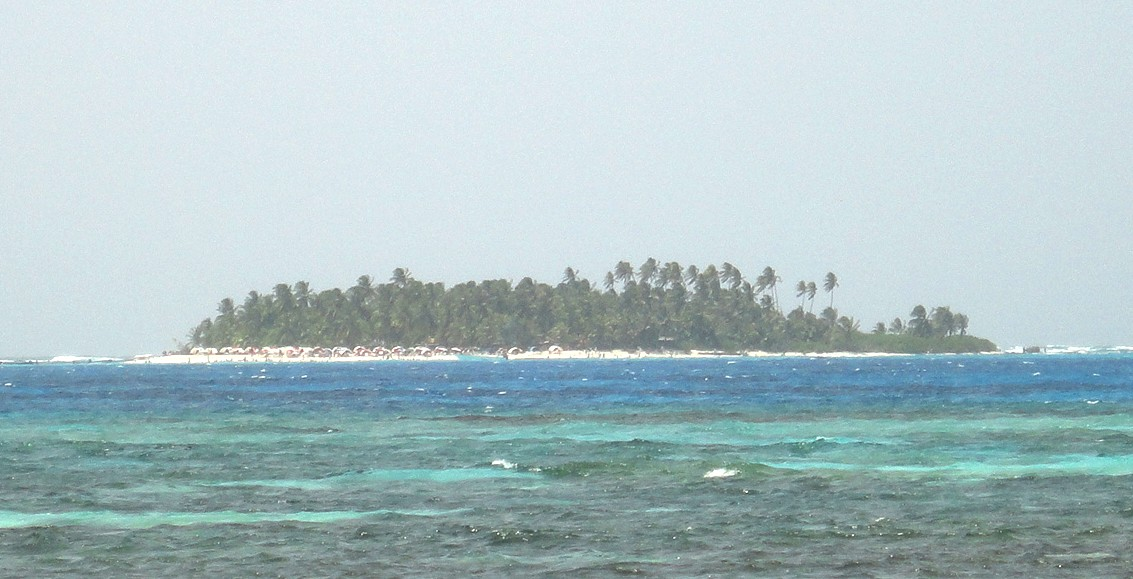
- View of Islote Sucre (Johnny Cay)
- Interactive map of Islote Sucre

Geography
- Location: Caribbean Sea
- Coordinates: 12°36′00″N 81°41′23″W
- Area: 4.9 ha (12 acres)

Administration
- Colombia
- Department: Archipelago of San Andrés, Providencia and Santa Catalina

Demographics
- Population: 451

Additional information
- Time zone: UTC−05:00

Islote Sucre, also known as Johnny Cay, is a small island in the Caribbean Sea belonging to the Colombian department of Archipelago of San Andrés, Providencia and Santa Catalina.

== Description ==
Islote Sucre is located approximately 1.5 km north of the island of San Andrés, the largest in the archipelago. It has a total area of 49,411 m^{2} (4.94 hectares), making it the largest of the cays that surround San Andrés.

The climate is stable all year round, hovering around 27º C, but there are cool breezes throughout the year. There are coconut trees and white sand beaches. Islote Sucre can be reached by sea using boats that depart from neighboring San Andrés and tourism is the main economic activity.

== See also ==
- Caribbean Region, Colombia
- San Andrés (island)
