= San Andrés and Providencia =

Colombian island group in the Caribbean

San Andrés and Providencia San Andrés y Providencia
- Department
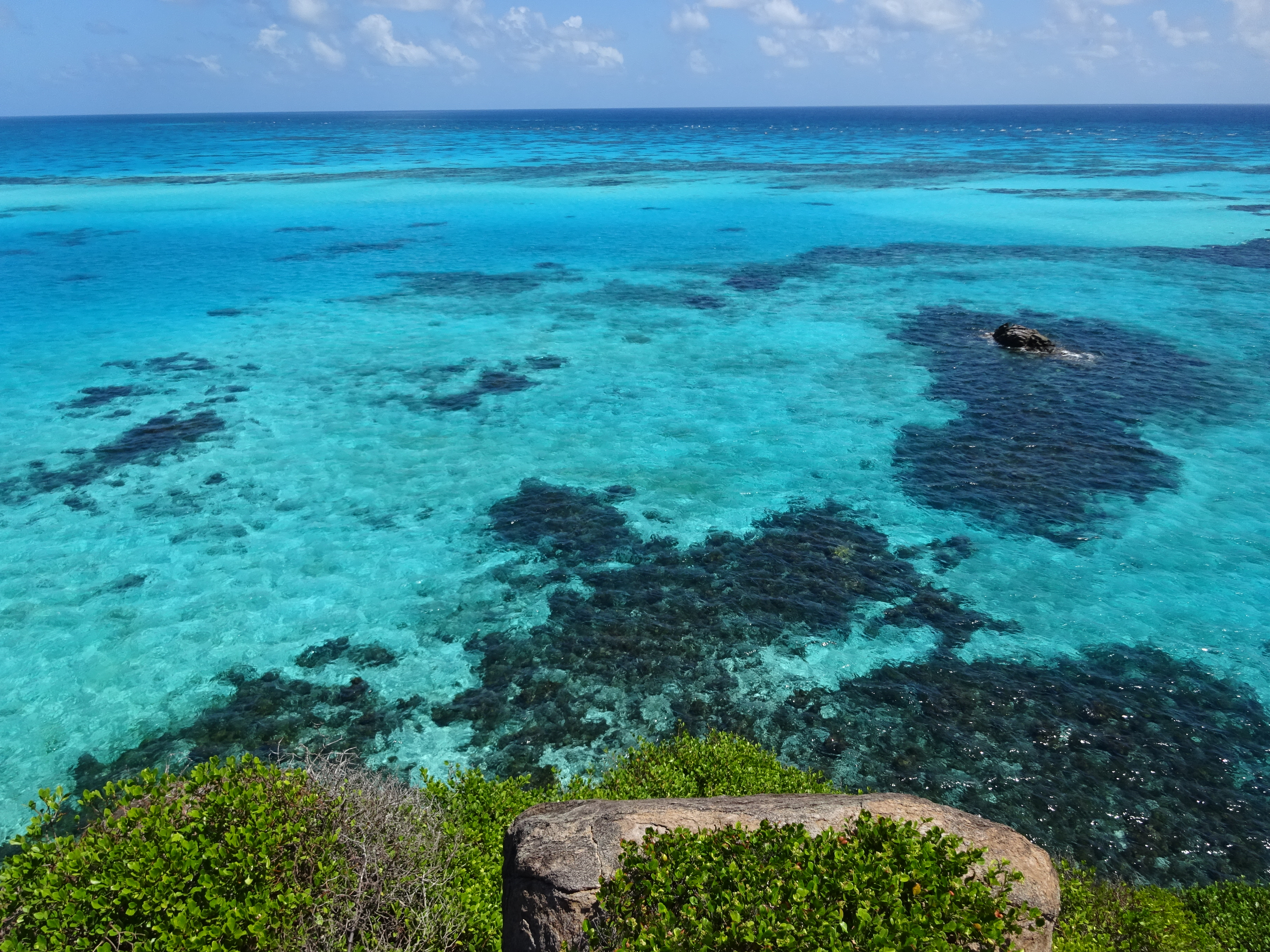
- Sea of Providencia Island, Colombia

- Flag Coat of arms
- Motto: Paraíso Turístico; Tourist Paradise
- Anthem: Himno de San Andrés y Providencia
- San Andrés and Providencia shown in the Caribbean map

- Topography of the archipelago
- Coordinates: 12°33′N 81°43′W
- Country: Colombia
- Region: Insular Region
- Established: 4 July 1991
- Capital: North End (San Andrés City)

Government
  - Governor: Everth Hawkins Sjogreen (2019–present) (El Movimiento Amplio por el Progreso del Archipiélago)

Area
  - Total: 52.5 km^{2} (20.3 sq mi)
  - Rank: 33rd

Population (2018)
  - Total: 61,280
  - Rank: 29th
  - Density: 1,170/km^{2} (3,020/sq mi)

GDP
  - Total: COP 2,125 billion (US$ 0.5 billion)
- Time zone: UTC−05:00
- ISO 3166 code: CO-SAP
- HDI: 0.811 very high · 3rd of 33
- Website: SanAndres.gov.co

San Andrés and Providencia (Spanish: San Andrés y Providencia, pronounced [aɾtʃiˈpjelaɣo ðe ˌsan anˈdɾes pɾoβiˈðensja i ˌsanta kataˈlina]) is one of the departments of Colombia. It consists of two island groups in the Caribbean Sea about 775 km (418 nmi; 482 mi) northwest of mainland Colombia, and eight outlying banks and reefs. The largest island of the archipelago and Colombia is called San Andrés and its capital is San Andrés. The other large islands are Providencia and Santa Catalina Islands which lie to the north-east of San Andrés; their capital is Santa Isabel.

== Name ==
The name is sometimes abbreviated to "Archip. de San Andres". The official website abbreviates it as San Andrés ("Gobernación de San Andrés"). ISO 3166-2:CO lists it as "San Andrés, Providencia y Santa Catalina". Statoids lists it as "San Andrés y Providencia".

== History ==
Spain formally claimed the archipelago of San Andres and Providencia in 1510, a few years after the voyages of Christopher Columbus. In 1544, the territory was placed under the administration of the Captaincy General of Guatemala. During the early years, Spain concentrated on exploring and colonizing the mainland and hardly settled the islands.

In 1630, English Puritans arrived in Providence Island, under the aegis of the Providence Island Company. The Puritans decided to settle the tropical islands, rather than cold, rocky New England, but the Providence Island colony did not succeed in the same way as the Massachusetts Bay Colony. They established slave-worked plantations and engaged in privateering, which led to the Spanish and Portuguese conquering the colony in May, 1641. In 1670, English buccaneers, led by Henry Morgan, took over the islands, which he used as a base to attack Panama. The buccaneers abandoned the islands by 1672. There is no record of anyone inhabiting the islands from then for another century.

In 1775, Lieutenant Tomás O'Neil, a Spaniard of Irish descent, was given military command of the islands and, in 1790, was named governor. He requested the transfer of the islands to the military jurisdiction of the Viceroyalty of New Granada, which was granted in 1803. That year, Spain assigned the islands, together with south-eastern part of the Mosquito Shore, from Cape Gracias a Dios to the Chagres River, to the Viceroyalty of New Granada. The territory was administered from the province of Cartagena. Soon, trade links with Cartagena were greater than those with Guatemala.

On 4 July 1818, a French corsair, Louis-Michel Aury, with 400 men and 14 ships flying the Argentine flag, captured Old Providence and St. Catherine islands. The island was populated by white English-speaking Protestants and their slaves. Aury and his team used the islands as their new base from which to pursue Central American independence. However, his efforts to also support Bolivar in his fight for Venezuelan and Colombian independence were repeatedly turned down.

After the Spanish colonies became independent, the inhabitants of San Andrés, Providence and St. Catherine voluntarily adhered to the Republic of Gran Colombia in 1822, which placed them under the administration of the Magdalena Department. The First Mexican Empire, which was succeeded by the United Provinces of Central America (UPCA), also claimed the islands. Gran Colombia, in turn, protested the UPCA's occupation of the south-eastern coast of the Mosquito Shore. The UPCA broke up in 1838 to 1840, but Nicaragua carried on the dispute, as did Gran Colombia's successors: New Granada and Colombia. A local administration (intendencia) was established in the islands in 1912 by Colombia.

In 1928, Colombia and Nicaragua signed the Esguerra-Bárcenas Treaty, which gave control of the islands to Colombia. However, when the Sandinista government assumed power in the 1980s, Nicaragua repudiated the treaty. Colombia argues that the treaty's final ratification in 1930 (when the US forces were already on their way out) confirms its validity. Colombia and Honduras signed a maritime boundary treaty in 1999, which implicitly accepts Colombian sovereignty over the islands.

In 2001, Nicaragua filed claims with the International Court of Justice (ICJ) over the disputed maritime boundary and claimed 50,000 km^{2} (19,305 sq mi) in the Caribbean, including the San Andrés and Providencia Archipelagos. Colombia responded that the court has no jurisdiction over the matter and increased its naval and police presence in the islands. Colombia also defended its claim in the ICJ. On 13 December 2007, the ICJ ruled that the islands were Colombian territory but left the maritime border dispute unresolved. On 19 November 2012, the ICJ upheld that Colombia had sovereignty over the islands.

=== United States claims ===
In the 19th century, the United States claimed several uninhabited locations in the area under the Guano Island Act, including several now claimed by Colombia. In 1981, the US ceded its claims to Serrana Bank and Roncador Bank to Colombia and abandoned its claim to Quita Sueño Bank. The US still maintains claims over Serranilla Bank and Bajo Nuevo Bank and considers them both to be unincorporated territories of the United States.

=== Declaration of self-determination ===
In 1903, the local Raizal population rejected an offer from the US to separate from Colombia in the wake of Panama's secession from Colombia. However, the island's native population soon changed its mind when the policies of successive Colombian governments tried consistently to modify the majority Raizal and British ethnic composition of the Islands by the extensive migration of Spanish-speaking mainland Colombians. The efforts at assimilation and immigration were led largely by Catholic missionaries, which angered the Protestant native population.

== Local government and representation ==
=== 2007 elections ===
A member of the departmental assembly for 15 years, Pedro Gallardo Forbes, of the Regional Integration Movement (MIR), won the 28 October 2007 gubernatorial election, with support from the Colombian Conservative Party and the Radical Change party. He succeeded a governor from the Colombian Liberal Party. He got 8,187 votes (38.93%), Aury Guerrero Bowie (Liberal Party, with support from the Democratic Colombia Party) 8,160 votes (38.8%), and Jack Housni Jaller (Social National Unity Party) 4,063 votes (19.3%). Only 21,991 out of 41,197 potential electors voted in the gubernatorial election.

At the departmental assembly, elected the same day, the 9 seats were distributed among 6 parties: three Liberals (Arlington Howard, Qwincy Bowie Gordon, and Leroy Carol Bent Archbold), two MIR (Jorge Méndez and Freddy Herazo) two Democratic Colombia Party (former MP María Teresa Uribe Bent and former Interior Secretary Rafael Gómez Redondo), two SNUP (Fernando Cañon Florez and María Said Darwich), one Radical Change (Heber Esquivel Benitez), and one Conservative (Julio César Gallardo Martínez).

The new mayor of Providence, Janeth Archbold (Team Colombia party), a political ally of the new governor, was elected with 1,013 votes against Liberal Mark Taylor (515 votes), SNUP Arturo Robinson (514 votes) and Conservative Peter Bent.

== Geography ==
Besides the San Andrés and Providencia island groups, there are eight atolls that belong to the department, including submerged Alice Shoal.

=== Island of San Andrés ===
==== San Andrés Island ====
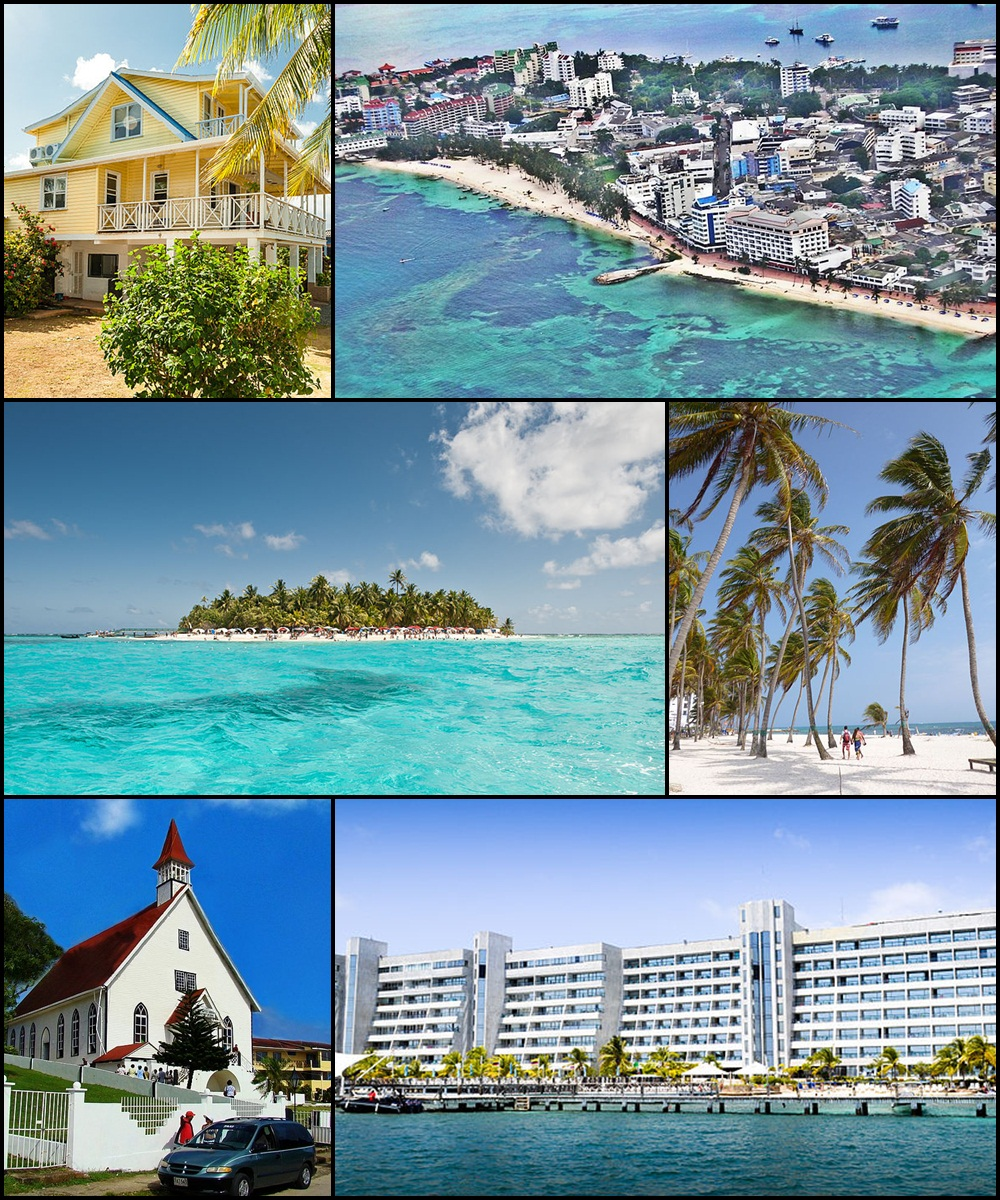
San Andrés Island montage

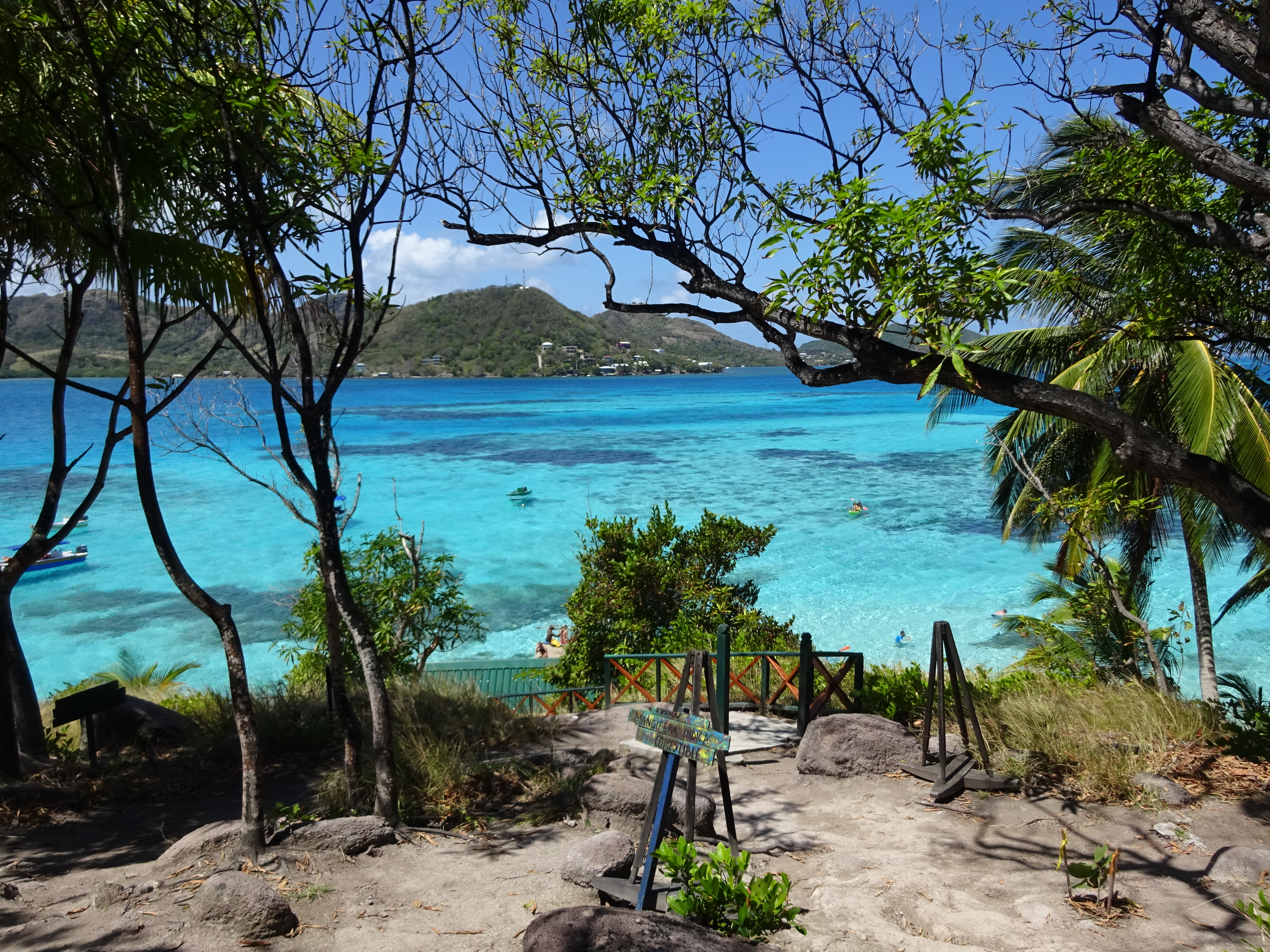
Cangrejo Cay, 13°22′34″N 81°20′52″W

This is the main island of the San Andrés group, and the largest of the department. It is located at 12°33′N 81°43′W. It measures 12 km (7.5 mi) in length with a width of 3 km (1.9 mi) and covers an area of 26 km^{2} (10 sq mi). There is a tiny lagoon in the centre of the island called Big Pond. The principal town is San Andrés in the north of the island. Another town is San Luis on the east coast. Cayo Johnny (Johnny Caye) lies 1.5 km (0.9 mi) ENE of German Point (Punta Norte), the island's northern tip, and Haynes Cay about the same distance east of the island. Cotton Cay is less than 1 km (0.6 mi) south of San Andrés town, on the northeastern coast.

==== Cayos de Albuquerque (Cayos de S.W., Southwest Cays) ====
This atoll is southwest of San Andrés at 12°10′N 81°51′W. It is the westernmost point of Colombia. The reef is about 7 km (4.5 mi) across. In the southern part are Cayo del Norte and Cayo del Sur. Cayo del Norte, the larger of the two, is up to 2 m (7 ft) high and overgrown with palm trees and bushes. Cayo del Sur, a few hundred metres further South, reaches a height of a little more than 1 m (3 ft) and is vegetated with a few bushes, and in the South with mangroves. There is a lighthouse on Cayo del Norte, at 12°10′N 81°50′W, operating since 1980. It is maintained by the Colombian Navy.

==== Cayos del Este Sudeste (Courtown Cays, Cayos de E.S.E.) ====
Cities of San Andrés and Providencia

This atoll is 22 km (14 mi) east-south-east of San Andrés Island and 35 km (22 mi) northeast of Cayos de Alburquerque, at 12°24′N 81°28′W. It is 14 km (8.7 mi) long and 4 km (2.5 mi) wide. There are a few sand cays in the southeast. The largest ones are Cayo del Este, Cayo Bolivar, West Cay, and Cayo Arena, none of which are higher than 2 metres (7 ft). All cays are overgrown with palm trees and bushes, and surrounded by mangroves. There is a Colombian Navy lighthouse on Cayo Bolivar. The cays are regularly visited by fishermen from the Colombian mainland and San Andrés. There are two concrete buildings on Cayo Bolivar, and a few wooden huts on the other cays.

==== Banks and shoals ====
Colombia claims sovereignty over six additional outlying banks and shoals: Alice Shoal, Bajo Nuevo Bank, Serranilla Bank, Quita Sueño Bank, Serrana Bank, and Roncador Bank.

== Demographics ==
Historical population
Year	Pop.	±%
1973	22,983	—
1985	35,818	+55.8%
1993	61,040	+70.4%
2005	70,554	+15.6%
2018	61,280	−13.1%

The Departamento de San Andrés, Providencia y Santa Catalina covers a land area of 44 km^{2} (17 sq mi). The latest official population estimate for 2018 is 61,280.

Before 1960, the population of the islands was almost entirely Raizals, who are an Afro-Caribbean group, Protestant in religion, speaking San Andrés–Providencia Creole. There is a minority of white English-speaking Protestants of British descent. Colombia has promoted the migration of Spanish-speaking mainlanders, with Catholic missions participating since 1947. This policy seems to be an answer to growing discontent within the Raizal community that could strengthen separatist movements; a Raizal majority would in this case win a pro-independence referendum but this could be neutralized by outnumbering them with mainland Colombians.

By 2005, Raizals were only 30% of the 60,000 or more inhabitants of the islands, with the rest being mainland Colombians and English-speaking whites of British descent. Most Raizals are multilingual and can speak Spanish, Creole, and English.

== Transportation ==
=== Airports ===
Gustavo Rojas Pinilla International Airport (IATA: ADZ) serves the towns of San Andrés and San Luis, but also commercially serves the nearby island of Providencia Island through feeder flights from El Embrujo Airport. Gustavo Rojas Pinilla International Airport was initially called Sesquicentenario International Airport. It is the 6th busiest airport in Colombia, handling 836,234 passengers in 2006. Most of these passengers come from the continental part of the country, due to poor international direct service to the island. Many international tourists have to fly to one of Colombia's largest airports to be able to reach the islands. Copa Airlines maintains a passenger service between San Andrés and Panama City. In 2021, American Airlines began serving San Andrés nonstop from Miami. In recent years, San Andrés has also received seasonal charter flights, mainly from Canada and a few Central American countries.

The airport is one of Colombia's fastest growing airports with a 13.4% increase in the number of passengers between 2005 and 2006.

== See also ==
- List of Caribbean islands#San Andrés, Providencia and Santa Catalina

== Sources ==
- Diemer, Christian; Šeparović, Amalija (2006). "Territorial Questions and Maritime Delimitation with Regard to Nicaragua's Claims to the San Andrés Archipelago". Heidelberg Journal of International Law. 66: 167–186. ISSN 0044-2348.
