= Thunder Knoll =

Reef knoll in the Caribbean Sea

- Location within the Caribbean Location within San Andrés y Providencia Location within Colombia
- Other name: Placer de Thunder Knoll

Geography
- Location: Caribbean Sea
- Coordinates: 16°27′N 80°20′W

Administration
- Honduras

Thunder Knoll 16°27′N 80°20′W is a reef knoll about 18 km in extent and composed of coral sand. It lies approximately 6 km west of the north part of Rosalind Bank. Depths over this bank range from 11 to 27 m.
