= Serranilla Bank =

Disputed reef in the Caribbean Sea

Disputed reef and islets
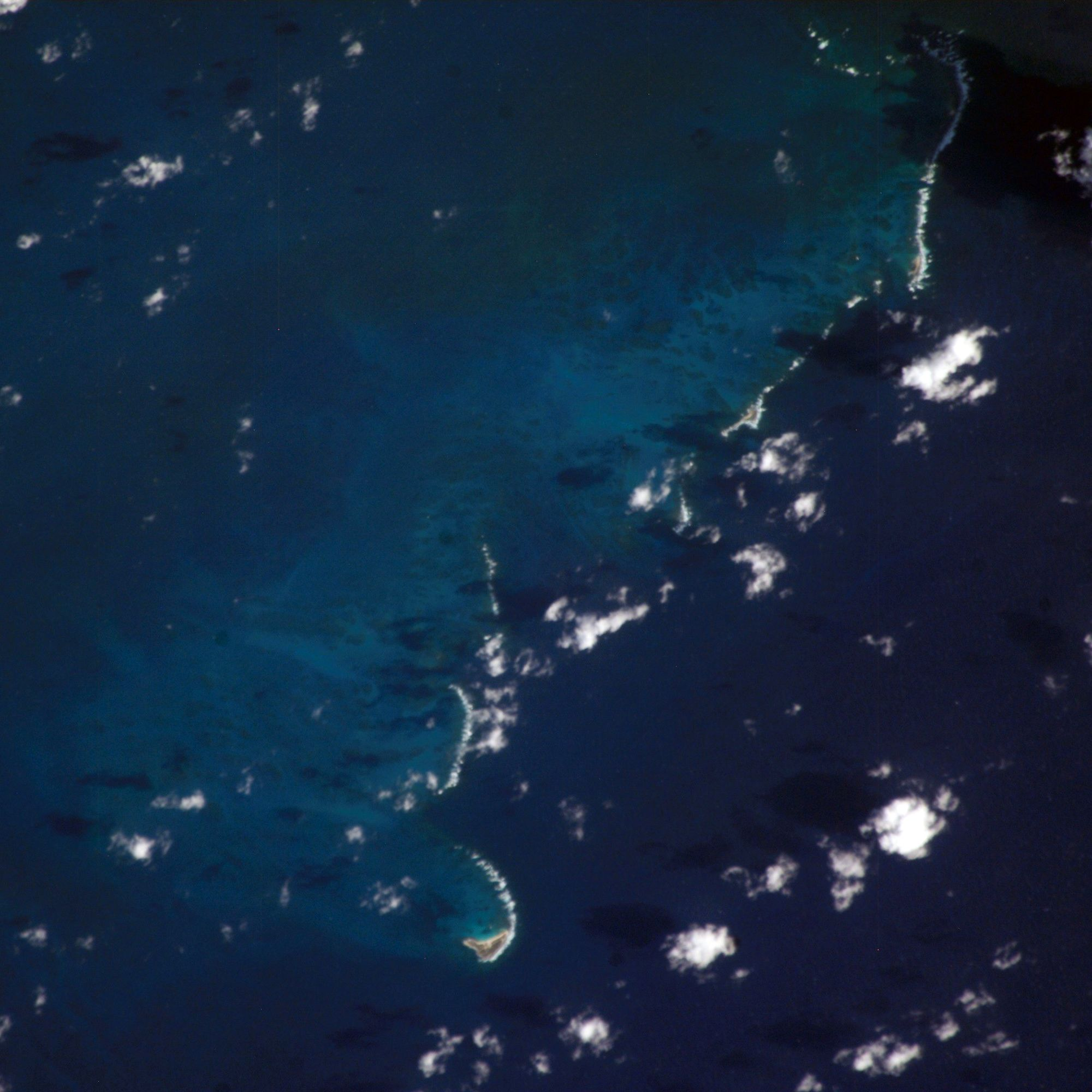
- Satellite image of Serranilla Bank

- Location within the Caribbean Location within San Andrés y Providencia Location within Colombia

Geography
- Location: Caribbean Sea
- Coordinates: 15°50′N 79°50′W
- Total islands: 4
- Major islands: Beacon Cay

Administration
- Colombia
- Department: San Andrés and Providencia

Claimed by
- Jamaica
- United States
- Territory: U.S. Minor Outlying Islands

Demographics
- Population: 0

Additional information
- Time zone: COT (UTC−05:00)

Serranilla Bank (Spanish: Isla Serranilla, Banco Serranilla and Placer de la Serranilla) is a partially submerged reef, with small uninhabited islets, in the western Caribbean Sea. It is situated about 350 kilometres (220 mi) northeast of the Punta Gorda River, Nicaragua, and roughly 280 kilometres (170 mi) southwest of Jamaica. The closest neighbouring land feature is Bajo Nuevo Bank, located 110 kilometres (68 mi) to the east.

Serranilla Bank was first shown on Spanish maps in 1510. It is administered by Colombia as a part of the department of San Andrés and Providencia. The reef is subject to a sovereignty dispute involving Colombia, Jamaica, and the United States. A previous claim by Honduras was resolved in favor of Colombia when the two countries approved a treaty establishing their maritime boundaries. Jamaica's claim was largely considered to be resolved when it established a "Joint Regime Area" with overlapping maritime boundaries in 1993, acknowledging Colombian control of Bajo Nuevo Bank and Serranilla Bank, even though the treaty mentioned the dispute over territorial waters. On 19 November 2012, in regards to Nicaraguan claims to the islands, the International Court of Justice (ICJ) upheld Colombia's sovereignty over the bank. However, the judgment does not analyze or mention the U.S. claim over the reef.

== Geography ==
Serranilla Bank is a former atoll, now a mostly submerged carbonate platform consisting of shallow reef environments. It is about 40 kilometres (25 mi) in length and 32 kilometres (20 mi) in width, covering an area of over 1,200 square kilometres (460 sq mi), almost entirely under water. Three small cays and two rocks emerge above the water to form the bank's islands. These are West Breaker, Middle Cay, East Cay, Beacon Cay, and Northeast Breaker. They are largely barren, with sparse vegetation of bushes and some trees. Many shipwrecks are located in its vicinity. The bank lacks coral reefs and has minimal sediment cover. Accretion of the bank is not keeping up with the rise in sea level. The south-eastern portion is covered mainly by hardgrounds, while the rest of the bank is mostly covered by thin Halimeda sediments.

Beacon Cay is the largest islet in the Bank. It is overbuilt with small military facilities, which house a small rotating garrison of Colombian naval personnel. There is a lighthouse on a coral ledge in the southwest approach to the bank. It is a 33-metre (108 ft) tall skeletal tower built atop a 3-storey crew residence. The lamp emits a focal plane beam of light as two white flashes every 20 seconds. The current lighthouse was first erected in 1982, and was reconstructed in May 2008 by the Colombian Ministry of National Defense. It is currently maintained by the Colombian National Navy and overseen by the state's Maritime Authority.

== History ==
The Serranilla Bank was first identified by the Spanish name Placer de la Serranilla (English: "Shoal of [the] Serranilla" or "Serranilla Shoal"; serranilla literally translating to "little mountain range", "small range of mountains", "little highlands", or "little sierra"), likely having first been spotted, and possibly mapped, by Spanish navigators in the first decade of the 16th century. While the bank was later claimed to have appeared in Spanish nautical charts as early as 1510, this is now considered a misdate and a historical misattribution; the bank makes its earliest definitive appearance in 1529 under the name Placer de Serranilla in the map of the Americas prepared by Spanish royal cartographer Diogo Ribeiro.

Serranilla, in the context of the landform, may also be translated "Little Serrana", Serranilla neighboring the larger Serrana Bank (Isla Serrana; originally called La Serranna, and later also referred to as Banco Serranna ("Serranna Bank") and Bajío Serranna ("Serrana Shallows", "Serrana Lowland[s]", or "Serrana Shoal")) by roughly 175 kilometers (about 109 miles) to the northeast.

Centuries after the production of Ribeiro's map, in May or June of 1820, French corsaire captain Louis-Michel Aury and his crew became shipwrecked on the bank and, subsequent to their rescue and return to a base on Old Providence Island, Aury mentioned the bank in a naval log or report, as well as a territorial petition.

The Royal Decree of November 20, 1803, issued by King Charles IV of Spain, resolved that the Archipelago of San Andrés, as well as the part of Mosquitia between Cabo Gracias a Dios and the Chagres River, be separated from the Captaincy General of Guatemala and placed under the jurisdiction of the Viceroyalty of New Granada. With the advent of the independence struggles of the Hispanic American colonies, Colombia secured sovereignty over the islands when they subscribed to the Constitution of Cúcuta in June 1822. In later history, it has been the subject of conflicting claims by several sovereign states; in most cases, the dispute stems from attempts by a state to expand its exclusive economic zone over the surrounding seas.

Between 1982 and 1986, Colombia maintained a formal agreement with Jamaica, which granted regulated fishing rights to Jamaican vessels within the territorial waters of Serranilla Bank and the nearby Bajo Nuevo Bank. In November 1993, the two states agreed upon a maritime delimitation treaty establishing a "Joint Regime Area" to cooperatively manage and exploit living and non-living resources in designated waters between the two banks. However, the territorial waters immediately surrounding the cays themselves were excluded from the zone of joint-control, as Colombia considers these areas to be parts of its coastal waters. The agreement came into force in March 1994.

Nicaragua formerly claimed all the islands on its continental shelf, covering an area of over 50,000 km^{2} in the Caribbean Sea, including the Serranilla Bank and all islands associated with the San Andrés and Providencia archipelagoes. It had persistently pursued this claim against Colombia in the International Court of Justice (ICJ), filing cases in both 2001 and 2007. Nicaragua formally accepted the ICJ's 2012 ruling of Colombian sovereignty in a 2014 constitutional amendment.

The United States' claim was made in 1879 and 1880 under the Guano Islands Act by James W. Jennett. Most claims made by the U.S. over the guano islands in this region were officially renounced in a treaty with Colombia dated September 1972. But whether or not Serranilla Bank was included in the agreement is disputed. There is no specific mention of the feature in the treaty, and as per Article 7 of the treaty, only matters specifically mentioned in the document are subject to it. The U.S. considers the reef an insular area.

Honduras claimed Serranilla Bank as part of its national territory in Article 10 of its Constitution. In 1986, it agreed upon a maritime boundary demarcation with Colombia that excluded Honduras of any control over the bank or its surrounding waters. The ratification of this boundary on 20 December 1999 proved to be controversial within Honduras, as it ensured that the state implicitly recognized Colombia's sovereignty over the claimed territory. At that time, Nicaragua disputed Honduras' legal right to hand over these areas before the ICJ. Despite the agreement with Colombia, the Honduran government has not officially renounced the claim in the Constitution.

== Notable fauna ==
In 1952, Serranilla Bank was the site of the last sighting of the now-extinct Caribbean monk seal.

== See also ==
- Alice Shoal
- List of Guano Island claims
- Rosalind Bank
