= Serrana Bank =

Colombian atoll in the Caribbean Sea

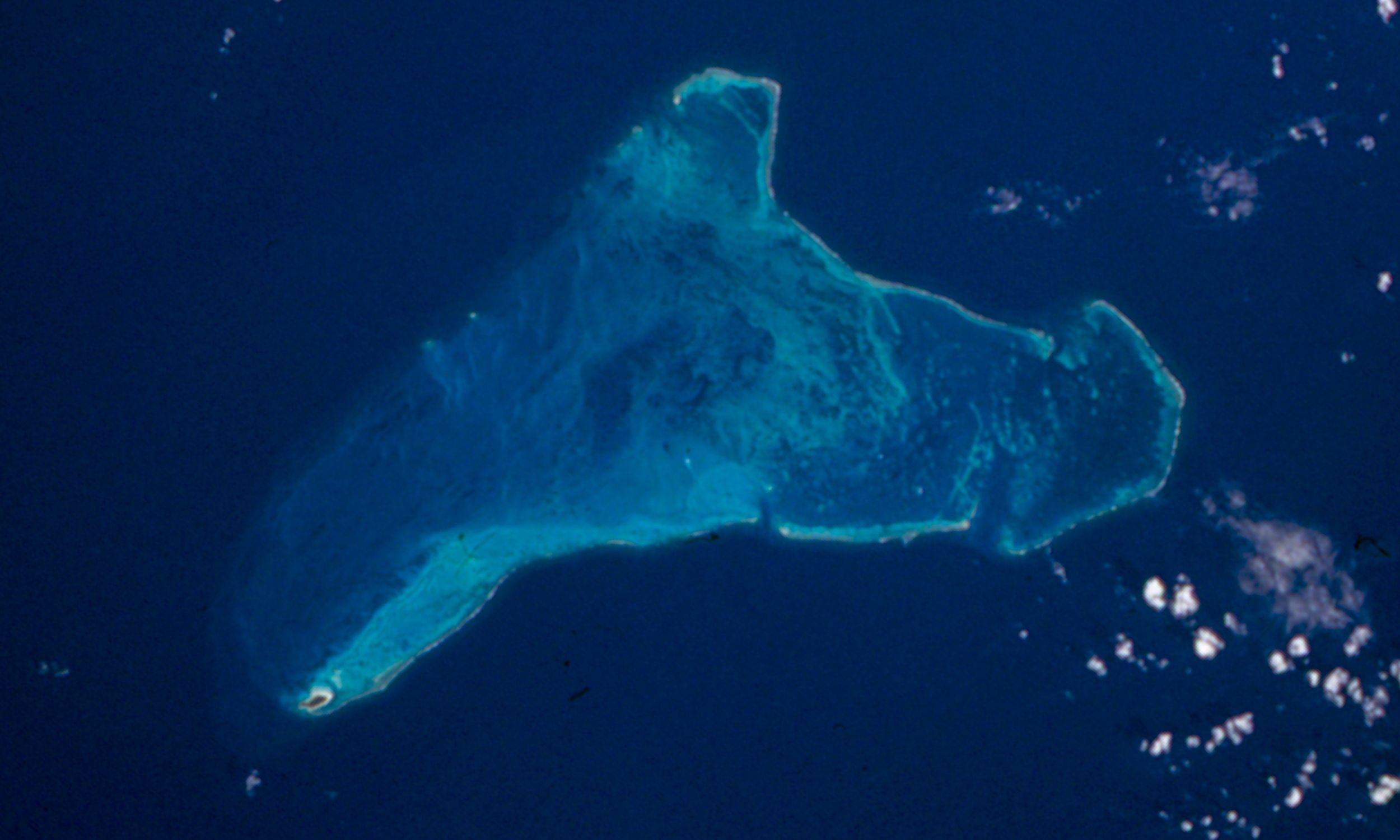
- Serrana Bank

- Location within Colombia Location within the Caribbean

Geography
- Location: Caribbean Sea
- Coordinates: 14°20′N 80°20′W

Administration
- Colombia

Demographics
- Population: 58 (2010)

Serrana Bank is a Colombian-administered atoll in the western Caribbean Sea. It is a mostly underwater reef about 50 km (31 mi) long and 13 km (8.1 mi) wide with six cays, or islets, the largest of which is Southwest Cay.

== Geography ==
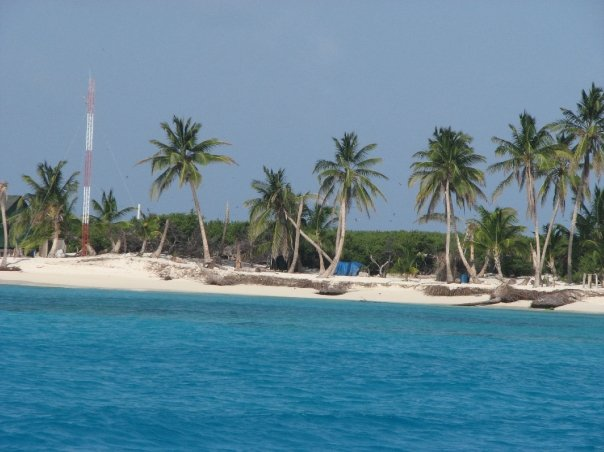
South Cay of Serrana Bank.

The cays from south to north are:

- Southwest Cay (500 by 200 meters)
- South Cay (150 by 25 m (492 by 82 ft))
- Little Cay (less than 100 m (330 ft) in diameter)
- East Cay (80 by 40 m (260 by 130 ft))
- Narrow Cay
- North Cay

== History ==
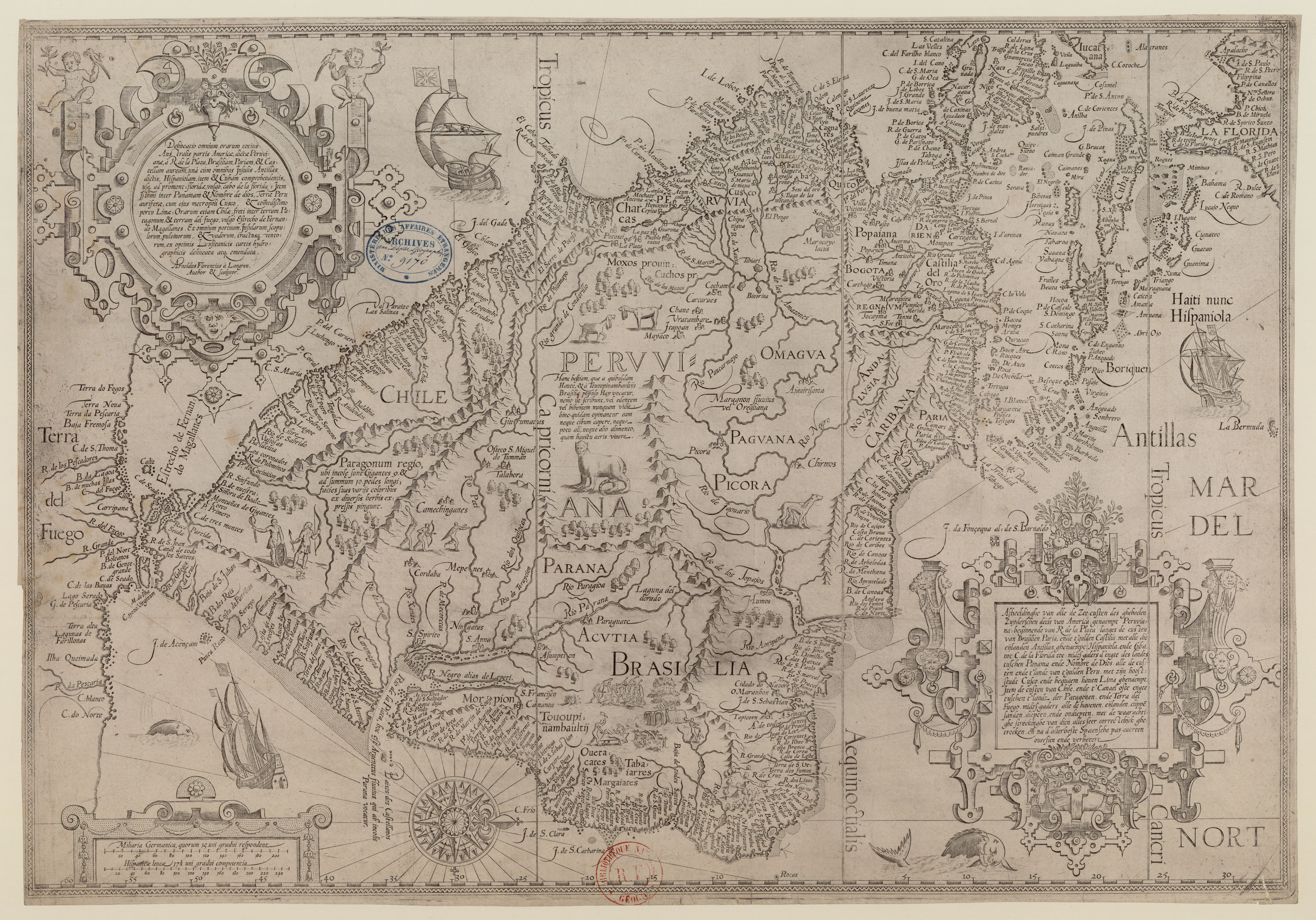
Partial map of America by Arnold Florent Van Langren (1596), showing Serrana Bank.

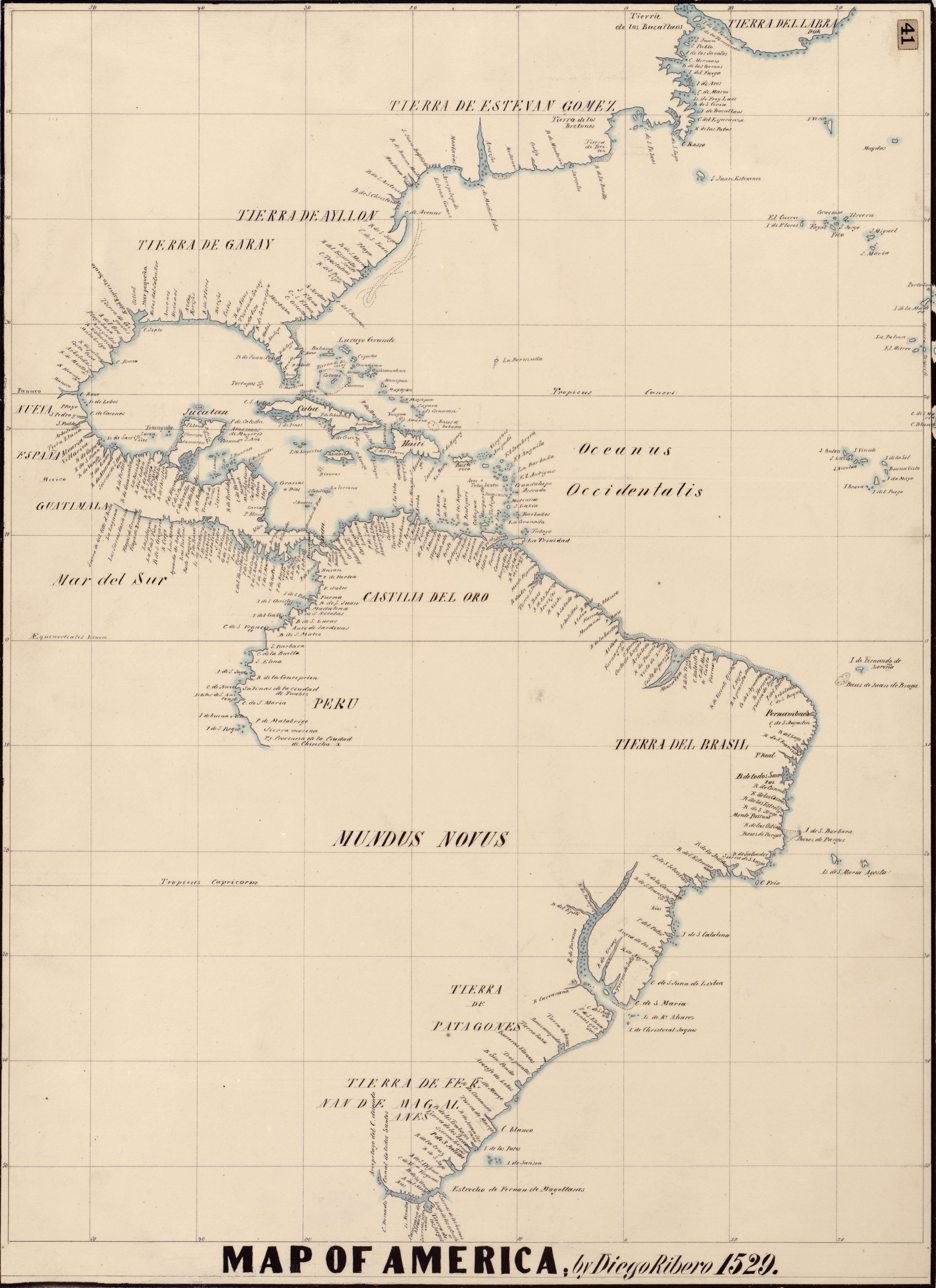
Map of America by Diogo Ribeiro (1529), showing Serrana Bank.

Serrana Bank takes its name in honor of the Spanish castaway Pedro Serrano, who lived there from 1525 until he was rescued in 1532, an adventure that inspired the novel Robinson Crusoe by Daniel Defoe. The Royal Decree of November 20, 1803 resolved that the Archipelago of San Andrés, as well as the part of Mosquitia between Cabo Gracias a Dios and the Chagres River, be separated from the Captaincy General of Guatemala and placed under the jurisdiction of the Viceroyalty of New Granada. With the advent of the independence struggles of the Hispanic American colonies, Colombia secured sovereignty over the islands when they subscribed to the Constitution of Cúcuta in June 1822. In later history, it has been the subject of conflicting claims by several sovereign states; in most cases, the dispute stems from attempts by a state to expand its exclusive economic zone over the surrounding seas.

On September 8, 1972, Colombia and the United States signed a treaty recognizing Colombia's sovereignty over Roncador Cay and Serrana Bank and abandoning American claims over Quita Sueño Bank. The United States retained a fishing concession over the three banks. This treaty became effective on September 17, 1981. On November 19, 2012, regarding Nicaraguan claims to the islands, the International Court of Justice (ICJ) reaffirmed Colombia's sovereignty.

However, in the same judgment the Court drew the maritime boundary so that Serrana was enclaved, with a 12-nautical-mile territorial sea surrounded by waters allocated to Nicaragua. Nicaragua later brought a further case seeking a continental shelf extending beyond 200 nautical miles from its coast. In its judgment of 13 July 2023, the ICJ rejected all of Nicaragua's submissions. It held that under customary international law, a state's continental shelf beyond 200 nautical miles from its baselines may not extend within 200 nautical miles of another state's baselines.

On September 3, 2007, the eye of Category 5 Hurricane Felix passed over Serrana Bank.

== See also ==
- List of Guano Island claims
