= Roncador Cay =

- Location within Colombia Location within the Caribbean

Geography
- Location: Caribbean Sea
- Coordinates: 13°32′N 80°03′W

Administration
- Colombia

Roncador Cay is a small island of the Roncador Bank, located in the west Caribbean Sea, off the coast of Central America, 150 kilometres (93 miles) east-northeast of Providencia Island.

== History ==
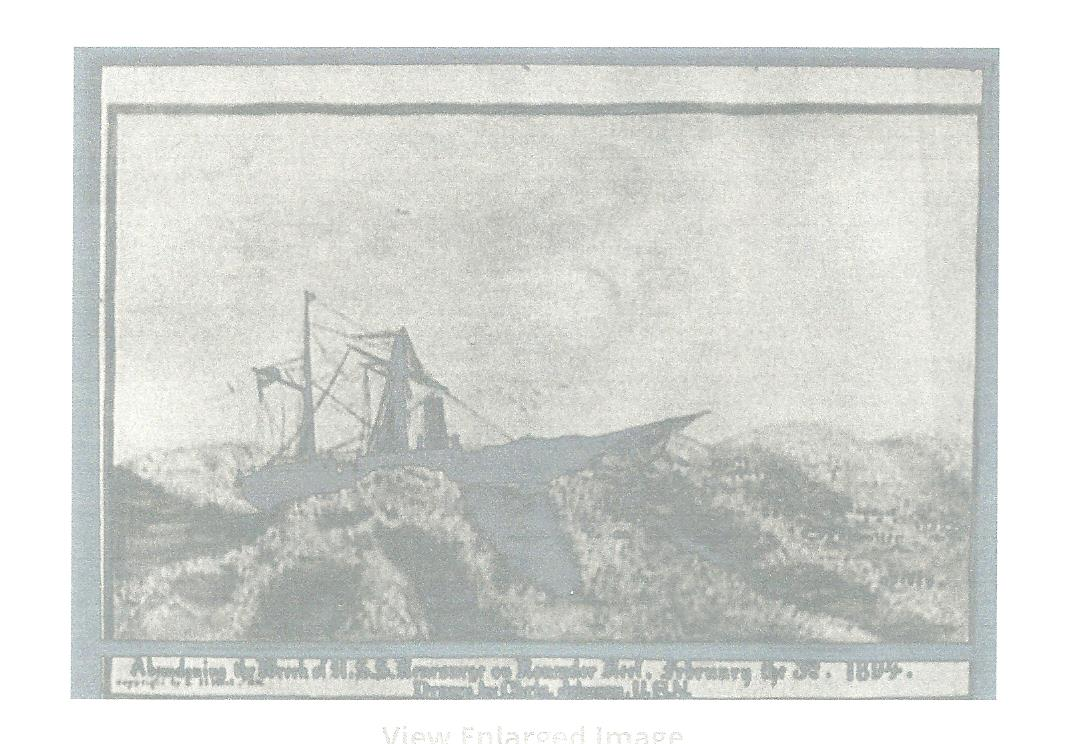
Abandoning the wreck of the U.S.S. Kearsarge on Roncador Reef, February 3rd, 1894

On 2 February 1894, 3 days after departing Haiti, the USS Kearsarge struck the reef and sank. Her officers and crew safely made it to shore. US Congress appropriated $45,000 to return the ship, but her wreck was deemed beyond repair by the Boston Towboat Company and left on the reef.

Both Colombia and the United States have claimed Roncador cay.

!n treaty No. 21801 UNITED STATES OF AMERICA and COLOMBIA, the United States ceded land rights to Quita Sueno, Roncador and Serrana Cays. The United States retained the right of free passage and use of these waters, for its nationals and vessels.

"There shall be no interference by either Government or by its nationals or vessels with the fishing activities of nationals and vessels of the other in this area."
