= Quita Sueño Bank =

Colombian reef formation in Caribbean

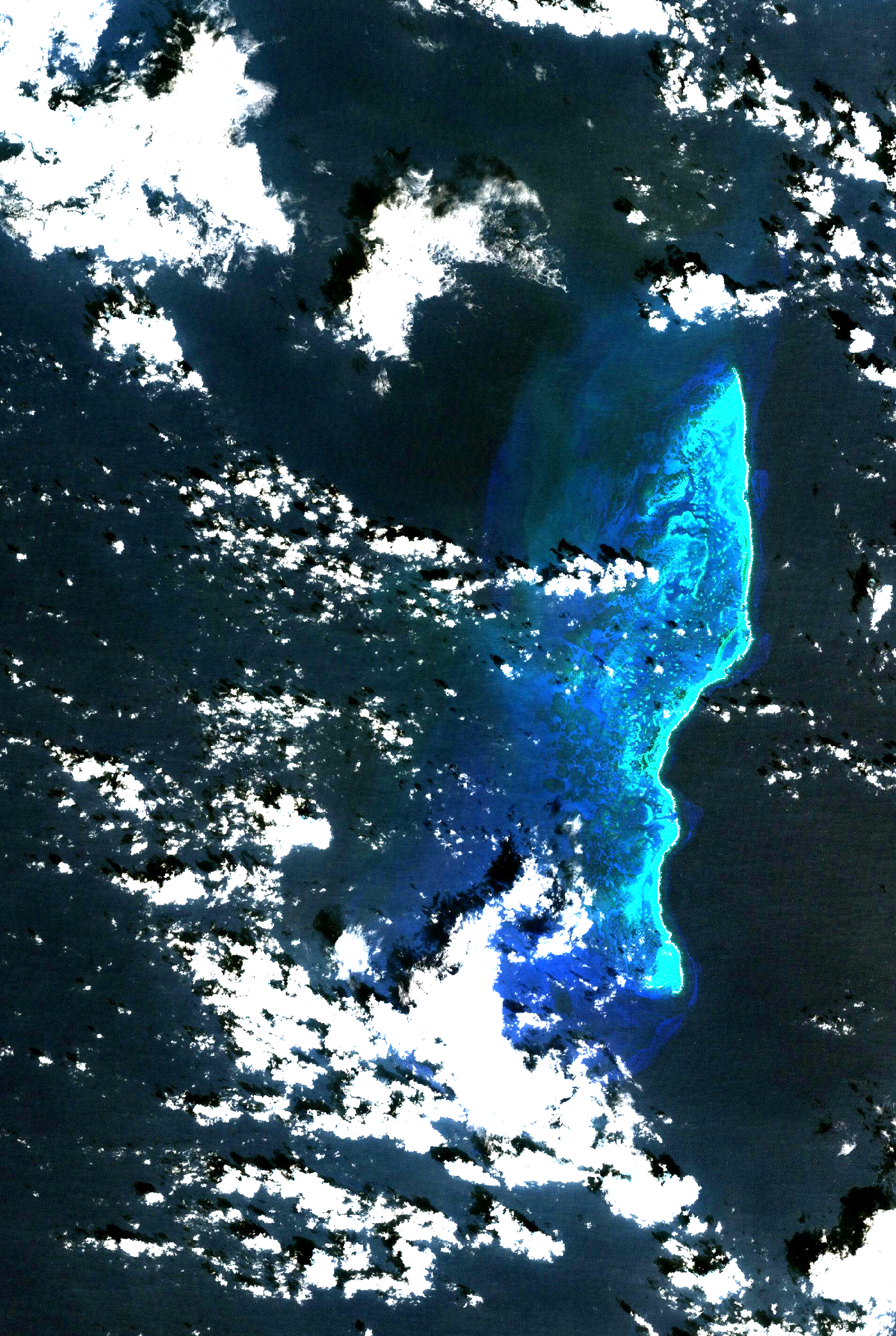
- Landsat image of Quita Sueño Bank

- Location within Colombia Location within the Caribbean

Geography
- Location: Caribbean Sea
- Coordinates: 14°19′N 81°10′W

Administration
- Colombia

Quita Sueño Bank (claimed as Quitasueño) is a reef formation controlled by Colombia and within the Archipelago of San Andrés, Providencia and Santa Catalina. The United States, under the Guano Islands Act, claimed the reef in 1869, and retained its claim until 1981. The United States constructed a lighthouse in 1919.

== History ==
In 1869, James Jennett claimed the bank for the United States under the Guano Islands Act of 1856. An agreement between the United States and Colombia on 10 April 1928 left the area under American control. On 8 September 1972, the United States and Colombia signed a treaty in which the United States renounced its claims to the Quita Sueño Bank, Roncador Bank, and Serrana Bank. The United States regarded Quita Sueño Bank as having no emergent land and thus ineligible for the basis of a sovereignty claim. The treaty came into effect on 17 September 1981.

In the northern part of the eastern reef is Quita Sueño Light. The location is named Cayo Quitasueño on the government nautical chart at 14°28′57.2298″N 81°7′39.7632″W. The light is erected on top of a square platform. A lighthouse at this location had originally been established by the United States in 1919. The current structure, erected in 1977, is now called Faro Quitasueño Norte. In 2008, a second lighthouse, Faro Quitasueño Sur, was established in the southern part of the reef at 14°09′17″N 81°9′40″W.

Nicaragua also had a claim to the bank. On 19 November 2012, the International Court of Justice upheld Colombia's claim to Quitasueño, plus a 12-NM territorial zone, and re-defined Nicaragua's exclusive economic zone (EEZ), thus surrounding the island bank. It deemed one of the bank's 54 features to be an island at high tide eligible for a sovereignty claim (elevation 70 cm, area 1 m^{2}) and created enclaves as an equitable solution. The area of the bank, excluding the 12-mile zone, is ~290 km^{2}.

== See also ==
- List of Guano Island claims

== Works cited ==
=== Books ===
- Goldhamer, Herbert (1972). The Foreign Powers in Latin America. Princeton University Press. ISBN 9780691619873.

=== Journals ===
- Fallon, Joseph (1991). "Federal Policy and U.S. Territories: The Political Restructuring of the United States of America". Pacific Affairs. 64 (1). University of British Columbia: 23–41. doi:10.2307/2760361. JSTOR 2760361.
- Rovine, Arthur (1973). "Contemporary Practice of the United States Relating to International Law". American Journal of International Law. 67 (1). Cambridge University Press: 118–126. doi:10.2307/2199101. JSTOR 2199101.
