= Alice Shoal =

Submerged reef in the Caribbean Sea shared between Colombia and Jamaica

Coordinates: 16°05′N 79°22′W

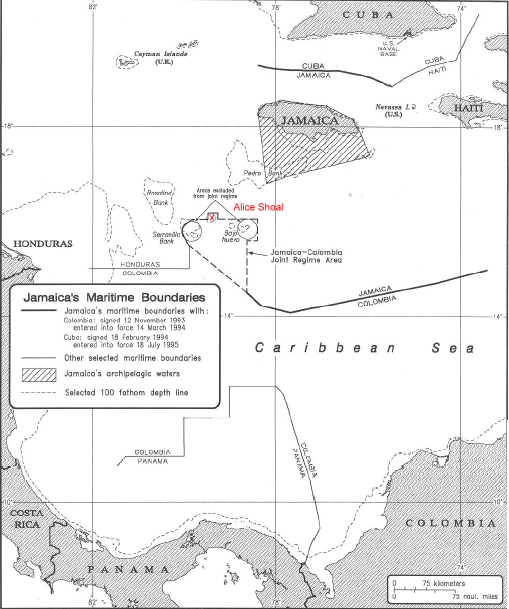
Location of Alice Shoal within the Jamaica–Colombia Joint Regime Area

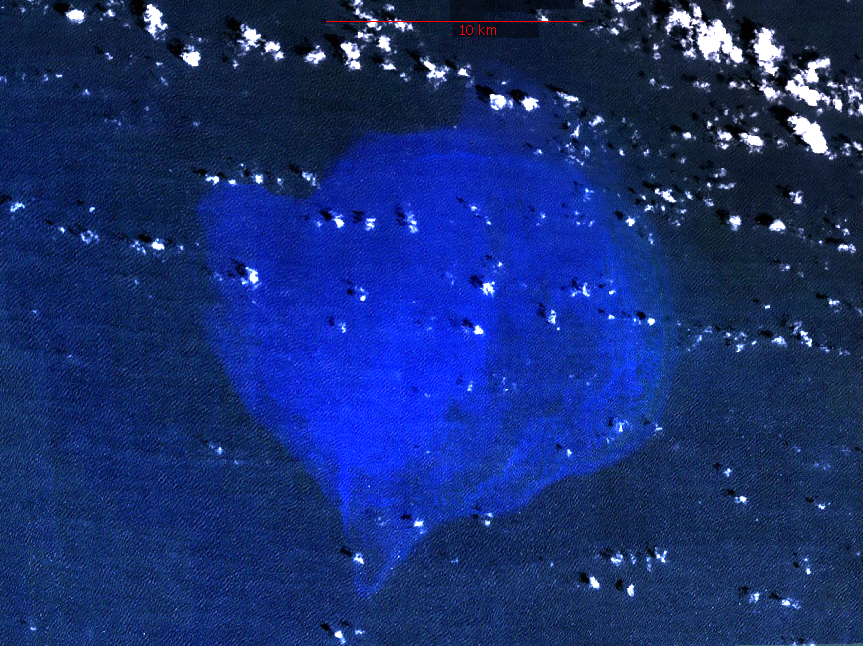
NASA Landsat image of Alice Shoal

Alice Shoal (Spanish: Banco Alicia or Bajo Alicia) is a wholly submerged reef, located in the western Caribbean Sea, about 260 kilometres (160 miles) southwest of Jamaica. The mainland of Colombia lies 740 kilometres (460 miles) away to the southeast.

Alice Shoal is situated 31 km northeast of East Cay of Serranilla Bank, and 48 km west of Bajo Nuevo Bank. The bank is about 16 km in diameter as defined by the 200 m isobath, which corresponds to an area of more than 200 km^{2}. There are no islets, cays or above-water rocks. The bank has a minimum depth of 11 metres (36 feet), with coral bottom, at its eastern edge. Depths over the greater part of the bank are less than 63 metres (207 feet). The bottom is fine white sand. Rip currents mark the edges of the bank.

The reef falls within the Joint Regime Area of Colombia and Jamaica, a maritime delimitation zone which allows for co-operative control and exploitation of resources between the two states.
