= Roncador Bank =

Colombian atoll in the Caribbean Sea

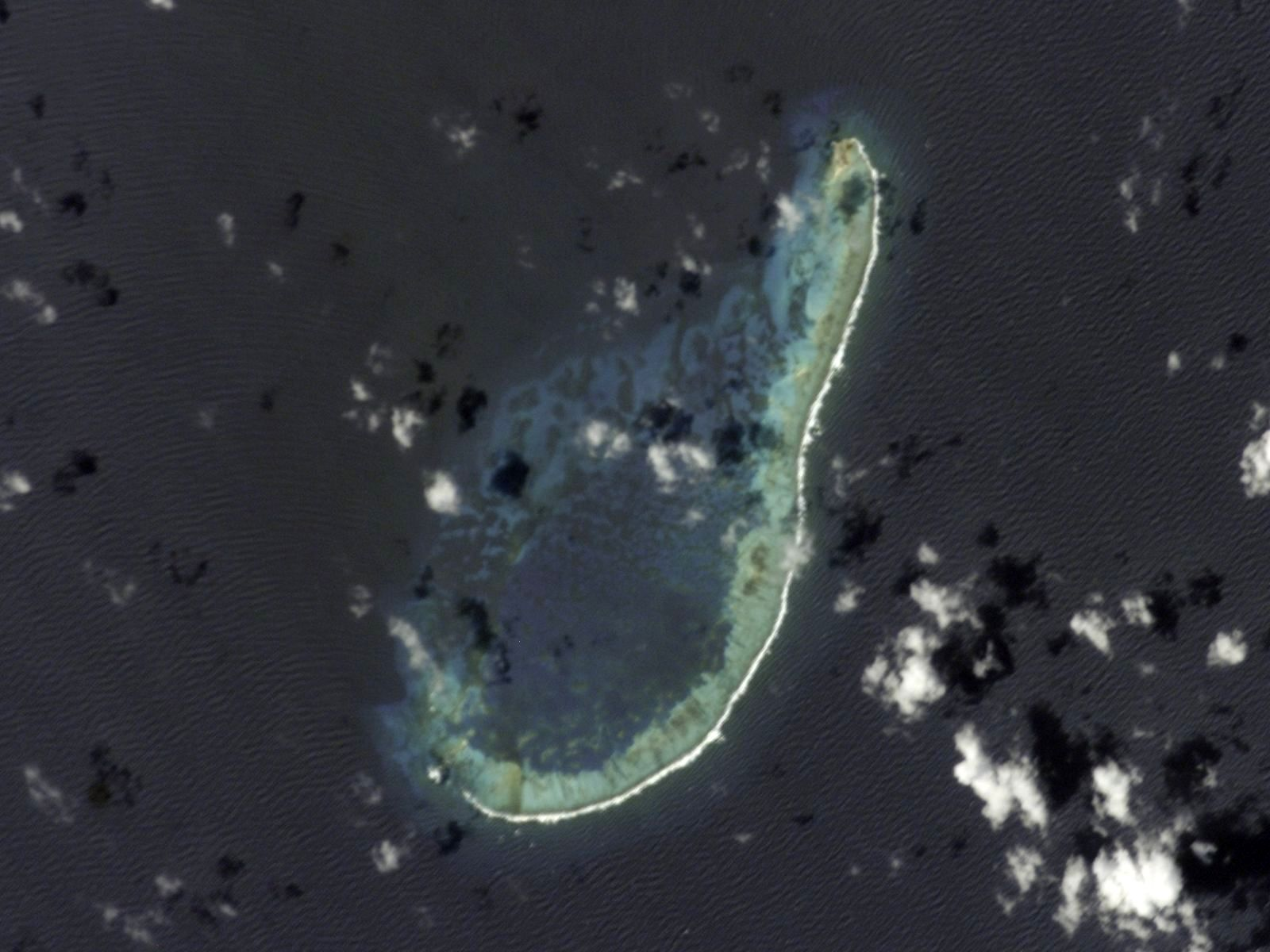
- Roncador Bank

- Location within Colombia Location within the Caribbean

Geography
- Location: Caribbean Sea
- Coordinates: 13°34′N 80°04′W

Administration
- Colombia

Roncador Bank is a mostly submerged atoll with several sandy cays. It lies in the west Caribbean Sea off the coast of Central America.

== Geography ==
It is about 15 by 6 kilometers in size, with an area of 65 km^{2} composed mostly of lagoon. It is in the northern area lies Roncador Cay. It also has a small coral reef.

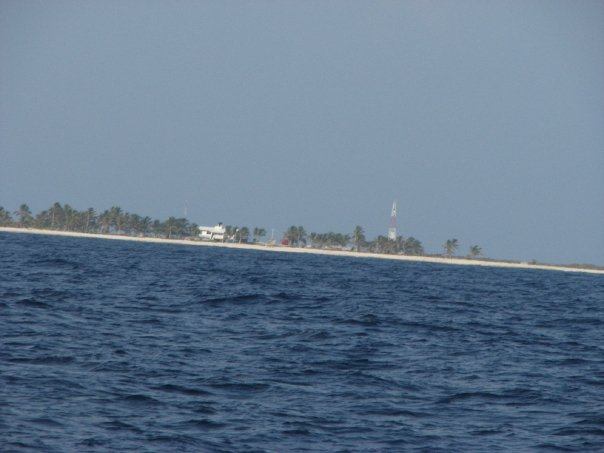
Roncador Bank.

Location of Roncador Bank

== History ==
Initially claimed by the United States under the Guano Islands Act of 1856, the atoll was ceded by the United States to Colombia on September 17, 1981, as the result of the Vásquez-Saccio Treaty (signed in 1972).

In 1894, the USS Kearsarge was shipwrecked on Roncador Bank.

There are several dilapidated houses on it built by American troops during the Cuban Missile Crisis.

== Lighthouse ==
An old, disused lighthouse is at its northern end. A new lighthouse has been operating since 1977.

== See also ==
- List of Guano Island claims
