= Cabo Gracias a Dios =

Cape in Central America

Coordinates: 14°59′48″N 83°08′54″W

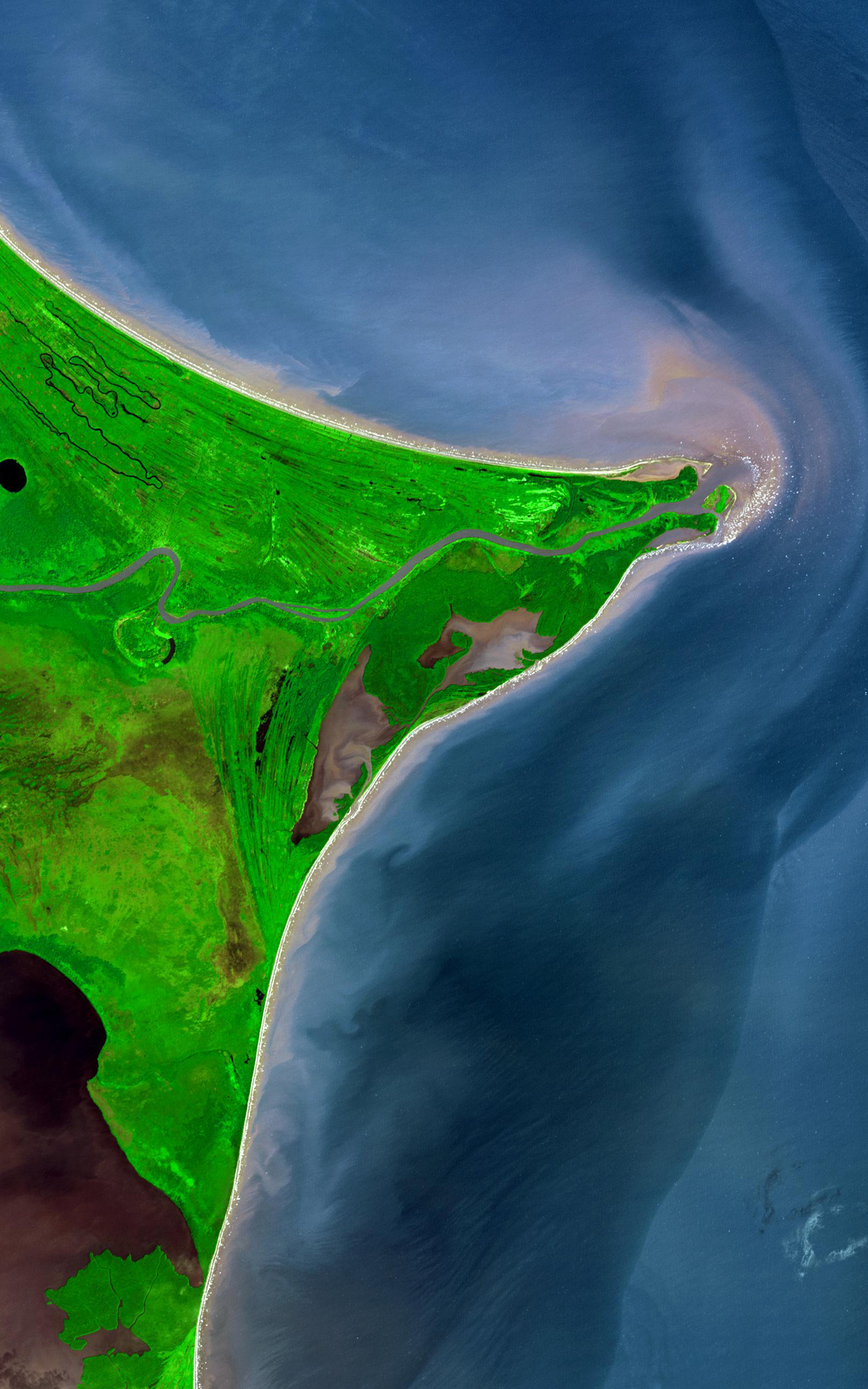
Seen from space

Cabo Gracias a Dios, known in Miskito as Kip Almuk (“Old Cape”), is a prominent headland and river delta situated at the midpoint of the eastern coast of Central America, marking the geographical apex of the Mosquito Coast. It is the point where the Coco River flows into the Caribbean Sea.

The point was designated as the official Honduras–Nicaragua border by an award of King Alfonso XIII of Spain in 1906, and confirmed by the International Court of Justice in 1960. The exact terminal point was determined to be at 14°59.8'N 83°08.9'W.

The name is Spanish for "Cape Thank God" and is said to have been bestowed by Christopher Columbus on his last voyage in 1502 when the weather calmed suddenly as he rounded the cape during a severe storm. This incident also gave the name to Honduras, which means 'depths' in Spanish, since the complete phrase is said to have been 'Gracias a Dios hemos salido de esas Honduras', or 'Thank God we have come out from those depths', and both places were automatically named at that very moment.

== Geography ==
=== Climate ===
Climate data for Cabo Gracias a Dios
Month	Jan	Feb	Mar	Apr	May	Jun	Jul	Aug	Sep	Oct	Nov	Dec	Year
Mean daily maximum °C (°F)	29 (84)	29 (84)	31 (87)	31 (88)	31 (88)	31 (87)	31 (88)	32 (89)	32 (89)	31 (87)	29 (85)	29 (85)	31 (87)
Mean daily minimum °C (°F)	22 (71)	21 (70)	22 (71)	23 (73)	23 (74)	23 (74)	23 (74)	24 (75)	23 (73)	22 (72)	22 (72)	23 (73)	23 (73)
Average precipitation mm (inches)	250 (9.9)	200 (7.8)	79 (3.1)	130 (5.3)	410 (16)	640 (25)	300 (12)	200 (8)	430 (17)	510 (20)	530 (21)	250 (10)	3,900 (155)
Source: Weatherbase
