= List of Caribbean islands =

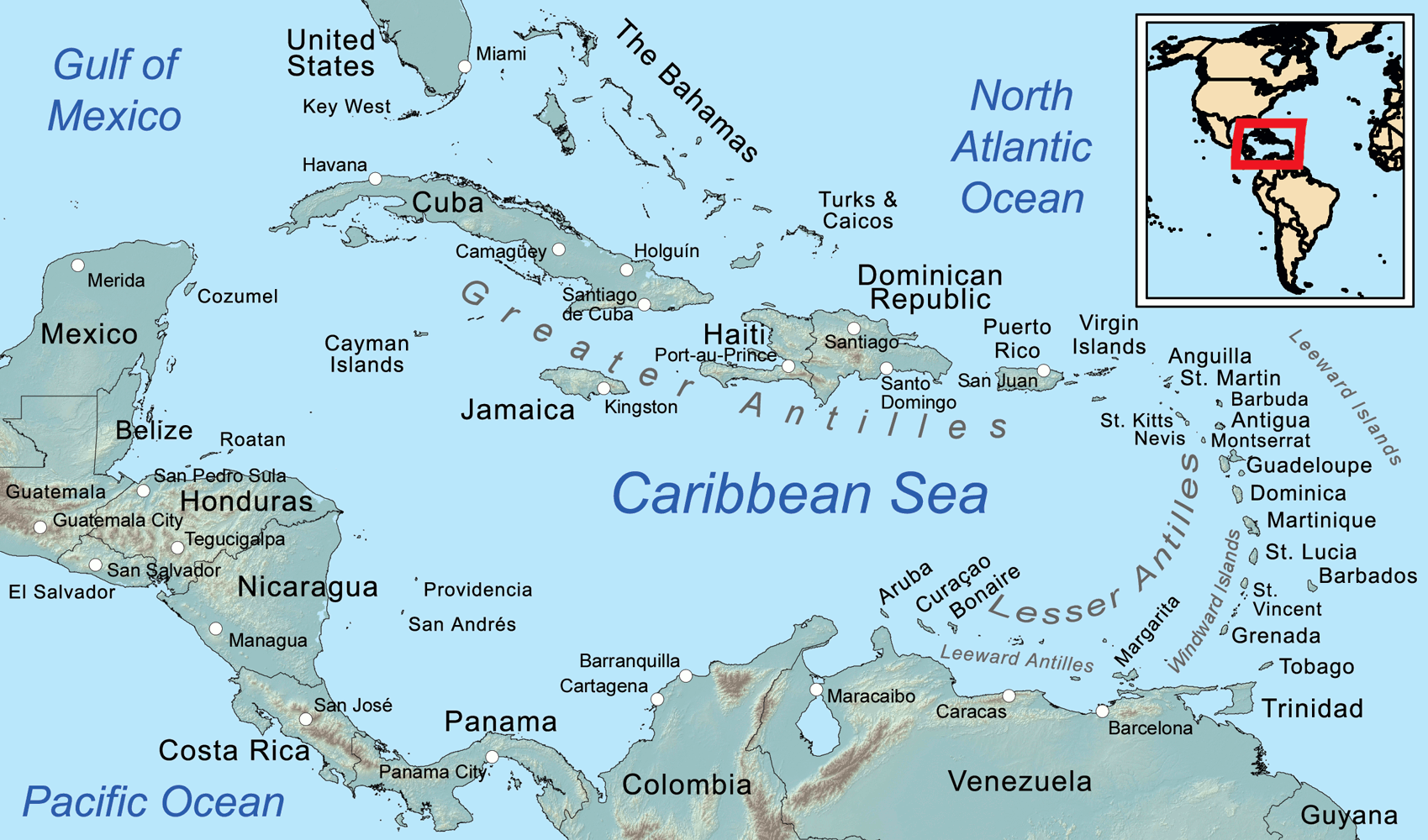
The Caribbean Sea

Most of the Caribbean countries are islands in the Caribbean Sea, with only a few in inland lakes. The largest islands include Cuba, Hispaniola, Jamaica, and Puerto Rico. Some of the smallest islands are referred to as a rock or reef.

Islands are listed in alphabetical order by sovereign state. Islands with coordinates can be seen on the map linked to the right.

== Antigua and Barbuda ==
Antigua and Barbuda

There are 54 islands in Antigua and Barbuda. There are three main islands, the two populated islands (Antigua and Barbuda) and Redonda. There are 51 off-shore islands. The islands of the country of Antigua and Barbuda include:

- Antigua, 17°5′0″N 61°48′0″W, 280 km^{2} (110 sq mi)
- Jenny Island
- Exchange Island^{17°08′11″N 61°43′23″W}
- Rabbit Island^{17°8′10″N 61°43′52″W}
- Lobster Island^{17°8′1″N 61°43′47″W}
- Long Island^{17°9′19″N 61°45′14″W}
- Maiden Island^{17°8′44″N 61°45′48″W}
- Rat Island^{17°7′44″N 61°46′11″W}
- Little Bird Island^{17°09′27″N 61°44′17″W}
- Hell's Gate Island^{17°8′26″N 61°43′18″W}
- Monocle Point Island
- Red Head Island^{17°8′16″N 61°43′41″W}
- Guiana Island^{17°7′26″N 61°43′57″W}
- Crump Island^{17°6′32″N 61°43′8″W}
- Nanny Island (Henry Island)^{17°04′05″N 61°41′26″W}
- Laviscounts Island^{17°5′57″N 61°43′24″W}
- Bird Island^{17°4′45″N 61°40′20″W}
- Round Island
- Hawes Island^{17°6′46″N 61°43′40″W}
- Little Island
- Green Island^{17°4′11″N 61°39′58″W}
- Pelican Island^{17°06′21″N 61°42′17″W}
- York Island^{17°3′11″N 61°40′9″W}
- Codrington Island^{17°6′9″N 61°42′21″W}
- Blake Island^{17°0′52″N 61°46′58″W}
- Cinnamon Island^{17°7′21″N 61°47′9″W}
- Five Islands^{17°04′50″N 61°54′50″W}
- Hawksbill Rock^{17°6′43″N 61°54′8″W}
- Johnson Island^{17°01′31″N 61°53′28″W}
- Maiden Island^{17°5′44″N 61°53′14″W}
- Moor Rock^{17°09′49″N 61°45′27.0″W}
- Mouse Island^{17°07′42.0″N 61°46′13″W}
- Neck of Land^{17°03′40″N 61°40′29″W}
- Sandy Island^{17°8′4″N 61°55′36″W}
- Smith Island^{17°2′27″N 61°40′48″W}
- The Sisters^{17°9′39″N 61°52′6″W}
- Vernon's Island^{17°6′51″N 61°46′8″W}
- Wicked Will Island^{17°02′53.5″N 61°40′19.5″W}
- Barbuda, 17°37′0″N 61°48′0″W, 161 km^{2} (62 sq mi)
  - Goat Island^{17°42′20″N 61°50′49″W}
  - Kid Island^{17°41′47″N 61°48′52″W}
  - Man of War Island^{17°40′5″N 61°51′5″W}
  - Rabbit Island^{17°42′23″N 61°49′36″W}
- Redonda (uninhabited), 16°56′20″N 62°20′30″W, 1.3 km^{2} (0.50 sq mi)

=== Northeast Marine Management Area ===
Islands in the Northeast Marine Management Area
Name	Image	Coordinates	Area
Prickly Pear Island			
Great Bird Island			
Galley Island Major			5904 square metre
Galley Island Minor			1691 square metre

== Belize ==
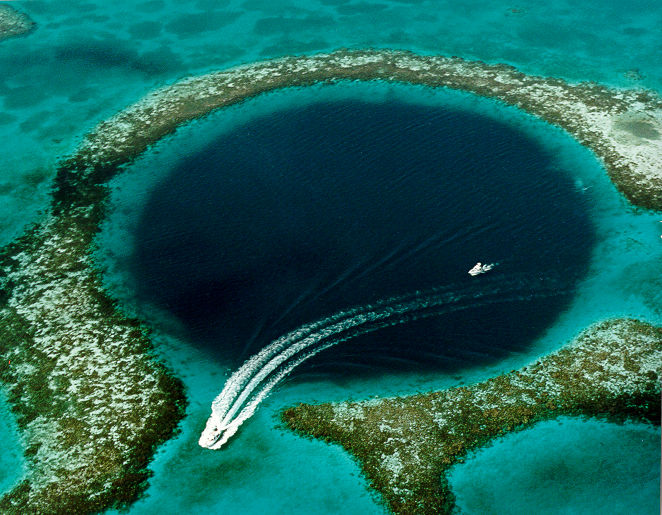
Great Blue Hole, Lighthouse Reef

There are about 180 islands in Belize. Some of the larger islands of Belize in the Caribbean Sea include:

- Turneffe Atoll (Turneffe Islands), 116 km^{2} (45 sq mi), 17°20′00″N 87°52′00″W
- Ambergris Group, 76.8 km^{2} (29.7 sq mi), 18°02′51″N 87°55′22″W
- Douglas Cay, 65 km^{2} (25 sq mi), 17°20′00″N 87°55′00″W
- Drowned Cays, 20.2 km^{2} (7.8 sq mi), 17°28′05″N 88°04′48″W
- Hick's Cayes, 10.5 km^{2} (4.1 sq mi), 17°39′34″N 88°09′31″W
- Lighthouse Reef, 17°18′N 87°33′W

== Colombia ==
Several Departments of Colombia include islands in the Caribbean area.

=== Bolívar Department ===
Rosario Islands

Islands of the Bolívar Department of Colombia include:

- Rosario Islands (Islas del Rosario), 10°10′00″N 75°46′00″W
  - Isla Grande, 10°10′55″N 75°44′06″W
  - Isla Marina, 10°10′28″N 75°45′14″W
  - Isla de Roberto, 10°11′00″N 75°46′00″W
  - Isla Rosario, 10°11′53″N 75°45′26″W
  - Isla del Tesoro, 10°14′06″N 75°44′19″W
  - Isla del Pirata, 10°24′03″N 75°33′17″W
  - Isla Pelicano, 10°11′05″N 75°43′40″W
  - Isla Rosa, 10°10′50″N 75°46′33″W
  - Isla Gigi, 10°24′03″N 75°33′17″W
- Fuerte Island, 9°23′13″N 76°10′52″W
- Tierra Bomba Island (Isla Tierra Bomba), 10°21′22″N 75°34′20″W
- Isla Barú, 10°12′58″N 75°36′01″W
- Isla de la Manga, 10°24′44″N 75°32′08″W
- Isla Diablo, 10°23′52″N 75°31′37″W
- Isla de Manzanillo, 10°23′00″N 75°32′00″W
- Isla Maparadita, 10°22′00″N 75°30′47″W
- Isla Cocosolo, 10°21′01″N 75°30′50″W
- Isla Brujas, 10°19′59″N 75°30′49″W
- Isla Abanico, 10°18′26″N 75°34′44″W

=== Córdoba Department ===
Islands in the Córdoba Department include:

- Islas Tortuguilla, 9°01′37″N 76°20′28″W

=== Magdalena Department ===
Islands in the Magdalena Department include:

- Isla de Salamanca, 10°58′00″N 74°30′00″W
- Isla El Morro, 11°14′59″N 74°13′48″W
- Isla de La Aguja, 11°19′10″N 74°11′48″W]
- Isla Bóqueron Grande, 10°57′34″N 74°17′52″W

=== San Andrés, Providencia and Santa Catalina ===
Islas de San Andrés y Providencia

Islands in the Archipelago of San Andrés, Providencia and Santa Catalina include:

- Acuario Cay (Cayo Rosa), 12°33′00″N 81°41′00″W
- Alice Shoal (submerged reef), 16°05′N 79°22′W
- Bajo Nuevo Bank, 15°53′N 78°38′W
- Bayley Islet (Cayo Bayley), 13°21′N 81°21′W
- Basalt Islet
- Brothers Cay (Cayos Hermanos), 13°21′N 81°21′W
- Crab Cay (Cayo Congrejo), 13°22′00″N 81°21′00″W
- Cayos de Albuquerque, 12°10′01″N 81°51′31″W
  - North Cay
  - South Cay
- Córdoba Cay (also known as Haynes Cay), 12°33′05″N 81°41′17″W
- Easy Cay
- Grunt Cay
- Cayos de Este Sudeste, 12°25′14″N 81°28′37″W
  - Bolívar Cay (also known as Courtown or West Cay)
  - East Cay
- Palm Cay
- Isla de Providencia, 13°21′10″N 81°22′27″W
- Quita Sueño Bank, 14°19′N 81°10′W
- Rocky Cay, 12°32′30″N 81°42′07″W
- Roncador Bank, 13°34′N 80°04′W
- Roncador Cay, 13°32′N 80°03′W
- San Andrés Island, 12°35′N 81°42′W
- Santa Catalina Island, 13°23′18″N 81°22′25″W
- Santander Cay (also known as Cotton Cay)
- Serrana Bank, 14°20′N 80°20′W
- Serranilla Bank, 15°50′N 79°50′W
- Sucre Islet (also known as Johnny Cay)

=== Sucre Department ===
Archipelago of San Bernardo

Islands in the Sucre Department include the following islands in the Archipelago of San Bernardo:

- Bóqueron Island
- Cabruna Island (Isla Cabruna), 9°44′32″N 75°41′05″W
- Ceycén Island (Isla Ceycen), 9°41′39″N 75°51′16″W
- Mangle Island, 9°45′50″N 75°47′18″W
- Maravilla Island (Isla Maravilla), 9°44′58″N 75°52′48″W
- Múcura Island (Isla Múcura ), 9°46′52″N 75°52′20″W
- Palma Island (Isla Palma), 9°44′38″N 75°49′02″W
- Panda Island, 9°44′40″N 75°49′07″W
- Salamanquilla Island, 9°44′10″N 75°44′54″W
- San Barnardo Island, 9°41′40″N 75°42′12″W
- Santa Cruz del Islote, 9°47′09″N 75°51′33″W
- Tintipán Island, 9°47′38″N 75°50′35″W

== Costa Rica ==
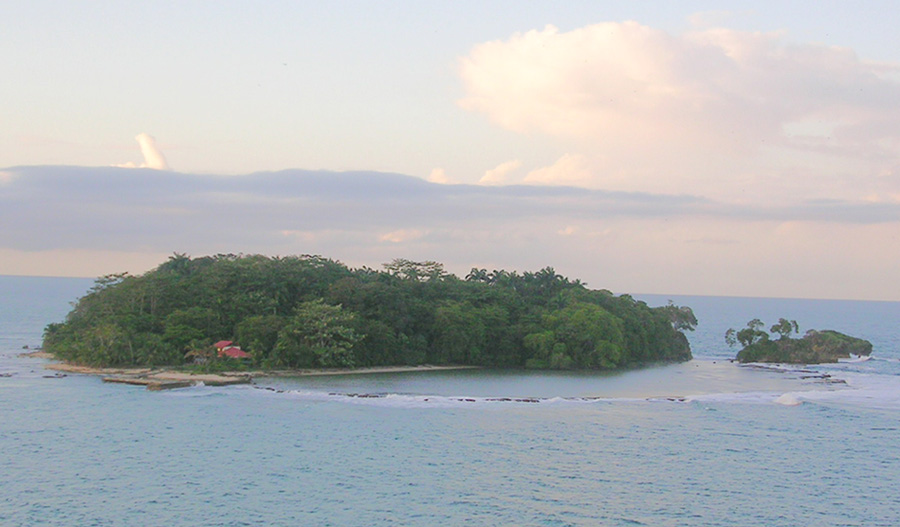
Isla Uvita, Costa Rica

There are about 79 islands in Costa Rica. The largest islands in the Caribbean Sea are listed below:

- Isla Calero, 151.6 km^{2} (58.5 sq mi), 10°50′58″N 83°37′23″W
- Isla Brava, 44.4 km^{2} (17.1 sq mi)
- Isla Uvita, 0.8 km^{2} (0.31 sq mi), 9°59′36″N 83°00′40″W

== Cuba ==
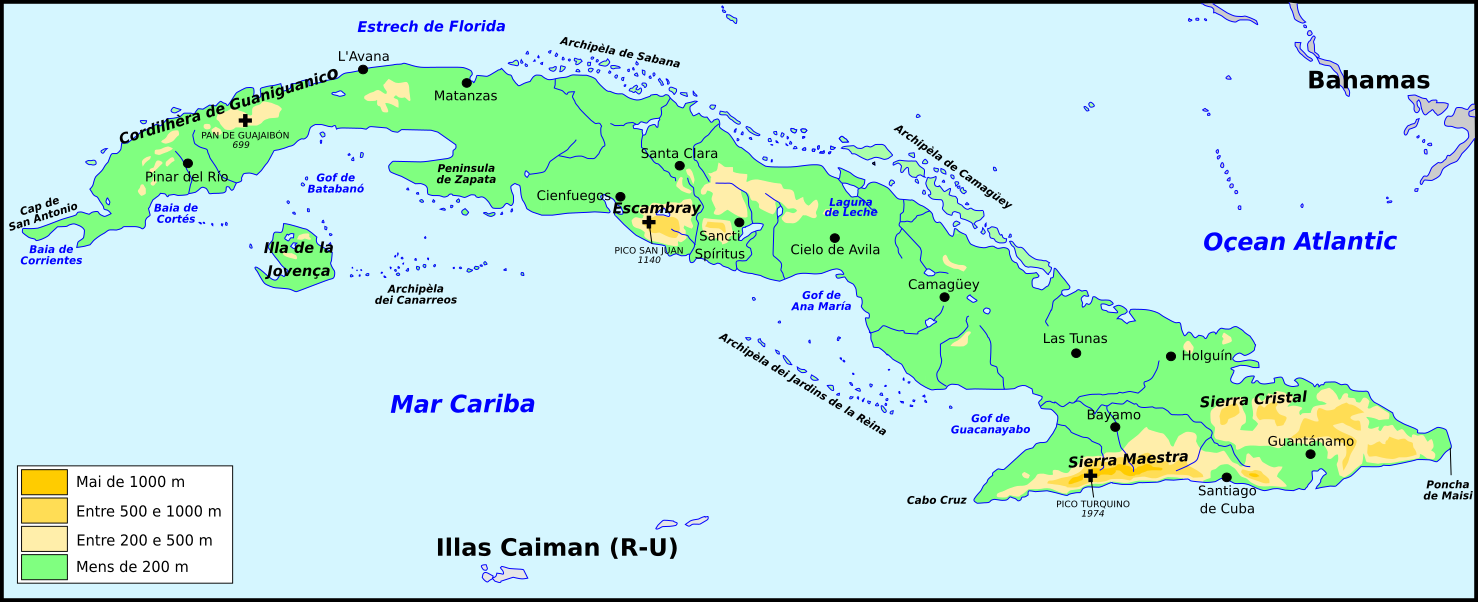
Cuba, the largest island in the Caribbean

Cuba consists of over 4,000 islands and cays surrounding the country's main island, many of which make up archipelagos. Off the south coast are two main archipelagos, Jardines de la Reina and the Canarreos Archipelago. The Sabana-Camagüey Archipelago runs along the northern coast and contains roughly 2,517 cays and islands. The Colorados Archipelago is located off the north-western coast. The following islands are some of the major islands in the island country Cuba:

- Cuba (largest island in the Caribbean 104,556 km^{2} (40,369 sq mi), 21°56′02″N 78°45′15″W
- Canarreos Archipelago, 21°38′22″N 82°14′10″W
  - Isla de la Juventud (2nd largest island in Cuba at 2,200 km^{2} (850 sq mi)), 21°45′N 82°51′W
  - Ernst Thälmann Island (formerly Cayo Blancos del Sur, also called Cayo Ernesto Thaelmann), 22°02′00″N 81°24′00″W
  - Cayo Largo del Sur, 21°38′00″N 81°28′00″W
- Colorados Archipelago, 22°24′N 84°25′W
  - Cayo Levisa, 22°53′04″N 83°31′27″W
  - Cayo Punta Arenas, 23°11′53″N 80°43′21″W
  - Cayo Buenavista
  - Cayo Ines de Soto, 22°48′26″N 83°48′03″W
- Jardines del Rey, 22°09′N 77°53′W
  - Cayo Coco (370 km^{2} (140 sq mi), 22°30′04″N 78°25′37″W
  - Cayo Esquivel, 23°03′05″N 80°04′27″W
  - Cayo Guajaba, 21°50′44″N 77°31′02″W
  - Cayo Guillermo, 22°35′42″N 78°39′59″W
  - Cayo Romano (777 km^{2} (300 sq mi), 22°04′11″N 77°50′02″W
  - Cayo Sabinal, 21°40′04″N 77°17′56″W
  - Cayo Saetía, 20°45′34″N 75°31′15″W
  - Cayo Santa María, 22°38′42″N 79°03′29″W
- Jardines de la Reina, 20°52′04″N 78°58′21″W
- Sabana-Camagüey Archipelago, 23°00′N 80°00′W
  - Cayo Cruz del Padre, 23°16′03″N 80°54′43″W
  - Cayo Fragoso, Villa Clara, 22°43′10″N 79°29′34″W

== Dominica ==
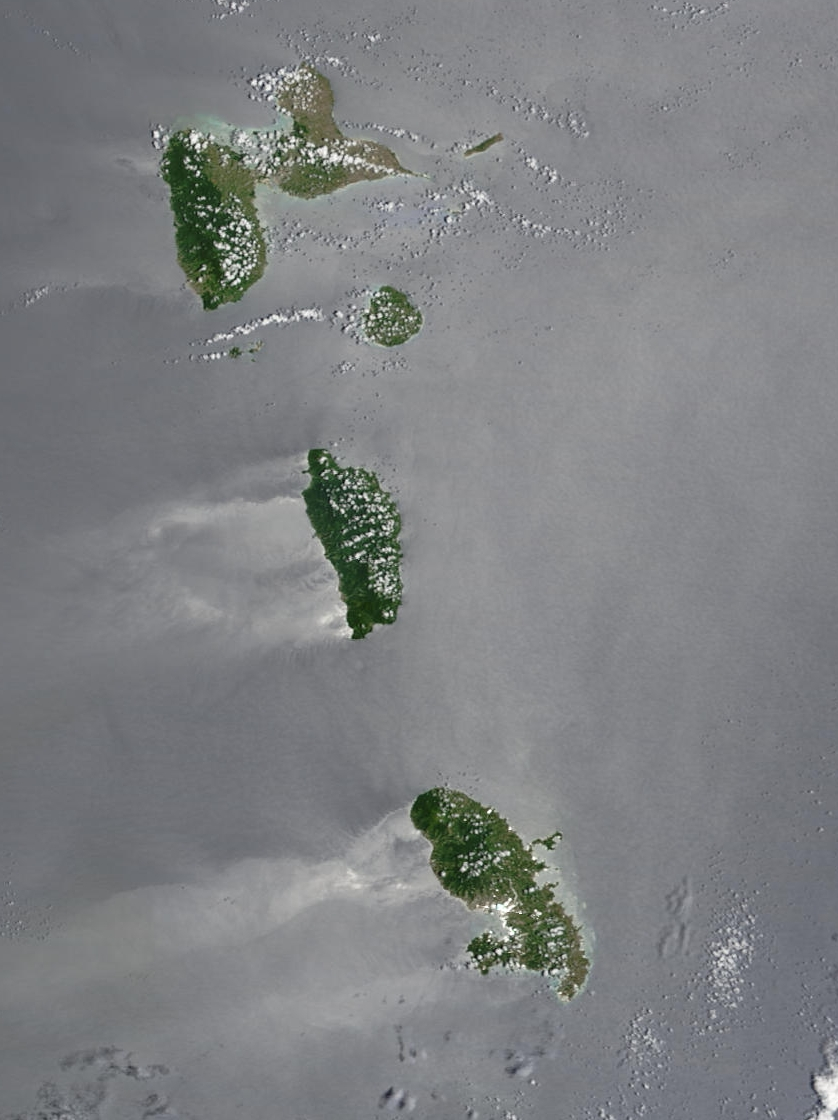
Dominica is an island in the eastern Caribbean Sea with the Guadeloupe to the north and Martinique to the south.

The island nation of Dominica with a total area of 750 km^{2} (290 sq mi) includes two small, off-shore islands and one disputed island:

- Dominica (745.96 km²), 15°26′14″N 61°20′32″W
- Petit L'Ilet (0.0013 km²), 15°29′42″N 61°15′02″W
- Gros L'Ilet (0.007 km²), 15°29′35″N 61°14′45″W
- Bird Island (Ile de Aves) – in dispute with Venezuela (0.032 km²), 15°40′07″N 63°37′05″W

== Dominican Republic ==
There are about 73 islands in the Dominican Republic, including the following islands:

- Eastern part of the island of Hispaniola, 19°N 71°W)
- Catalina Island, 18°21′28″N 69°00′26″W
- Isla Beata, 17°35′00″N 71°31′00″W
- Isla Alto Velo, 17°28′33″N 71°38′31″W
- Cayo Levantado (Bacardi Island), 19°17′54″N 69°11′59″W
- Isla Saona, 18°08′48″N 68°41′16″W

== France ==
The following sections show the islands of French departments in the Caribbean.

=== Guadeloupe ===
Guadeloupe consists of six inhabited islands—Basse-Terre, Grande-Terre, Marie-Galante, La Désirade, and the two inhabited islands in the Îles des Saintes—as well as many uninhabited islands and outcroppings.

- Baleine du Sud (Îles de la Petite Terre), 16°10′19″N 61°06′42″W
- Basse-Terre, 16°08′58″N 61°40′41″W
- Grand Îlet
- Grand Îlet (Îles des Saintes), 15°51′22″N 61°36′38″W
- Grande-Terre, 16°19′03″N 61°25′43″W
- Îlet à Cabrit (Îles des Saintes), 15°52′31″N 61°35′41″W
- Îlet à Caret, 16°21′23″N 61°37′39″W
- Îlet à Christophe (Guadeloupe island), 16°17′40″N 61°34′11″W
- Îlet à Colas (Guadeloupe island), 16°20′47″N 61°34′27″W
- Îlet à Fajou (Guadeloupe island), 16°20′59″N 61°35′11″W
- Îlet à Kahouanne (Guadeloupe island), 16°22′01″N 61°46′47″W
- Îlet Blanc (Guadeloupe island), 16°20′53″N 61°41′17″W
- Îlet Boissard (Guadeloupe island), 16°13′20″N 61°33′08″W
- Îlet Brument (Guadeloupe island)
- Îlet Crabière (Guadeloupe island), 16°19′19″N 61°40′13″W
- Îlet de Terre-de-Bas (Îles de la Petite Terre, la Désirade), 15°51′22″N 61°38′05″W
- Îlet de Terre-de-Haut (Îles de la Petite Terre, la Désirade), 15°52′00″N 61°35′00″W
- Îlet de Vieux Fort (Marie-Galante), 15°59′47″N 61°18′20″W
- Îlet du Gosier (Guadeloupe island), 16°11′56″N 61°29′29″W
- Îlet Duberran (Guadeloupe island), 16°20′57″N 61°30′30″W
- Îlet Feuille (Guadeloupe island), 16°13′45″N 61°33′22″W
- Îlet Fortune (Guadeloupe island), 16°09′01″N 61°33′42″W
- Îlet Frégate de Haut (Guadeloupe island)
- Îlet Macou (Guadeloupe island), 16°20′59″N 61°31′38″W
- Îlet Mangue à Laurette (Guadeloupe island), 16°19′22″N 61°38′14″W
- Îlets de Carénage (Guadeloupe island), 16°20′00″N 61°40′00″W
- Îlets de Pigeon (Guadeloupe island)
- La Biche (Guadeloupe island), 16°20′12″N 61°39′05″W
- La Coche (Îles des Saintes), 15°50′11″N 61°36′34″W
- La Désirade, 16°19′06″N 61°03′07″W
- La Redonde (Îles des Saintes), 15°51′04″N 61°35′32″W
- Le Pâté (Îles des Saintes), 15°52′19″N 61°37′39″W
- Les Augustins (Îles des Saintes)
- Marie-Galante, 15°56′09″N 61°16′14″W
- Terre-de-Bas (Îles des Saintes), 16°10′12″N 61°07′08″W
- Terre-de-Haut (Îles des Saintes), 16°10′38″N 61°06′28″W
- Tête à l'Anglais (Guadeloupe island)

=== Martinique ===
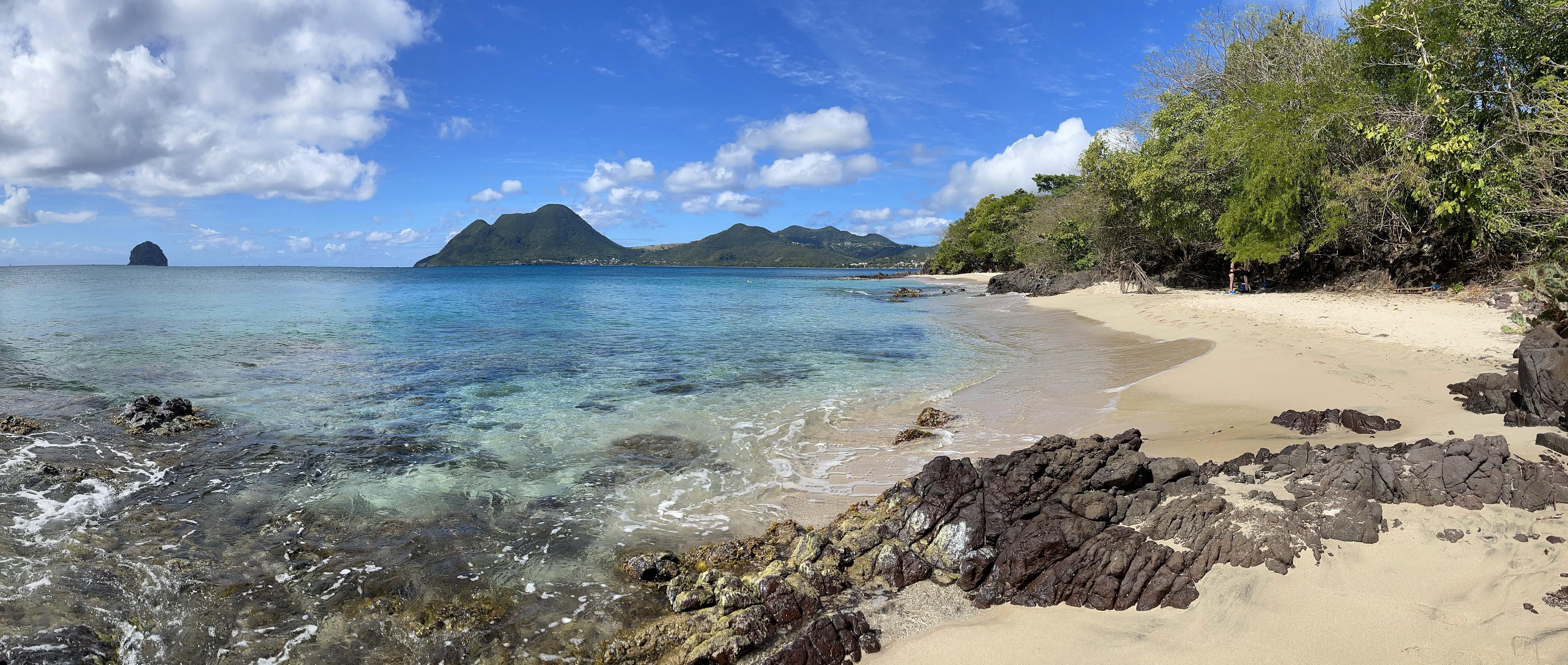
Diamond Rock and the Sleeping Woman, the defining landscape of the southwest peninsula of Martinique

There are about 46 islands in Martinique, including the following:

- Îlet aux Rats (Bats Island), 14°41′02″N 60°53′56″W
- Caye Pinsonelle, 14°37′00″N 60°50′00″W
- Diamond Rock, 14°26′36″N 61°02′21″W
- Petit Îlet Duprey, 14°27′44″N 60°53′10″W
- Gros Îlet (Îlet Mandoline), 14°37′55″N 60°53′14″W
- Îlet Chancel, 14°41′38″N 60°53′20″W
- Île Petite Grenade, 14°34′05″N 60°50′09″W
- Îlet à Eaux Rats (Rocks), 14°41′02″N 60°53′56″W
- Îlet à Ramiers, 14°32′39″N 61°04′44″W
- Îlet à Toiroux (Îlet Poirier), 14°24′39″N 60°49′58″W
- Îlet Aux Rats, 14°41′02″N 60°53′56″W
- Îlet Baude, 14°27′03″N 60°52′30″W
- Îlet Boisseau (Îlet des Chardons), 14°40′26″N 60°52′49″W
- Îlet Cabrits, 14°23′26″N 60°52′04″W
- Îlet Chancel (Ilet Ramville), 14°41′38″N 60°53′20″W
- Ilet Chevalier (Ilet Lezard), 14°25′49″N 60°49′39″W
- Ilet De La Rose (Îlet Madame), 14°40′13″N 60°52′58″W
- Îlet Du Galion, 14°43′51″N 60°55′59″W
- Îlet Duquesnay, 14°27′32″N 60°53′07″W
- Îlet du Trésor, 14°45′24″N 60°52′45″W
- Ilet Fregate, 14°36′22″N 60°51′50″W
- Îlet Hardy, 14°25′01″N 60°49′55″W
- Îlet La Perle, 14°50′31″N 61°13′40″W
- Îlet Lapin, 14°46′35″N 60°52′30″W
- Îlet Lavigne (Gros Îlet), 14°37′55″N 60°53′14″W
- Îlet Long, 14°36′43″N 60°51′18″W
- Îlet Métrente, 14°37′07″N 60°51′49″W
- Îlet Oscar (Bonchard), 14°37′39″N 60°51′11″W
- Îlet Pelé, 14°36′54″N 60°50′55″W
- Îlet Petit Piton (Rocher de la Grotte), 14°41′04″N 60°52′49″W
- Ilet Petit Vincent, 14°41′16″N 60°55′14″W
- Îlet Petite Martinique, 14°41′08″N 60°54′35″W
- Îlet Ragot (Îlet de la Grotte, Ilet Duchamp), 14°41′16″N 60°53′00″W
- Îlet Saint Aubin, 14°46′21″N 60°57′49″W
- Îlet Sainte-Marie, 14°47′16″N 60°59′21″W
- Îlet Tartane, 14°45′53″N 60°55′21″W
- Îlet Thierry, 14°37′32″N 60°50′53″W
- Ilets Aux Chiens, 14°26′43″N 60°48′59″W
- Les Trois Ilets, 14°32′39″N 61°02′07″W
- Martinique, 14°39′46″N 61°00′15″W
- Petit Îlet, 14°33′02″N 61°00′13″W
- Petit Ilet Duprey, 14°27′44″N 60°53′10″W
- Sugarloaf Rock, 14°48′38″N 61°00′27″W
- Table du Diable, 14°46′31″N 60°52′20″W
- Trou Terre Island, 14°41′06″N 60°56′07″W

=== Saint Barthélemy ===
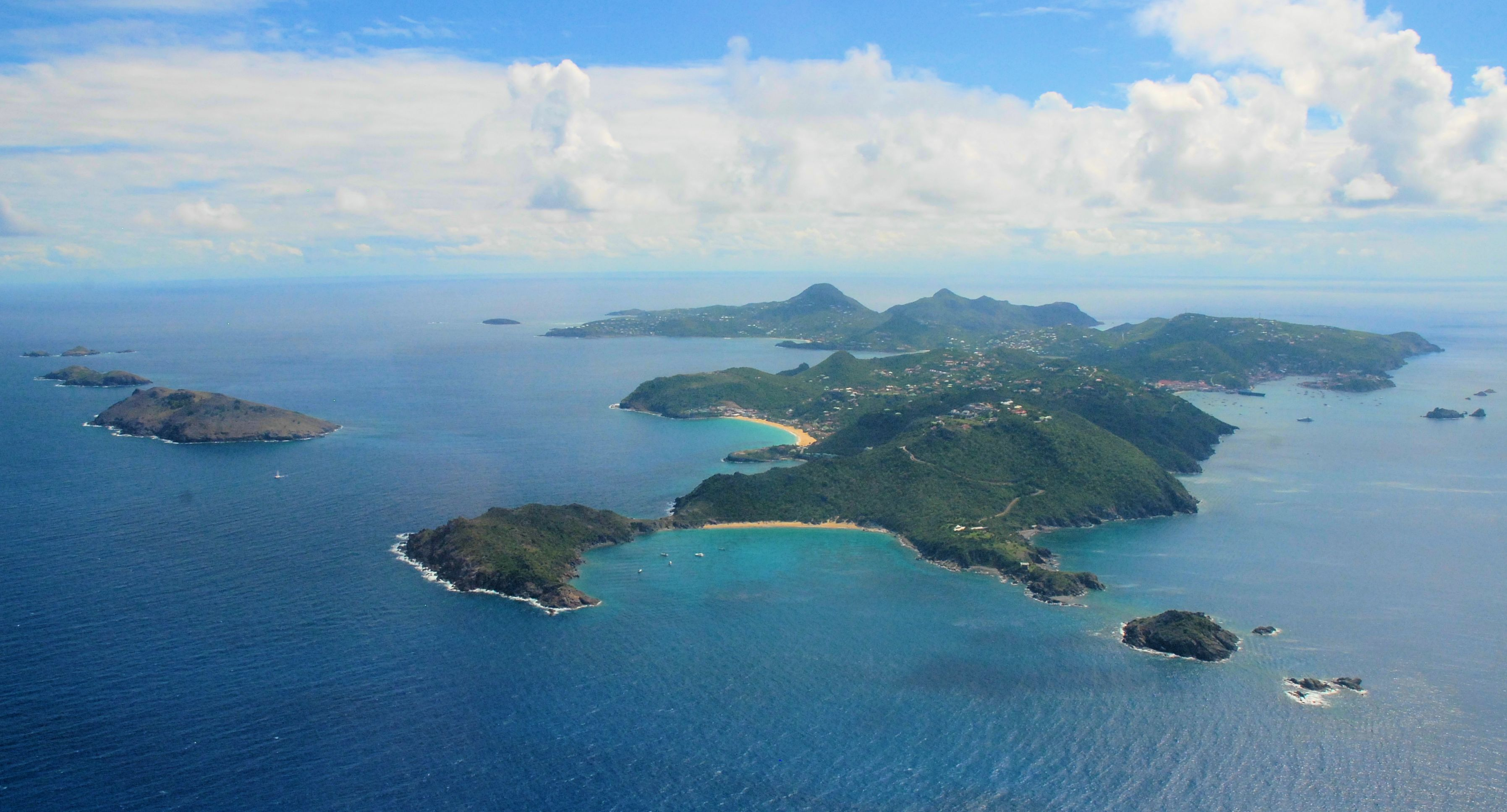
View of St. Barthélemy

There are 18 islands in Saint Barthélemy, including the following:

- Île de Boulanger, 17°57′23″N 62°52′04″W
- La Chaloupe, 17°52′40″N 62°50′12″W
- Île Chevreau, 17°56′01″N 62°51′03″W
- Île Coco, 17°52′28″N 62°48′46″W
- Île Fourche (Île Fourchue), 17°57′30″N 62°54′13″W
- Île Frégate, 17°56′22″N 62°50′01″W
- Îles des Grenadins (Rock), 17°55′26″N 62°47′43″W
- Les Gros Îlets, 17°53′59″N 62°51′38″W
- Île du Pain de sucre, 17°53′49″N 62°52′35″W
- Île Pelé, 17°57′21″N 62°52′24″W
- La Petite Islette, 17°57′24″N 62°54′39″W
- Île de la Pointe, 17°55′13″N 62°52′34″W
- Roche le Boeuf, 17°55′48″N 62°53′42″W
- Roche Plate, 17°58′25″N 62°55′34″W
- Saint Barthélemy (also Saint Barts), 17°53′49″N 62°49′50″W
- Île Toc Vers, 17°56′34″N 62°49′06″W
- Îlet au Vent, 17°57′25″N 62°53′48″W
- La Tortue, 17°55′10″N 62°47′52″W

=== Collectivity of Saint Martin ===
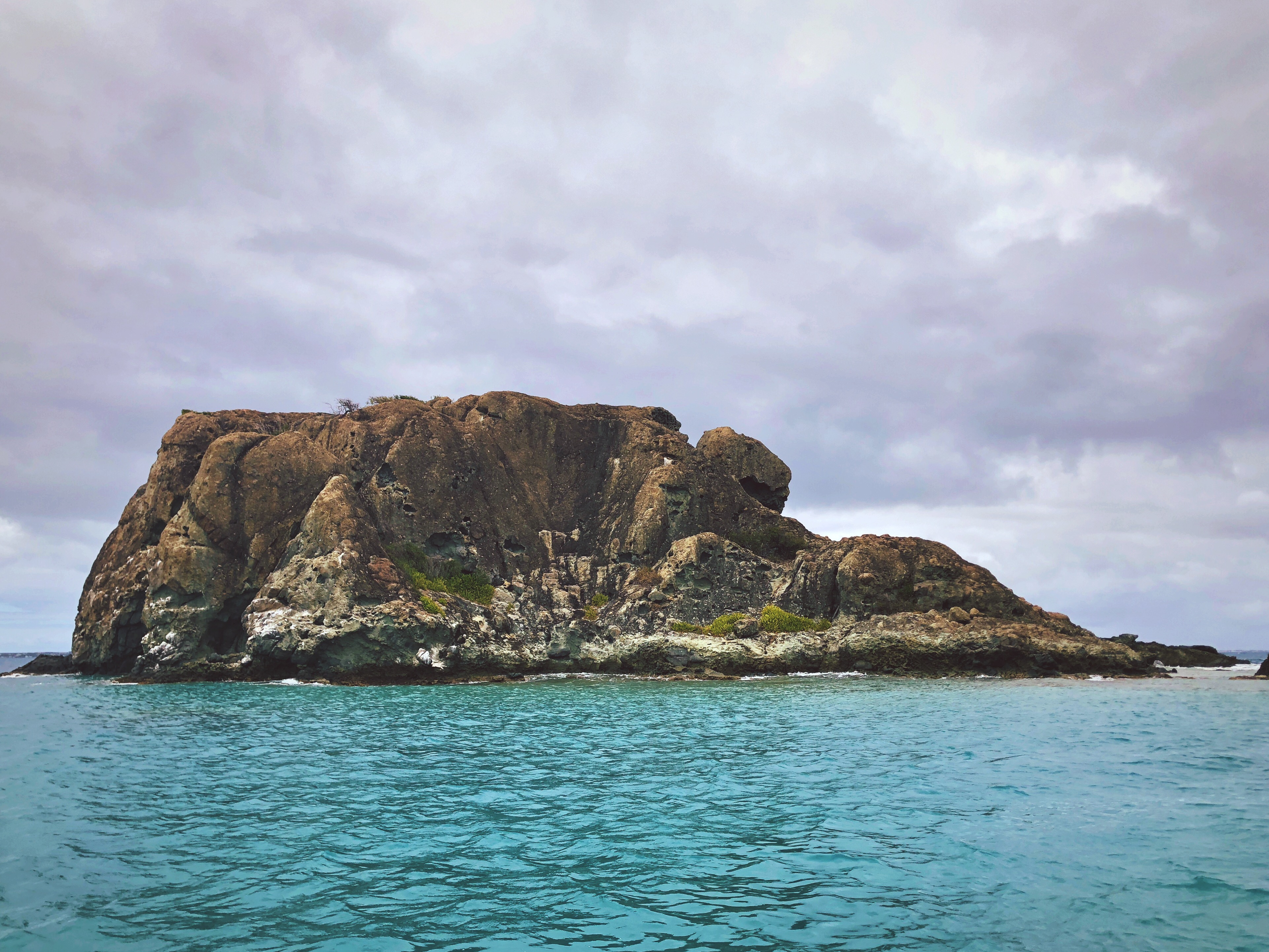
Creole Rock

There are seven islands and two rocks in the French Collectivity of Saint Martin, including:

- Northern part of the island of Saint Martin, 18°04′01″N 63°02′57″W
- Caye Chateau, 18°04′06″N 63°00′39″W
- Caye Verte, 18°05′20″N 63°00′40″W
- Creole Rock (Crowl Rock), 18°07′05″N 63°03′23″W or 18°7′19″N 63°03′19″W
- Grand Îlet, 18°03′02″N 63°06′10″W
- Petite Clef, 18°06′14″N 63°01′09″W
- Pinel Island, 18°06′23″N 63°00′53″W
- Rocher de l'Anse Marcel (rock), 18°07′12″N 63°02′43″W
- Île Tintamarre, 18°07′10″N 62°58′45″W

For islands on the Dutch side of Saint Martin, see §Sint Maarten.

== Grenada ==
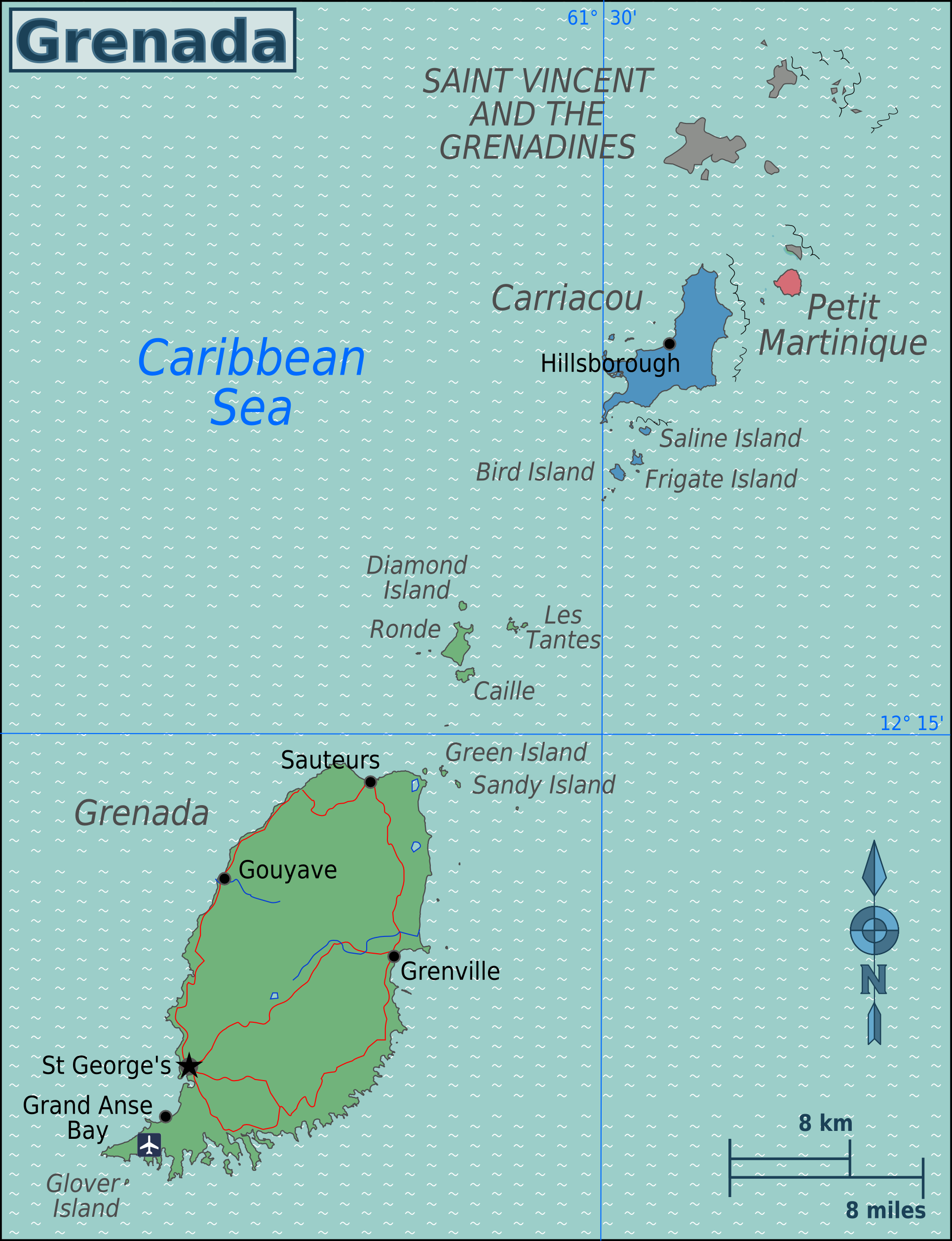
Grenada, Carriacou, Saint Vincent and the Grenadines

There are over 600 islands and islets in Grenada and the Grenadines. The notable islands in Grenada include:

- Calivigny Island, 11°59′40″N 61°43′35″W
- Caille Island, 12°17′15″N 61°34′53″W
- Carriacou, 12°28′24″N 61°27′15″W
- Diamond Island, 12°19′40″N 61°34′59″W
- Fota Island, 12°30′53″N 61°23′59″W
- Frigate Island, 12°24′51″N 61°28′39″W
- Glover Island (Ramier Island), 11°59′13″N 61°47′11″W
- Green Island, 12°13′44″N 61°35′41″W
- Grenada, 12°07′01″N 61°40′43″W
- Hog Island, 12°00′00″N 61°44′17″W
- Hope Island (Bacolet Island), 12°04′10″N 61°37′23″W
- Jack Adam Island, 12°29′44″N 61°28′01″W
- Large Island, 12°24′21″N 61°29′19″W
- Levera Island (Sugar Loaf Island), 12°13′48″N 61°36′22″W
- Mabouya Island, 12°29′11″N 61°29′34″W
- Marquis Island (Soubisse Island), 12°05′59″N 61°37′04″W
- Mushroom Island, 12°25′54″N 61°29′36″W
- Pearls Rock, 12°09′13″N 61°35′54″W
- Petite Dominique, 12°30′30″N 61°24′07″W
- Petite Martinique, 12°31′08″N 61°23′06″W
- Carriacou and Petite Martinique, 12°31′08″N 61°23′06″W
- Ronde Island, 12°18′15″N 61°35′09″W
- Saline Island, 12°25′50″N 61°28′20″W
- Sandy Island, 12°13′20″N 61°35′10″W
- White Island, 12°26′03″N 61°28′53″W

== Haiti ==
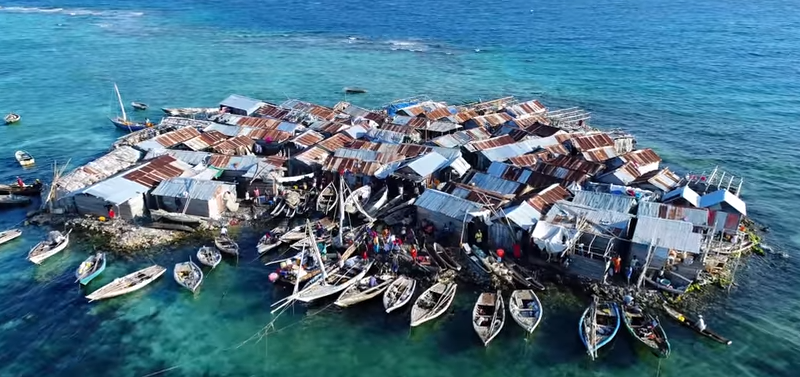
Caye Sable with a population of 250 in 0.16 hectares

The most densely populated island in the world is Ilet a Brouee in Haiti, at 500 persons in its area of .004 km^{2} (0.0015 sq mi). There are about 59 islands in Haiti, including the following:

- Caye Sable, 18°42′0″N 72°46′0.01″W
- Gonâve Island, 18°50′29″N 73°02′14″W
- Grosse Caye, 18°13′24″N 73°23′56″W
- Hispaniola (Eastern part), 19°N 71°W
- Ilet a Brouee, 18°07′42″N 73°35′26″W
- Île-à-Vache (Cow Island), 18°04′20″N 73°38′20″W
- Isle Cacique, 18°41′42″N 72°22′45″W
- Les Cayemites
  - Grand Cayemite, 18°36′53″N 73°45′09″W
  - Petite Cayemite, 18°36′36″N 73°48′30″W
- Navassa Island (claimed by both Haiti and the United States), 18°24′11″N 75°00′43″W
- Tortuga Island (Turtle Island), 20°03′20″N 72°47′33″W

== Honduras ==
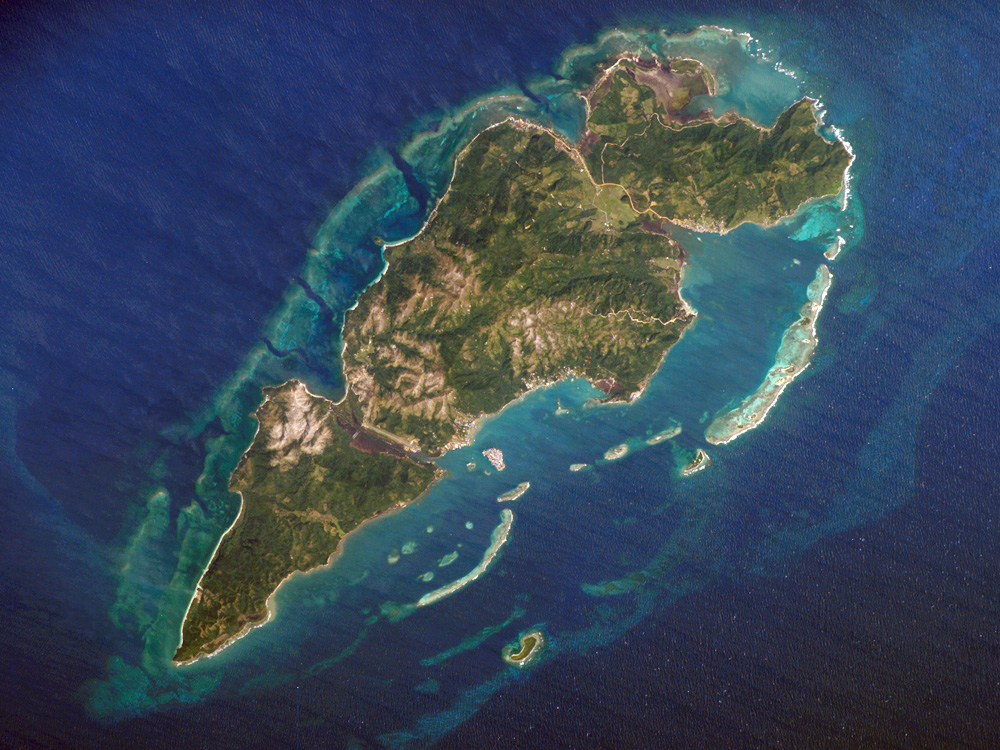
Guanaja

There are at least 99 islands in Honduras, including the following Caribbean islands:

- Cayos Cochinos (Islas de la Bahía, also called Hog Islands), 15°58′00″N 86°28′00″W
- Cayo Gorda, 15°51′30″N 82°24′00″W
- Islas de la Bahía, 16°20′00″N 86°30′00″W
  - Cayo Sur, 15°04′00″N 82°30′00″W
  - Guanaja, 16°30′00″N 85°55′00″W
  - Roatán (Isla Roatan), 16°22′20″N 86°25′41″W
  - Utila, 16°06′00″N 86°56′00″W
- Swan Islands
  - Isla Grande, 17°24′32″N 83°55′57″W
  - Little Swan Island (Isla Pequeña), 17°24′43″N 83°53′56″W
- Misteriosa Bank
- Rosario Bank

== Jamaica ==
There are about 49 islands in the island nation of Jamaica, including the following islands:

- Bajo Nuevo Bank (uninhabited), 18°00′00″N 78°05′00″W
- Great Goat Island, 17°52′13″N 77°03′03″W
- Jamaica, 18°10′38″N 77°22′16″W
- Lime Cay, 17°55′06″N 76°49′11″W
- Little Goat Island, 17°53′07″N 77°04′02″W
- Morant Cays, 17°24′00″N 75°59′00″W
- Navy Island, 18°11′13″N 76°27′10″W
- Pedro Cays, 17°00′00″N 77°50′00″W
- Port Royal Cays (uninhabited), 17°53′50″N 76°48′03″W
- Sandals Royal Caribbean Resort & Offshore Island, 18°30′01″N 77°55′23″W

== Kingdom of the Netherlands ==
The Antillean islands in the island countries (Aruba, Curaçao, Sint Maarten) and special municipalities (Bonaire, Sint Eustatius, and Saba) of the Kingdom of the Netherlands are listed below. Collectively, these islands were formerly considered the Netherlands Antilles, and still are often referenced as the Dutch Caribbean.

=== Aruba ===
There are at least five islands in Aruba:

- Aruba, 12°30′46″N 69°58′30″W
- Indiaanskop, 12°25′7″N 69°53′50″W
- Key Cay
- Long Cay
- Renaissance Island, 12°30′3″N 70°1′43″W

=== Curaçao ===
There are at least seven islands in Curaçao, including:

- Curaçao, 12°10′54″N 68°59′32″W
- Kadoesjie, 12°07′00″N 68°55′00″W
- Klein Curaçao, 11°59′28″N 68°38′35″W
- Eiland Penso, 12°04′38″N 68°51′24″W
- Isla Makuaku, 12°07′00″N 68°48′00″W
- Kadoesji, Curaçao, 12°07′00″N 68°55′00″W
- Sapaté Eiland, 12°06′46″N 68°54′32″W

=== Sint Maarten ===
Sint Maarten Map

There are ten total islands of Sint Maarten, including:

- Saint Martin (southern part), 18°02′30″N 63°04′00″W
- Cow and Calf Island, 18°01′22″N 63°00′44″W
- Guana Key of Pelikan (Guana Cay), 18°01′05″N 63°01′09″W
- Hen and Chicken, 18°N 63°W
- Little Key, 18°03′02″N 63°06′35″W
- Mal Aborder, 18°1′0″N 63°0′0″W
- Mollibeday Rots (Molly Beday Rock), 18°01′26″N 62°59′58″W
- Mona Island, 18°02′00″N 63°07′00″W
- Pelikan Rock, Sint Maarten (Pelican Island), 18°01′49″N 63°05′54″W
- Pond Island, 18°01′52″N 63°02′41″W
- Snoopy Island, 18°02′10″N 63°05′27″W

For islands on the French side of Saint Martin, see §Collectivity of Saint Martin.

=== Caribbean Netherlands ===
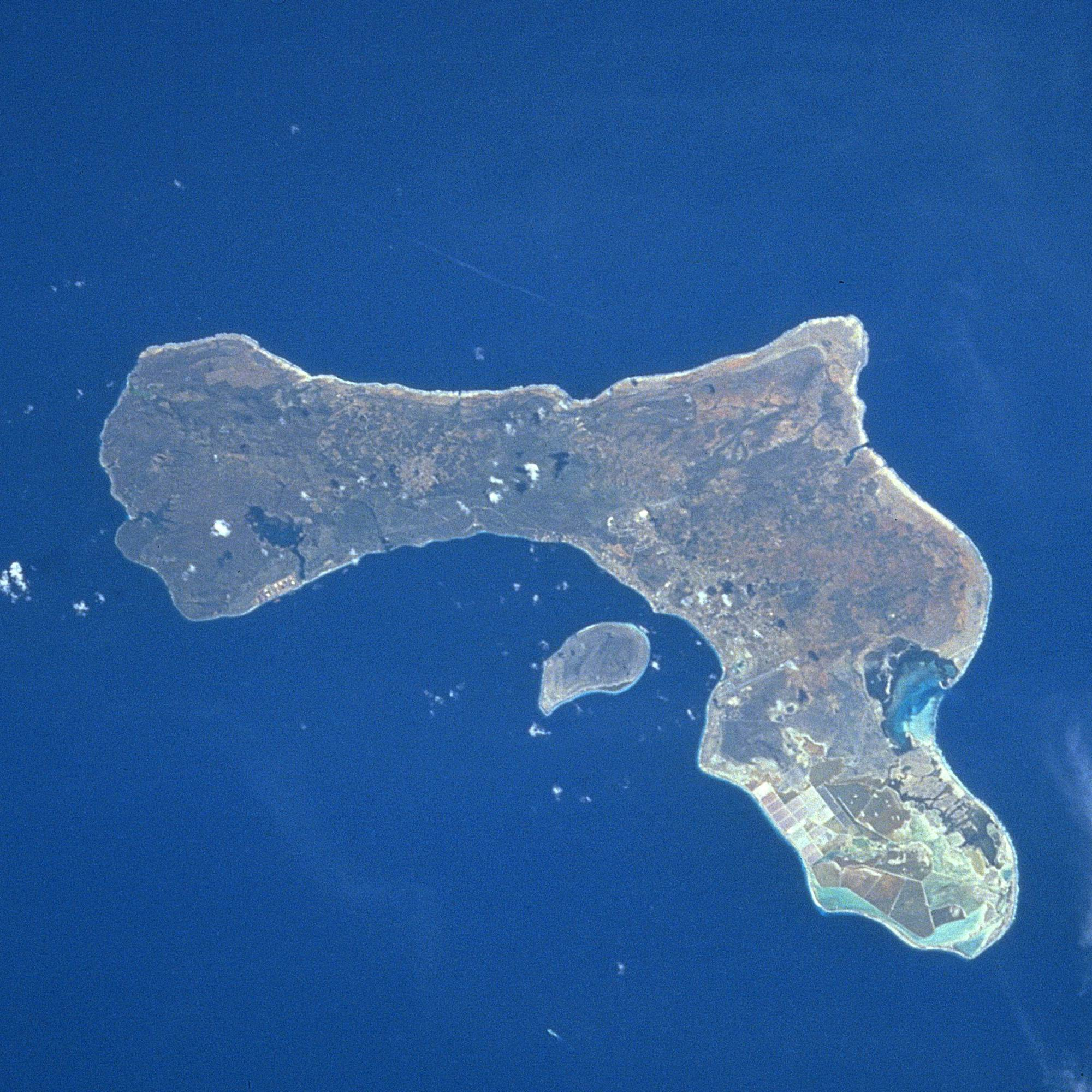
Satellite image of Bonaire and the small island of Klein Bonaire

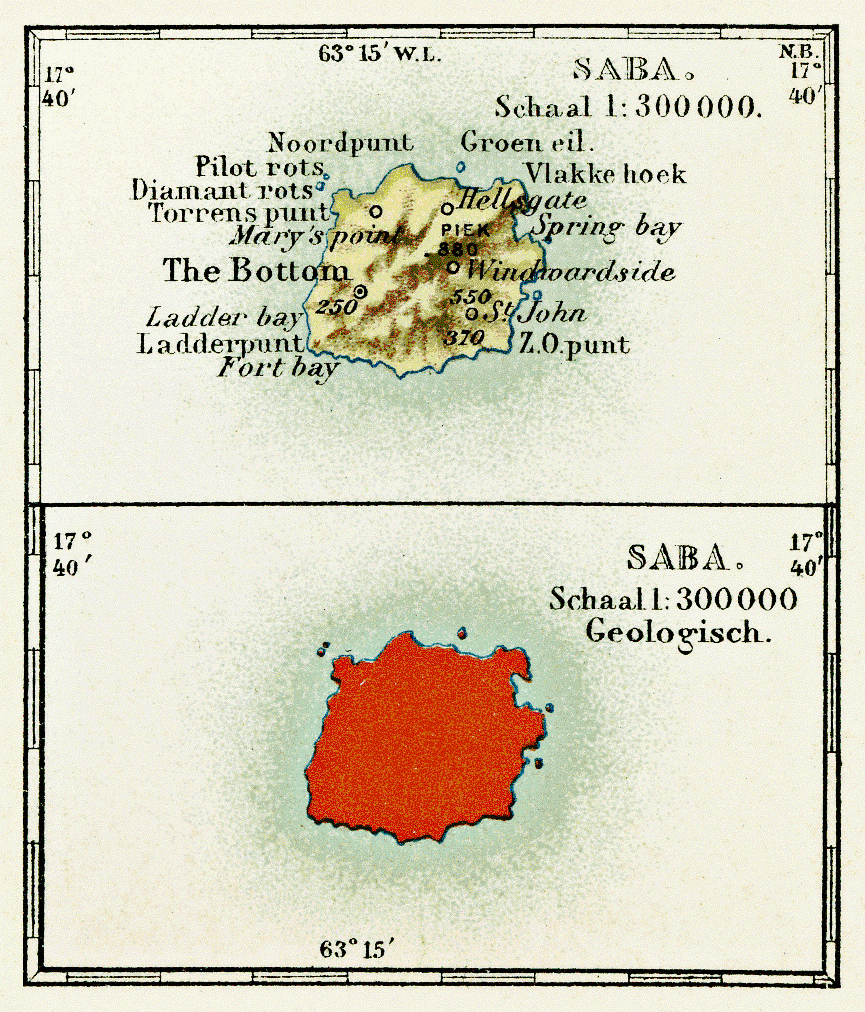
Map of Saba from the Encyclopaedie van Nederlandsch West-Indië 1914–1917

- Bonaire (special municipality of the Netherlands):
  - Bonaire, 12°11′28″N 68°15′24″W
  - Eiland Ranch, Bonaire, 12°07′00″N 68°14′00″W
  - Klein Bonaire, Bonaire, 12°09′44″N 68°18′23″W
  - Meeuwtje, 12°04′50″N 68°51′26″W
  - Willemberg, 12°06′00″N 68°51′37″W
  - Camia, 12°18′00″N 68°23′00″W
  - Isla Makuka
- Sint Eustatius (special municipality of the Netherlands), 17°29′27″N 62°58′43″W
- Saba (special municipality of the Netherlands)
  - Saba,17°37′49″N 63°14′26″W
  - Green Island, Saba, 17°38′57″N 63°13′48″W
  - Little Island, Saba, 17°38′00″N 63°13′00″W
  - Pilot Rots (Rocks), 17°39′N 63°15′W

== Mexico ==
There are several islands of Mexico on the Caribbean Sea, including:

- Isla Cancún, 21°05′00″N 86°46′00″W
- Isla Cozumel, 20°27′41″N 86°54′02″W
- Isla Contoy, 21°30′23″N 86°47′54″W
- Isla Holbox, 21°32′16″N 87°13′12″W
- Isla Mujeres, 21°13′55″N 86°43′55″W

== Nicaragua ==
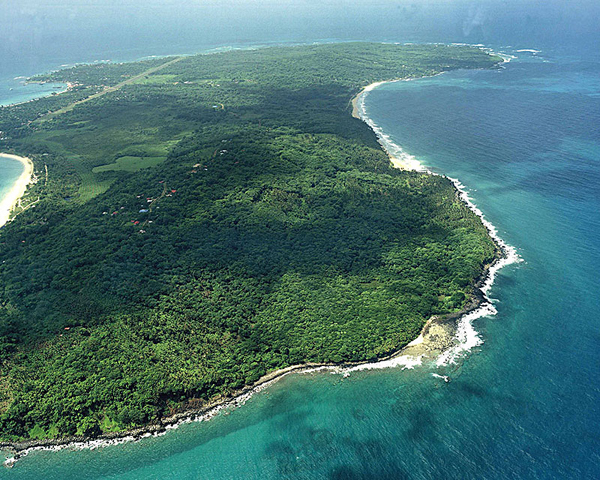
Aerial view of Corn Island

There are over 150 islands in Nicaragua, including the following islands in the Caribbean Sea:

- Corn Island, 12°09′46″N 83°03′50″W
- Little Corn Island, 12°17′22″N 82°58′44″W
- Miskito Cays (reef), 14°22′51″N 82°45′54″W
- Pearl Cays, 12°28′00″N 83°23′00″W
- Calala Island (private island), 12°26′15″N 83°25′56″W
- Pigeon Cay (Cayo de la Paloma), 11°48′07″N 83°39′01″W

== Panama ==
There are several hundreds of islands in Panama, including the following islands in the Caribbean:

- Isla Bastimentos, 9°18′00″N 82°08′00″W
- Cayos Zapatilla, 9°15′N 82°2′W
- Isla Carenero, 9°20′46″N 82°13′54″W
- Isla Cayo Agua, 9°09′00″N 82°02′08″W
- Isla Colón, 9°23′47″N 82°16′25″W
- Isla Cristóbal, 9°21′N 82°14′W
- Isla Popa, 9°10′46″N 82°07′29″W
- Isla Solarte, 9°18′45″N 82°11′19″W
- Isla Escudo de Veraguas, 9°05′49″N 81°33′29″W
- Galeta Island, 9°24.14′N 79°52.33′W
- Isla Cabra, 9°37′31″N 79°34′41″W
- Isla Grande, 9°38′02″N 79°33′45″W
- Corazón de Jesús, 9°26′45″N 78°34′58″W
- Narganá, 9°26′39″N 78°35′06″W
- Soledad Miria, 9°26′42″N 78°53′59.63″W

== Saint Kitts and Nevis ==
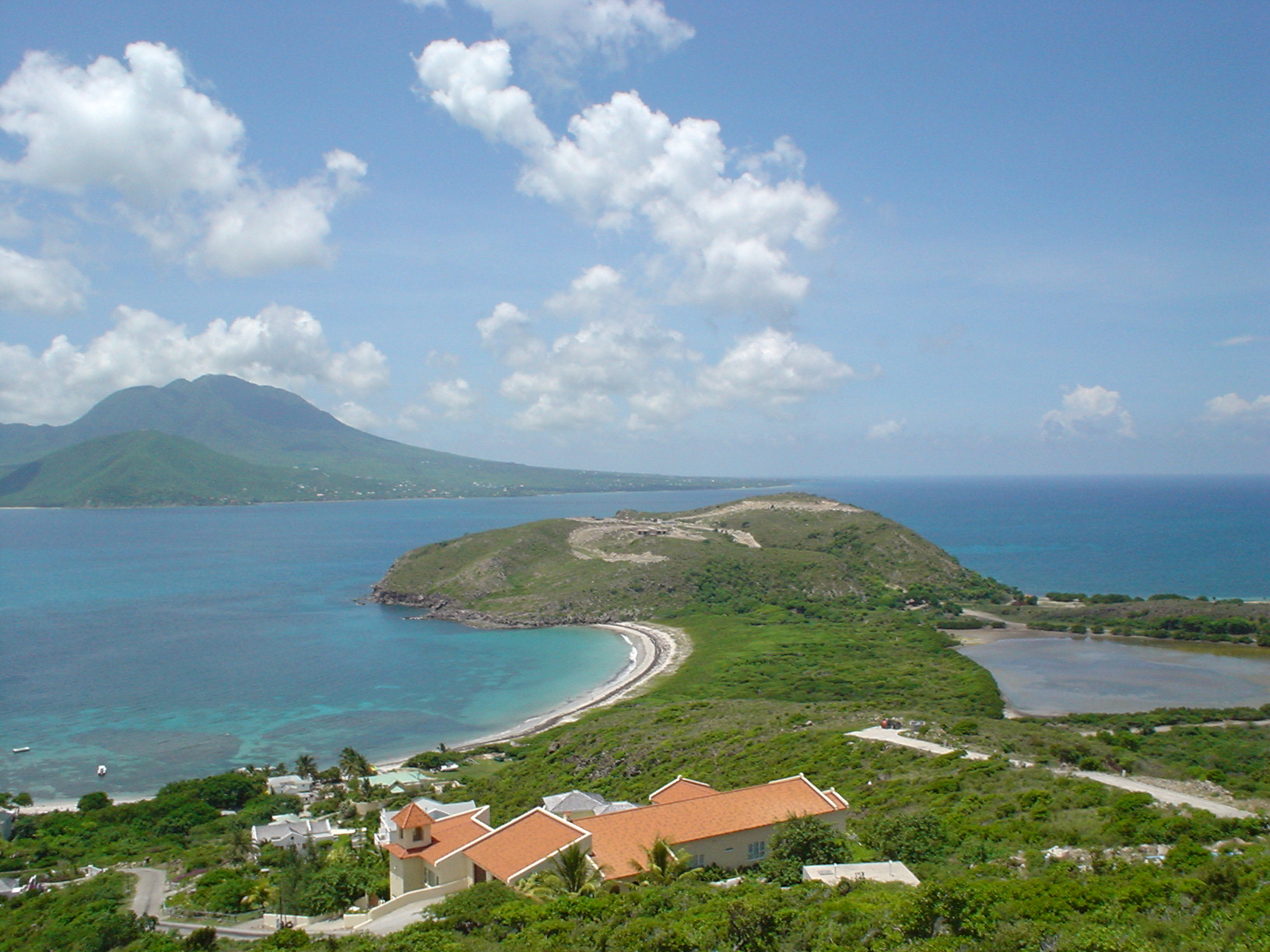
A view of Nevis from the southeastern peninsula of Saint Kitts

There are about 20 islands in Saint Kitts and Nevis, including:

- Booby Island, 17°13′37″N 62°36′38″W
- Crokus Cay
- Dalzel Island
- Dodan Island
- Dulcina Island
- East Cay
- Eden Island
- Fahie Island
- Friars Bay
- Gardner Island
- Garvey Island
- Golden Cay
- Jessop Island
- Maddens
- Meves Island
- Nevis, 17°09′09″N 62°35′12″W
- Otters Island
- Saint Kitts (Saint Christopher), 17°20′00″N 62°45′36″W
- Sugar Loaf
- Vambelle Island

== Saint Lucia ==
There are 15 islands in Saint Lucia, including:

- Barrel o' Beef
- Burgot Rocks
- Dennery Island, 13°54′32″N 60°53′03″W
- Des Bateaux Island, 13°55′01″N 60°52′44″W
- Fous Island, 14°04′55″N 60°54′23″W
- Frigate Island, 13°52′46″N 60°53′00″W
- L'Islet a Ramier
- Liverpool Rocks
- Maria Islands, 13°43′33″N 60°55′52″W
- Pigeon Island, 14°05′34″N 60°57′53″W
- Praslin Island, 13°52′31″N 60°53′23″W
- Rat Island, 14°02′01″N 60°58′54″W
- Rouche Island, 13°57′12″N 60°52′28″W
- Saint Lucia, 13°54′17″N 60°58′05″W
- Scorpion Island, 13°45′56″N 60°55′22″W

== Saint Vincent and the Grenadines ==
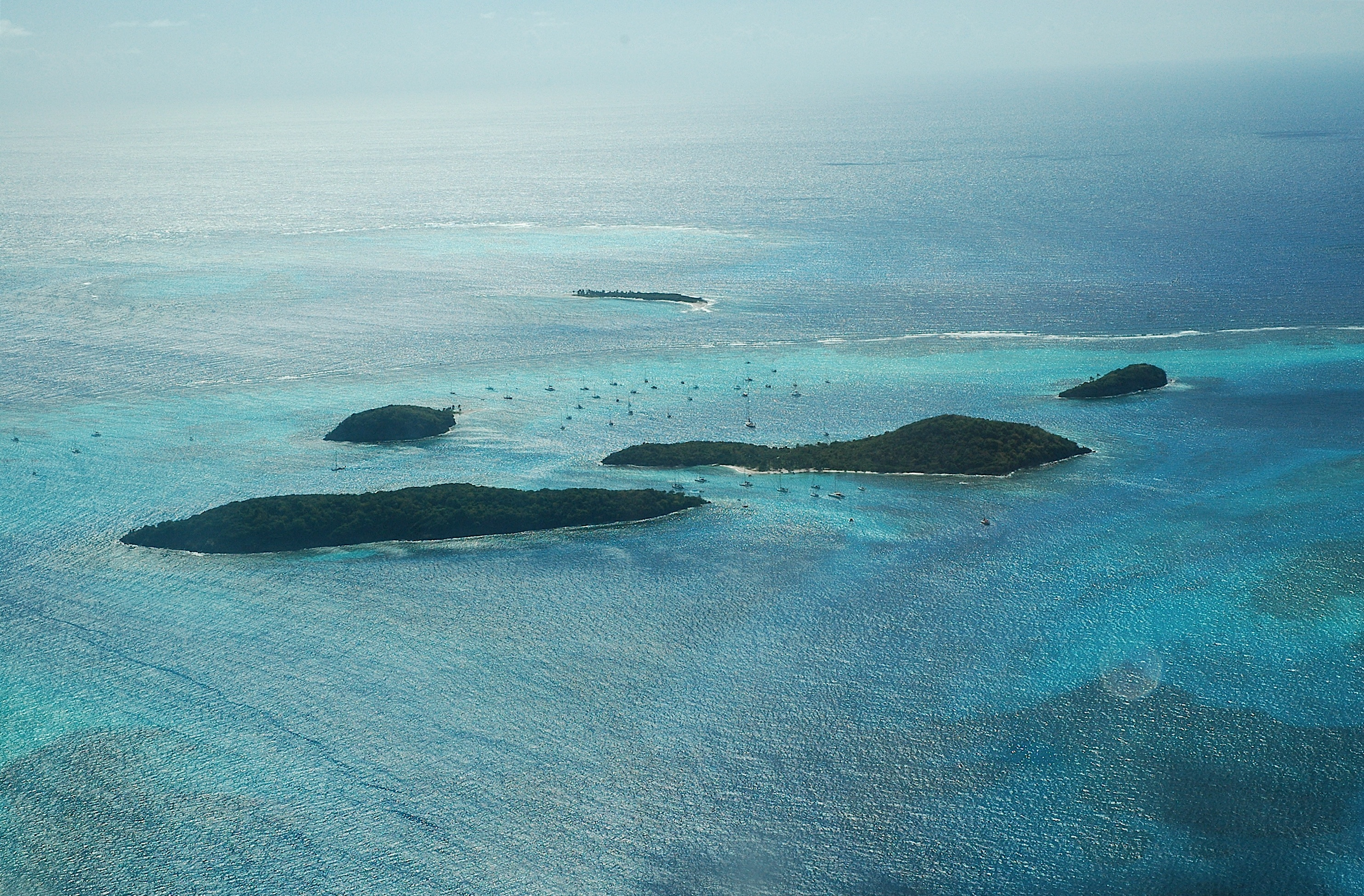
Tobago Cayes

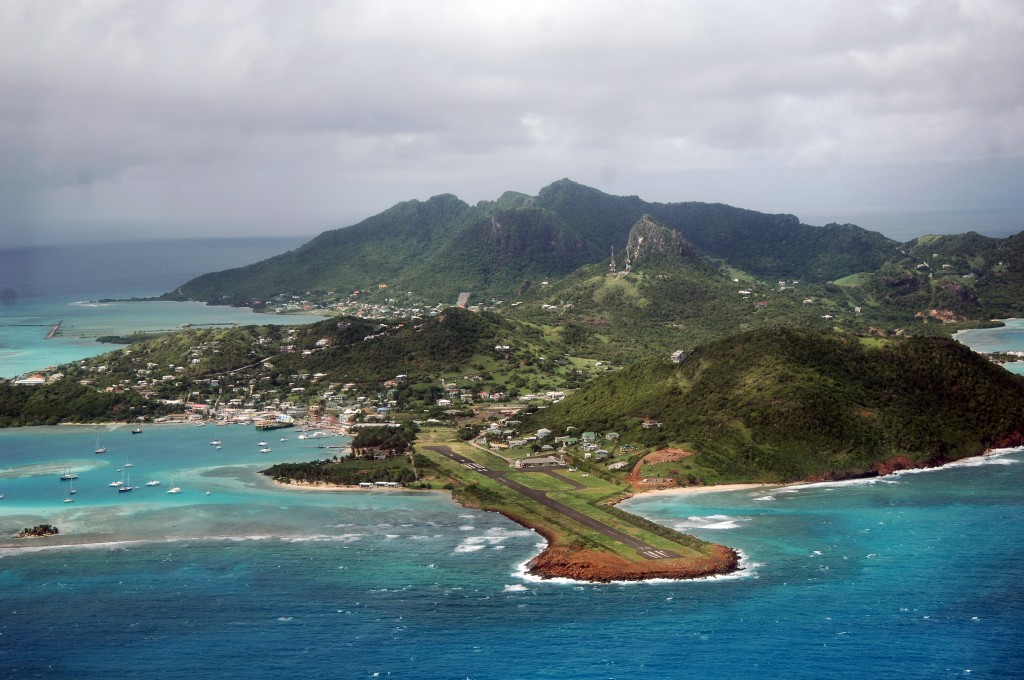
Union Island International Airport

There are about 49 islands in Saint Vincent and the Grenadines, including:

- All Awash Island, 12°55′06″N 61°08′24″W
- Baliceaux Island, 12°56′52″N 61°08′43″W
- Bequia, 13°00′35″N 61°13′45″W
- Bettowia (Battowia), 12°57′44″N 61°07′51″W
- Black Rock
- Brooks Rocks
- Bullet Cay, 12°58′00″N 61°07′39″W
- Cactus Cay
- Canouan Baleine
- Canouan Island, 12°42′58″N 61°19′33″W
- Catholic Island, 12°39′39″N 61°24′05″W
- Chateaubelair Islet, 13°17′53″N 61°14′49″W
- Church Cay, 12°57′16″N 61°08′04″W
- Cow And Calves Islands
- Dike Island, 13°08′00″N 61°12′54″W
- Double Rock
- Dove Cay, 12°41′23″N 61°21′03″W
- Dove Island, 13°08′05″N 61°12′21″W
- Ellen Rock
- Fort Duvernette Island (Duvernette Islet), 13°08′00″N 61°13′00″W
- Frigate Island, 12°34′48″N 61°26′12″W
- L'Islot, 12°41′34″N 61°20′56″W
- Litte Savan, 12°48′11″N 61°12′57″W
- Mayreau, 12°38′25″N 61°23′29″W
- Middle Cay (St. Elairs Cay), 12°58′50″N 61°14′28″W
- Milligan Cay, 13°07′32″N 61°09′52″W
- Mopion Islet
- Mustique, 12°52′38″N 61°10′59″W
- Palm Island (Prune Island), 12°35′10″N 61°23′50″W
- Pelican Cay
- Petit Canouan, 12°47′32″N 61°16′47″W
- Petit Cay, 12°50′50″N 61°11′52″W
- Petit Mustique, 12°50′20″N 61°11′40″W
- Petit Nevis, 12°58′25″N 61°14′36″W
- Petit Saint Vincent, 12°32′14″N 61°23′01″W
- Petit Tabac
- Pigeon Island, 12°56′50″N 61°16′29″W
- Pillories
  - Big Pillory, 12°54′44″N 61°10′22″W
  - Middle Pillory, 12°54′34″N 61°10′40″W
  - Little Pillory, 12°54′32″N 61°10′52″W
- Punaise
- Isle à Quatre, 12°57′17″N 61°15′19″W
- Rabbit Island, 12°52′00″N 61°10′30″W
- Red Island, 12°36′06″N 61°24′31″W
- Saint Elairs Cay, 12°58′50″N 61°14′28″W
- Saint Vincent, 13°15′13″N 61°11′03″W
- Sand Cay
- Savan, 12°48′25″N 61°12′38″W
- Savan Rock (Little Savan), 12°48′11″N 61°12′57″W
- Semplars Cay
- Tobago Cays, 12°38′02″N 61°21′26″W
  - Petit Rameau, 12°38′16″N 61°21′33″W
  - Petit Bateau, 12°38′01″N 61°21′39″W
  - Petit Tobac, 12°37′22″N 61°20′55″W
  - Jamesby, 12°37′43″N 61°21′38″W
  - Baradal, 12°38′04″N 61°21′18″W
- Syrup Cay
- Union Island, 12°36′03″N 61°26′08″W
- West Cay
- Wilks Island
- Young Island, 13°07′50″N 61°12′10″W

== United Kingdom ==
The following is a list of islands of current island nations of the British Overseas Territories that are in the Caribbean.

=== Anguilla ===
There are about 19 islands in Anguilla, including:

- Anguillita, 18°12′55″N 63°02′55″W
- Dog Island, 18°16′38″N 63°15′12″W
- East Cay, 18°17′06″N 63°14′11″W
- Little Island, 18°14′20″N 62°58′49″W
- Little Scrub Island, 18°17′51″N 62°57′20″W
- Mid Cay, 18°17′13″N 63°15′40″W
- North Cay
- Prickly Pear Cays, 18°16′00″N 63°11′00″W
- Rabbit Island
- Sandy Island, 18°12′44″N 63°07′06″W
- Scilly Cay, 18°15′37″N 63°00′07″W
- Scrub Island, 18°17′26″N 62°56′32″W
- Seal Island, 18°16′06″N 63°08′55″W
- Sombrero (Hat Island), 18°35′24″N 63°25′33″W
- South Weneger Island
- West Cay, 18°16′38″N 63°16′30″W

=== British Virgin Islands ===
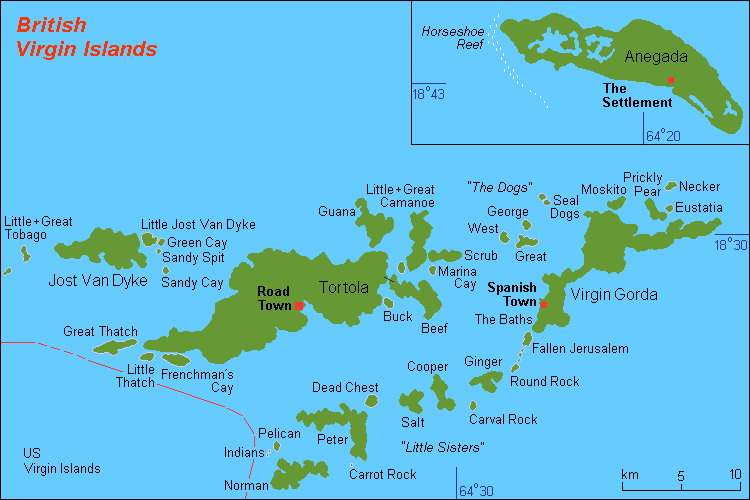
Map of British Virgin Islands

There are about 51 islands in the British Virgin Islands (16 inhabited), including:

- Anegada, 18°43′53″N 64°19′43″W
- Beef Island, 18°26′30″N 64°31′47″W
- Bellamy Cay, 18°26′53″N 64°31′58″W
- Broken Jerusalem (Rocks), 18°24′32″N 64°27′17″W
- Buck Island, 18°25′27″N 64°33′30″W
- Carvel Rock, 18°18′32″N 64°37′42″W
- Cockroach Island, 18°29′41″N 64°27′49″W
- Cooper Island, 18°22′43″N 64°30′36″W
- Dead Chest, 18°21′56″N 64°33′47″W
- East Seal Dog Island, 18.50671°N 64.43241°W
- Eustatia Island, 18°30′38″N 64°21′30″W
- Fallen Jerusalem Island, 18°25′04″N 64°27′04″W
- Frenchman's Cay, 18°22′59″N 64°41′58″W
- George Dog Island, 18°29′33″N 64°27′25″W
- Ginger Island, 18°23′18″N 64°28′39″W
- Great Camanoe, 18°43′40″N 64°19′43″W
- Great Dog Island, 18°28′56″N 64°27′25″W
- Great Thatch, 18°23′10″N 64°44′22″W
- Great Tobago Island, 18°26′43″N 64°49′30″W
- Green Cay, 18°27′13″N 64°42′31″W
- Guana Island, 18°28′26″N 64°34′01″W
- Jost Van Dyke, 18°26′55″N 64°44′37″W
- Little Camanoe, 18°27′29″N 64°32′34″W
- Little Jost Van Dyke, 18°27′16″N 64°43′14″W
- Little Seal Dog Island
- Little Thatch, 18°22′54″N 64°42′52″W
- Marina Cay, 18°27′40″N 64°31′31″W
- Mosquito Island, 18°30′38″N 64°23′40″W
- Mosquito Rock, 18°31′03″N 64°23′20″W
- Nanny Cay (land-tied),18°23′56″N 64°38′02″W
- Necker Island, 18°31′37″N 64°21′30″W
- Norman Island, 18°19′05″N 64°36′33″W
- Pelican Island, 18°19′58″N 64°37′33″W
- Peter Island, 18°21′15″N 64°34′44″W
- Prickly Pear Island, 18°30′26″N 64°22′04″W
- Red Rock, 18°26′11″N 64°33′36″W
- Round Rock, 18°23′55″N 64°27′28″W
- Saba Rock, 18°30′11″N 64°21′28″W
- Salt Island, 18°22′21″N 64°31′37″W
- Sandy Cay, 18°26′10″N 64°42′35″W
- Sandy Spit, 18°26′59″N 64°42′32″W
- Scrub Island, 18°28′06″N 64°30′45″W
- Tortola (largest island), 18°26′12″N 64°37′07″W
- The Indians (rock), 18°19′57″N 64°37′44″W
- Virgin Gorda, 18°27′43″N 64°25′35″W
- West Seal Dog Island, 18°30′24″N 64°26′05″W
- West Dog Island, 18°28′58″N 64°28′22″W
- Whale Rocks, 18°26′11″N 64°31′41″W

=== Cayman Islands ===
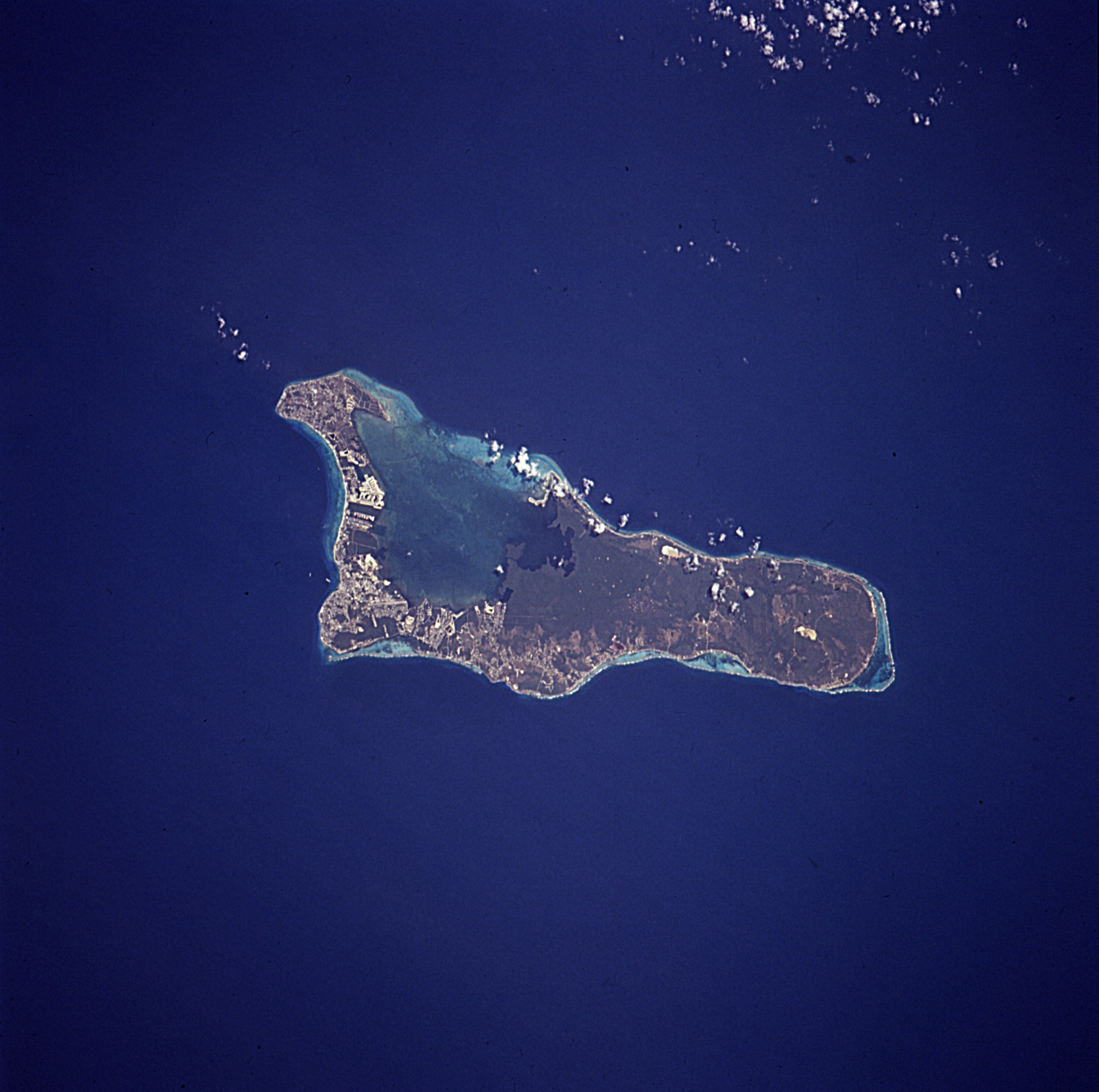
Grand Cayman Island from space

The following are the islands of the Cayman Islands:

- Cayman Brac, 19°43′00″N 79°49′00″W
  - Little Cayman Brac, 19°45′00″N 79°44′00″W
  - First Cay
- Grand Cayman (largest island), 19°19′22″N 81°14′55″W
  - Barkers Cay
  - Booby Cay, 19°20′00″N 81°18′00″W
  - Duck Pond Cay, 19°18′N 81°18′W
  - Finger Cay/Dike (now absorbed into Grand Cayman), 19°21′00″N 81°16′00″W
  - Sand Cay, 19°15′47″N 81°23′11″W
  - Water Cay (Point, now absorbed into Grand Cayman), 19°21′00″N 81°17′00″W
- Little Cayman, 19°41′00″N 80°03′00″W
  - Owen Island, 19°39′59″N 80°03′45″W
- Bessy Howard Cay, 19°45′00″N 79°43′00″W
- Vidal Cay, 19°23′00″N 81°21′00″W

=== Montserrat ===
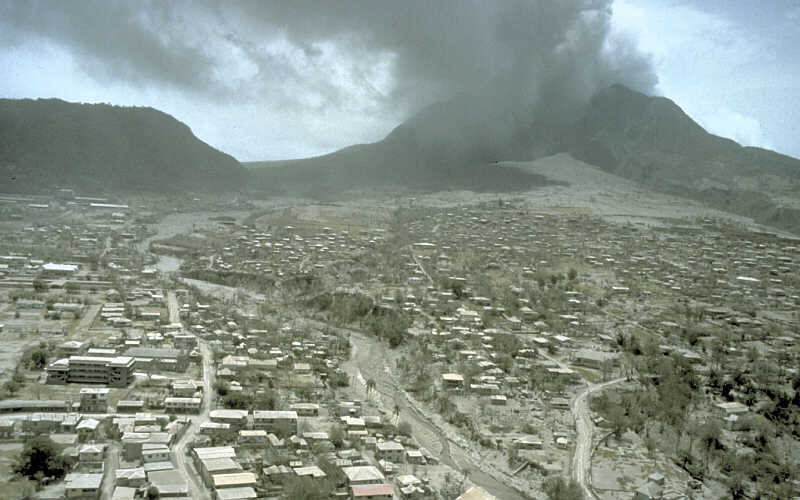
Aftermath in town of Plymouth in 1997 of volcanic eruption that began on Montserrat in 1995

There are only a few islands in Montserrat, including:

- Montserrat (Largest island), 16°44′25″N 62°11′23″W
- Little Redonda and Virgin, 16°49′00″N 62°11′00″W
- Statue Rock, 16°46′40″N 62°10′11″W

=== Turks and Caicos Islands ===
The British Overseas Territory of the Turks and Caicos Islands is located in the Lucayan Archipelago, the portion of the Caribbean region in the North Atlantic Ocean rather than in or bordering the Caribbean Sea. There are about 75 islands and land-tied islands in Turks and Caicos Islands, including the following notable islands:

- Big Ambergris Cay, 21°18′09″N 71°37′57″W
- Bird Island (Pear Cay), 21°22′22″N 71°05′22″W
- East Caicos, 21°41′04″N 71°30′28″W
- Grand Turk, 21°28′07″N 71°08′21″W
- Little Ambergris Cay, 21°17′49″N 71°41′38″W
- Mangrove Cay, 21°49′27″N 72°08′30″W
- Middle Caicos, 21°47′51″N 71°43′40″W
- North Caicos, 21°54′18″N 71°57′19″W
- Parrot Cay, 21°55′10″N 72°03′34″W
- Pear Cay, 21°11′00″N 71°41′00″W
- Providenciales Island, 21°46′50″N 72°14′44″W
- Salt Cay, 21°19′36″N 71°12′22″W
- South Caicos, 21°30′28″N 71°31′14″W
- West Caicos, 21°40′17″N 72°27′22″W

== United States ==
The following are islands of the United States in the Caribbean:

- Navassa Island
- Serranilla Bank
- Bajo Nuevo Bank

The following sections show islands of island territories of the United States in the Caribbean.

=== Puerto Rico ===
There are about 142 islands in Puerto Rico, including:

- Alcarraza, 18°21′40″N 65°22′09″W
- Bajo Evelyn (Evelyn Shoal), 18°09′14″N 65°44′31″W
- Cabeza de Perro, 18°14′54″N 65°34′40″W
- Cayo Ahogado, 18°19′21″N 65°37′10″W
- Cayo Alfeñique, 17°55′37″N 66°21′07″W
- Cayo Algodones, 18°11′34″N 65°41′01″W
- Cayo Arenas, 17°57′35″N 66°40′27″W
- Cayo Ballena, 18°20′51″N 65°14′13″W
- Cayo Batata, 18°06′56″N 65°46′17″W
- Cayo Bayo, 17°58′17″N 67°03′40″W
- Cayo Berberia, 17°55′43″N 66°27′25″W
- Cayo Botella, 18°19′30″N 65°14′27″W
- Cayo Cabritas, 18°13′15″N 65°36′06″W
- Cayo Caracoles, 17°57′36″N 67°02′18″W
- Cayo Caribe, 17°58′12″N 66°43′58″W
- Cayo Chiva, 18°06′21″N 65°24′58″W
- Cayo Collado, 17°57′45″N 67°02′08″W
- Cayo Corral, 17°56′09″N 67°01′10″W
- Cayo Diablo, Fajardo, 18°21′45″N 65°31′53″W
- Cayo Diable, Vieques, 18°07′20″N 65°18′29″W
- Cayo Don Luis, 17°56′38″N 66°58′18″W
- Cayo Enrique, 17°57′12″N 67°02′48″W
- Cayo Fanduca, 18°05′13″N 67°12′54″W
- Cayo Icacos, 18°23′11″N 65°35′20″W
- Cayo Jalova, 18°07′07″N 65°21′32″W
- Cayo Jalovita, 18°06′57″N 65°21′17″W
- Cayo Largo (Largo Shoals), 18°18′55″N 65°34′43″W
- Cayo Lobito, 18°20′03″N 65°23′34″W
- Cayo Lobo, 18°19′28″N 65°22′39″W
- Cayo Lobos, 18°22′39″N 65°34′12″W
- Cayo Maria Langa, 17°57′56″N 66°45′01″W
- Cayo Mata - Guayanilla municipality, 17°59′21″N 66°45′49″W
- Cayo Mata - Salinas municipality, 17°57′11″N 66°17′40″W
- Cayo Mata Seca, 17°57′40″N 67°00′34″W
- Cayo Matojo, 18°20′11″N 65°17′24″W
- Cayo Morrillo, 17°55′37″N 66°16′23″W
- Cayo Norte, 18°20′13″N 65°15′24″W
- Cayo Palomas, 17°58′29″N 66°44′56″W
- Cayo Parguera, 17°58′43″N 66°43′03″W
- Cayo Piñerito, 18°14′42″N 65°35′41″W
- Cayo Pirata, 18°18′23″N 65°17′44″W
- Cayo Puerca, 17°55′46″N 66°14′13″W
- Cayo Ratón, 18°18′51″N 65°21′12″W
- Cayo Ratones - Fajardo municipality, 18°22′57″N 65°34′49″W
- Cayo Real, 18°05′19″N 65°28′22″W
- Cayo Rio, 17°58′57″N 66°44′17″W
- Cayo Santiago, 18°09′23″N 65°44′03″W
- Cayo Sombrerito, 18°20′16″N 65°14′44″W
- Cayo Terremoto, 17°55′48″N 66°58′21″W
- Cayo Tiburón, 18°20′42″N 65°14′17″W
- Cayo Tuna, 18°20′15″N 65°23′35″W
- Cayo Verde, 18°18′25″N 65°17′26″W
- Cayo Vieques, 18°07′41″N 65°26′01″W
- Cayo Yerba, 18°19′08″N 65°21′14″W
- Cayo Luis Peña, 18°18′23″N 65°19′59″W
- Cayo de Tierra, 18°05′20″N 65°28′02″W
- Cayo del Agua, 18°18′40″N 65°20′51″W
- Cayo del Agua, 18°18′43″N 65°20′52″W
- Cayos Cabezazos, 17°55′18″N 66°22′59″W
- Cayos Caribes, 17°55′38″N 66°12′44″W
- Cayos de Barca, 17°54′59″N 66°14′23″W
- Cayos de Caña Gorda, 17°56′32″N 66°52′17″W
- Cayos de Caracoles, 17°55′42″N 66°21′59″W
- Cayos de Pájaros, 17°55′24″N 66°15′40″W
- Cayos de Ratones, 17°56′06″N 66°17′34″W
- Cayos Geniqui, 18°20′18″N 65°13′54″W
- El Ancón, 18°21′06″N 65°20′35″W
- El Mono, 18°19′04″N 65°22′06″W
- Isla Caja de Muertos, 17°53′41″N 66°31′12″W
- Gata Islets, 17°58′00″N 66°37′00″W
- Isla Culebrita, 18°18′53″N 65°13′44″W
- Isla de Cardona, 17°57′26″N 66°38′06″W
- Isla de Culebra, 18°18′53″N 65°16′59″W
- Isla del Erio
- Isla Cabras, 18°12′44″N 65°36′09″W
- Isla Chiva, 18°06′26″N 65°23′03″W
- Isla Cueva, 17°57′44″N 67°04′49″W
- Isla de Cerro Gordo, 18°29′11″N 66°20′56″W
- Isla de Cabras, 18°12′44″N 65°36′09″W
- Isla de las Palomas, 17°58′29″N 66°44′56″W
- Isla de Ramos, 18°18′46″N 65°36′35″W
- Isla Desecheo, 18°23′20″N 67°28′30″W - Mayagüez municipality
- Isla Guachinanga, 18°25′48″N 66°02′08″W
- Isla Guayacán, 17°57′27″N 67°05′25″W
- Isla La Cancora, 18°27′57″N 65°59′51″W
- Isla Magueyes, 17°58′08″N 67°02′39″W
- Isla Matei, 17°58′04″N 67°00′28″W
- Isla de Mona, 18°04′53″N 67°53′29″W
- Isla Mata la Gata, 17°57′36.0″N 67°02′17.7″W
- Isla Monito, 18°09′41″N 67°56′59″W
- Isla Morrillito, 17°52′56″N 66°32′00″W
- Isla Palominitos, 18°20′20″N 65°34′02″W
- Isla Piedra
- Isla Puerca
- Isla San Juan
- Isla Yallis
- Isletas de Garzas
- Islote de Juan Perez
- Isla de Mona - Mayagüez municipality
- Isla de Ratones, Ponce
- Isla de Ratones (Cabo Rojo municipality)
- Isla de Vieques
- Isla Monito - Mayagüez municipality
- Islote Numero dos
- Isla Palominitos, 18°20′20″N 65°34′02″W
- Isla Palominos, 18°20′55″N 65°34′05″W
- Isla Piñeros, 18°15′08″N 65°35′29″W
- La Blanquilla
- La Cordillera
- Las Cabritas
- Las Cucarachas
- Las Hermanas
- Las Lavanderas del Este
- Las Lavanderas del Oeste
- Los Farallones
- Los Gemelos
- Los Negritos
- Mata Redonda
- Pela
- Pelaita
- Penon Brusi
- Penon de Afuera
- Penon de San Jorge
- Piedra Stevens
- Piedra del Norte
- Piragua de Adentro
- Piragua de Afuera, 18°16′22″N 65°30′33″W
- Puerto Rico (main island), 18°14′58″N 66°30′04″W
- Punta Larga, 18°26′50″N 65°58′55″W
- Punta Mosquitos, 18°26′41″N 65°58′33″W
- Roca Alcatraz, 18°07′24″N 65°18′04″W
- Roca Cocinera, 18°28′48″N 66°42′14″W
- Roca Cucaracha, 18°09′17″N 65°19′22″W
- Roca Culumna, 18°19′58″N 65°23′31″W
- Roca Ola, 17°56′51″N 67°10′56″W
- Roca Resuello, |18°28′42″N 66°43′06″W
- Roca Speck, 18°19′35″N 65°15′50″W
- Roca Velásquez, 18°01′24″N 67°10′40″W
- Tres Hermanas, 18°29′28″N 66°34′28″W
- Tres Hermanos, 18°28′54″N 66°42′12″W

=== United States Virgin Islands ===
There are about 84 islands in the United States Virgin Islands, including:

- Barrel of Beef, 18°18′48″N 64°54′53″W
- Blinders Rocks, 18°20′39″N 64°40′58″W
- Booby Rock, 18°18′08″N 64°42′35″W
- Bovoni Cay, 18°18′44″N 64°52′20″W
- Buck Island - Saint Croix, 17°47′13″N 64°37′10″W
- Buck Island - Saint Thomas, 18°16′39″N 64°53′38″W
- Calf Rock, 18°18′15″N 64°50′44″W
- Capella Islands, 18°24′51″N 64°54′29″W
- Carval Rock or Carvel Rock, 18°22′11″N 64°47′40″W
- Cas Cay, 18°18′25″N 64°51′55″W
- Cinnamon Cay, 18°21′23″N 64°45′23″W
- Cockroach Island, 18°24′14″N 65°03′38″W
- Coculus Rock, 18°18′50″N 64°51′39″W
- Cololoba Cay, 18°18′55″N 64°45′37″W
- Congo Cay, 18°22′04″N 64°48′10″W
- Cow Rock, 18°18′14″N 64°50′50″W
- Cricket Rock, 18°24′30″N 65°02′58″W
- Current Rock, 18°18′54″N 64°50′04″W
- Dog Island, 18°17′45″N 64°48′56″W
- Dog Rocks, 18°17′42″N 64°48′44″W
- Domkirk Rock, 18°20′06″N 65°05′04″W
- Dry Rock, 18°18′06″N 65°00′36″W
- Durloe Cays, 18°21′13″N 64°47′35″W
- Dut Cheap Cay
- Fish Cay, 18°18′35″N 64°49′58″W
- Flanagan Island, 18°19′36″N 64°39′01″W
- Flat Cays, 18°19′01″N 64°59′21″W
- Gorret Rock, 18°22′40″N 65°03′50″W
- Grass Cay, 18°21′33″N 64°49′58″W
- Great Saint James, 18°18′35″N 64°49′44″W
- Green CaySaint Croix, 17°46′01″N 64°39′57″W
- Green Cay - Saint Thomas, 18°18′37″N 64°54′29″W
- Hans Lollik Island, 18°23′53″N 64°54′29″W
- Hans Lollik Rock, 18°23′04″N 64°54′02″W
- Hassel Island, 18°19′46″N 64°56′08″W
- Henley Cay, 18°21′13″N 64°47′35″W
- Inner Brass Island, 18°22′59″N 64°58′15″W
- Kalkun Cay, 18°21′02″N 65°03′28″W
- Leduck Island, 18°18′59″N 64°41′16″W
- Limestone Rock, 18°19′04″N 64°56′47″W
- Little Hans Lollik Island, 18°24′33″N 64°54′29″W
- Harvey Island (Saint Croix), 17°41′02″N 64°45′42″W
- Little Saint James, 18°18′00″N 64°49′31″W
- Lizard Rocks, 18°23′09″N 64°59′24″W
- Lovango Cay, 18°21′45″N 64°48′13″W
- Mingo Cay, 18°21′35″N 64°49′13″W
- Outer Brass Island, 18°23′41″N 64°58′16″W
- Packet Rock, 18°17′59″N 64°53′26″W
- Patricia Cay, 18°18′25″N 64°52′19″W
- Pelican Cay, 18°24′51″N 64°54′29″W
- Perkins Cay, 18°21′15″N 64°46′38″W
- Porpoise Rocks, 18°18′30″N 64°58′21″W
- Protestant Cay, 17°44′59″N 64°42′10″W
- Ramgoat Cay, 18°21′19″N 64°47′22″W
- Rata Cay, 18°21′22″N 64°47′49″W
- Rotto Cay, 18°18′51″N 64°51′52″W
- Rupert Rock, 18°19′42″N 64°55′34″W
- Ruth Island, 17°41′03″N 64°45′41″W
- Saba Island, 18°18′19″N 65°00′02″W
- Saint Croix, 17°43′52″N 64°47′30″W
- Saint John, 18°20′32″N 64°44′35″W
- Saint Thomas, 18°21′02″N 64°55′25″W
- Salt Cay, 18°21′43″N 65°02′59″W
- Saltwater Money Rock, 18°20′41″N 65°02′57″W
- Sandy Point Rock, 18°19′46″N 64°56′48″W
- Savana Island, 18°20′22″N 65°04′45″W
- Shark Island, 18°20′14″N 64°50′40″W
- Skipper Jacob Rock, 18°19′44″N 64°48′17″W
- Steven Cay, 18°19′50″N 64°48′25″W
- The Stragglers, 18°18′12″N 64°50′08″W
- Sula Cay, 18°24′11″N 65°03′30″W
- Thatch Cay, 18°21′33″N 64°51′39″W
- Triangle Islands, 18°18′49″N 64°55′01″W
- Trunk Cay, 18°21′19″N 64°46′09″W
- Turtleback Rock, 18°20′49″N 64°51′30″W
- Turtledove Cay, 18°18′31″N 65°00′02″W
- Two Brothers, 18°20′35″N 64°49′01″W
- Water Island, 18°19′16″N 64°57′07″W
- Waterlemon Cay, 18°22′01″N 64°43′24″W
- Welk Rocks, 18°18′23″N 64°49′15″W
- West Cay, 18°21′33″N 65°02′45″W
- Whistling Cay, 18°22′13″N 64°45′14″W

Saint Thomas, Saint Croix, Saint John, and Water Island are the main four United States Virgin Islands. The capital, Charlotte Amalie, is on Saint Thomas.

=== Islands of the State of Florida ===
While not technically part of the Caribbean, the islands of Florida in the United States are considered by some to be part of the greater Gulf of Mexico Region. Regions of Florida include: South Florida, Southwest Florida, and the Florida Keys.

- Geiger Key, 24°34′56″N 81°39′09″W
- Key West, 24°33′17″N 81°47′29″W
- Key Largo, 25°10′49″N 80°21′58″W
- Loggerhead Key
- No Name Key
- Vaca Key
- Stock Island, 24°34′22″N 81°44′26″W

== Venezuela ==
The following islands of Venezuela are in the Caribbean Sea:

- Archipiélago Las Aves
  - Isla La Blanquilla, 11°50′57″N 64°36′06″W
- Archipiélago Los Monjes, 12°25′00″N 70°55′00″W
- Archipiélago Los Roques, 11°50′00″N 66°45′00″W
- Isla de Aves, 15°40′07″N 63°37′05″W
- Isla de Coche, 10°46′38″N 63°55′52″W
- Isla de Cubagua, 10°48′42″N 64°11′35″W
- Isla de Patos, 10°38′22″N 61°51′50″W
- Isla de Toas, 10°57′23″N 71°39′17″W
- Isla de Zapara. 10°58′25″N 71°33′28″W
- Isla La Orchila, 11°47′45″N 66°08′17″W
- Isla La Sola, 11°18′39″N 63°34′14″W
- Isla La Tortuga, 10°56′00″N 65°20′00″W
- Isla Margarita, 10°59′13″N 63°56′08″W
- Isla San Carlos, 11°02′21″N 71°42′39″W
- Islas los Frailes, 11°12′50″N 63°44′29″W
- Islas Caracas, 10°22′24″N 64°26′47″W
- Islas los Hermanos, 11°46′31″N 64°24′18″W
- Islas los Testigos, 11°21′58″N 63°06′37″W

== See also ==
Media related to Category:Islands of the Caribbean region at Wikimedia Commons

- List of Caribbean islands by area
- List of Caribbean island countries by population
- List of metropolitan areas in the West Indies
- List of islands by population density
- List of West Indian First-level Subdivisions
- Coral island
