= Ramgoat Cay, United States Virgin Islands =

Island in the United States Virgin Islands

Ramgoat Cay
- Location in the Caribbean Ramgoat Cay, United States Virgin Islands (the Caribbean)

Geography
- Location: Caribbean Sea
- Coordinates: 18°21′19″N 64°47′22″W

Administration
- United States
- Insular area: United States Virgin Islands

Ramgoat Cay is an islet in the United States Virgin Islands, located 310 yards northeast of Henley Cay and 1300 feet north of Hawksnest Point on the island of Saint John. It is 30 feet high and located within the Virgin Islands National Park.

== See also ==
- Islands of the United States Virgin Islands
