= Shark Island, United States Virgin Islands =

Island in the United States Virgin Islands

Shark Island
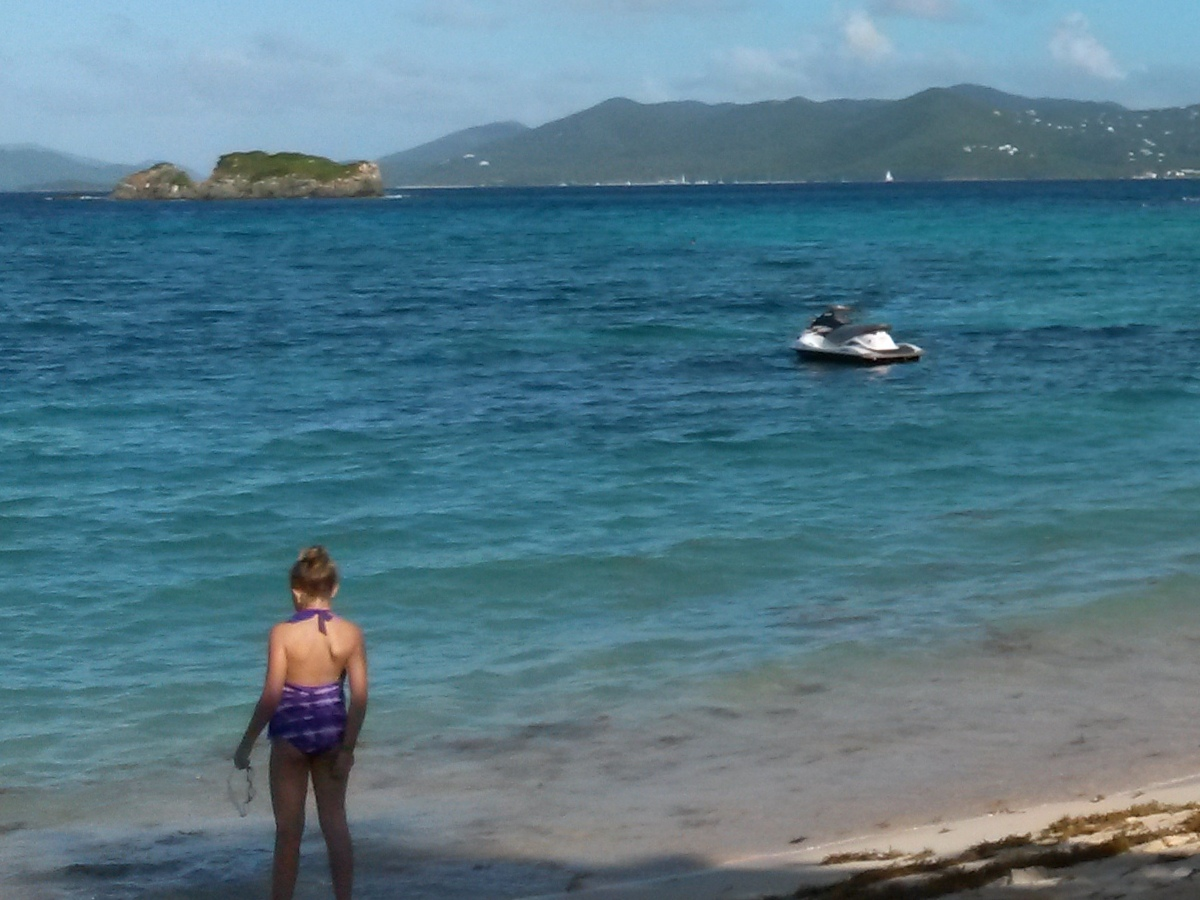
- View from Sapphire Beach

- Location in the Caribbean Shark Island, United States Virgin Islands (the Caribbean)

Geography
- Location: Caribbean Sea
- Coordinates: 18°20′14″N 64°50′41″W

Administration
- United States; United States Virgin Islands
- Federal Department: U.S. Department of the Interior
- Federal Agency: U.S. Fish and Wildlife Service
- Capital city: Washington, D.C.
- Largest settlement: New York City
- President: Donald Trump

Shark Island is a small rocky islet, located 0.3 miles (0.48 km) northeast of Prettyklip Point on Saint Thomas in the United States Virgin Islands. Its elevation is 32 feet. It is a colony for numerous species of seabirds, and is also a popular scuba-diving destination in the USVI.

== See also ==
- List of islands of the United States Virgin Islands
