= Creole Rock =

Island in the French Collectivity of Saint Martin

Coordinates: 18°7′19″N 63°03′19″W

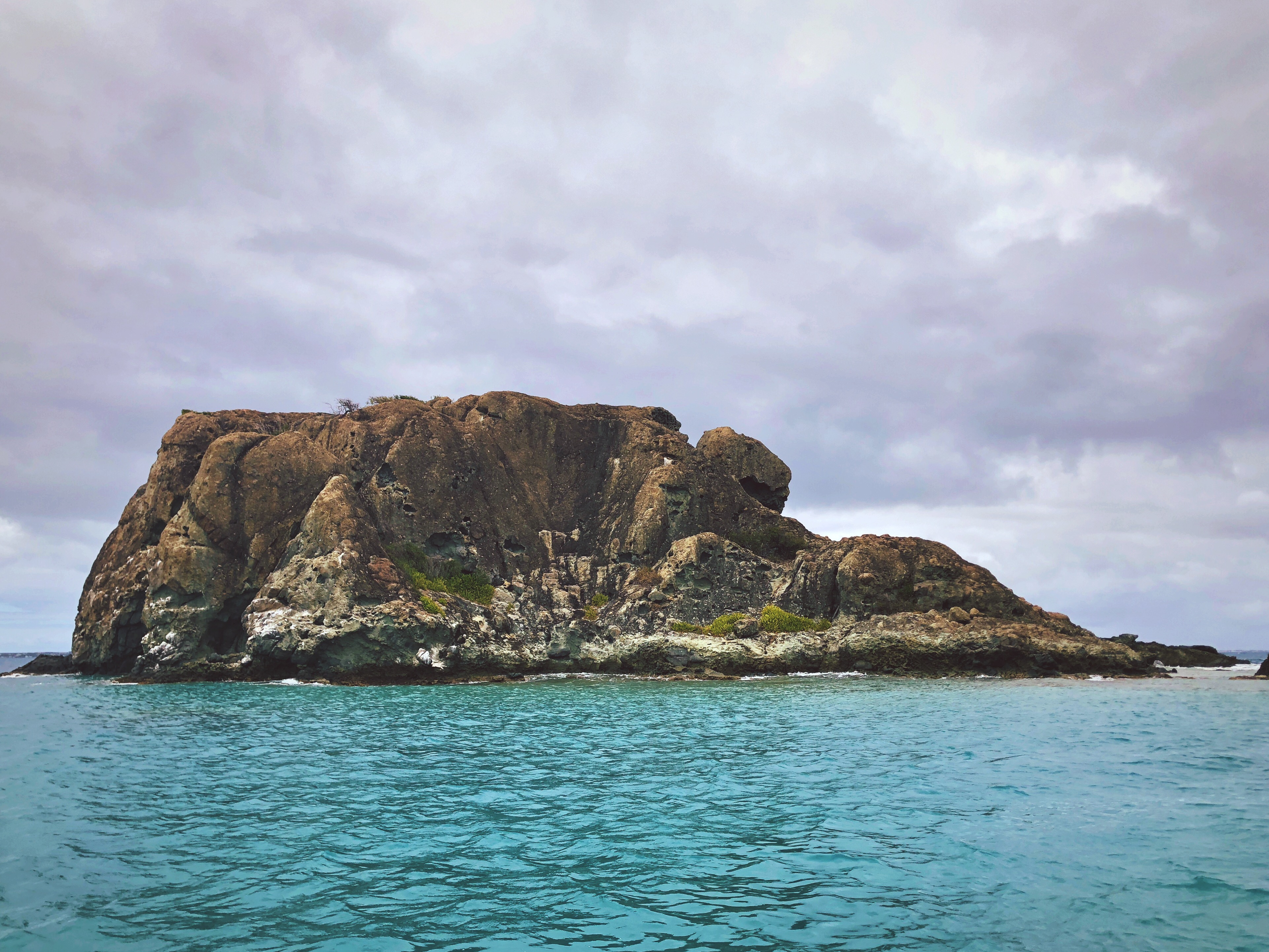
Creole Rock

Creole Rock (in French, Rocher Créole) is a small islet in the Caribbean Sea off the coast of the island of Saint Martin, and is administered as part of the French overseas collectivity of Saint Martin. It is part of the National nature reserve of Saint-Martin. The rock has an area of 0.2 square kilometres (0.1 sq mi) and is uninhabited

There is a reef off the coast of the rock and plenty of fish. It is a popular diving and snorkeling destination, with its shallow water and sandy bottom. Although it is forbidden to climb the rock itself, boats are allowed in the vicinity as long as they use the moorings.

== See also ==
- List of Caribbean islands
