= North Sound Islands =

Islands off the coast of Antigua

Coordinates: 17.140°N 61.725°W

Nickname: Antigua Bay Islands
- Interactive map of North Sound Islands

Administration
- Antigua and Barbuda
- Parish: Saint Peter

The North Sound Islands are an archipelago off the northeast coast of Antigua.

== Geography ==
At the northeastern extremity of North Sound, north of Guiana Island, are the North Sound Islands, which includes Great Bird Island, Hells Gate Island, Red Head Island, Exchange Island, Rabbit Island, and Lobster Island. The majority of the North Sound Islands are centered on Great Bird Island, the largest island and one that is located the furthest from the coast. A series of reef crowns run southwest into the North Sound from the islands. The North Sound Islands are a part of Saint Peter.

The islands have been a component of the North East Marine Management Area since 2006. The smaller islands of Antigua were integrated as an important area for coastal birds in 2007 and designated as an Offshore Islands Important Bird Area (AG006).

== Islands ==
Name	Area (square metres)	Notes
Rabbit Island	20,965	Also known as Great Man of War Island
Lobster Island	3,552	
Lobster Island Extension	615	
Redhead Island	8,995	Also known as Little Man of War Island
Exchange Island	5,147	
Hells Gate Island	5,328	
Jenny Island	733	
Galley Major Island	5,904	
Galley Minor Island	1,691	
Great Bird Island	82,514	
