= Nanny Cay =

Island of the British Virgin Islands

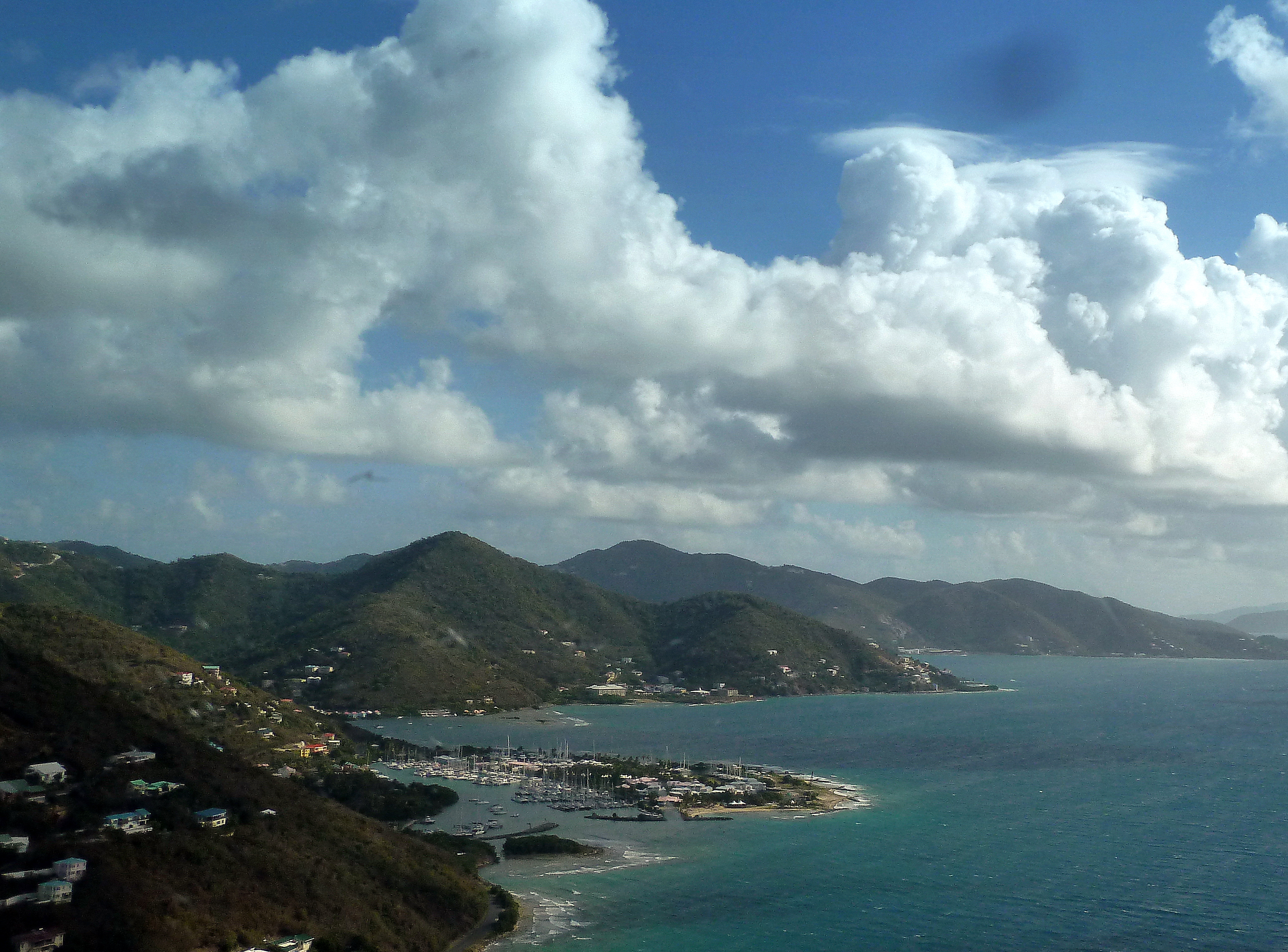
- Nanny Cay in the lower center

- Location within British Virgin Islands Location within the Caribbean

Geography
- Location: Caribbean Sea
- Coordinates: 18°24′N 64°38′W
- Archipelago: Virgin Islands

Administration
- United Kingdom
- British Overseas Territory: British Virgin Islands

Additional information
- Time zone: AST (UTC-4)
- ISO code: VG

Nanny Cay is an island of the British Virgin Islands in the Caribbean. It is made up of three cays originally known as Big Cay, Little Cay and Miss Peggy Cay. In the 1970s these were consolidated into a single land mass for a marina and resort development. It is connected to Tortola by a short bridge. A marina, hotel, restaurants, condominiums and townhouses have now been built on Nanny Cay.

It also holds a minor footnote in legal history, having been the subject of a receivership for over 12 years during the 1980s and 1990s, and is the longest ever receivership in the history of Barclays Bank PLC. The current owners, Cameron McColl, John McCoach, and Graeme Scott purchased it from Barclays.

Today, Nanny Cay has a marina and boatyard which has berths for 180 motor cruisers and yachts and two boat lifts of 50 and 70 tons capacity with storage for 200 boats. It also includes a 40-room hotel and new waterfront townhouses for purchase and rental, two restaurants, a small supermarket, shops and boutiques, a dive shop, a water sports centre ran by the Royal BVI Yacht Club, and a gym and spa.

BVI Real estate investor Joe Chapman has used Nanny Cay as a useful example in the context of a discussion on the unique economic properties of marinas based on islands.
