= Calala Island =

Island in Caribbean

- Interactive map of Calala Island

Geography
- Location: Caribbean Sea
- Coordinates: 12.4376°N 83.4321°W
- Archipelago: Pearl Cays
- Area: 4.5 ha (11 acres)

Administration
- South Caribbean Coast Autonomous Region

Additional information
- Official website: www.calala-island.com

Calala Island is a private island located in the Caribbean Sea, forming part of an archipelago of islands known as the Pearl Cays, off the coast of Nicaragua.

Calala Island is privately owned by the Wickham family. The whole island operates as a luxury resort, accommodating a maximum of twelve guests.

== History ==
Calala Island is situated in an area known as the Moskito Coast. When the Treaty of Managua was signed in 1860 between the British and Nicaragua, Calala Island became a Nicaraguan island.

== Ecosystem ==
The ecosystem on the island has a number of notable species, mainly seabirds and turtles. According to accounts from François l'Olonnais, parrots and monkeys were previously located in the Pearl Cays region.

The critically endangered hawksbill sea turtle are often seen on the island and is part of a conservation effort to increase the numbers. Calala Island's owners and the Wildlife Conservation Society have increased nesting numbers considerably since the partnership began. It is estimated that nests on the island have increased significantly, with around 6000 eggs laid on the island by the Hawksbills each year. Laying season for the turtles is from May through to November, with hatchings taking place September through to February.

Other islands species include the American yellow warbler, the white-necked puffbird, hummingbirds and the magnificent frigatebird.

== Location ==
Calala Island is located in the Caribbean Sea and is part of the Pearl Cays archipelago, off the coast of Nicaragua. The island is under the administration of the South Caribbean Coast Autonomous Region. At some point in its history, the name of the island changed from Lime Cay to Calala Island. The likelihood is due to a name clash with a Jamaican cay. The island is located around 4 km off the Nicaraguan coast lying 27 km from Pearl Lagoon and 150 km west of San Andres, Ciudad Sandino, Nicaragua.

== Private ownership ==
In 1997, a number of Nicaraguan islands were purchased by businessmen. Calala Island was one of these islands and like many islands in the Caribbean, the purchase raised questions about the split between private and public use at the time. Necker island is one such example of this ongoing debate. Some in the media suggested that the islands were bought as an investment, with the aims of developing them.

Tim and Sarah Wickham purchased Calala Island after their honeymoon on Petit St Vincent, with the aim of creating a resort on the island. The Wickham's then developed the island with the construction of a luxury resort. The island resort contains six guest suites at the beachfront, accommodating a total of 12 guests. During interviews, Wickham stated that he wanted the island to be exclusive, but also protect the ecosystem. Apart from the suites, the island has 25 staff, a bar, two restaurants and a helipad.

It received media coverage in 2017 after a week-long vacation had a price tag of $1 million. In early 2018, it was announced that Princess Eugenie became engaged to Jack Brooksbank while vacationing on Calala Island.

== See also ==
- Tourism in Nicaragua
- Pearl Lagoon
