= Caracas Islands =

Venezuelan-ruled Archipelago in the Caribbean Sea

Islas Caracas
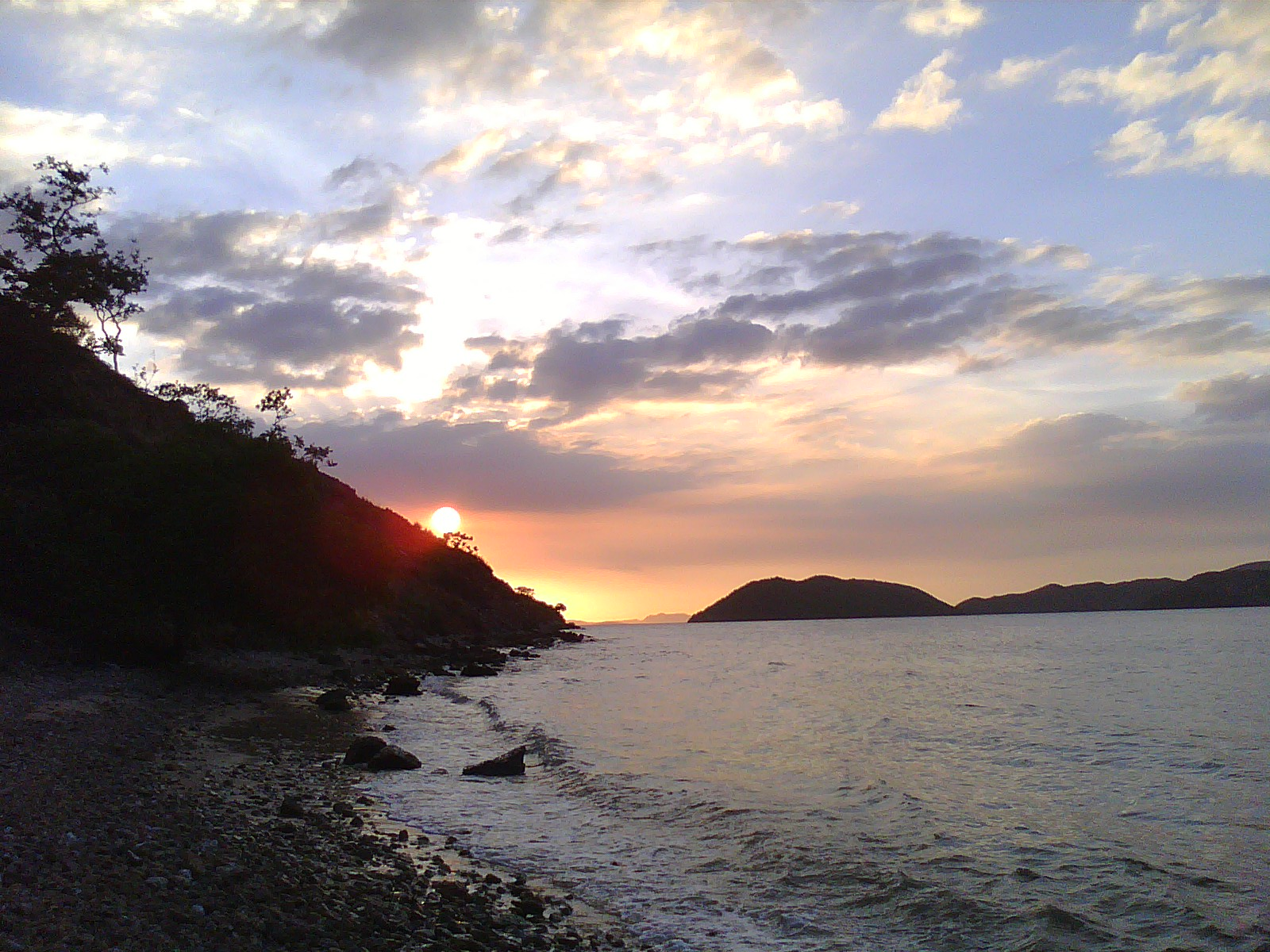
- Caracas Islands
- Interactive map of Islas Caracas

Geography
- Location: Caribbean Sea
- Coordinates: 10°15′41″N 64°28′48″W
- Major islands: Caracas del Este; Caracas del Oeste

Administration
- Venezuela
- Anzoátegui

Demographics
- Population: 0

Islas Caracas are an archipelago in the Caribbean Sea consists of 2 islands, which belong to Venezuela, located in eastern Sucre state, north of the peninsula of Santa Fe, west of the Manaure peninsula and the Venado island and east of the island Picúa Grande, from the December 19, 1973 under Decree No. 1534 belong to the Mochima National Park.

== Islands ==
These islands are uninhabited, showing landscapes with xerophytic vegetation and rocky coral formations

- Caracas Islands consist of two main islands
  - Eastern Caracas (Caracas del Este)
  - Western Caracas (Caracas del Oeste)

== Gallery ==
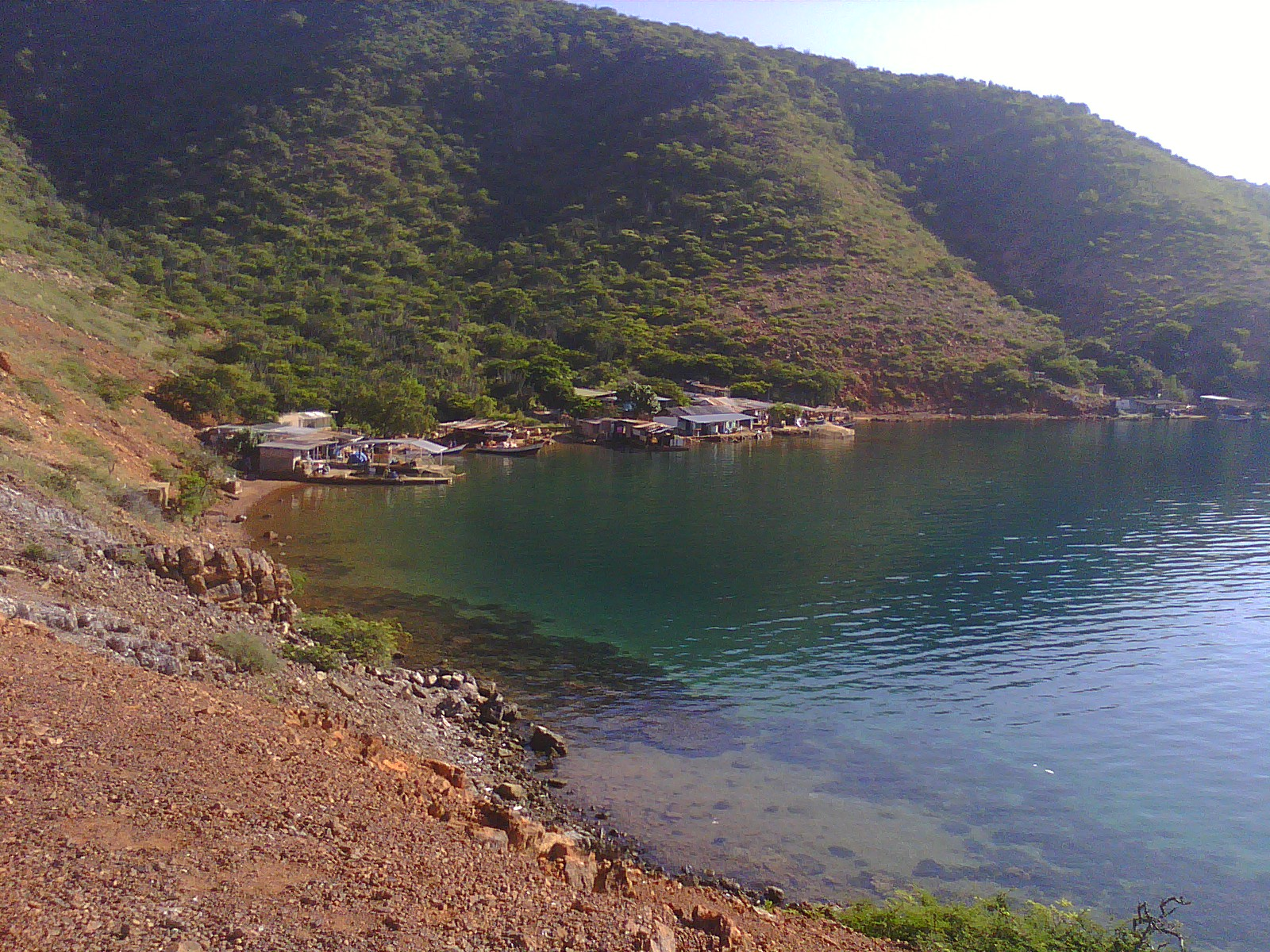

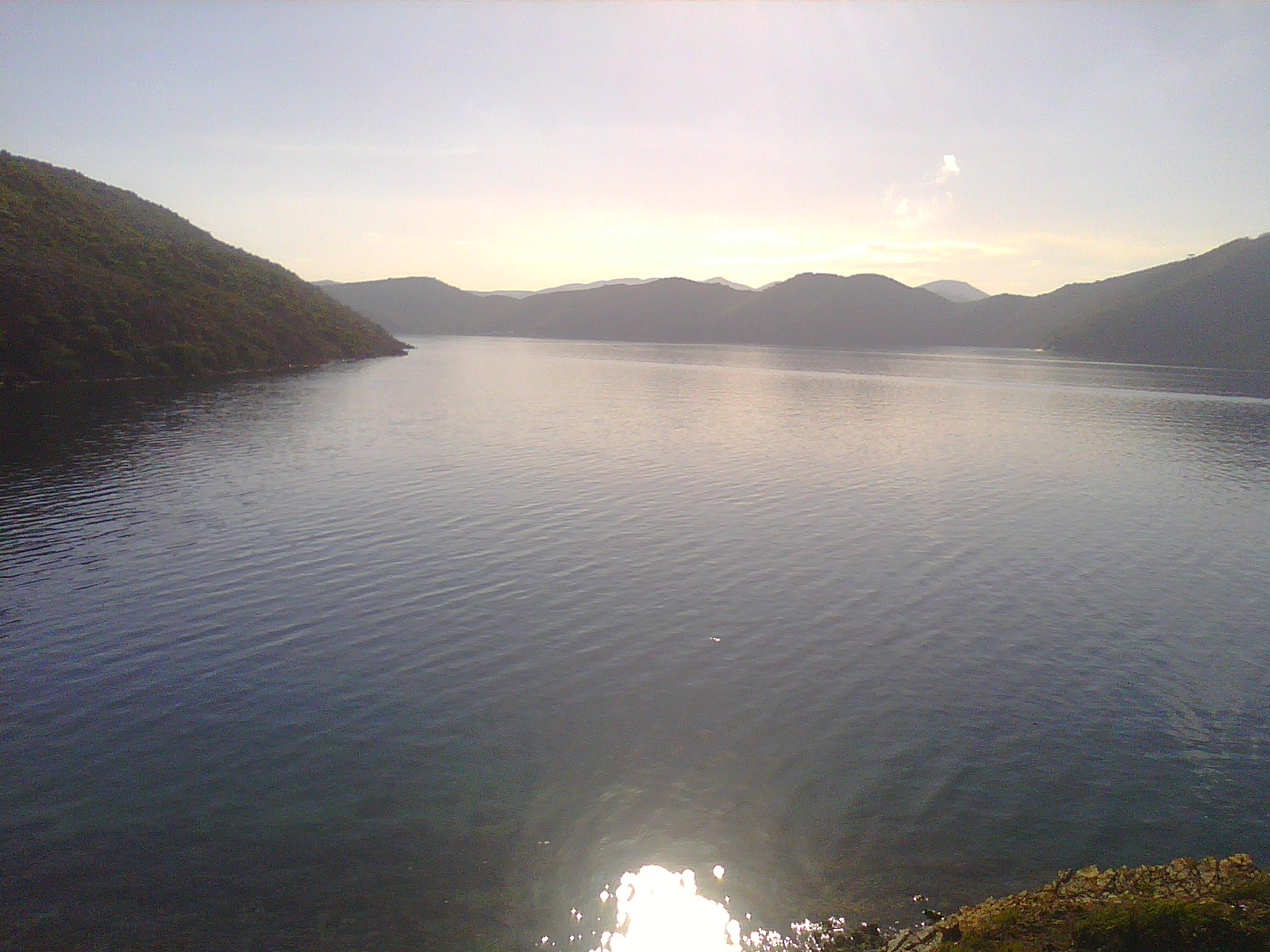

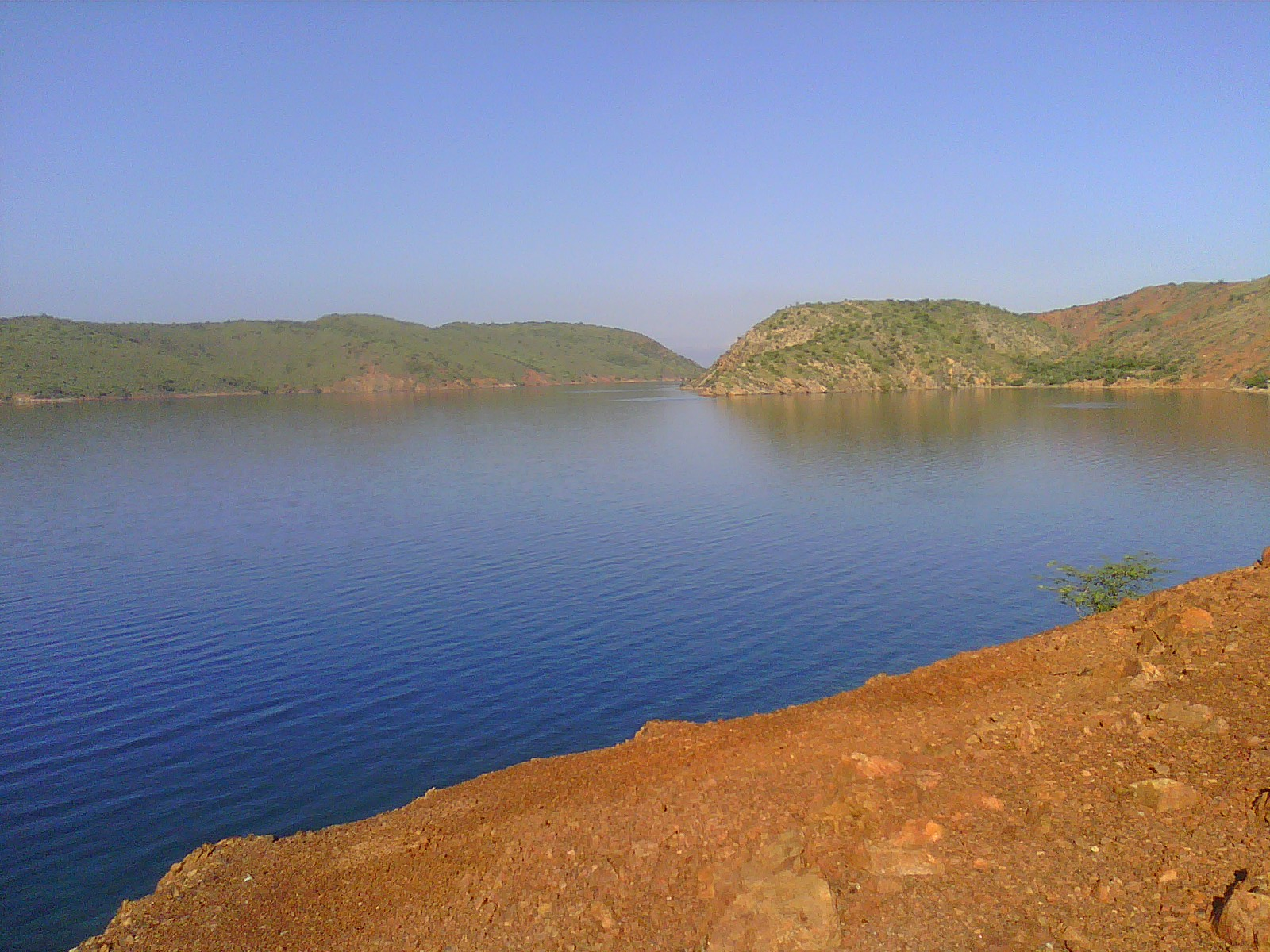

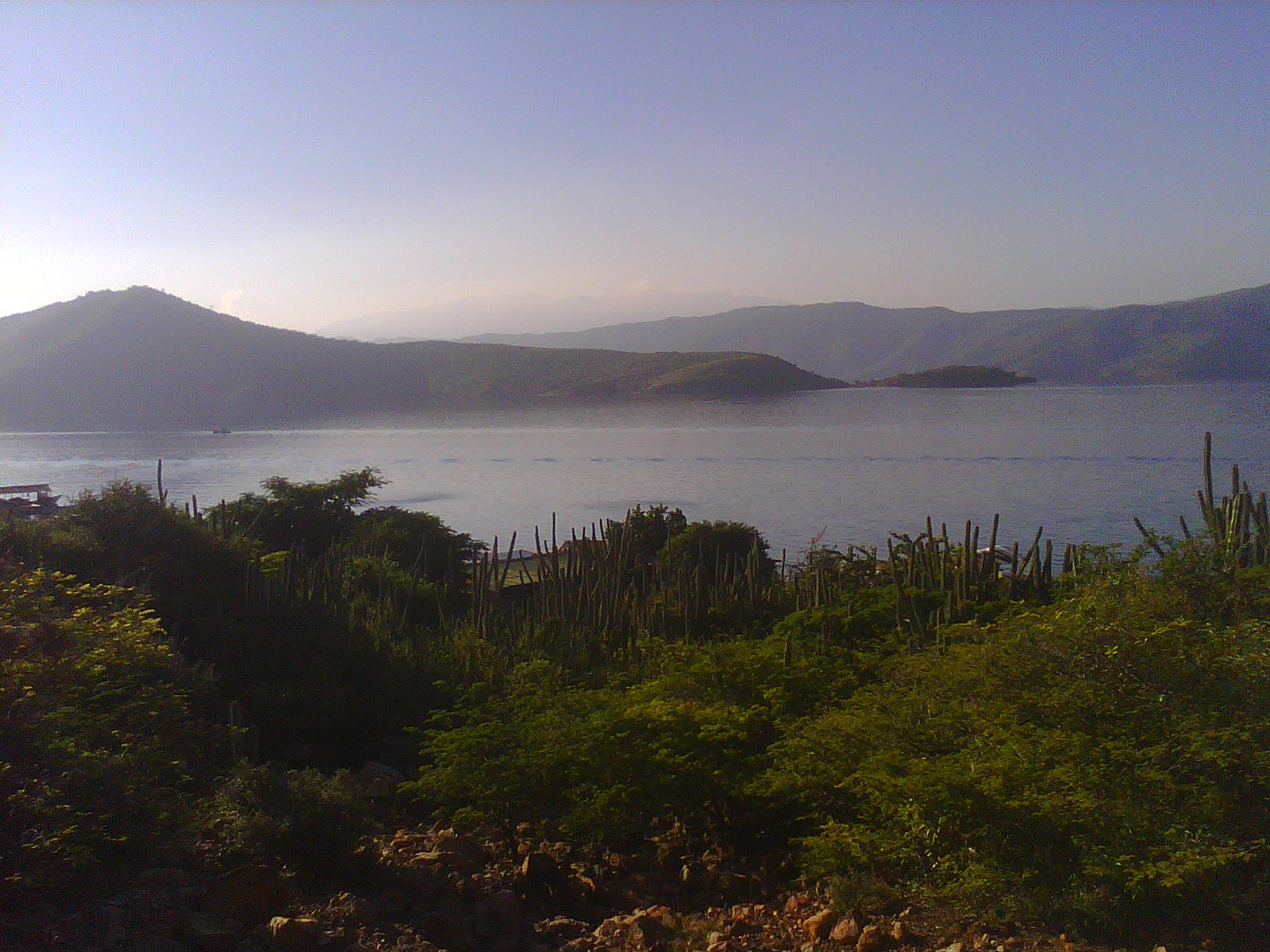

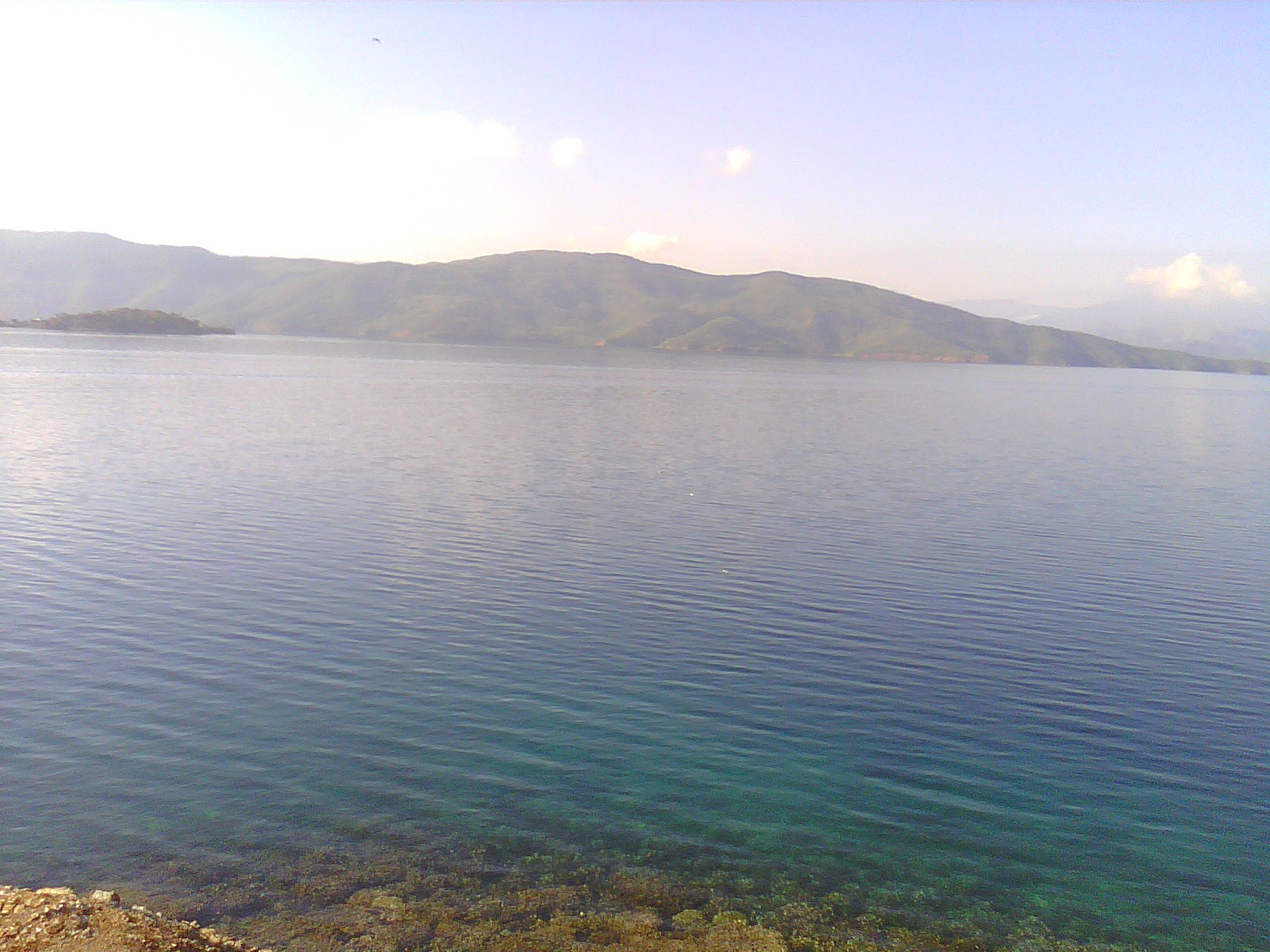

== See also ==
- Geography of Venezuela
