= List of islands of the United Kingdom =

This is a list of islands of the United Kingdom. The United Kingdom of Great Britain and Northern Ireland has thousands of islands within its territory and several external territories. This is a list of selected British islands grouped by constituent country or overseas territory. The largest British island is Great Britain, which forms a substantial majority of the United Kingdom and is the ninth-largest island in the world.

== United Kingdom ==
The United Kingdom is composed of four parts: England, Northern Ireland, Scotland and Wales.

- Great Britain (the largest island in Europe)

=== England ===
- Barrow Island
- Bawden Rocks
- Brownsea Island
- Canvey Island
- Coquet Island
- Drake's Island
- Eddystone
- Farne Islands
  - Staple Island
- Foulness Island
- Furzey Island
- Green Island
- Havergate Island
- Hayling Island
- Hilbre Island
- Isle of Portland
- Isle of Sheppey
- Isle of Wight
- Isles of Scilly
  - Annet
  - Bryher
  - Gugh
  - Samson
  - St Agnes
  - St Helen's
  - St Martin's
  - St Mary's
  - Tresco
- Lindisfarne
- Lundy
  - Seal's Rock
- Mersea Island
- Pilsey Island
- Portsea Island
- Read's Island
- Roa Island
- Seghy
- Stanlow Island
- Steep Holm
- The Gwineas
- Thorney Island
- Virtle Rock
- Wallasea Island
- Walney Island

=== Northern Ireland ===
Northern Ireland is a part of the island of Ireland, see; list of islands of Ireland and list of inland islands of Ireland.

- Boa Island
- Cannon Rock
- Copeland Islands
- Lustymore Island
- Rathlin Island
- Ram's Island
- White Island

=== Scotland ===
The Outer Hebrides of Scotland

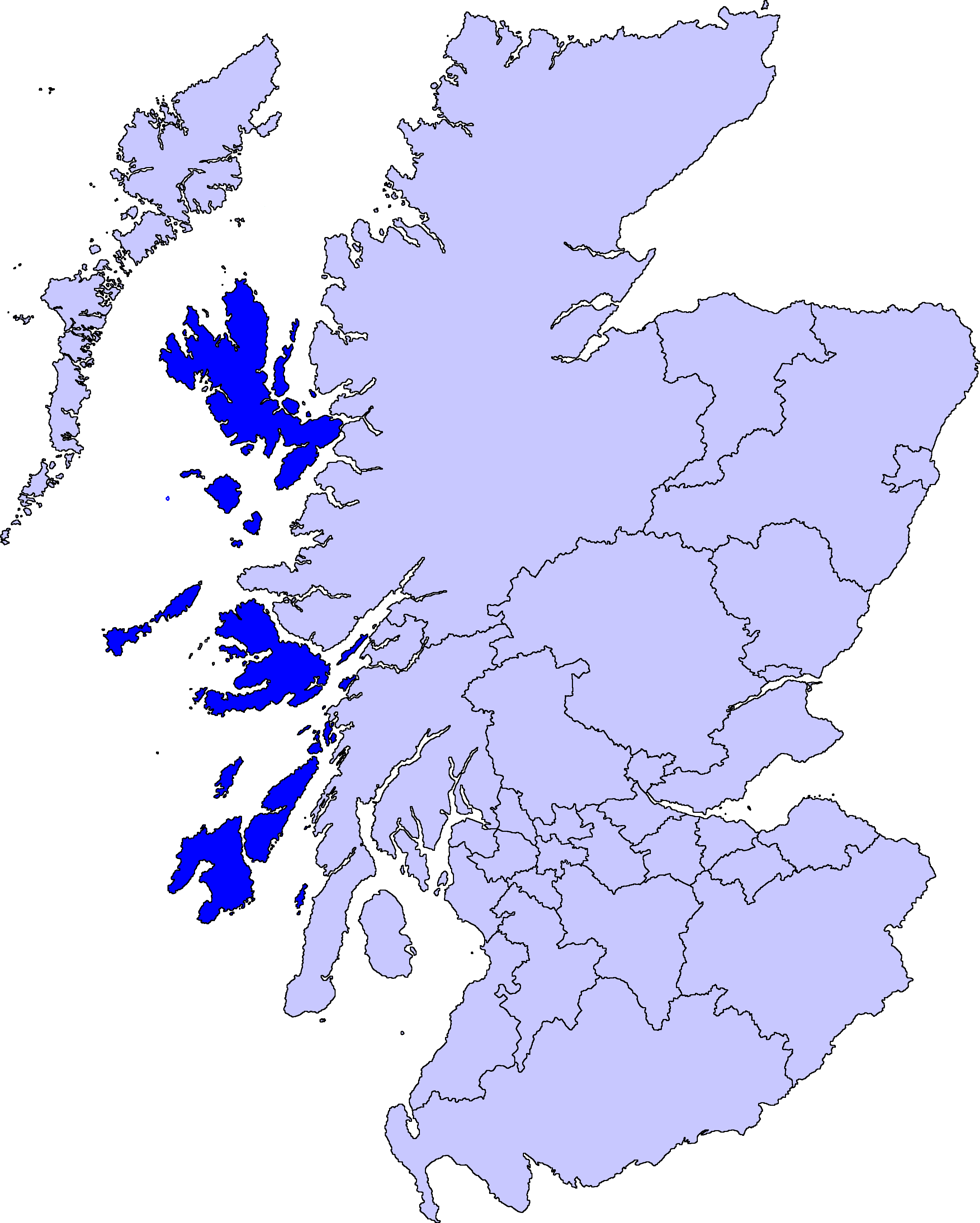
The Inner Hebrides of Scotland

- Ailsa Craig
- Arran
- Bute
- Isle of Skye
- Raasay
- Rona (disambiguation)
- Soay (disambiguation)
- Muck
- Eigg
- Rùm
- Shuna
- Colonsay
- Oronsay
- Scarba
- Easdale
- Jura
- Islay
- Mull
- Ulva
- Gometra
- Iona
- Coll
- Tiree
- Lewis and Harris (the largest island in the British Isles after Great Britain and Ireland)
- Orkney
  - Mainland
- Shetland
- Rockall
- Hiort or Hirta
- Boreray (disambiguation)
- Stac Lee
- Vatersay
- Eriskay
- Grimsay
- Berneray
- Barra
- Mingulay
- South Uist
- Benbecula
- North Uist
- Vallay
- Killegray
- Berneray (disambiguation)
- Taransay
- Scarp
- Mealasta Island
- Scalpay, Inner Hebrides
- Scalpay, Outer Hebrides
- Great Bernera
- Little Bernera
- Pabbay Mhor
- Pabbay Bheag
- Berisay
- The Old Hill
- Flodday
- Vuia Mhor
- Vuia Bheag
- Vacasay West Loch Roag
- Vacasay East Loch Roag
- North Rona
- Sulisker
- Eilean Colm Cille
- Hoy
- North Ronaldsay
- South Ronaldsay
- Sanday
- Westray
- Rousay
- Gairsay
- Eday
- Auskerry
- Stronsay
- Shapinsay
- Burray
- Copinsay
- Foula
- Whalsay
- Yell
- Unst
- Fair Isle
- Fetlar
- Bressay
- East and West Burra
- Muckle Roe
- Papa Stour
- Trondra
- Out Skerries
- Mousa
- About 800 other islands

=== Wales ===
- Anglesey (the largest island of Wales)
  - Church Island
  - Cribinau
  - East Mouse
  - Holy Island
  - Middle Mouse
  - North Stack
  - Puffin Island
  - Salt Island
  - The Skerries
  - South Stack
  - West Mouse
- Bardsey Island
- Caldey Island
- Cardigan Island
- Denny Island
- Flat Holm
- Grassholm Island
- Ramsey Island
- Skokholm Island
- Skomer Island
- Sully Island

== Overseas Territories ==
=== Anguilla ===
- Anguilla
- Anguillita
- Dog Island
- Prickly Pear Cays
- Sandy Island, also known as Sand Island
- Scrub Island
- Seal Island
- Sombrero, also known as Hat Island

=== Bermuda ===
- Boaz Island
- Castle Island
- Hawkins Island
- Ireland Island
- Nonsuch Island
- Ordnance Island
- Paget Island
- Saint David's Island
- Saint George's Island
- Smith's Island
- Somerset Island
- Trunk Island

=== British Antarctic Territory ===
Much of the British Antarctic Territory is also included in the overlapping claims of Chile and Argentina. None of these claims have gained wide international recognition (only the British claim gained any), and all is suspended. All are regulated by the Antarctic Treaty.

- Adelaide Island
- Astrolabe Island
- Berkner Island
- Dundee Island
- D'Urville Island
- James Ross Island
  - Lockyer Island
- Joinville Island
- Snow Hill Island
- South Orkney Islands
  - Acuña Island
  - Coronation Island
  - Inaccessible Islands
  - Laurie Island
  - Powell Island
  - Robertson Island
  - Saddle Islands
  - Shagnasty Island
  - Signy Island
  - Valette Island
- South Shetland Islands
  - Aitcho Islands
    - Barrientos Island
    - Emeline Island
    - Jorge Island
    - Cecilia Island, named Isla Torre by Chile
    - Sierra Island
    - Passage Rock
    - Morris Rock
  - Clarence Island
  - Deception Island
  - Elephant Island
    - Cornwallis Island
    - Gibbs Island
    - Rowett Island
    - Seal Islands
  - Greenwich Island
  - King George Island
    - Bridgeman Island
    - Penguin Island
  - Livingston Island
    - Desolation Island
    - Half Moon Island
    - Rugged Island
  - Low Island
  - Nelson Island
  - Robert Island
  - Smith Island
  - Snow Island
- Vega Island
- ZigZag Island

=== British Indian Ocean Territory ===
- Blenheim Reef
- Danger Island
- Diego Garcia
- Eagle Islands
  - Eagle Island (Ile Aigle)
  - Ile Aux Vaches
- Egmont Islands
  - Eastern Egmont (Ile Sud-Est)
  - Ile aux Rats
  - Ile Carre Pate
  - Ile Cipaye
  - Ile Lubine
- Ganges Bank
- Great Chagos Bank
- Nelsons Island
- Owen Bank
- Peros Banhos
- Pitt Bank
- Salomon Islands
  - Ile Anglaise
  - Ile Boddam
  - Ile Charles
  - Ile de la Passe
  - Ile Diable
  - Ile Du Sel
  - Ile Fouquet
  - Ile Jacobin
  - Ile Mapou
  - Ile Poule
  - Ile Sepulture
  - Takamaka Islands
    - Ile Takamaka
- Speakers Bank
- Victory Bank
- Wight Bank

=== British Virgin Islands ===
- Anegada
  - Horseshoe Reef
  - Little Anegada
- Beef Island
  - Bellamy Cay
  - Whale Rock
- Dog Islands
  - George Dog Island
  - Great Dog Island
  - Seal Dog Islands
    - East Seal Dog Island
    - Little Seal Dog Island
  - West Dog Island
- Jost Van Dyke
  - Little Jost Van Dyke
- Little Sisters
  - Carvel Rock
  - Cooper Island
  - Ginger Island
  - Norman Island
  - Pelican Island
    - Carrot Rock
    - Dead Chest Island
  - Salt Island
- Tortola
  - Buck Island
- Virgin Gorda
  - Eustatia Island
  - Fallen Jerusalem Island
  - Mosquito Island
  - Necker Island
  - Round Rock

=== Cayman Islands ===
- Cayman Brac
- Grand Cayman
- Little Cayman
  - Owen Island

=== Falkland Islands ===
The Falkland Islands are also claimed by Argentina, see: Falkland Islands sovereignty dispute.

- East Falkland
  - Sea Lion Island
- West Falkland
  - Jason Islands
    - Elephant Jason Island
    - Flat Jason Island
    - Grand Jason Island
    - South Jason Island
    - Steeple Jason Island
  - Passage Islands
  - Pebble Island
    - East Island
    - Golding Island
    - Pebble Islet
    - Rabbit Island
  - Saunders Island
  - Swan Islands
    - North Swan Island
    - Swan Island
    - West Swan Island
  - Weddell Island

=== Montserrat ===
- Montserrat
  - Goat Islet
  - Little Redonda
  - Pinnacle Rock
  - Statue Rock

=== Pitcairn Islands ===
- Ducie Island
  - Acadia Islet
  - Edwards Islet
  - Pandora Islet
  - Westward Islet
- Henderson Island
- Oeno Island
- Pitcairn Island

=== St Helena, Ascension and Tristan da Cunha ===
St Helena, Ascension and Tristan da Cunha have formed the British Overseas Territory of Saint Helena, Ascension and Tristan da Cunha since 2009.

- Saint Helena
- Ascension Island
  - Boatswain Bird Island
    - Boatswain Bird Rock
  - Tartar Rock
  - White Rocks
- Tristan da Cunha
  - Gough Island (a dependency of Tristan da Cunha)
  - Inaccessible Island
    - Nightingale Islands
    - Middle Island
    - Nightingale Island
    - Stoltenhoff Island

=== South Georgia and the South Sandwich Islands ===
South Georgia and the South Sandwich Islands are also claimed by Argentina. See Falkland Islands sovereignty dispute.

- Black Rock
- Clerke Rocks
- Shag Rocks
- South Georgia
  - Annenkov Island
  - Bird Island
  - Cooper Island
  - Grassholm
  - Grass Island
  - Pickersgill Islands
  - Welcome Islands
  - Willis Islands
    - Main Island
    - Trinity Island
- South Sandwich Islands
  - Candlemas Islands
  - Central Islands
  - Southern Thule
  - Traversay Islands

=== Turks and Caicos Islands ===
- Turks Islands
  - Grand Turk Island
    - Gibbs Cay
  - Salt Cay
    - Cotton Cay
- Caicos Islands
  - East Caicos
  - Middle Caicos
  - North Caicos
  - Parrot Cay
  - Providenciales
  - South Caicos
  - West Caicos

== See also ==
The Crown Dependencies are not part of the United Kingdom. For details of islands within their territories, see:

- List of islands of the Bailiwick of Guernsey
- List of islands of the Bailiwick of Jersey
- List of islands of the Isle of Man
