= Dog Island =

Dog Island may refer to:

== Islands ==
Anguilla

- Dog Island, Anguilla

Antarctica

- Dog Island (Antarctica)

Australia

- Great Dog Island (Tasmania)
- Little Dog Island, Tasmania
- South East Great Dog Islet, Tasmania

British Virgin Islands

- Dog Islands,
  - East Seal Dog Island
  - George Dog Island
  - Great Dog Island
  - Little Seal Dog Island
  - West Dog Island

Canada

- Dog Island (Alberta)
- Dog Island (Nunavut)

The Gambia

- Dog Island, Gambia

New Zealand

- Dog Island (New Zealand)

United States

- Dog Island (Florida)
  - Dog Island Light
- Dog Island (New York)

U.S. Virgin Islands

- Dog Island, U.S. Virgin Islands

== Other ==
- The Dog Island, video game

== See also ==
- L'Île-aux-Marins, Saint Pierre and Miquelon, formerly known as "Île-aux-Chiens"
- Kitsissuarsuit, Greenland, formerly known as "Dog's Island"
- Isle of Dogs (disambiguation)
- Canary Islands, known in its native Spanish as Islas Canarias, which ultimately derives from its Latin name Canariae Insulae meaning Islands of the Dogs.
