= Sandy Spit =

Island in the British Virgin Islands

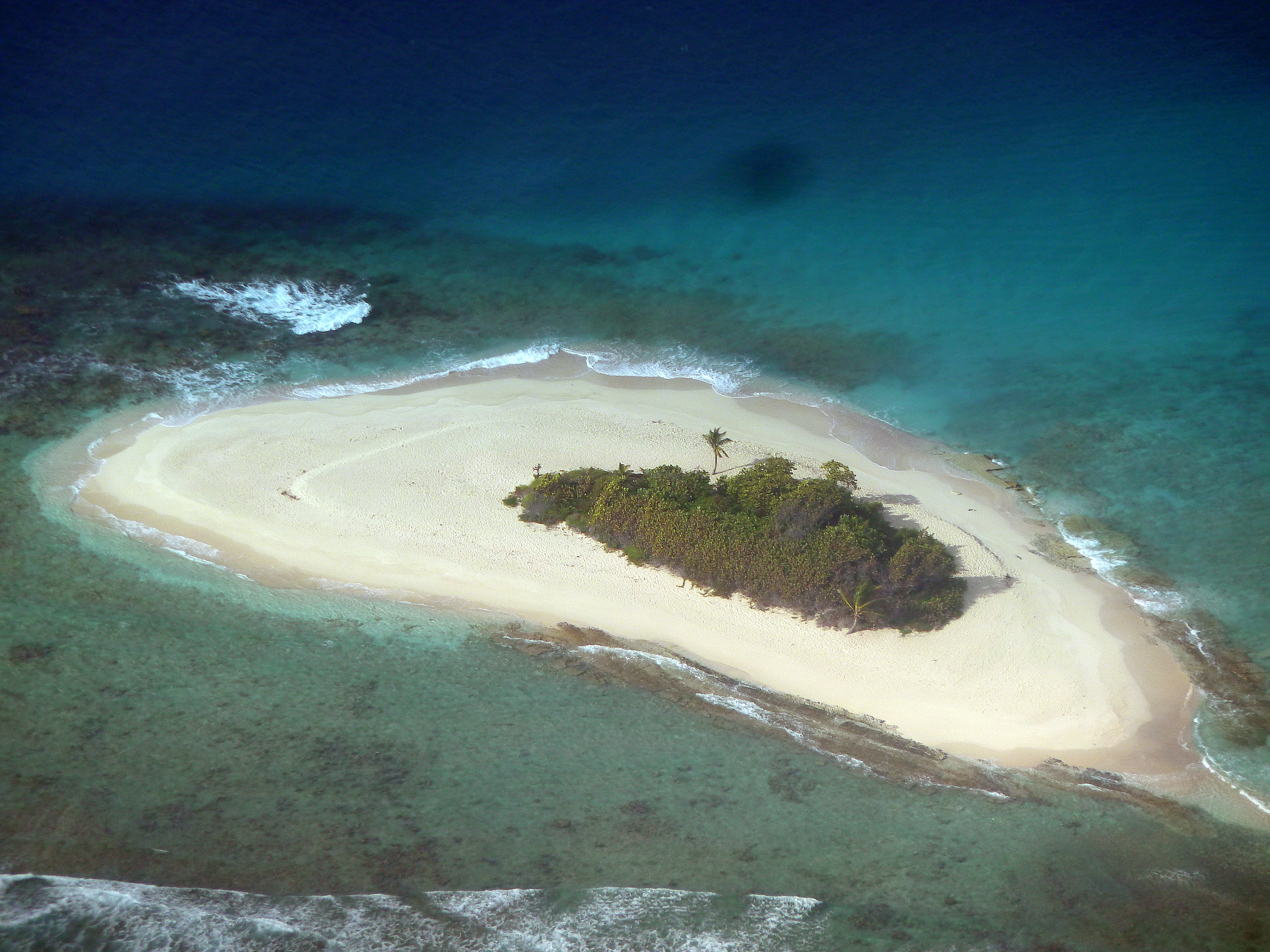
- Sandy Spit in 2012

- Location within British Virgin Islands Location within the Caribbean

Geography
- Location: Caribbean Sea
- Coordinates: 18°26′59″N 64°42′32″W
- Archipelago: Virgin Islands

Administration
- United Kingdom
- British Overseas Territory: British Virgin Islands

Additional information
- Time zone: AST (UTC-4)
- ISO code: VG

Sandy Spit is an uninhabited islet of the British Virgin Islands in the Caribbean, sitting midway between Sandy Cay and Green Cay. It measures less than half an acre in size, and consists entirely of a ring of sandy beach surrounding light foliage. It has the appearance of a classic paradise "desert island" and has been photographed for use in print medium in a number of advertising campaigns. Sandy Spit is a popular stop for day and term boat charters from Tortola, St. Thomas, and St. John. There are no moorings, but the sandy bottom is suitable for anchoring.

Sandy Spit was nearly wiped out by Hurricane Irma. Half the beach is gone as of 12 September 2017.

The island provides habitat for the crested anole (Anolis cristatellus wileyae), and the big-scaled least gecko (Sphaerodactylus macrolepis macrolepis).
