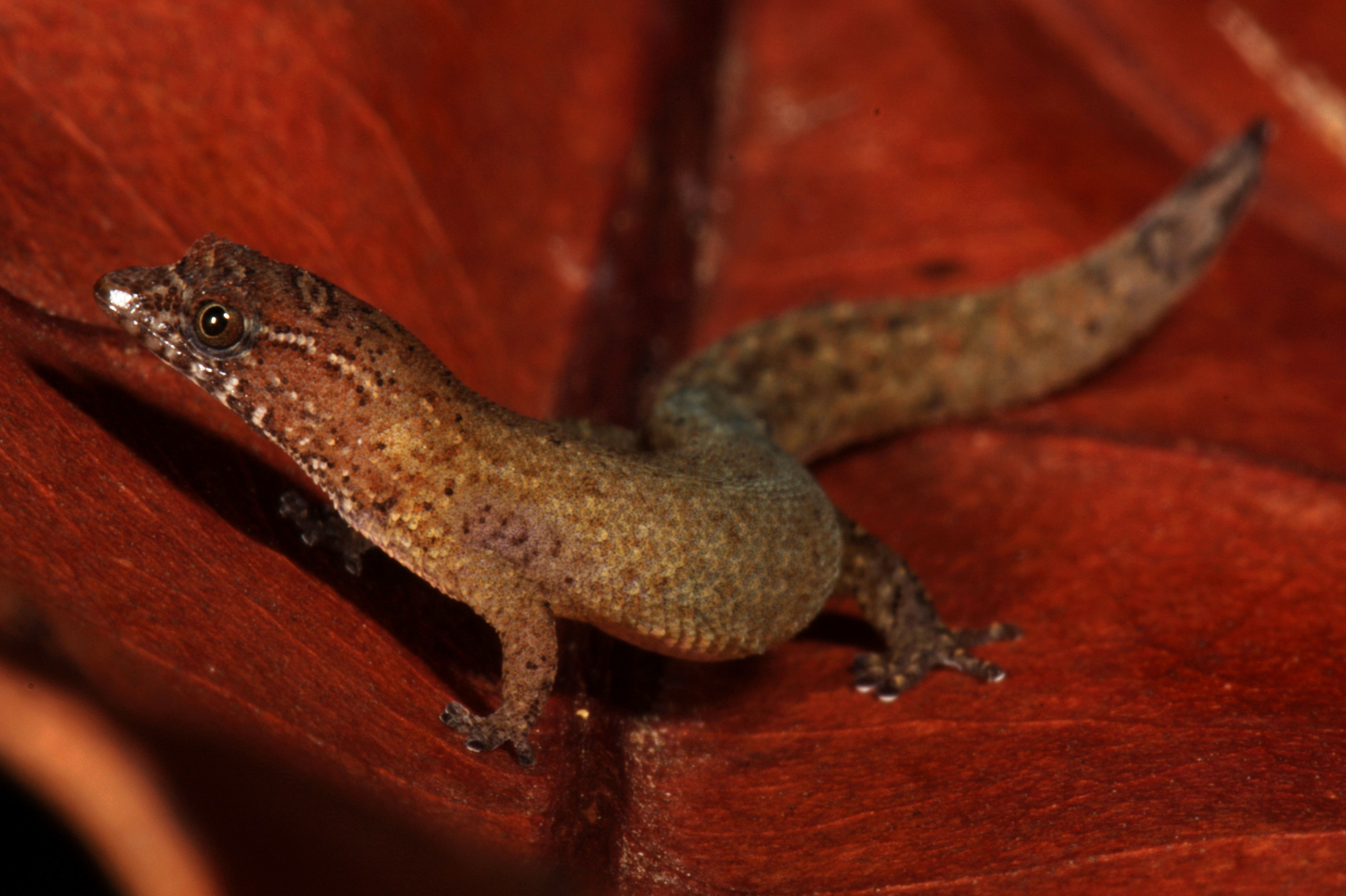

Conservation status
- Endangered (IUCN 3.1)

Scientific classification
- Kingdom: Animalia
- Phylum: Chordata
- Class: Reptilia
- Order: Squamata
- Suborder: Gekkota
- Family: Sphaerodactylidae
- Genus: Sphaerodactylus
- Species: S. parthenopion

Binomial name
- Sphaerodactylus parthenopion Thomas, 1965
- General distribution of Sphaerodactylus parthenopion

= Virgin Islands dwarf sphaero =

Virgin Islands dwarf sphaero gecko

Species of reptile

The British Virgin Islands dwarf sphaero gecko, Virgin Gorda least gecko, or Virgin Islands dwarf gecko (Sphaerodactylus parthenopion) is a species of gecko and also one of the smallest terrestrial vertebrates. It has only been found on three of the British Virgin Islands: Virgin Gorda, Tortola, and Moskito Island (also spelled "Mosquito Island"). It was discovered in 1964 and is suspected to be a close relative of Sphaerodactylus nicholsi, a dwarf sphaero from the nearby island of Puerto Rico. It shares its range with the big-scaled least gecko (S. macrolepis), which is found in leaf litter. Unlike this larger gecko, the Virgin Islands dwarf sphaero lives on drier hillsides, yet prefers moist microhabitats found under rocks because it lacks the adaptations necessary for preventing water loss, which is a significant problem due to its small body size.

The Virgin Islands dwarf sphaero has a deep brown colour on its upper side, often with a speckling of darker scales. On average, it measures 18 mm (0.71 in) from its snout to its vent, and is nearly as small as a U.S. dime. At most, it weighs 0.15 g (0.0053 oz). There are several stripes or bars of lighter colouration behind the eyes and at the top of the neck that help distinguish it. There are no differences in colouration between males and females, although females are slightly larger in size. Its tail will regenerate when broken off. Little is known about its population size or its biology.

== Taxonomy ==
The Virgin Islands dwarf sphaero, also referred to as the Virgin Islands dwarf gecko, was discovered in the summer of 1964 by biologist Richard Thomas during a collecting trip along the dry, wooded slopes of Virgin Gorda in the British Virgin Islands. The holotype for Sphaerodactylus parthenopion, MCZ 77211, was an adult female collected on 12 August 1964 on a hillside above Pond Bay. A total of eight paratypes were collected on Virgin Gorda and used to describe the new species.

Classified as a species of dwarf sphaero or dwarf gecko (genus Sphaerodactylus), it is characterised not only by its small body size, but also by a distinctive scale colouration pattern on its head, scales that are small but keeled (having a central ridge) and imbricate on its upper (dorsal) side; a generally uniform dark colouration of the dorsal side, a lack of granular scales on the mid-dorsal area, and a lack of colouration patterns around the shoulders (scapular region) and the pelvis (sacral region).

Despite striking differences in appearance, S. parthenopion may be most closely related to S. nicholsi. Like the diminutive S. parthenopion in the Virgin Islands, S. nicholsi, the smallest endemic sphaerodactylid in Puerto Rico, is very small. The geographic range of another species, S. townsendi, divides these two closely related populations, suggesting that S. townsendi evolved after S. parthenopion and S. nicholsi diverged.

== Description ==
The Virgin Islands dwarf sphaero is one of the smallest known amniotes (which includes 23,000 species of reptiles, birds, and mammals), with an average body size (measured as the snout–vent length or SVL) of 18 mm (0.71 in) and a maximum body mass of 0.15 g (0.0053 oz), but ranging as low as 0.043 g (0.0015 oz) and averaging 0.117 g (0.0041 oz). The only known amniote that is smaller is the closely related S. ariasae, which measures 16 mm (0.63 in) and weighs a maximum of 0.14 g (0.0049 oz).

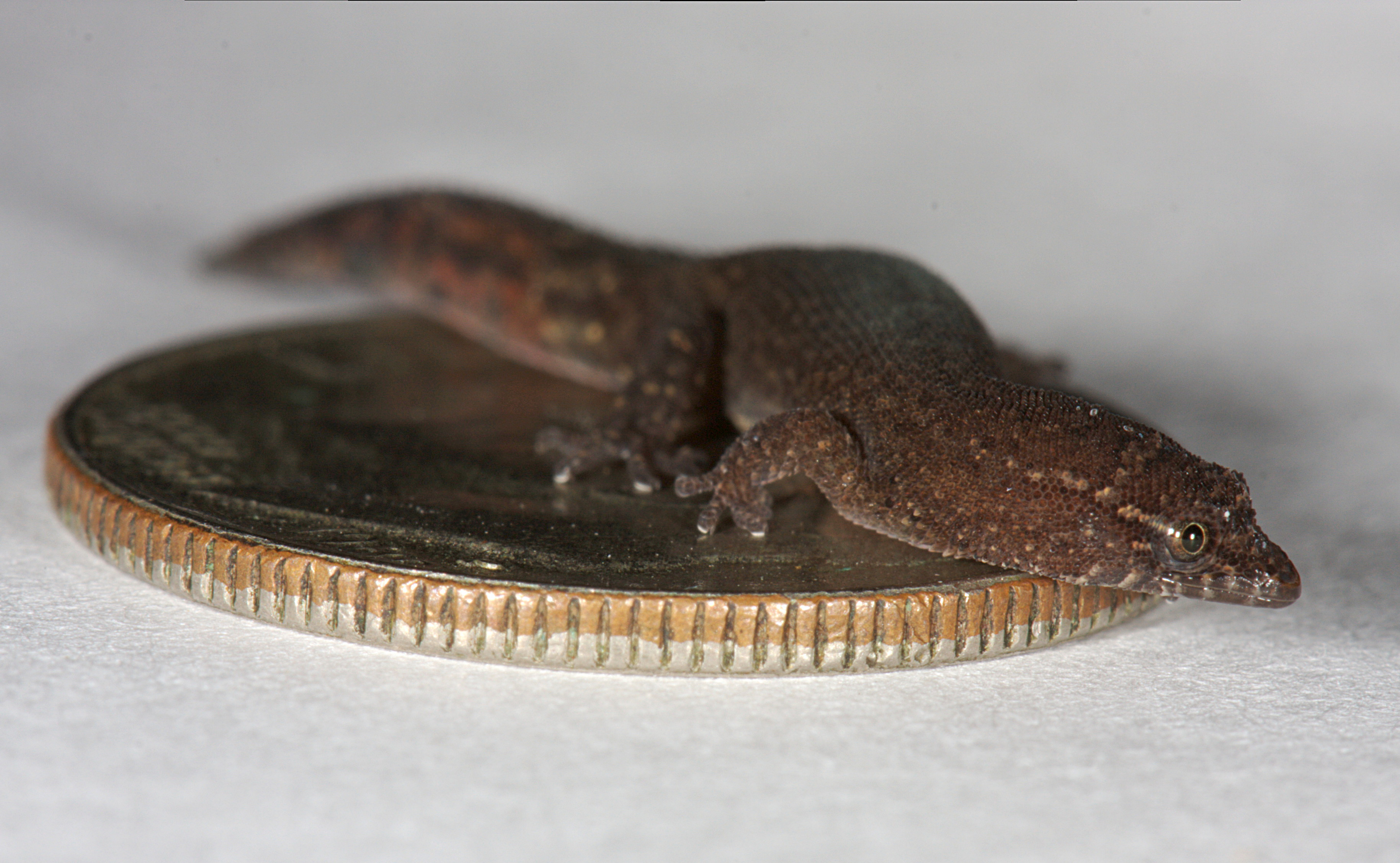
The Virgin Islands dwarf sphaero is nearly as small as a U.S. dime.

Typically, the species has a deep brown colouration on the dorsal side and legs, often with a scattering or a fine pattern of interconnected darker scales. The species has a preocular transverse bar (a line of coloured scales in front of the eyes at the base of the snout), although this can be hard to see in some individuals. Along each side and directly behind the eyes, a narrow, dark-edged, yellow-brown postocular stripe crosses the temple and fades out near the base of the head. In the occipital region, on top of the head behind the eyes, an almost oval-shaped, dark-edged, yellow-brown bar stretches from one side of the head to the other and sometimes connects with the postocular stripes. The dark brown scales on the dorsal side cross over to the ventral side (underside) and fade out, although many scales retain dark edges. The ventral side is light grey or cream. The tail is mostly yellowish-brown with occasional clusters or short lines of darker scales. The gular (throat) pattern has faint to bold lines of light scales running laterally.

There is no sexual dichromatism in this species (the sexes do not differ in colour), although females may be larger than males, with the SVL of females averaging 18 mm (0.71 in), but only 16 mm (0.63 in) in males. The snout is moderate in length and blunt. The tail regenerates if broken off.

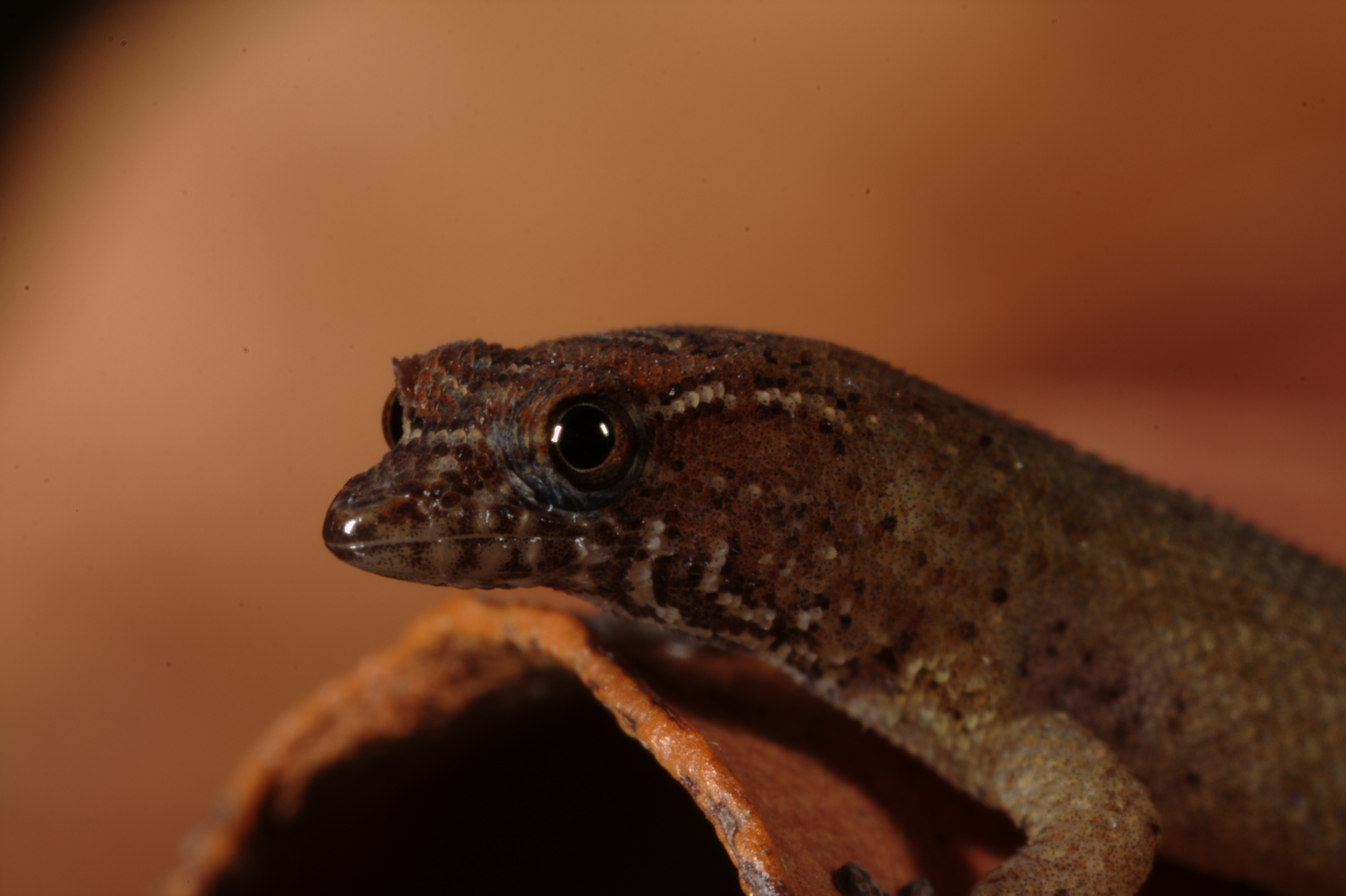
A yellow-brown stripe extends behind the eyes and over each temple, and then fades out at the base of the head.

The dorsal scales are generally small, acute, keeled, imbricate, and flattened, while the throat and pectoral (chest) scales are keeled. Granular (bumpy) scales are found on the top of the head and the anterior neck, while the scales on the middle of the neck are keeled, acute, flattened, and imbricate. In the middle of the back, there is some crowding and size reduction in the scales, and none of these scales are granular. On the dorsal side of the tail, the scales are acute, keeled, imbricate, and flattened. On the underside of the tail, the scales are smooth, rounded, and enlarged towards the centre of the tail (mid-ventrally). The ventral scales are rounded, smooth, cycloid (have a smooth outer edge), and imbricate. The scales on the ventral caudal (head) scales are smooth, cycloid, and enlarged mid-ventrally.

The count of dorsal scales, from axilla (armpit) to groin, averages 32 with a range of 30 to 35. The ventral count from axilla to groin along the midventral line averages 28 scales and ranges from 26 to 29. The scales around the midbody average approximately 52 and range from 50 to 55. There are two postnasals and one to three (usually two) internasal scales. There are two to three (usually three) scales from the upper lip to the eye (upper labials). On the fourth toe of the right foot, there are eight or nine (usually eight) lamellae, or plate-like scales that provide traction for geckos. The escutcheons (scales around the genital region) are relatively small and only slightly extend onto the thighs, varying from three to five scales in length and 11 to 13 scales in width.

=== Comparisons with related species ===
S. nicholsi from Puerto Rico is both bulkier and larger than the Virgin Islands dwarf sphaero, measuring 20 to 22 mm (0.8 to 0.9 in) from snout to vent. It also differs in the size of its dorsal scales, which is reflected in scale count comparisons. S. nicholsi has 19 to 24 dorsal scales from axilla to groin, whereas S. parthenopion has 30 to 35. Also, S. nicholsi has only 34 to 42 scales around the midbody compared to 50 to 55 in S. parthenopion, and its ventral scales from axilla to groin range from 21 to 26, which is still less than 26 to 29 in S. parthenopion. S. nicholsi typically has one internasal scale versus the two more commonly seen in S. parthenopion. The escutcheons are also larger in male S. nicholsi, on average. In terms of colouration, both species are very similar, but S. nicholsi usually has a crescent-shaped pattern on its head that touches the postocular stripes, instead of an oval-shaped pattern that may or may not reach the stripes. Also, its postocular stripes run the length of its body and tail instead of ending on the neck. The dorsolateral stripes of S. nicholsi converge to make a dark-edged U- or Y-shaped pattern in the sacral (pelvic) region. The majority of S. nicholsi have a pattern on the scapular (shoulder) region consisting of two small pale dots encompassed by small regions of black.

The big-scaled least gecko is significantly larger than the Virgin Islands dwarf sphaero, measuring 25 to 30 mm (0.98 to 1.18 in) from snout to vent. It also has larger, coarser scales. According to Thomas, "S. macrolepis has a pattern of dark lateral stripes and dorsal spotting on a tan or light brown ground color with a boldly black-edged pair of scapular spots (females) or a nearly uniform yellow-brown body color, weak or absent scapular pattern, and contrasting head pattern of black vermiculations [irregular wavy lines] on a grey ground color or unicolor yellow or orange heads (male)."

== Distribution and habitat ==
Originally found only on the island of Virgin Gorda, it has since been reported on Tortola and Mosquito Island. Its range is sometimes estimated to encompass the entire British Virgin Islands, although the original expedition by Thomas did not find any specimens on Tortola, Anegada, or other smaller islands, nor in the United States Virgin Islands of Saint Croix, Saint Thomas, and Saint John. Its distribution is considered unusual because despite being separated from its closest relative, S. nicholsi in Puerto Rico, another species, the Puerto Rican crested toad (Peltophryne lemur), has a geographic range that includes both islands, yet it has not diverged.

The Virgin Islands dwarf sphaero appears to favour dry (xeric) scrub forests—often mixed with cacti and thorny scrub—on rocky hillsides. It has been found at sea level, although not on the beach among the seaweed litter or in piles of rotting palm debris in the littoral zone, like the more abundant and larger big-scaled least gecko (S. macrolepis) with which it shares its range. Also unlike the big-scaled least gecko, they do not "swarm" in the leaf litter, but are only uncommonly found hiding under rocks, which are considered moist or mesic microhabitats within their dry ecological niche.

== Ecology and behaviour ==
As with other dwarf sphaeros, little is known about the ecology and behaviour of the Virgin Islands dwarf sphaero. Because of its high surface-area-to-volume ratio that results from its diminutive size, the species was thought to be susceptible to water loss, so it has been studied to understand how it survives in its semi-arid habitat. Unlike desert-dwelling lizards, the Virgin Islands dwarf sphaero lacks special adaptations to prevent desiccation and loses water at a rate similar to that of lizards from mesic habitats. From size differences alone, it loses water 70% faster than the larger and sympatric big-scaled least gecko. It survives instead by inhabiting humid microhabitats in its dry environment, by adjusting its reproductive cycle so that hatchlings emerge during the time of year with the highest precipitation, and by reducing activity during the driest parts of the day.

== Conservation ==
Too little data has been gathered to assess the population size and trend of the Virgin Islands dwarf sphaero. It has been reported as "moderately common", although difficult to find because of its size and ability to blend into its surroundings. Its distribution across the British Virgin Islands seems to be limited, and development may affect it further.

In early 2011, the Virgin Islands dwarf sphaero gained international attention when Sir Richard Branson announced plans to introduce lemurs—endangered primates from Madagascar—to Moskito Island as part of a captive breeding project for conservation purposes. Biologists, conservationists, and the general public quickly voiced concerns over the impact that would have on the native species of the island. In particular, people feared that the lemurs would wipe out the local population of Virgin Islands dwarf sphaeros, which was referred to as "one of the world's rarest lizards", because of the lemurs' "aggressive, omnivorous" behaviour. Other researchers instead focused on concerns about the lemurs' ability to thrive or the pathogens they might introduce. The leader of Branson's environmental impact assessment agreed that caution was needed with the introduction, even before the plans to introduce the lemurs were announced. Regarding the Virgin Islands dwarf sphaero, Branson stated that the concerns were misplaced because lemurs mostly eat plant material and would rarely eat geckos if at all. However, Branson ultimately backed down, stating, "I will keep the lemurs enclosed whilst we get experts to conduct further surveys on geckos and particularly the dwarf geckos. If these studies indicate any real risk to these geckos, we will keep the lemurs enclosed."
