= List of shipwrecks in October 1882 =

The list of shipwrecks in October 1882 includes ships sunk, foundered, grounded, or otherwise lost during October 1882.

== 1 October ==
List of shipwrecks: 1 October 1882
Ship	State	Description
Admiral	United Kingdom	The steam launch was wrecked in Loch Ewe.
Bendigo	United Kingdom	The steamship foundered in the Atlantic Ocean 140 nautical miles (260 km) west south west of the Tuskar Rock with the loss of two lives. She was on a voyage from Liverpool, Lancashire to Demerara, British Guiana.
Charles and Ellen	United Kingdom	The schooner was driven ashore and wrecked at Lochmaddy, North Uist, Outer Hebrides. Her crew were rescued. She was on a voyage from Iceland to Chester, Cheshire.
Curonia	Russia	The barque was severely damaged in a gale at "Laon", Ireland.
James Mandal	Norway	The schooner was wrecked at Thorshavn, Faroe Islands. Her crew were rescued.
Maria Stella	United Kingdom	The ship was driven ashore at Islandmagee, County Antrim. She was on a voyage from Ardglass, County Down to "Lochhorn".

== 2 October ==
List of shipwrecks: 2 October 1882
Ship	State	Description
Cora Maria	United Kingdom	The steamship was driven ashore near Reval, Russia. She was refloated and resumed her voyage.
Devock Water	United Kingdom	The ship was sighted in the Pacific Ocean whilst on a voyage from San Francisco, California, United States to Cape Town, Cape Colony. No further trace, reported overdue.
Ellen	United Kingdom	The barque was driven ashore at Stornoway, Isle of Lewis, Outer Hebrides.
Johannes Koster	Germany	The ship was driven ashore at Stornoway.
Lady Head	United Kingdom	The brig was driven ashore and wrecked at Stornoway. She was on a voyage from Arkhangelsk, Russia to Glasgow, Renfrewshire.
Rowena	United Kingdom	The ship was driven ashore at Stornoway. She was refloated with the assistance of a steamship.
Ocean Child	United Kingdom	The schooner foundered in Lough Swilly. Her crew were rescued.

== 3 October ==
List of shipwrecks: 3 October 1882
Ship	State	Description
Dan	Denmark	The steamship was driven ashore on Farø.
Maia	United Kingdom	The smack struck the pier and sank at Milford Haven, Pembrokeshire.
Pilot's Bride	United States	The schooner was wrecked on Desolation Island with the loss of 81 of her 85 crew. Survivors were rescued by Francis Allyn (United States).
Spey	United Kingdom	The steamship was driven ashore at "Selby", Öland, Sweden.

== 4 October ==
List of shipwrecks: 4 October 1882
Ship	State	Description
Nuova Savona	Italy	The ship was driven ashore and wrecked at San Antonio, Chile. Her crew were rescued.

== 5 October ==
List of shipwrecks: 5 October 1882
Ship	State	Description
Morocco	United Kingdom	The steamship was driven ashore at Patras, Greece. She was refloated on 7 October.

== 7 October ==
List of shipwrecks: 7 October 1882
Ship	State	Description
Louise	United Kingdom	The steamship ran aground at Port Glasgow, Renfrewshire. She was on a voyage from Glasgow, Renfrewshire to Liverpool, Lancashire. She was refloated and resumed her voyage.
Nive	United Kingdom	The schooner sprung a leak and foundered 8 miles (13 km) south-east of Penzance, Cornwall. Her four crew landed at Penzance in the ship's boat. She was on a voyage from Plymouth, Devon to Swansea, Glamorgan.

== 9 October ==
List of shipwrecks: 9 October 1882
Ship	State	Description
Balgairn	United Kingdom	The steamship was driven ashore and wrecked on Leversay Island, in the Sound of Benbecula. All on board were rescued. She was on her maiden voyage, from Aberdeen to Cardiff, Glamorgan.
Herder	Germany	The steamship was wrecked off Cape Race, Newfoundland Colony. All on board were rescued. She was on a voyage from New York, United States to Hamburg.
Phonoecian	United Kingdom	The steamship caught fire at New York. The fire was extinguished.

== 10 October ==
List of shipwrecks: 10 October 1882
Ship	State	Description
Elizabeth and Alice	United Kingdom	The fishing boat was run down and sunk in the River Thames at Blackwall, Middlesex by the steamship Recepta (Flag unknown). Her crew survived.
Helston	United Kingdom	The schooner was driven ashore 300 yards (270 m) north west of the Morte Stone, Devon.
Stanley Castle	United Kingdom	The steamship struck rocks and sank at Eyemouth, Berwickshire. Her crew were rescued.
Winston	United Kingdom	The steamship ran aground on the Carr Rocks. She was on a voyage from South Shields, County Durham to Dundee, Forfarshire. She was refloated and completed her voyage in a leaky condition.

== 11 October ==
List of shipwrecks: 11 October 1882
Ship	State	Description
Emily Jane	United Kingdom	The fishing smack collided with the steam hopper Alpha (United Kingdom) and sank in the Crosby Channel with the loss of her captain.
Lucinda	United Kingdom	The steamship sank at Ouistreham, Calvados, France.
Maria	Sweden	The brigantine ran aground on the Longsand, in the North Sea off the coast of Essex, United Kingdom. She was on a voyage from Sundsvall to the Cape of Good Hope, Cape Colony. She was refloated with the assistance of three smacks and taken in to Harwich, Essex in a severely leaky condition.
Nestor	United Kingdom	The ship ran aground off Bangor, County Antrim.
Sarah	United Kingdom	The schooner was driven ashore at Fairlie, Ayrshire. She was on a voyage from Gioia Tauro, Italy to Glasgow, Renfrewshire.
St. David	United States	The ship was damaged by fire at Liverpool, Lancashire, United Kingdom.
Tre Sostre	Denmark	The schooner was run down by Mourino. Tre Sostre was on a voyage from Örnsköldsvik, Sweden to Dieppe, Seine-Inférieure, France. She was towed in to Nexø, Denmark in a waterlogged condition.

== 12 October ==
List of shipwrecks: 12 October 1882
Ship	State	Description
Galloway	United Kingdom	The ship was driven ashore at Port Elizabeth, Cape Colony. She was on a voyage from Cardiff, Glamorgan to Port Elizabeth.

== 13 October ==
List of shipwrecks: 13 October 1882
Ship	State	Description
Preston	United Kingdom	The steamship ran ashore at Goswick, Northumberland. She was on a voyage from New York, United States to Newcastle upon Tyne, Northumberland.

== 14 October ==
List of shipwrecks: 14 October 1882
Ship	State	Description
Frankfurt	Germany	The steamship caught fire at Bremen. The fire was exitnguished the next day.
Red Star	United Kingdom	The steamship sank in the Danube at Sulina, Romania with the loss of all but four of her crew.

== 15 October ==
List of shipwrecks: 15 October 1882
Ship	State	Description
Christian	Denmark	The schooner collided with Greenock (United Kingdom) in the English Channel off the coast of Sussex, United Kingdom and was severely damaged. Her crew were taken off by Greenock. Christian was on a voyage from Dieppe, Seine-Inférieure, France to Holbæk. She was taken in to by the steamship Stannington (United Kingdom), bound for London, United Kingdom.
Fortuna	Norway	The barque was abandoned in the North Sea off the coast of Aberdeenshire, United Kingdom. Her ten crew were rescued by the Peteread Lifeboat. Fortuna was on a voyage from Aberdeen to Arendal. She cames ashore at Scotstoun Head, Aberdeenshire and was wrecked.
Volharding	Flag unknown	The ship was wrecked on the Caicos Bank. Her crew were rescued. She was on a voyage from Monte Cristo, San Domingo to Falmouth, Cornwall, United Kingdom.

== 16 October ==
List of shipwrecks: 16 October 1882
Ship	State	Description
Bremen	United Kingdom	The full-rigged ship ran ashore on the Farallone Islands, California, United States during a thick fog and was wrecked. Her crew were rescued. She was on a voyage from Liverpool, Lancashire to San Francisco, California, United States.
City of Antwerp, and Constantia	United Kingdom; Germany	The steamship City of Antwerp and the full-rigged ship Constantia collided 14 nautical miles (26 km) off the Eddystone Lighthouse, Cornwall and both ship foundered. The steamship St. Jean (France) rescued four crew of City of Antwerp and the crew of Constantia. City of Antwerp was on a voyage from Workington, Cumberland to Antwerp, Belgium. Constantia was on a voyage from Bremen to New Orleans, Louisiana, United States
John and Edward	United Kingdom	The smack collided with the barque Fix (Norway) and sank in the North Sea. Her crew were rescued by Fix.
Kelso	United Kingdom	The schooner collided with Finzal (United Kingdom) off the Tuskar Rock and was abandoned. Her crew were rescued.
Lennox	United Kingdom	The barque caught fire in the South Atlantic on a voyage from Dundee, Forfarshire to San Francisco, California with coal; after increased fire and explosions, Lennox was abandoned on 18 October.
Vulcan	United Kingdom	The steamship was driven ashore and wrecked at Seafield Vows, near Kirkcaldy, Fife with the loss of five of the fourteen people on board. She was on a voyage from Middlesbrough, Yorkshire to Grangemouth, Stirlingshire.

== 17 October ==
List of shipwrecks: 17 October 1882
Ship	State	Description
Eliza	United Kingdom	The sloop was abandoned in the Irish Sea off Blackpool, Lancashire. She was on a voyage from Fleetwood, Lancashire to Amlwch, Anglesey.

== 18 October ==
List of shipwrecks: 18 October 1882
Ship	State	Description
Caroline	Netherlands	The ship departed from Northfleet, Kent, United Kingdom for Riga, Russia. No further trace, reported missing.
Clan Stuart	United Kingdom	The steamship was driven ashore 30 nautical miles (56 km) east of Perim, Aden Settlement. Shew as on a voyagage from Kurrachee, India to Liverpool, Lancashire.
William Cory	United Kingdom	The ship was driven ashore at Cape Kefalos, Imbros, Ottoman Empire. She was on a voyage from Dedeagatch, Greece to London. She was refloated and resumed her voyage.

== 19 October ==
List of shipwrecks: 19 October 1882
Ship	State	Description
Bob Chalmers	United Kingdom	The tug was driven ashore at "Fontigaray", Glamorgan.
Lydia Varwell	United Kingdom	The schooner was wrecked at Maranhão, Brazil. She was on a voyage from Cardiff, Glamorga to Maranhão.
Meervestroom	Netherlands	The ship sprang a leak and foundered 12 nautical miles (22 km) off Bolt Head, Devon, United Kingdom. Her crew were rescued by the fishing trawler Minnie (United Kingdom). Meervestroom was on a voyage from Dordrecht, South Hollan to Liverpool, Lancashire, United Kingdom.
Sidonian	United Kingdom	The steamship ran aground west of Morte Point, Devon. She was on a voyage from New York, United States to Avonmouth, Somerset. She was refloated and completed her voyage.
St. George	United Kingdom	The brig was driven ashore near Ballywalter, County Antrim. Her nine crew were rescued by the Ballywalter Lifeboat. She was on a voyage from Maryport, Cumberland to Doboy, Georgia, United States.

== 20 October ==
List of shipwrecks: 20 October 1882
Ship	State	Description
Acastus	United Kingdom	The ship departed from Hartlepool, County Durham for Whitstable, Kent. No further trace, reported missing.
Equity	United Kingdom	The schooner foundered in the North Sea 6 nautical miles (11 km) east of Peterhead, Aberdeenshire. Her crew survived. She was on a voyage from Sunderland, County Durham to Gardenstown, Aberdeenshire.
Nellie	United Kingdom	The brigantine was wrecked at Maranhão, Brazil. She was on a voyage from Swansea, Glamorgan to Maranhão.
Star of the West	United States	The ship departed from New York for Bremen, Germany. No further trace, reported missing.
Victory	United Kingdom	The schooner sank near Ballyteigue, County Clare with the loss of all hands. She was on a voyage from Cardiff, Glamorgan to Waterford.

== 21 October ==
List of shipwrecks: 21 October 1882
Ship	State	Description
Alice	(United Kingdom of Great Britain and Ireland) Guernsey	The ship departed from South Shields, County Durham for London. No further trace, reported missing.
Helen Richards	United Kingdom	The ship departed from Sunderland, County Durham for Littlehampton, Sussex. No further trace, reported missing.
Oranmore	United Kingdom	The ship ran aground at Barrow-in-Furness, Lancashire. She was on a voyage from Liverpool, Lancashire to Baltimore, Maryland, United States. She was refloated and taken in to Barrow-in-Furness.
Paria	United Kingdom	The ship departed from the River Tyne for Genoa, Italy. No further trace, reported missing.
Una	United Kingdom	The steamship was driven ashore on Naissaar, Russia. She was on a voyage from Hull, Yorkshire to Reval, Russia.
Unnamed	Germany	The fishing smack collided with the schooner Zoe (United Kingdom) and sank.

== 22 October ==
List of shipwrecks: 22 October 1882
Ship	State	Description
Circassian	United Kingdom	The ship departed from South Shields, County Durham for Littlehampton, Sussex. No further trace, reported missing.
Kyanite	(United Kingdom of Great Britain and Ireland) Guernsey	The ship departed from South Shields for Guernsey. No further trace, reported missing.

== 23 October ==
List of shipwrecks: 23 October 1882
Ship	State	Description
Anna Weigman	Germany	The ship dearted from Newcastle upon Tyne, Northumberland, United Kingdom for Riga, Russia. No further trace, reported missing.
Hawendale	United Kingdom	The ship departed from Newcastle upon Tyne for New Ross, County Wexford. No further trace, reported missing.
Lord Nelson	United Kingdom	The steamship was sighted off Gibraltar whilst on a voyage from Odesa, Russia to Antwerp, Belgium. No further trace, reported missing.
Otto Lichinans	Germany	The steamship departed from Blyth, Northumberland for Hamburg. No further trace, reported missing.
Paladin	United Kingdom	The steamship was wrecked in the Paracel Islands. All on board were rescued. She was on a voyage from Saigon, French Indo-China to Hong Kong.
Tweed	United Kingdom	The ship departed from Hartlepool, County Durham for London. No further trace, reported missing.

== 24 October ==
List of shipwrecks: 24 October 1882
Ship	State	Description
Active	United Kingdom	The schooner was driven ashore at Corton, Suffolk. Her five crew were rescued by rocket apparatus. She was on a voyage from Stettin, Germany to Ghent, East Flanders, Belgium. Active was refloated with the assistance of the tug Despatch (United Kingdom) and taken in to Lowestoft, Suffolk.
Adventure	United Kingdom	The ship ran aground on the Holm Sand, in the North Sea off the coast of Suffolk. She was refloated and taken in to Great Yarmouth, Norfolk.
Air	United Kingdom	The schooner was driven ashore at Blakeney, Norfolk.
Arab	United Kingdom	The yacht ran aground on the Goodwin Sands, Kent. All nine people on board were rescued by the Ramsgate Lifeboat Bradford ( Royal National Lifeboat Institution), assisted by the tug Aid (United Kingdom).
Ariel	United Kingdom	The barque was wrecked on Scroby Sands, Norfolk with the loss of all hands.
Dorothea	Denmark	The schooner was abandoned in the North Sea. Her crew were rescued. She was on a voyage from Leven, Fife, United Kingdom to Esbjerg.
Glencoe	United Kingdom	The brigantine was wrecked on the Shipwash Sand, in the North Sea off the coast of Suffolk with the loss of all but her captain. He was rescued by the Ketch Forager (United Kingdom). Glencoe was on a voyage from Hartlepool, County Durham to Burham, Kent.
Frisk	Norway	The barque was abandoned off the coast of Sussex, United Kingdom. Her thirteen crew survived. Frisk was on a voyage from Miramichi, New Brunswick, Canada to Grimsby, Lincolnshire, United Kingdom. She came ashore at Crowlink, Sussex and was wrecked.
Gerarda	United Kingdom	The steamship collided with Benares (United Kingdom) and sank in the English Channel 15 nautical miles (28 km) off St. Catherine's Point, Isle of Wight with the loss of nine of her 23 crew. Survivors were rescued by Benares. Gerarda was on a voyage from Newcastle upon Tyne, Northumberland to Genoa, Italy.
Helen Richards	United Kingdom	The brig foundered with the loss of all hands. She was on a voyage from Sunderland, County Durham to Littlehampton, Sussex.
Meridian	United Kingdom	The fishing boat was driven ashore and wrecked at Great Yarmouth. Her crew were rescued by rocket apparatus.
Nidaros	Norway	The barque was abandoned off "Jedderen". Her crew were rescued. She was on a voyage from Hull, Yorkshire, United Kingdom to Arendal. She was subsequently taken in to Tanager, Denmark.
North Star	United Kingdom	The barge sank at Chichester, Sussex with the loss of two lives.
Rambler	United Kingdom	The schooner was driven onto a sandbank off Slaughden, Suffolk with the loss of one of her five crew. Survivors were rescued by the Aldeburgh Lifeboat.
Runo	United Kingdom	The steamship ran aground in the Thames Estuary off Southend, Essex.
Unnamed	Flag unknown	A barque was driven ashore at Corton, Suffolk with the loss of all hands, twelve or thirteen lives.
Two unnamed vessels	Flags unknown	Two schooners were driven ashore at Lowestoft during a storm.
Seven unnamed vessels	Flags unknown	The vesses were wrecked at Ryde, Isle of Wight, United Kingdom.

== 25 October ==
List of shipwrecks: 25 October 1882
Ship	State	Description
Absolut Veot	Denmark	The ship was abandoned in the North Sea 50 nautical miles (93 km) east of Lowestoft, Suffolk, United Kingdom. Her crew were rescued by the smack Red Rose (United Kingdom). Absolut Veto was on a voyage from "Hernos" to Bordeaux, Gironde, France. She was subsequently towed in to the Nieuwe Diep.
Comet	United Kingdom	The schooner was abandoned in the North Sea 30 nautical miles (56 km) off Great Yarmouth, Norfolk. Her crew were rescued by the lugger Warrior (United Kingdom). Comet was on a voyage from Sunderland, County Durham to Teignmouth, Devon.
Crystal	United Kingdom	The ship was wrecked on the Mouse Sand, in the Thames Estuary. Her crew were rescued by the tug Rescue (United Kingdom). Crystal was on a voyage from Portsmouth, Hampshire to Hull, Yorkshire.
Eliza	United Kingdom	The fishing smack was driven ashore at Holkham, Norfolk.
Hannah	United Kingdom	The ship foundered in the North Sea 30 nautical miles (56 km) south east of the mouth of the Humber with the loss of all but her captain. She was on a voyage from Wells-next-the-Sea, Norfolk to Newcastle upon Tyne, Northumberland.
Irene	Austria-Hungary	The barque sank at Dunkirk, Nord, France. She was on a voyage from Algiers, Algeria to Dunkirk. She was refloated and towd in to Dunkirk.
Jane	United Kingdom	The ship was abandoned in the North Sea 16 nautical miles (30 km) north north west of Scheveningen, South Holland, Netherlands. Her crew were rescued by the pilot boat No. 45 (Netherlands). Jane was on a voyage from Newcastle upon Tyne to Dordrecht, South Holland.
Let Me Alone	United Kingdom	The schooner was driven ashore and wrecked at Northcote's Point, Lincolnshire.
Mohongo	Sweden	The barque was abandoned in the North Sea 40 nautical miles (74 km) off the Lemon Sand. Her crew were rescued by the fishing smack Paramatta (United Kingdom). Mohongo was on a voyage from Sundsvall to L'Orient, Morbihan, France.
Nelson	United Kingdom	The ship was abandoned on the Noord Hinder, in the North Sea off the coast of Zeeland, Netherlands. Her crew were rescued by a Dutch pilot boat. She was on a voyage from Sunderland to Valparaíso, Chile.
Rapid	United Kingdom	The ship ran aground on the Ouse Sand, in the Thames Estuary. She was refloated with assistance from the tug Rescue (United Kingdom) and towed in to Sheerness, Kent.
Sleipner	Denmark	The brig was run down and sunk in the North Sea. Her crew were rescued by Victoria (United Kingdom). Sleipner was on a voyage from Dysart, Fife, United Kingdom to Svendborg.
Undine	Germany	The brig was abandoned in the North Sea 50 nautical miles (93 km) east of Lowestoft. Her crew were rescued by the smack Gratitude (United Kingdom).
Victoria	Germany	The barque was abandoned in the North Sea 30 nautical miles (56 km) north west by north of IJmuiden, North Holland, Netherlands.
Wards	United Kingdom	The ship departed from Hartlepool, County Durham for London. No further trace, reported missing.

== 26 October ==
List of shipwrecks: 26 October 1882
Ship	State	Description
Duen	Norway	The schooner was abandoned in the North Sea. Her crew were rescued. She was on a voyage from Rouen, Seine-Inférieure, France to Fredrikshald.
Nestor, and Wega	United Kingdom; Germany	The steamship Nestor collided with the steamship Wega and sank at Cuxhaven, Germany. Both vessels were on a voyage from Hamburg to London. Wega was beached.
Sarah Louise	United Kingdom	The ship foundered in the North Sea. Her seven crew were rescued. She was on a voyage from Hartlepool, County Durham to Shoreham-by-Sea, Sussex.

== 27 October ==
List of shipwrecks: 27 October 1882
Ship	State	Description
China	Germany	The barque was driven ashore on Skagen, Denmark.
Eliza Augusta Pron	France	The schooner was abandoned in the North Sea with the loss of her captain. She was on a voyage from Luleå, Sweden to "Benic".
J. L.	France	The brig was driven ashore and wrecked at "San Fella". Her crew were rescued.
Lynher	United Kingdom	The brigantine was discovered off the Docking Sand in The Wash by the smack Foreman ( Trinity House ). She was towed in to King's Lynn, Norfolk by the tug Spindrift (United Kingdom).
Manitoban	United Kingdom	The steamship ran aground in the Clyde off Garvel Point, Renfrewshire.
Maria	Portugal	The barque was abandoned in the North Sea. Her crew were rescued by the smack Renown (United Kingdom). Maria was on a voyage from Porto to South Shields, County Durham, United Kingdom.
Wilton	United Kingdom	The steamship was driven ashore on Skagen.
Unnamed	Flag unknown	The steamship foundered in the Atlantic Ocean (45°50′N 7°45′W). Witnessed by the steamship Hamburg (Germany).

== 28 October ==
List of shipwrecks: 28 October 1882
Ship	State	Description
Andrich	Austria-Hungary	The ship was driven ashore and wrecked at Fiume.
Anna	United Kingdom	The ship was wrecked off Lowestoft, Suffolk with the loss of all hands. She was on a voyage from Arkhangelsk, Russia to Bristol, Gloucestershire.
Arfacsad	Austria-Hungary	The ship was driven ashore and wrecked at Fiume.
Commendatore Tonello	Austria-Hungary	The ship was driven ashore and wrecked at Fiume.
Dunal	Austria-Hungary	The ship was driven ashore and wrecked at Fiume.
Equivalent	United Kingdom	The ship foundered off Great Yarmouth, Norfolk. Her crew were rescued the next day by Lady Francis (United Kingdom). Equivalent was on a voyage from Sunderland, County Durham to Rye, Sussex.
Isis	United Kingdom	The ship was wrecked at Lowestoft with the loss of three of her crew. Survivors were rescued by the Lowestoft Lifeboat. She was on a voyage from Hartlepool, County Durham to Cowes, Isle of Wight.
Messenger	United Kingdom	The brig was driven ashore and wrecked at Lowestoft. All fifteen people on board were rescued by rocket apparatus.
Mornington	United Kingdom	The brig was wrecked at Lowestoft. All sixteen people on board were rescued by the Lowestoft Lifeboat. She was on a voyage from South Shields, County Durham to Dordrecht, South Holland, Netherlands.
Morning Star	United Kingdom	The steamship was wrecked at Vieux-Boucau-les-Bains, Landes, France. Fourteen crew were rescued, two were reported missing. She was on a voyage from Bilbao, Spain to Rotterdam, South Holland.
Q. E. D.	United Kingdom	The ship was driven ashore at Lowestoft.
Rudolph Wetzel	United States	The tug exploded and sank 15 miles (24 km) from Racine, Wisconsin, about 2 miles (3.2 km) offshore. Lost with all three hands.
Runo, and Warrior Queen	United Kingdom	The brig Runo collided with the brig Warrior Queen and sank off Great Yarmouth, Norfolk. Her crew were rescued. Runo was on a voyage from South Shields to Fécamp, Seine-Inférieure, France. 'Warrior Queen was abandoned off Southwold, Suffolk in a sinking condition. Her eight crew took to a boat; but seven of them drowned when it capsized.
Seaham	United Kingdom	The ship was wrecked at Kessingland, Suffolk. Her crew were rescued by rocket apparatus. She was on a voyage from Hartlepool to Portsmouth, Hampshire.
Secret	United Kingdom	The ship was wrecked at Kessingland with the loss of all but one of her crew. She was on a voyage from Hartlepool to Plymouth, Devon.
Susannah Dixon	United Kingdom	The ship was driven ashore and wrecked at Lowestoft. Her eight crew were rescued by Mornington (United Kingdom). Susannah Dixon was on a voyage from South Shields to Trouville-sur-Mer, Manche, France.
Unnamed	Flag unknown	The ship was driven ashore and wrecked at Pakefield, Suffolk. Five crew were rescued by rocket apparatus.
Several unnamed vessels	Flags unknown	Three or four ships were driven ashore at Lowestoft.
Unnamed	Flag unknown	The schooner was driven ashore and wrecked at Corton, Suffolk with the loss of all hands.

== 29 October ==
List of shipwrecks: 29 October 1882
Ship	State	Description
Alma	United Kingdom	The schooner was driven ashore at Lowestoft, Suffolk. Her crew were rescued.
Diligence	United Kingdom	The barque was driven ashore in the River Erme.
Duquesne	France	The brig was driven ashore at Ossby, Öland, Sweden. She was on a voyage from Riga, Russia to Honfleur, Manche.

== 30 October ==
List of shipwrecks: 30 October 1882
Ship	State	Description
Bride	United Kingdom	The steamship was driven ashore at "Holmetunge", Denmark.
Levi G. Burgess	United States	The full-rigged ship ran aground on the Chequer Shoal, in the Humber. She was on a voyage from. Hull, Yorkshire, United Kingdom to San Francisco, California. She was refloated and towed back to Hull by two tugs.
William and Eliza	United Kingdom	The ship was driven ashore and wrecked at Milford Haven, Pembrokeshire.
William and Eliza	United Kingdom	The smack was wrecked at Hurst Castle, Hampshire. Her three crew survived.

== 31 October ==
List of shipwrecks: 31 October 1882
Ship	State	Description
Ortelius	Sweden	The brig was wrecked at Högänas.
Pax	Germany	The galiot was driven ashore at Lemvig, Denmark. Her crew were rescued. She was on a voyage from Morrisonhaven, Scotland to Lemvig.
Ste Marie Joseph	France	The ketch was driven ashore and wrecked at Lydd, Kent, United Kingdom. Her crew were rescued by the Coastguard.

== Unknown date ==
List of shipwrecks: Unknown date in October 1882
Ship	State	Description
Alfen	Flag unknown	The ship ran aground on the Lillegrund, in the Baltic Sea. She was later refloated and taken in to Copenhagen, Denmark for repairs.
Anna	France	The barque was driven ashore at Copenhagen. She was on a voyage from Hudiksvall, Sweden to Bayonne, Loire-Inférieure, France.
Antonia Casabona	Italy	The barque ran aground on the Pink Rock, in the River Barrow. She was on a voyage from Philadelphia, Pennsylvania, United States to New Ross, County Wexford, United Kingdom. She was refloated with the assistance of the steamship Ida (United Kingdom).
Auguste	Denmark	The ship was lost in the Pescadores before 11 October. Her crew were rescued.
Beatrice	Germany	The brig foundered in the North Sea. Her crew were rescued by the fishing smack Orcadia (United Kingdom). Beatrice was on a voyage from Hartlepool, County Durham, United Kingdom to Stralsund.
Bolgdeg	Norway	The barque was wrecked on Cape Sable Island, Nova Scotia, Canada. Her crew were rescued. She was on a voyage from London, United Kingdom to New York, United States.
Borntand	Norway	The ship was driven ashore 30 nautical miles (56 km) north of Bayonne, Loire-Inférieure, France. Her crew were rescued.
Cambrian	France	The steamship sank. Her crew were rescued by the steamship Ixia (United Kingdom).
Carolina	Sweden	The schooner was driven ashore on Saltholmen, Denmark. She was on a voyage from an English port to Ystad.
Catarina V	Flag unknown	The ship was wrecked at Cap-Haïtien, Haiti. She was on a voyage from the Cape of Good Hope, Cape Colony to Pensacola, Florida, United States.
Chrysolite	United Kingdom	The steamship was driven ashore at San Stefano, Ottoman Empire. She was on a vohyage from Cardiff, Glamorgan to Sulina, Romania.
Clan Gordon	United Kingdom	The steamship was wrecked at Mauritius. All on board were rescued, but a rescuer was drowned.
Elizabeth	United Kingdom	The schooner was driven ashore in The Swale.
Enricho P.	Italy	The barque was abandoned in the Atlantic Ocean before 8 October. She was on a voyage from Pensacola to Genoa.
Gallant	United Kingdom	The schooner was driven ashore on Hirsholmene, Denmark. She was on a voyage from Rotterdam, South Holland, Netherlands to Randers, Norway.
Germania	Germany	The schooner was wrecked on the coast of Iceland. At least three of her crew survived.
Gordonia	United Kingdom	The ship was driven ashore north of the Tobruchin Lighthouse, Russia.
Govina	United Kingdom	The steamship was driven ashore near Sheringham, Norfolk. She was on a voyage from Sunderland, County Durham to London. She was refloated on 10 October and resumed her voyage the next day.
Gulf of Panama	United Kingdom	The steamship was wrecked on the Zuider Haaks, off Texel, North Holland, Netherlands with the loss of 22 of her crew. She was on a voyage from Japan to Bremen, Germany.
Hawk	United Kingdom	The steam trawler was driven ashore on the Isle of May, Fife. She was refloated, and was towed in to the Firth of Forth by Douglas (United Kingdom).
Hesperia	Norway	The barque was wrecked at Santana, Brazil. She was on a voyage from Hamburg, Germany to Maceió, Brazil.
Janus	Norway	The schooner was wrecked on the coast of Iceland. At least three of her crew survived.
Kate	United Kingdom	The ship was driven ashore near Ballinskelligs, County Kerry.
Launceston	United Kingdom	The brigantine was driveh ashore at Lowestoft, Suffolk. Her crew survived. She was on a voyage from Middlesbrough, Yorkshire to Newport, Monmouthshire.
Light and Sign	United Kingdom	The brig was driven ashore and wrecked at Sea Palling, Norfolk with the loss of all hands, at least four lives. She was on a voyage from Sunderland to Rochester, Kent.
Magnet	Denmark	The schooner was wrecked on the coast of Iceland. At least two of her crew survives.
Mantura	United Kingdom	The schooner sank at Bangor.
Manuella	Spain	The ship foundered at sea. Her crew were rescued by the steamship Don Pedro (France).
Melville	Canada	The barque was wrecked on Vancouver Island, British Columbia with the loss of all hands. She was on a voyage from Shanghai, China to Victoria, British Columbia.
Mimi	Germany	The schooner foundered at sea. Her crew were rescued by a pilot schooner. She was on a voyage from Plymouth, Devon, United Kingdom to Harburg.
Morning Star	United Kingdom	The steamship was driven ashore 30 nautical miles (56 km) north of Bayonne. Her crew were rescued.
Muisto	Russia	The barque was driven ashore at Segerstrand, Öland, Sweden. She was on a voyage from Raumo, Finland to Barcelona, Spain.
Norden	Norway	The steamship was driven ashore on Saltholm, Denmark. She was on a voyage from Helsingør, Denmark to a Baltic port.
Notre Dame de Salut	France	The ship was wrecked at Cherbourg, Manche. Her crew were rescued.
Penang	United States	The ship was wrecked on Sandy Cay. she was on a voyage from Pensacola, Florida to Buenos Aires, Argentina.
Posthumous	Norway	The barque was abandoned in the North Sea. Her crew were rescued by the full-rigged ship Bernardres (Netherlands). Posthumous was on a voyage from Sunderland to Helsingør.
Providence	United Kingdom	The barque was driven ashore in the Nieuwe Diep. She was on a voyage from Havre de Grâce, Seine-Inférieure, France to a Baltic port.
Robert	German Empire	The ship was driven ashore and wrecked on Scharhörn. She was on a voyage from Fraserburgh, Aberdeenshire to Harburg, Prussia.
Salem	United Kingdom	The schooner sprang a leak and was beached at Milford Haven, Pembrokeshire. She was on a voyage from Portmadoc, Caernarfonshire to Hamburg.
Sallie	United Kingdom	The steamship was driven ashore at Maassluis, South Holland. She was on a voyage from Bilbao, Spain to Rotterdam.
Sovereign	United Kingdom	The ship was wrecked on the Newcombe Sand, in the North Sea off the coast of Suffolk. Her crew were rescued. She was on a voyage from Seaham, County Durham to Portsmouth, Hampshire.
Victoria	Germany	The ship was abandoned in the North Sea with the loss of eight of her ten crew. She was on a voyage from Danzig to Saint Lucia.
Wambe	Flag unknown	The steamship sank 45 nautical miles (83 km) to the north of the Juan de Fuca Strait with the loss of all on board, several hundred lives. She was on a voyage from Hong Kong to Victoria, British Columbia, Canada.
Wilhelm Kragh	Denmark	The ship was driven ashore and wrecked near Ystad, Sweden. Her crew were rescued.
Seven unnamed vessels	Flags unknown	A waterspout at Saint-Raphaël, Var, France destroyed seven brigantines in the port.
Unnamed	Flag unknown	The barque was driven ashore in Loch Boisdale.
Unnamed	Netherlands	The brig was driven ashore and wrecked at Bordeaux, Gironde, France.
Unnamed	France	The fishing boat foundered off Marseille, Bouches-du-Rhône with the loss of two lives.
