= Great Dog Island =

Islet in the Caribbean

- The location of Great Dog Island within the British Virgin Islands

- Location within British Virgin Islands Location within the Caribbean

Geography
- Location: Caribbean Sea
- Coordinates: 18.4829°N 64.4573°W
- Archipelago: Virgin Islands

Administration
- United Kingdom
- British Overseas Territory: British Virgin Islands

Demographics
- Population: 0

Additional information
- Time zone: AST (UTC-4)
- ISO code: VG

Great Dog Island is an uninhabited islet of the British Virgin Islands in the Caribbean. It is located in a smaller sub-group of islands referred to as the Dog Islands, or more commonly, "The Dogs". Other islets in The Dogs include Little Seal Dog Island, East Seal Dog Island, West Dog Island and George Dog Island, all of which are to the northwest of Virgin Gorda.

On the south side of the island, an old Air BVI aircraft has been deliberately sunk as a dive site for recreational divers. Although the plane no longer has its wings, the emergency oxygen masks are still hanging from the roof, after being released during the plane's unfortunate last landing (on water, in 1993 on a failed take off).

The island provides habitat for the crested anole (Anolis cristatellus wileyae), the Virgin Islands coqui (Eleutherodactylus schwartzi), and the big-scaled least gecko (Sphaerodactylus macrolepis macrolepis).
