= Great Dog (disambiguation) =

Great Dog or Canis Major is a constellation.

Great Dog may also refer to:

- Great Dog Island, an island in the British Virgin Islands
- Great Dog Island (Tasmania)
