= Little Camanoe =

Island in the British Virgin Islands

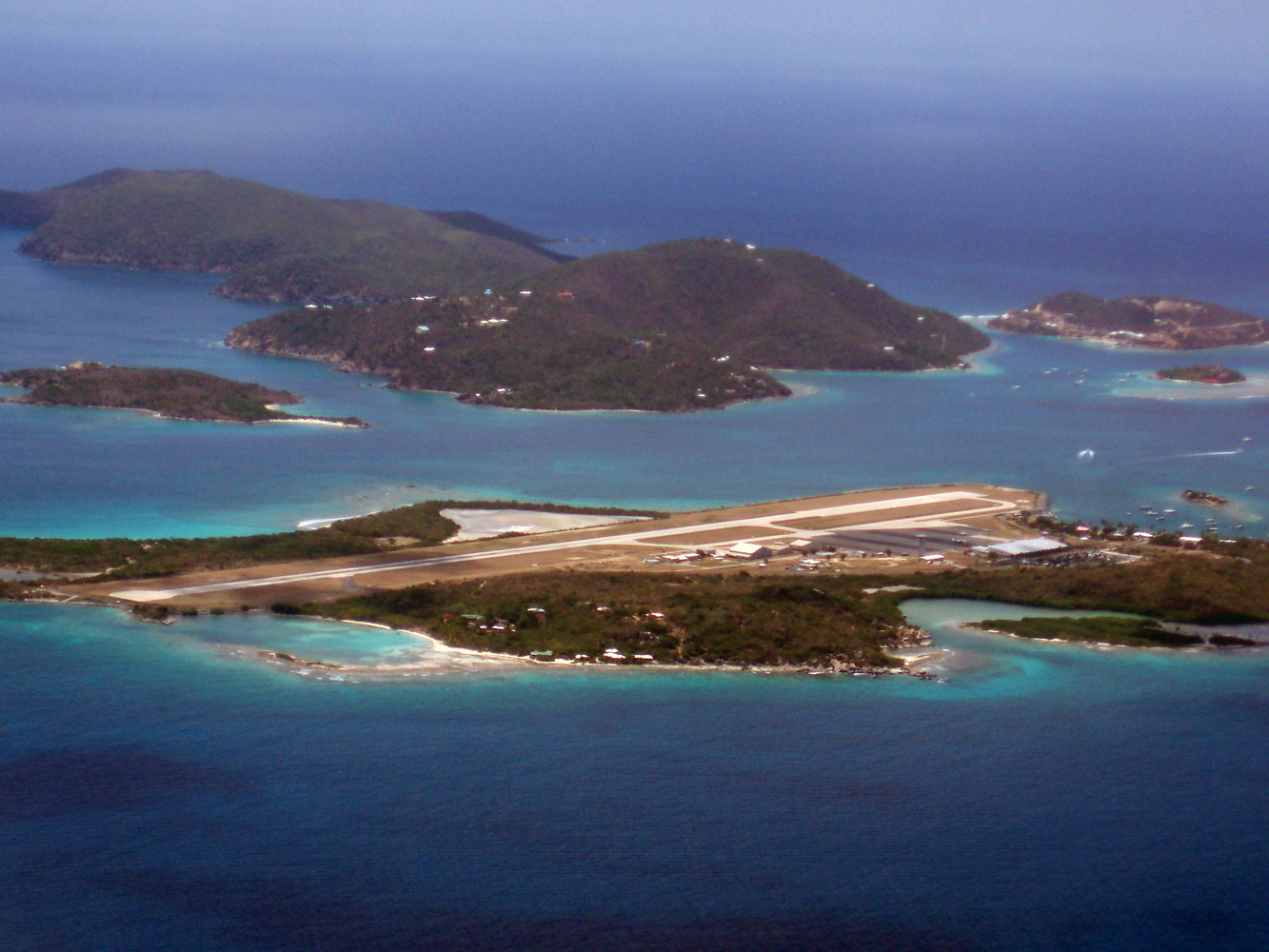
- Little Camano is to the mid-left, behind Tortola airport's runway

- The location of Little Camanoe within the British Virgin Islands

- Location within British Virgin Islands Location within the Caribbean

Geography
- Location: Caribbean Sea
- Coordinates: 18.4589°N 64.5427°W
- Archipelago: Virgin Islands

Administration
- United Kingdom
- British Overseas Territory: British Virgin Islands

Additional information
- Time zone: AST (UTC-4)
- ISO code: VG

Little Camanoe is an uninhabited island of the British Virgin Islands in the Caribbean.

The island provides habitat for the common Puerto Rican ameiva (Ameiva exsul), the crested anole (Anolis cristatellus wileyae), and the big-scaled least gecko (Sphaerodactylus macrolepis macrolepis).
