= Stanlow =

Stanlow may refer to:

- Stanlow Island
- Stanlow Oil Refinery
- Stanlow Abbey
- Stanlow and Thornton railway station
- "Stanlow", a song by Orchestral Manoeuvres in the Dark from Organisation
