= Florence Rock =

Rock in the South Orkney Islands, Antarctica

- Location within Antarctica

Geography
- Location: Antarctica
- Coordinates: 60°47′S 44°36′W
- Archipelago: South Orkney Islands

Florence Rock (60°47′S 44°36′W) is a rock 0.1 nautical miles (200 m) long with a smaller rock off its northeast end, lying 0.8 nautical miles (1.5 km) southwest of Cape Anderson, off the south coast of Laurie Island in the South Orkney Islands. It was charted and named by the Scottish National Antarctic Expedition, 1902–04, led by W.S. Bruce.

It is probable that Bruce named Florence Rock after Edwin Florence, chief cook on the expedition ship the Scotia, who was promoted to first steward in Buenos Aires in January 1904.
