= Green Cay =

One of the British Virgin Islands

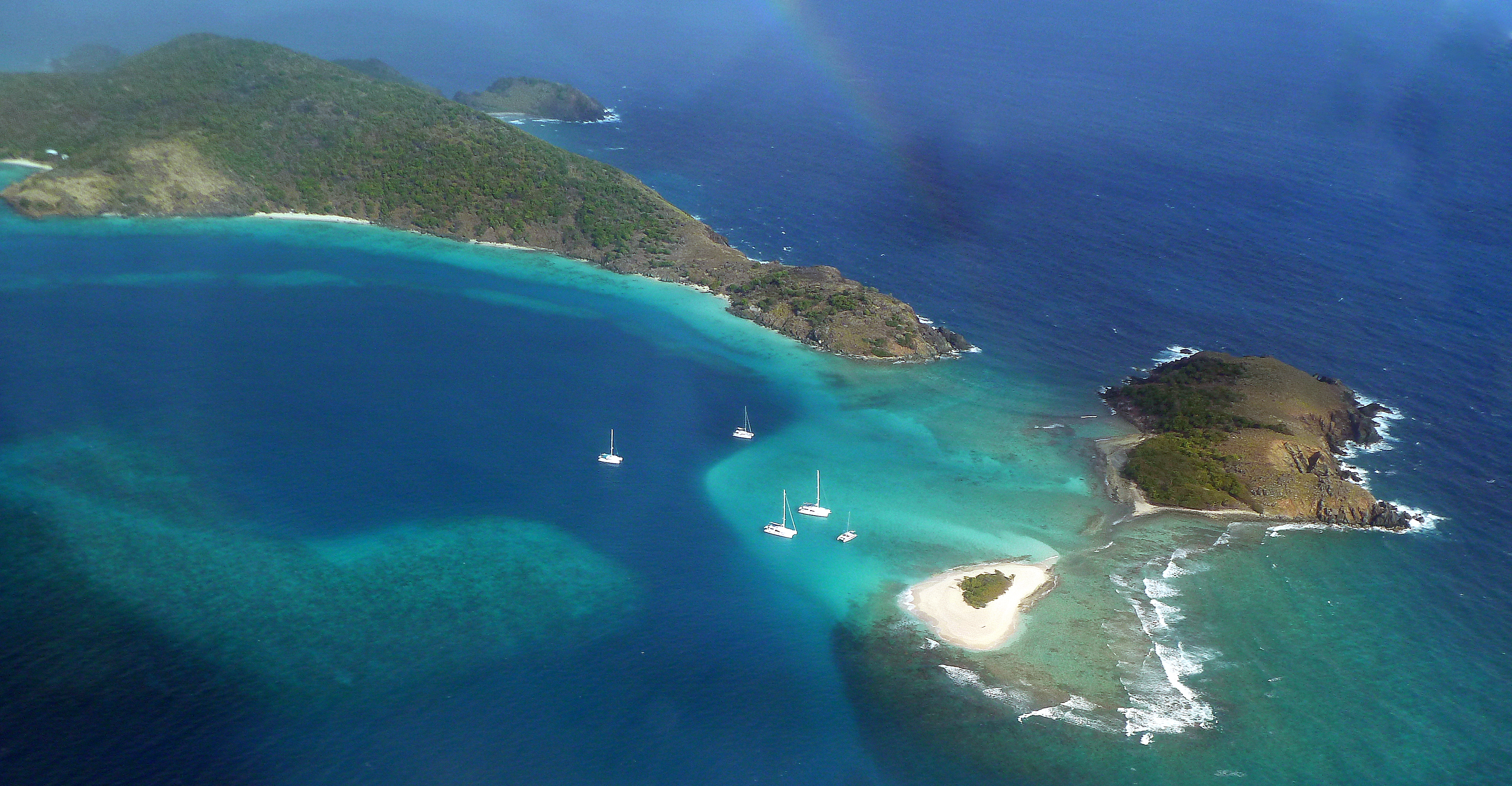
- Green Cay on the right

- The location of Green Cay within the British Virgin Islands

- Location within British Virgin Islands Location within the Caribbean

Geography
- Location: Caribbean Sea
- Coordinates: 18°27′13″N 64°42′31″W
- Archipelago: Virgin Islands

Administration
- United Kingdom
- British Overseas Territory: British Virgin Islands

Demographics
- Population: 0

Additional information
- Time zone: AST (UTC-4)
- ISO code: VG

Green Cay is an uninhabited island of the British Virgin Islands in the Caribbean. It sits between the eastern tip of Little Jost Van Dyke and Tortola. It is 14 acres (6 ha) in area.

== Environment ==
The island, with its surrounding waters, has been designated an Important Bird Area (IBA) by BirdLife International because it supports a large nesting colony of roseate terns. The island also provides habitat for the Puerto Rican racer (Borinkenophis portoricensis), the crested anole (Anolis cristatellus wileyae), and the big-scaled least gecko (Sphaerodactylus macrolepis macrolepis).
