= Cape Anderson =

Cape in the South Orkney Islands

Cape Anderson (60°46′S 44°35′W) is a cape which marks the east side of the entrance to Mill Cove on the south coast of Laurie Island, in the South Orkney Islands. Charted in 1903 by the Scottish National Antarctic Expedition under Bruce, who named it for his secretary, Nan Anderson.

== See also ==
- Florence Rock
