= Virgin Islands coquí =

Conservation status
- Endangered (IUCN 3.1)

Scientific classification
- Kingdom: Animalia
- Phylum: Chordata
- Class: Amphibia
- Order: Anura
- Family: Eleutherodactylidae
- Genus: Eleutherodactylus
- Species: E. schwartzi

Binomial name
- Eleutherodactylus schwartzi Thomas, 1966

Species of frog

The Virgin Islands coquí (Eleutherodactylus schwartzi) is a species of frog in the family Eleutherodactylidae. The species is endemic to the Virgin Islands.

== Taxonomy ==
The first description of Eleutherodactylus schwartzi was published by Richard Thomas in 1966. (Note: Published in the December 1965 issue of the Quarterly Journal of the Florida Academy of the Sciences, which, contrary to the name, was published 22 February 1966.) The specific name, schwartzi, is derived from the name of the American herpetologist Albert Schwartz, and was chosen "in honor of his work on West Indian Eleutherodactylus." The holotype, a female, had been collected by Schwartz and Gerald D. Gagnon in August 1964, with the type locality being Ross Lodge, Tortola, at an elevation of 750 m (2,460 ft). According to Thomas, the Eleutherodactylus portoricensis that Chapman Grant had in the 1930s reported finding on Saint John and Tortola had actually been Eleutherodactylus schwartzi.

== Description and behaviour ==
E.schwartzi is somewhat smaller than the sympatric and closely related Eleutherodactylus coqui. Richard Thomas examined a total of 13 males and 3 females (Note: Including the holotype.) and recorded male snout–vent lengths between 16.1–23.1 mm (0.63–0.91 in) and female ones between 30.5–33.7 mm (1.20–1.33 in). The is yellowish tan in colour, with faint black stippling and, apart from a hazy stripe, no visible pattern on its back.

Male coquí produce a two-note advertisement call to attract females for courtship. Once the male begins to be approached by a female it begins to use its soft multi-note courtship call, which is barely audible even at distances of under a meter (3 ft 3 in), interspersed with similarly quiet advertisement calls.

== Distribution and habitat ==
E.schwartzi is, as of 2026, endemic to the British Virgin Islands, being extant on the islands of Tortola Guana, Virgin Gorda and Great Dog, Beef, Frenchmans Cay, Jost Van Dyke and Little Thatch, the last of which it was introduced to as part of conservation efforts. The coquí is found in dry scrub forests, and almost always in bromeliads, which is also where it lays its eggs.

E.schwartzi has been extirpated from the only US Virgin Island in its range, Saint John, and on the other islands it still inhabits it is threatened by habitat loss. Its habitat is highly fragmented, consisting of small isolated areas that the coquí generally do not move between. There is also a concern that if introduced to the islands Eleutherodactylus coqui may outcompete E.schwartzi. The 2020 IUCN assessment of E. schwartzi listed the species as endangered.
