= Cockroach Island =

Island in the Caribbean

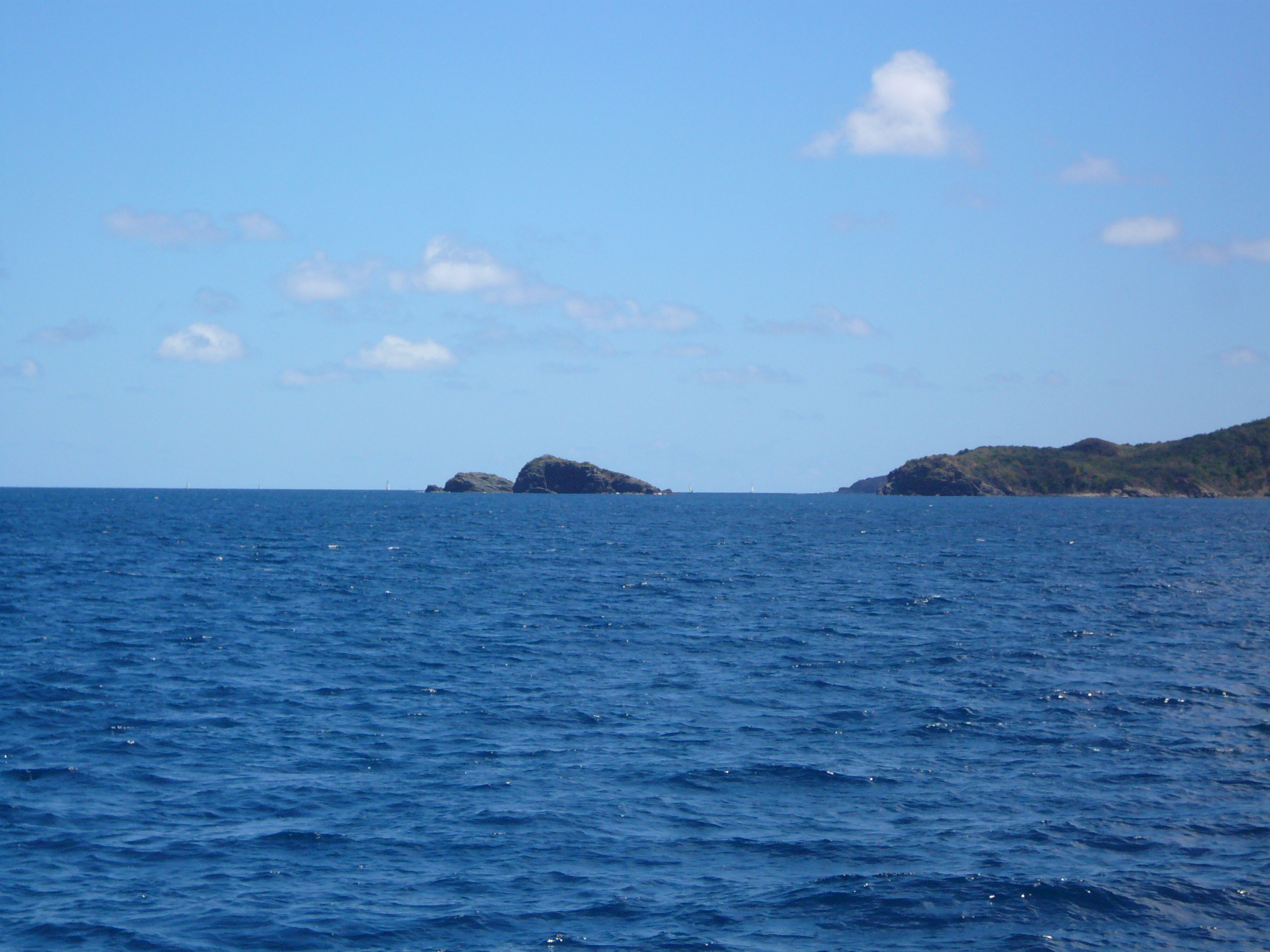
- Cockroach Island (the small rocks on the left)

- The location of Cockroach Island within the British Virgin Islands

- Location within British Virgin Islands Location within the Caribbean

Geography
- Location: Atlantic Ocean
- Coordinates: 18.4947°N 64.4636°W
- Archipelago: Virgin Islands

Administration
- United Kingdom; British Virgin Islands
- British Overseas Territory: British Virgin Islands

Demographics
- Population: 0

Additional information
- Time zone: AST (UTC-4)
- ISO code: VG

Cockroach Island is an uninhabited island of the British Virgin Islands in the Caribbean. It is located near North Sound, Virgin Gorda, amongst a collection of islands known as "The Dogs" or "The Dog Islands".

The roseate tern (Sterna dougallii) is found on the island. Reef flats north of the island provide habitat for Montastrea cavernosa and Gorgonia corals.
