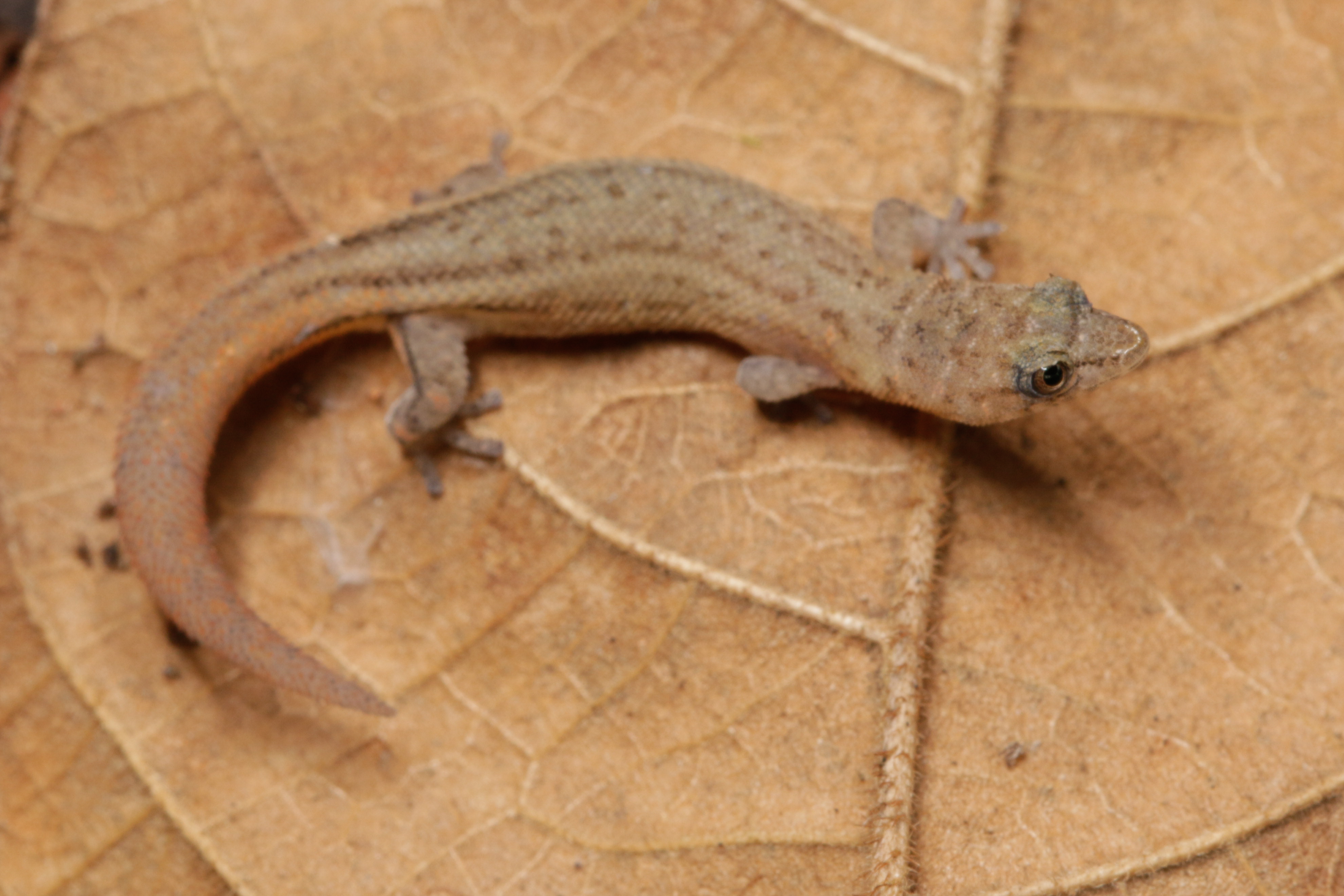

Conservation status
- Least Concern (IUCN 3.1)

Scientific classification
- Kingdom: Animalia
- Phylum: Chordata
- Class: Reptilia
- Order: Squamata
- Suborder: Gekkota
- Family: Sphaerodactylidae
- Genus: Sphaerodactylus
- Species: S. ariasae

Binomial name
- Sphaerodactylus ariasae Hedges & Thomas, 2001
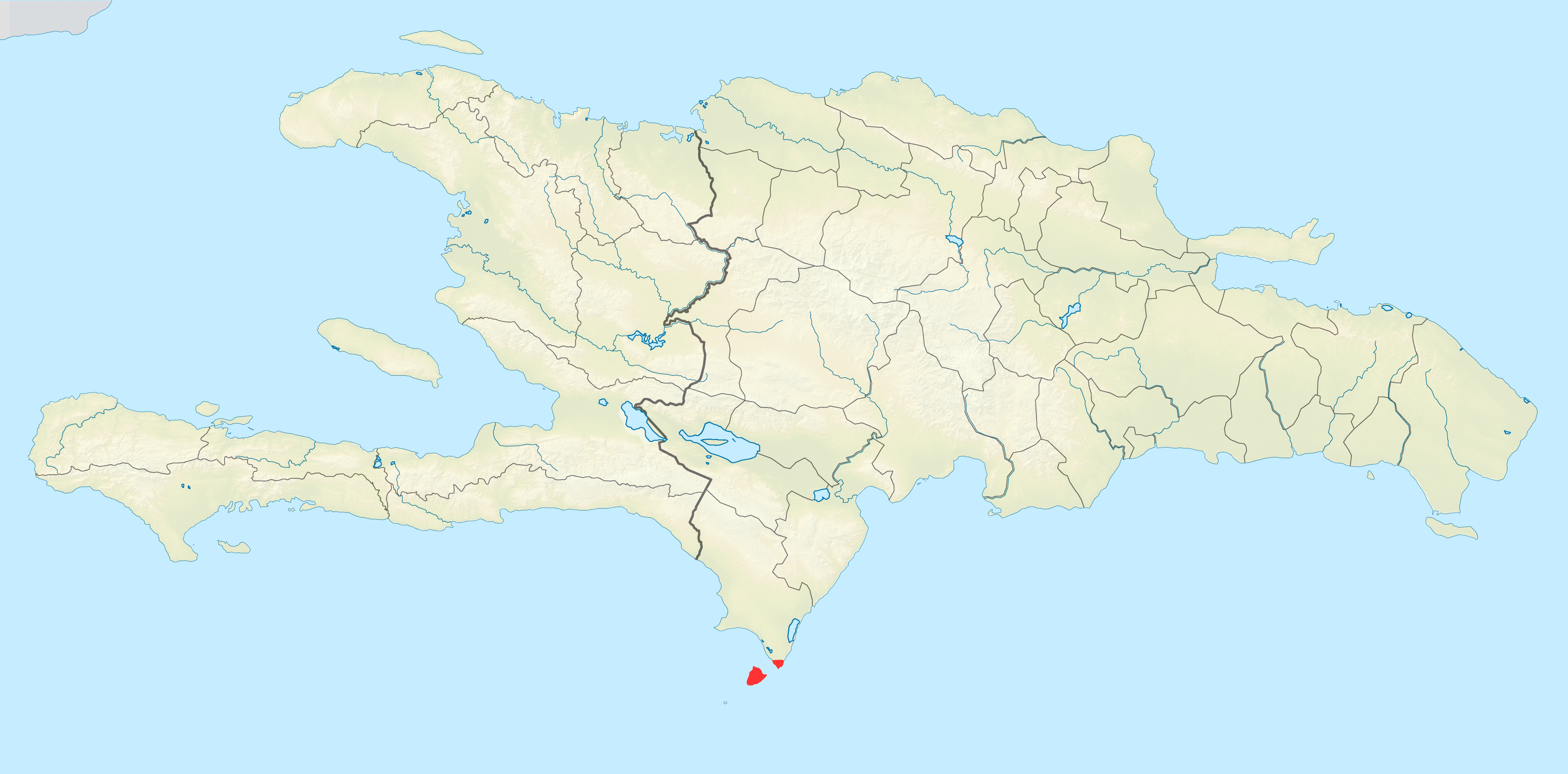
- Distribution of Sphaerodactylus ariasae. Inferred range in red.

= Sphaerodactylus ariasae =

Species of reptile

Sphaerodactylus ariasae, commonly called the Jaragua sphaero or the Jaragua dwarf gecko, is the smallest species of lizard in the family Sphaerodactylidae.

== Description ==
Sphaerodactylus ariasae is the world's smallest known reptile. The second-smallest is S. parthenopion, native to the British Virgin Islands. The Jaragua sphaero measures 14–18 mm (0.55–0.71 in) from the snout to the base of the tail and can fit on a US 25-cent coin. It has an average weight of 0.13 g (0.0045 oz).

== Geographic range ==
The geographic range of S. ariasae is believed to be limited to Jaragua National Park, in the southernmost tip of the Barahona Peninsula, in the extreme southwest of the Dominican Republic and nearby forested Beata Island on Hispaniola.

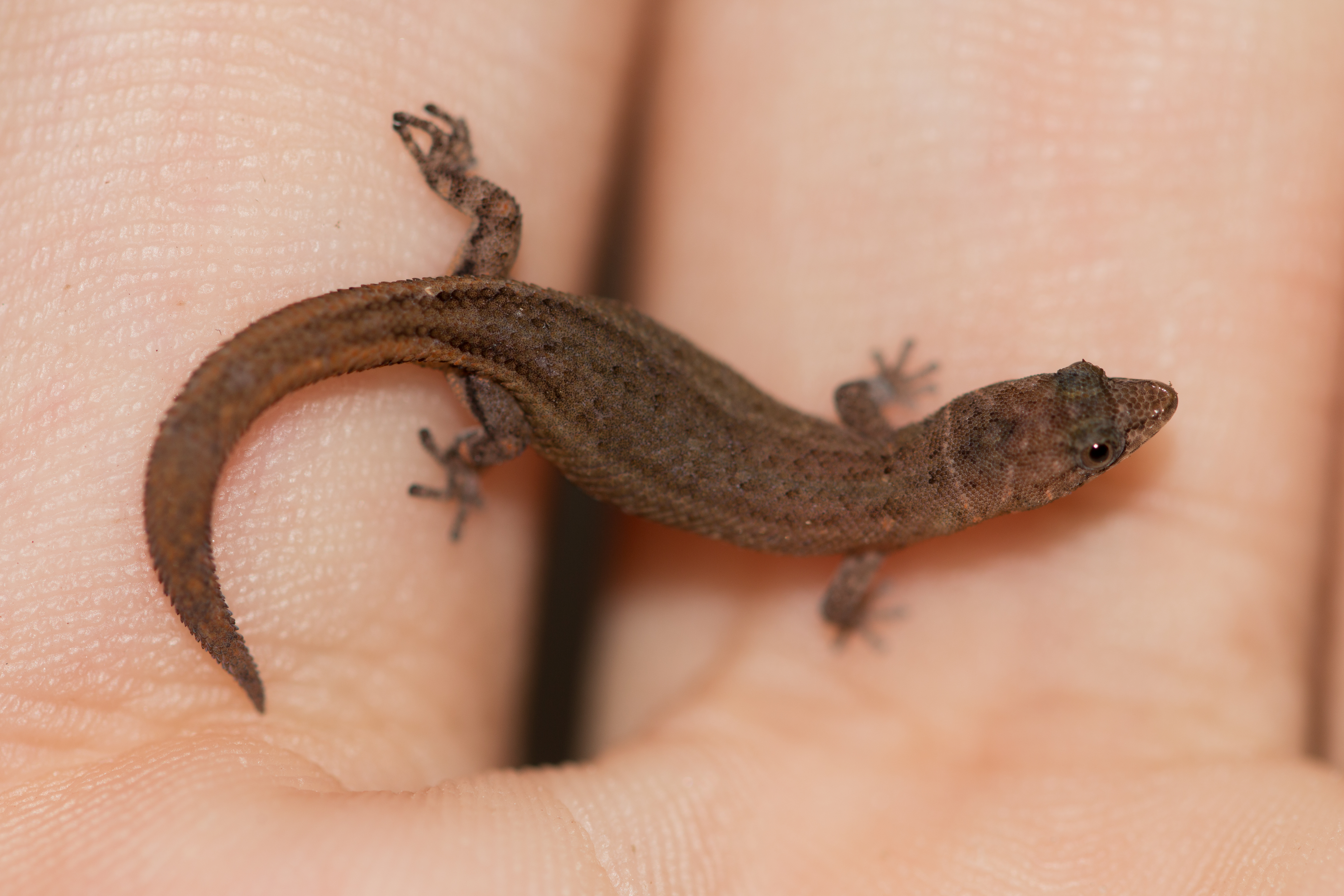
Gravid female

== Habitat ==
The preferred natural habitat of S. ariasae is the leaf litter of the forest floor of dry forests with limestone substratum.

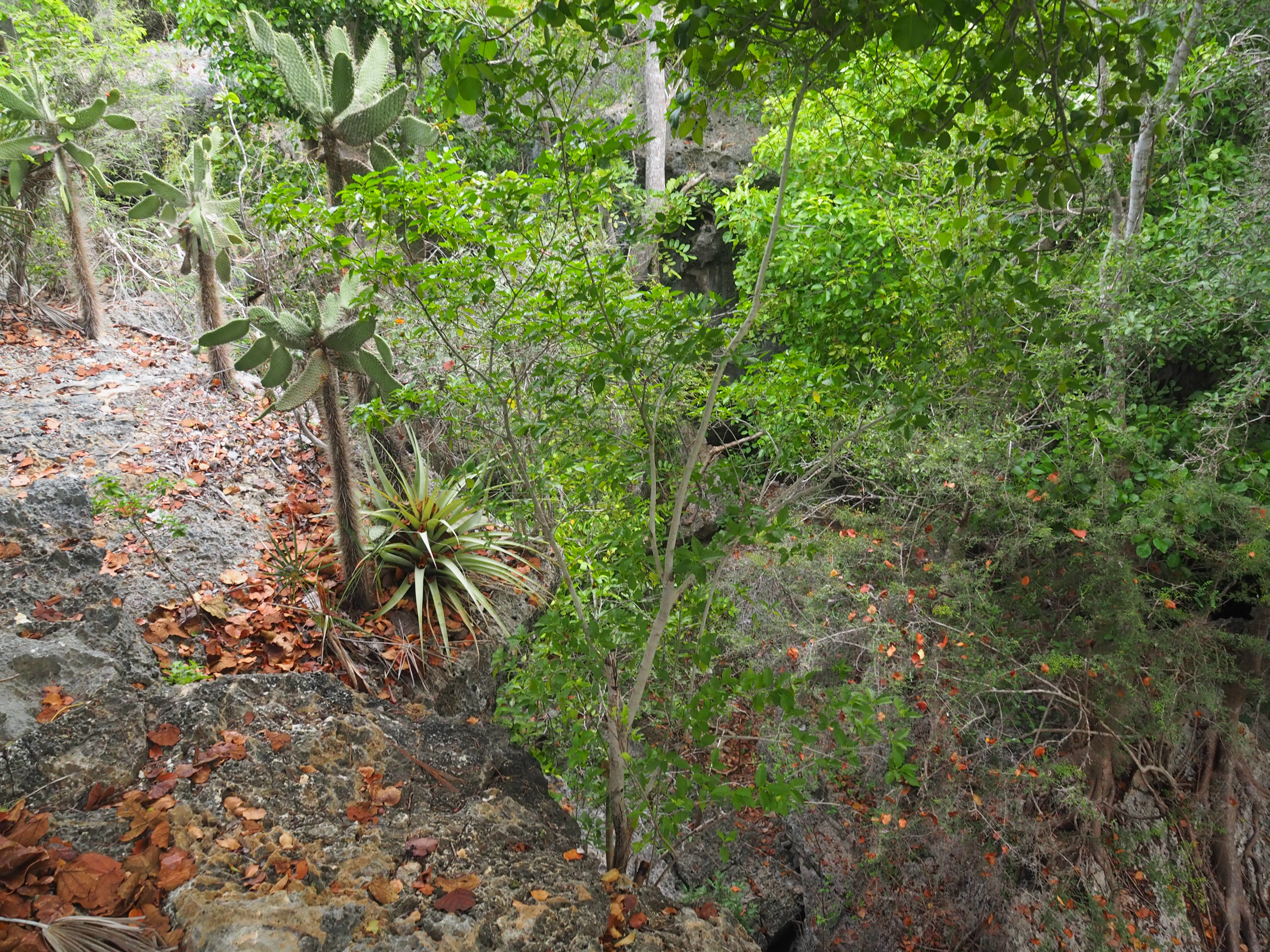
Habitat of S. ariasae in Beata island. Large trees grow on certain parts of the island, including sinkholes, which are surrounded by xeric scrub.

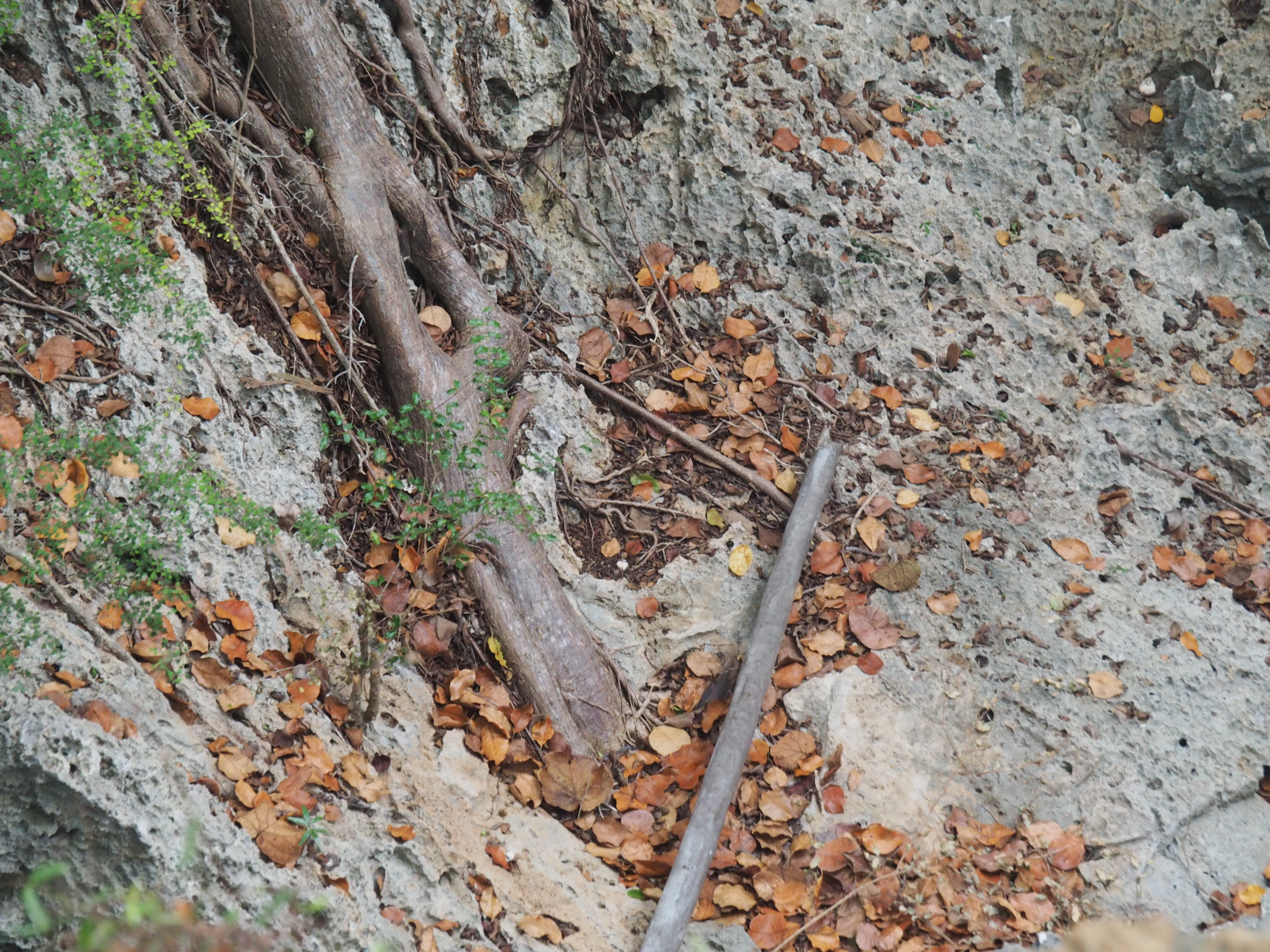
Microhabitat of S. ariasae in Beata island, consisting of patches of leaf litter deposited over karstified limestone.

== Reproduction ==
S. ariasae is oviparous.

== Taxonomy ==
S. ariasae was first described by Blair Hedges, a Pennsylvania State University evolutionary biologist, and Richard Thomas, a University of Puerto Rico biologist, in the December 2001 issue of the Caribbean Journal of Science.

== Etymology ==
The Jaragua sphaero's binomial name was chosen in honor of herpetologist Yvonne Arias, the leader of the Dominican conservation organization Grupo Jaragua, which was instrumental in securing the environmental protection of Jaragua National Park.

== See also ==
- Smallest organisms
