= Mill Cove, Antarctica =

Cove in the South Orkney Islands off Antarctica

Mill Cove (60°46′S 44°35′W) is a cove entered between Cape Anderson and Valette Island on the south coast of Laurie Island, in the South Orkney Islands off Antarctica. It was charted in 1903 by the Scottish National Antarctic Expedition under William Speirs Bruce, who named it for Hugh Robert Mill, a British geographer and polar historian.
