= Isle of Dogs (disambiguation) =

The Isle of Dogs is a large peninsula in east London, caused by a meander of the River Thames.

Isle of Dogs can also refer to:

- The Isle of Dogs (play), a 16th-century play by Thomas Nashe and Ben Jonson
- Isle of Dogs, a 2001 novel by Patricia Cornwell
- Isle of Dogs (film), a 2018 animated film by Wes Anderson

== See also ==
- Dog Island (disambiguation), for other places with a similar name
