= Sandy Cay (British Virgin Islands) =

Island in the British Virgin Islands

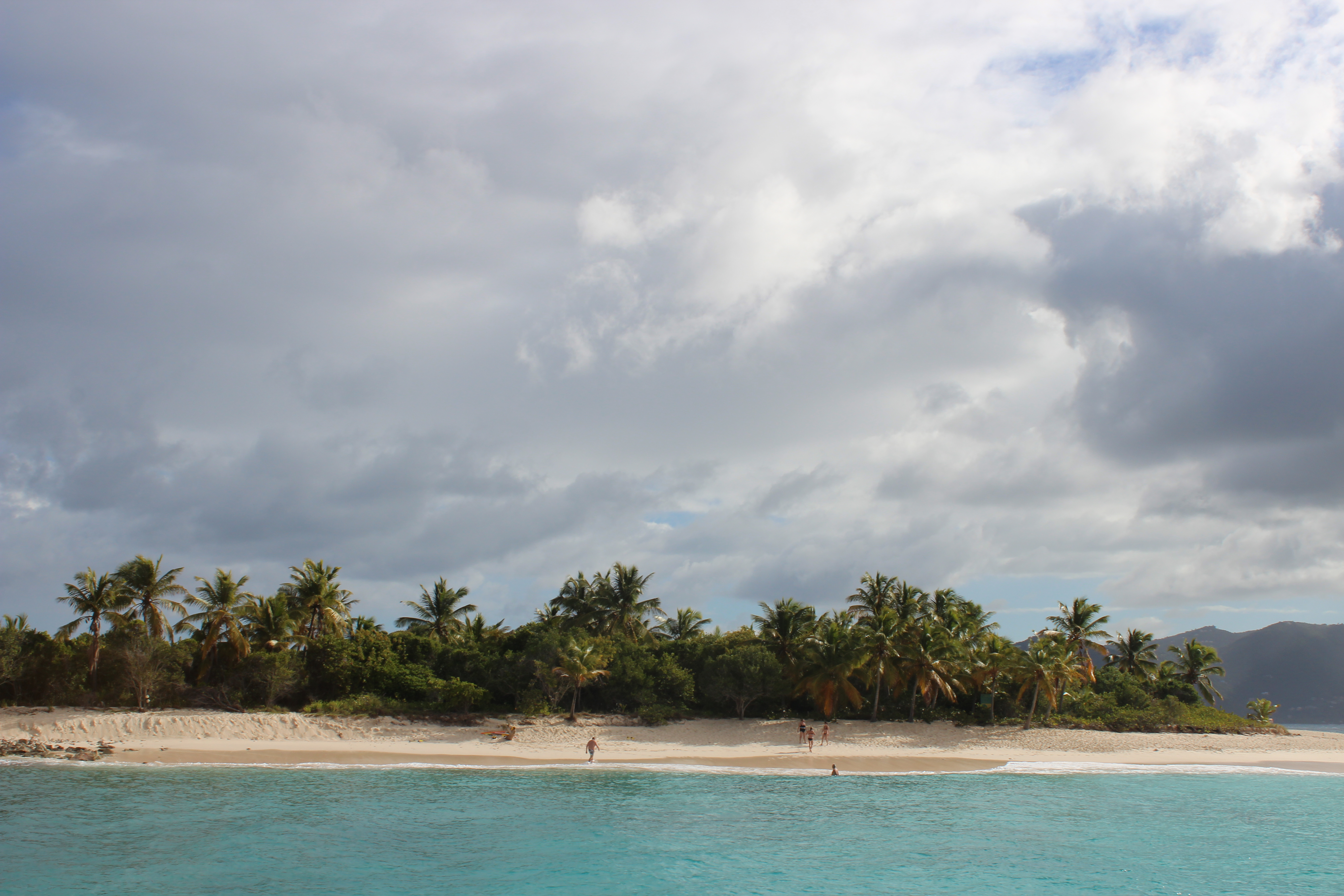

- The location of Sandy Cay within the British Virgin Islands

- Location within British Virgin Islands Location within the Caribbean

Geography
- Location: Caribbean Sea
- Coordinates: 18°26′10″N 64°42′35″W
- Archipelago: Virgin Islands

Administration
- United Kingdom
- British Overseas Territory: British Virgin Islands

Additional information
- Time zone: AST (UTC-4)
- ISO code: VG

Sandy Cay is an uninhabited island of the British Virgin Islands in the Caribbean. It is located between Tortola and Jost Van Dyke. The island was owned by the Laurance Rockefeller Estate. On 1 May 2008, ownership of the island was transferred to the National Parks Trust of the Virgin Islands. In 2002, International NGO, Island Resources Foundation led a project to eradicate invasive black rats from the island.

The island comprises 13.57 acres (5.49 ha). It is a "managed habitat" area. The island has a short hiking trail, maintained with the help of the Jost Van Dykes BVI Preservation Society (JVDPS), a local non-governmental organization (NGO). The National Parks Trust subcontracts caretaking responsibilities to the Jost Van Dyke Preservation Society (JVDPS), which sponsors regular visits from Little Harbour on Jost Van Dyke to maintain the trail, do frequent bird counts and remove trash.

The rocks on the island have a greenish colour from copper ore deposits. The island also contains a small salt pond in its centre.

The island's wildlife includes many hermit crabs, which flourished after the eradication of invasive black rats in 2003.

The name Sandy Cay is also shared by several small islands in the Bahamas as well as an island in Honduras.

There is no beach bar or anything similar on the island, though it is a very popular stopping point for holidaymakers cruising on boats in the area. There is a small daytime mooring field on the leeward (southwest) side of the island.

The island provides habitat for the crested anole (Anolis cristatellus wileyae), and the big-scaled least gecko (Sphaerodactylus macrolepis macrolepis).
