= Stanlow Island =

Island in England

Coordinates: 53°17′23″N 2°51′40″W

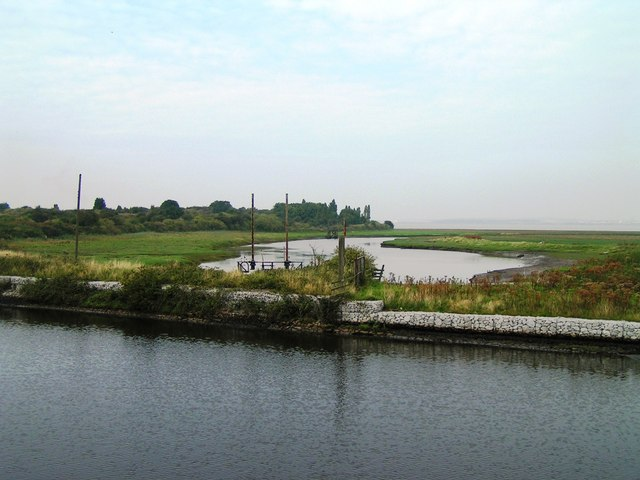
Stanlow Island from the Manchester Ship Canal

Stanlow Island is a small island found on the Manchester Ship Canal outside the Stanlow Oil Refinery. The island was occupied until the 1990s when the locals left due to isolation and the hazards of living nearby the refinery. Notable structures are the remains of Stanlow Abbey founded in 1178 that still remain at Stanlow Point. Access to the island is by a 24-hour request ferry that links the Essar refinery to Stanlow Island, requiring special permission.

== See also ==
- List of islands of England
- List of islands of the United Kingdom
- List of lost settlements in the United Kingdom
- Artificial island
- Land reclamation
- Land recycling
- Polder
