= The Indians =

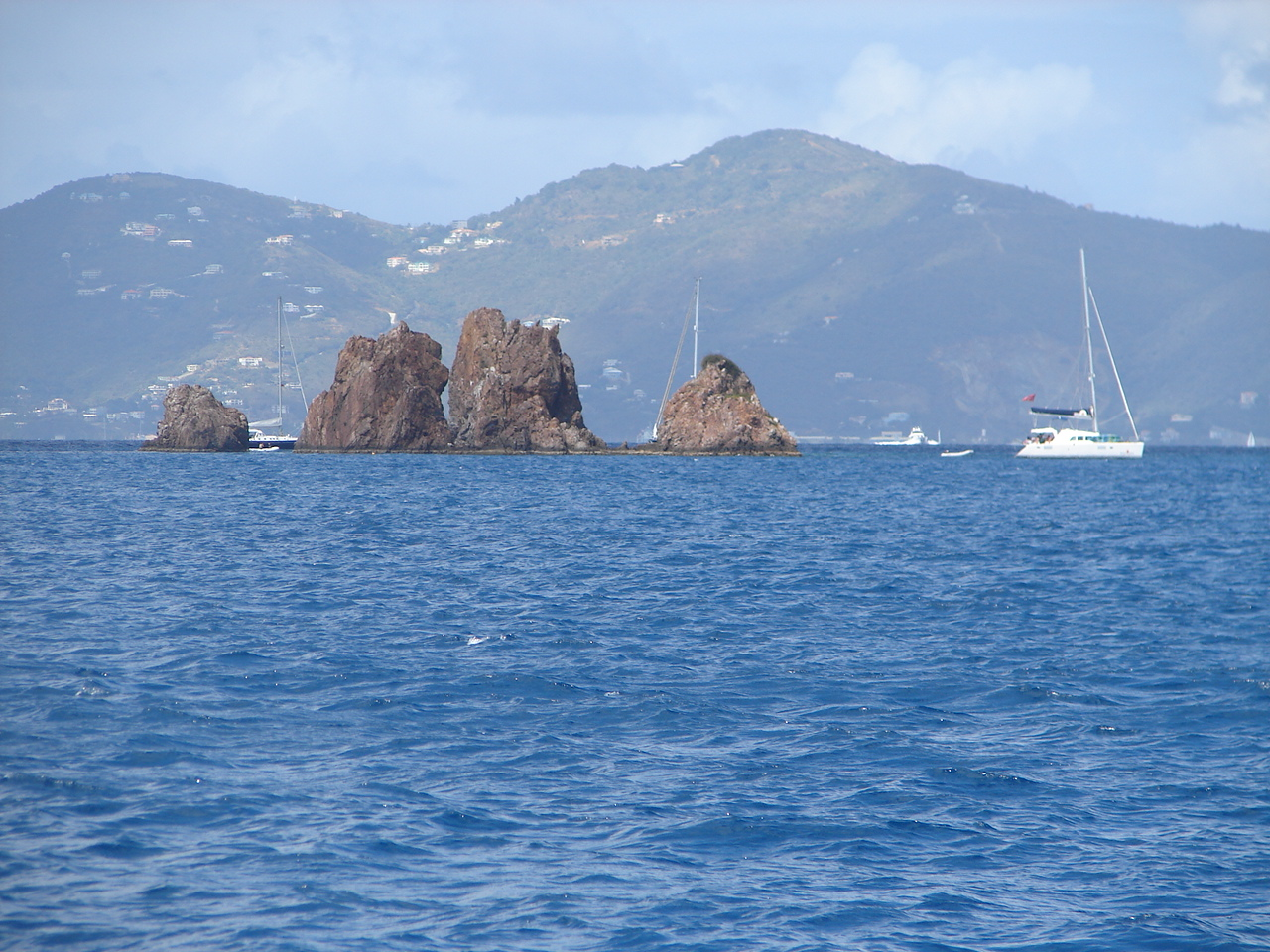
- The Indians, with Tortola in the background

- Location within British Virgin Islands Location within the Caribbean

Geography
- Location: Caribbean Sea
- Coordinates: 18.3318°N 64.6288°W
- Archipelago: Virgin Islands

Administration
- United Kingdom
- British Overseas Territory: British Virgin Islands

Additional information
- Time zone: AST (UTC-4)
- ISO code: VG

The Indians are an uninhabited small archipelago of islets in the British Virgin Islands in the Caribbean. They are west of the small British Pelican Island and east of the small U.S. Flanagan Island.

They are located south of larger British Tortola Island and east of the large US Saint John Island.

They were so named because from a distance they were thought to resemble a Native American's head dress.

The waters around the Indians contain much marine life, and are also the second most popular dive site in the British Virgin Islands after the wreck of the RMS Rhone. The shallower areas of the Indians are also a popular snorkelling site and the area has several mooring balls for day use.
