= Dog Islands =

Group of islets in the Caribbean

Location of the Dog Islands

Dog Islands are a small group of islets among the British Virgin Islands in the Caribbean.

The islands originally received their names from sailors who heard barking when they moored there, and assumed that they must be dogs. However, the barking noises were made by Caribbean monk seals. The sailors also regarded the Caribbean monk seal as a good source of fresh seal meat, and as a result, they are now extinct.

== Geography ==
The Dog Islands are situated about 6 miles (10 km) north east off the main island of Tortola and about 2.5 mi (4.0 km) off the north west of Virgin Gorda in the strait Sir Francis Drake Channel. The coordinates of the main islet are 18°28′96″N and 64°27′70″W.

The uninhabited islets are of volcanic origin and have a total area of about 173 acres (70 ha)

The group consist of 5 islets:

- Great Dog Island, main islet, about 98 acres (40 ha)
- George Dog Island, about 15 acres (6 ha)
- West Dog Island, about 27 acres (11 ha)

and the subgroup Seal Dogs about 1.8 mi (2.9 km) north east off Great Dog Island with

- East Seal Dog Island, about 2.2 acres (1 ha) and
- Little Seal Dog Island (mostly called West Seal Dog), about 5.7 acres (2.3 ha)

Situated west off George Dog and within the same sub-group lies the small islet Cockroach Island.

== History ==
The first European sighting of the Virgin Islands was by Christopher Columbus in 1493 on his second voyage to the New World. Columbus gave the area the fanciful name Santa Ursula y Las Islas Once Mil Vírgenes (Saint Ursula and her 11,000 Virgins), shortened to Las Vírgenes (The Virgins), after the legend of Saint Ursula.

Today the waters around the islets are a popular site for scuba diving (3).

West Seal Dog nowadays is a BVI National Park.

== See also ==
- Dog Island and Isle of Dogs, for similarly-named places
