= Dog Island, U.S. Virgin Islands =

Island in the United States Virgin Islands

Dog Island
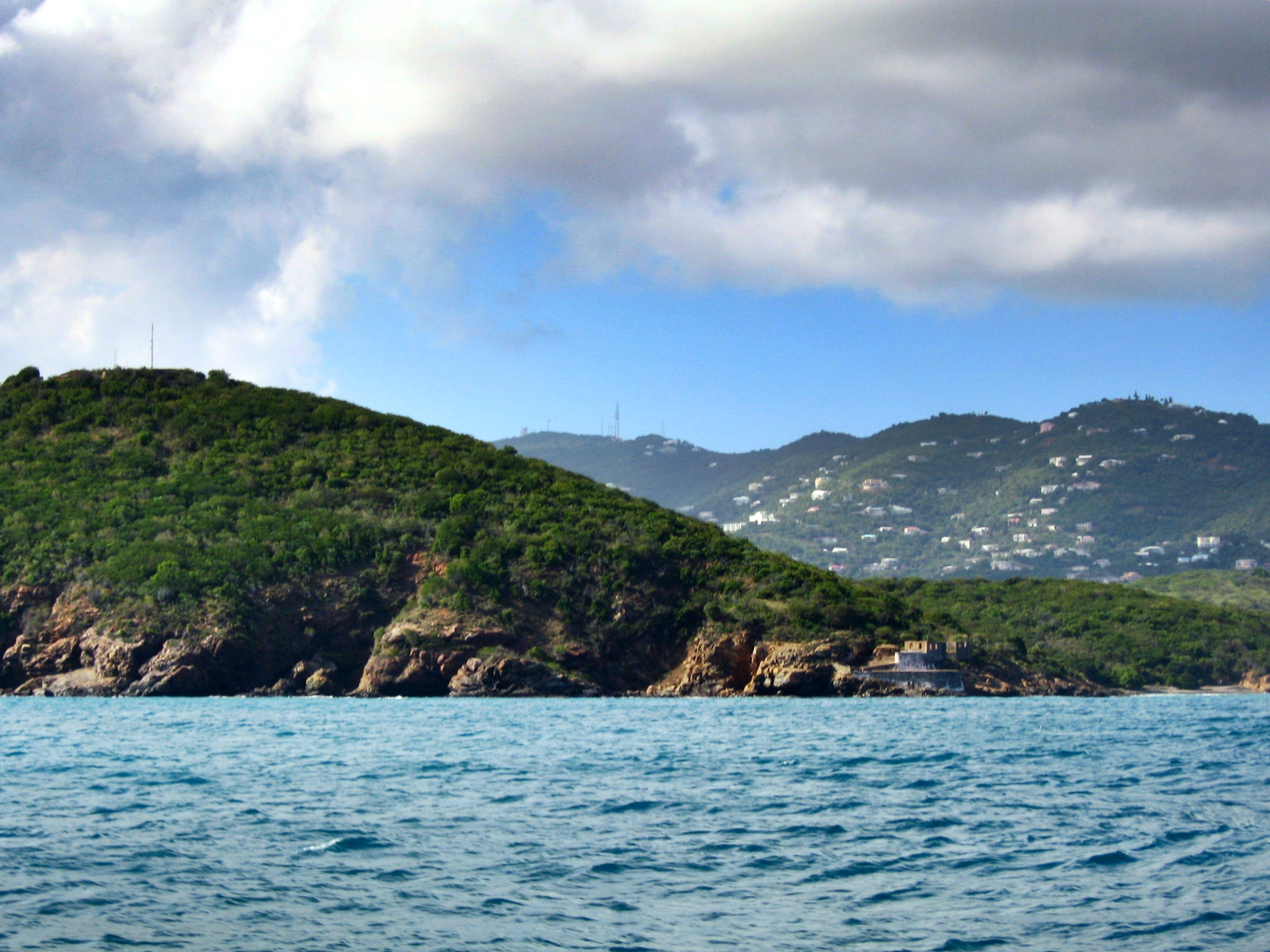

- Location in the Caribbean Dog Island, U.S. Virgin Islands (the Caribbean)

Geography
- Location: Caribbean Sea
- Coordinates: 18.2958°N 64.8158°W

Dog Island is a small, uninhabited island located east-southeast of Little Saint James island in the U.S. Virgin Islands. Dog Island is separated from Little Saint James by the Dog Island Cut. Off its eastern point lie the Dog Rocks. Unlike the privately owned Little Saint James, Dog Island is owned by the U.S. Virgin Islands government.
