= Valette Island =

Island in the South Orkney Islands

- Interactive map of Valette Island

Geography
- Location: South Orkney Islands, Southern Ocean
- Length: 0.2 mi (0.3 km)

Valette Island (60°46′S 44°36′W) is an island, 0.2 nautical miles (0.4 km) long, lying in the west side of the entrance to Mill Cove on the south side of Laurie Island, in the South Orkney Islands. Charted by the Scottish National Antarctic Expedition, 1902–1904, under Bruce, who named it for L.H. Valette, Argentine meteorologist at the Laurie Island station during 1904.

== See also ==
- List of antarctic and sub-antarctic islands
