= Little Anegada =

Island in British Virgin Islands

Coordinates: 18°43′N 64°18′W

Little Anegada is an island of the British Virgin Islands in the Caribbean.
