= East Seal Dog Island =

Islet in the Caribbean

- Location within British Virgin Islands Location within the Caribbean

Geography
- Location: Caribbean Sea
- Coordinates: 18.5067°N 64.4323°W
- Archipelago: Virgin Islands

Administration
- United Kingdom
- British Overseas Territory: British Virgin Islands

Demographics
- Population: 0

Additional information
- Time zone: AST (UTC-4)
- ISO code: VG

East Seal Dog is an uninhabited islet of the British Virgin Islands in the Caribbean. It is located in a smaller sub-group of islands referred to as the Dog Islands, or more commonly, "The Dogs". Other islets in The Dogs include Little Seal Dog Island, West Dog Island and George Dog Island, all of which are to the northwest of Virgin Gorda.

The island provides habitat for the crested anole (Anolis cristatellus wileyae). In 1985, white band disease was noted on elkhorn coral (A. palmata) in the water to the north of the island.
