= Mosquito Island =

Island of the British Virgin Islands

Moskito Island
- Interactive map of Moskito Island
- Other names: Mosquito Island

Geography
- Coordinates: 18°30′38″N 64°23′38″W
- Archipelago: Virgin Islands
- Area: 125 acres (51 ha)

Administration
- United Kingdom
- British Overseas Territory: British Virgin Islands

Additional information
- Time zone: AST (UTC-4)
- ISO code: VG

Moskito Island (sometimes spelled Mosquito Island) is an island off the coast of Virgin Gorda and has long been a favourite for scuba divers and sailors. For many years the island was the location of a sail-in dive resort named Drake's Anchorage. Sir Richard Branson purchased the island in 2007 for £10 million.

Branson announced in 2011 that he planned to relocate ring-tailed lemurs from some zoos in Canada, Sweden, and South Africa to the island. Later relocations of red ruffed lemurs and possibly sifakas might follow. The announced plans were met with some criticism.

The island is located on the west side of Gorda Sound adjacent to Virgin Gorda and near Necker Island, which is also owned by Branson.

Barack Obama visited the island in February 2017, and learned how to kiteboard there, shortly after his retirement as President of the United States.

== History ==
The Virgin Islands were an early haunt of buccaneers and pirates and have a long history of trade. Much of the known history of Moskito Island comes from the European occupation, which began when Columbus first visited the Virgin Islands on his second voyage to the Americas in November 1493. At some point between 1716 and 1739 the island's name was changed, as confirmed by a later map which named the island Musketa – possibly an Anglicised version of the word 'musket'. Later maps refer to the island as Moskito, which it is known as today.

The group of people who lived on Moskito Island originally are classified culturally as Taino. Their culture evolved in Puerto Rico and the Virgin Islands over a thousand-year period. The Taino people were eliminated from the Virgin Islands in 1514 when a Spanish attack on their settlement exterminated the remaining families. By the late 1800s, Moskito Island was abandoned and used only to graze livestock until Drake's Anchorage resort was built by Mr. Bert Kilbride in the 1960s, which ultimately closed in 2001.

== Name ==
On old nautical charts of the British Virgin Islands, the island's name is often spelled "Moskito" (possibly as an older spelling of "mosquito", as older versions of the English language did make greater use of etymological spelling).

Bert Kilbride, owner of Moskito Island from 1960 to 1970 and the original builder/operator of Drakes Anchorage, always said it was spelled MOSKITO after the Miskito Indians that traveled through the Caribbean Islands from South or Central America, although their name is spelled Miskito.
