= Little Seal Dog Island =

Islet in the Caribbean

- Location within British Virgin Islands Location within the Caribbean

Geography
- Location: Caribbean Sea
- Coordinates: 18.5068°N 64.4346°W
- Archipelago: Virgin Islands

Administration
- United Kingdom
- British Overseas Territory: British Virgin Islands

Demographics
- Population: 0

Additional information
- Time zone: AST (UTC-4)
- ISO code: VG

Little Seal Dog Island (also known as West Seal Dog Island) is an uninhabited islet of the British Virgin Islands in the Caribbean. It is located in a smaller sub-group of islands referred to as the Dog Islands, or more commonly, "The Dogs". Other islets in The Dogs include Great Dog, East Seal Dog and George Dog, all of which are to the northwest of Virgin Gorda. The island is roughly 5.7 acres. At one time the island was home to many species of seals and terns.
