= George Dog Island =

Island in the Caribbean

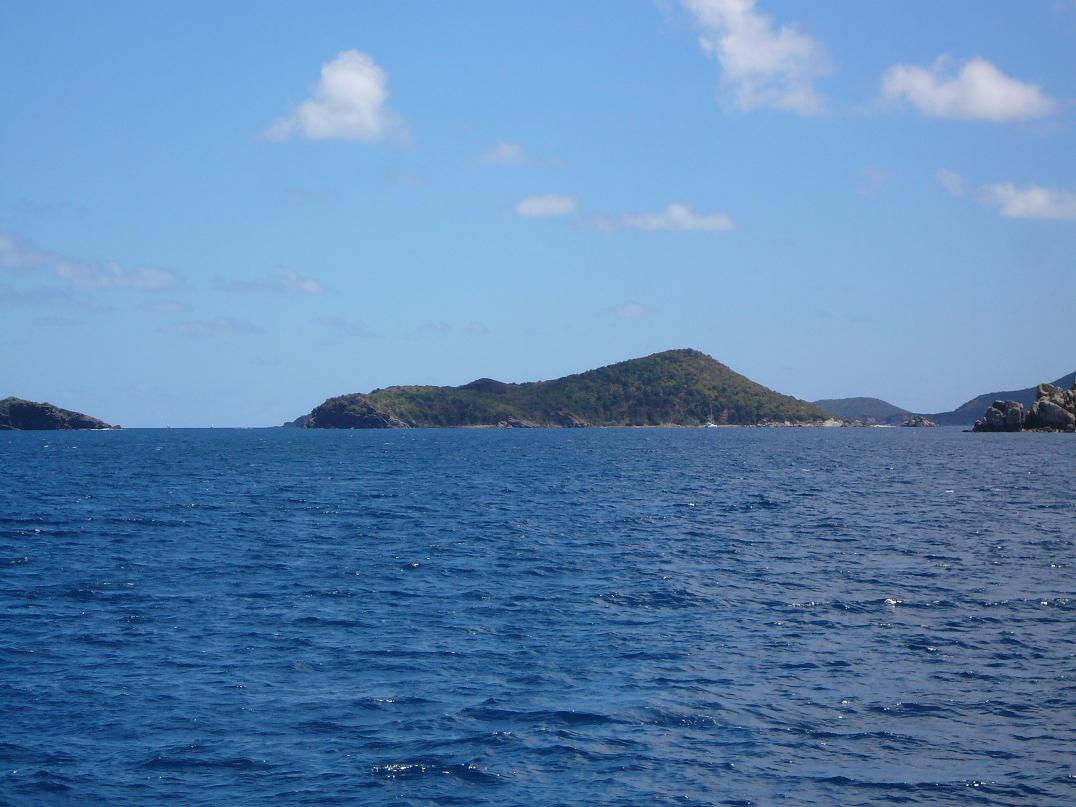
- George Dog Island. Virgin Gorda is visible in the background, and West Dog (on the right) and Great Dog (on the left) can also be seen.

- The location of George Dog Island within the British Virgin Islands

- Location within British Virgin Islands Location within the Caribbean

Geography
- Location: Caribbean Sea
- Coordinates: 18.4928°N 64.4571°W
- Archipelago: Virgin Islands

Administration
- United Kingdom
- British Overseas Territory: British Virgin Islands

Demographics
- Population: 0

Additional information
- Time zone: AST (UTC-4)
- ISO code: VG

George Dog is an uninhabited island of the British Virgin Islands in the Caribbean. It is located in a smaller sub-group of islands referred to as "The Dogs" (which include Little Seal Dog Island and West Dog Island) to the northwest of Virgin Gorda.

On the northwest side of the island is a popular diving site is known as "Bronco Billy", so named because of the surge which carries divers through a box canyon is thought to be similar to riding a bucking Bronco (it is believed that the name pre-dated the 1980 film of the same name). The site achieved a degree of fame when Jacques Cousteau declared it to be his favourite site in the Territory, ahead of more famous dive sites like the Wreck of the Rhone and The Indians.

The island provides habitat for the crested anole (Anolis cristatellus wileyae), Puerto Rican ground lizard (Ameiva exsul) and the big-scaled least gecko (Sphaerodactylus macrolepis macrolepis). The island's flora includes copperwood (Bursera simarouba) and seagrape (Coccoloba uvifera).

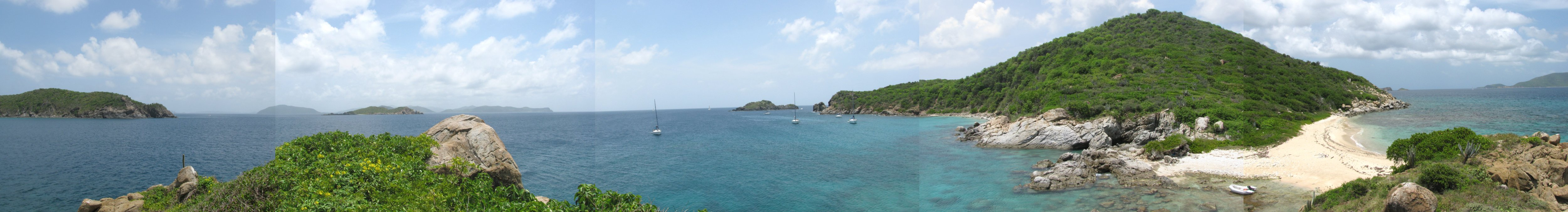
Panorama from the South end of George Dog Island
