= Big-scaled least gecko =

There are two species of gecko named big-scaled least gecko:

- Sphaerodactylus macrolepis, distributed in Puerto Rico, the United States Virgin Islands, and the British Virgin Islands in the Caribbean
- Sphaerodactylus grandisquamis, endemic to Puerto Rico
