= List of minor islands of the United States Virgin Islands =

50 islands and cays other than the three main ones in the US Virgin Islands

The United States Virgin Islands is an unincorporated territory of the United States that comprises a group of islands in the Caribbean. In addition to the main residential islands of Saint Thomas, Saint Croix, Saint John, and Water Island, there are roughly 50 other islands and cays. These include:

== Saint Croix ==
- Buck Island (National Park)
- Green Cay National Wildlife Refuge
- Protestant Cay
- Ruth Island

== East End, Saint Thomas ==
- Cas Cay
- Dog Island
- Great Saint James
- Little Saint James
- Shark Island
- Thatch Cay

== West End, Saint Thomas ==
- Kalkun Cay
- Savana Island

== Northside, Saint Thomas ==
- Hans Lollik Islands
- Inner Brass
- Outer Brass

== Southside, Saint Thomas ==
- Buck Island
- Capella Island
- Hassel Island (National Park)
- Saba Island
- Turtledove Cay

== Central, Saint John ==
- Carvel Rock
- Congo Cay
- Grass Cay
- Lovango Cay
- Mingo Cay
- Steven Cay

== Northside, Saint John ==
- Cinnamon Cay
- Henley Cay
- Ramgoat Cay
- Trunk Cay
- Waterlemon Cay
- Whistling Cay

== East End, Saint John ==
- Flanagan Island
- Leduck Island

== See also ==
- Islands of the United States Virgin Islands
- Danish West Indies
- Danish colonization of the Americas
