= Leduck Island =

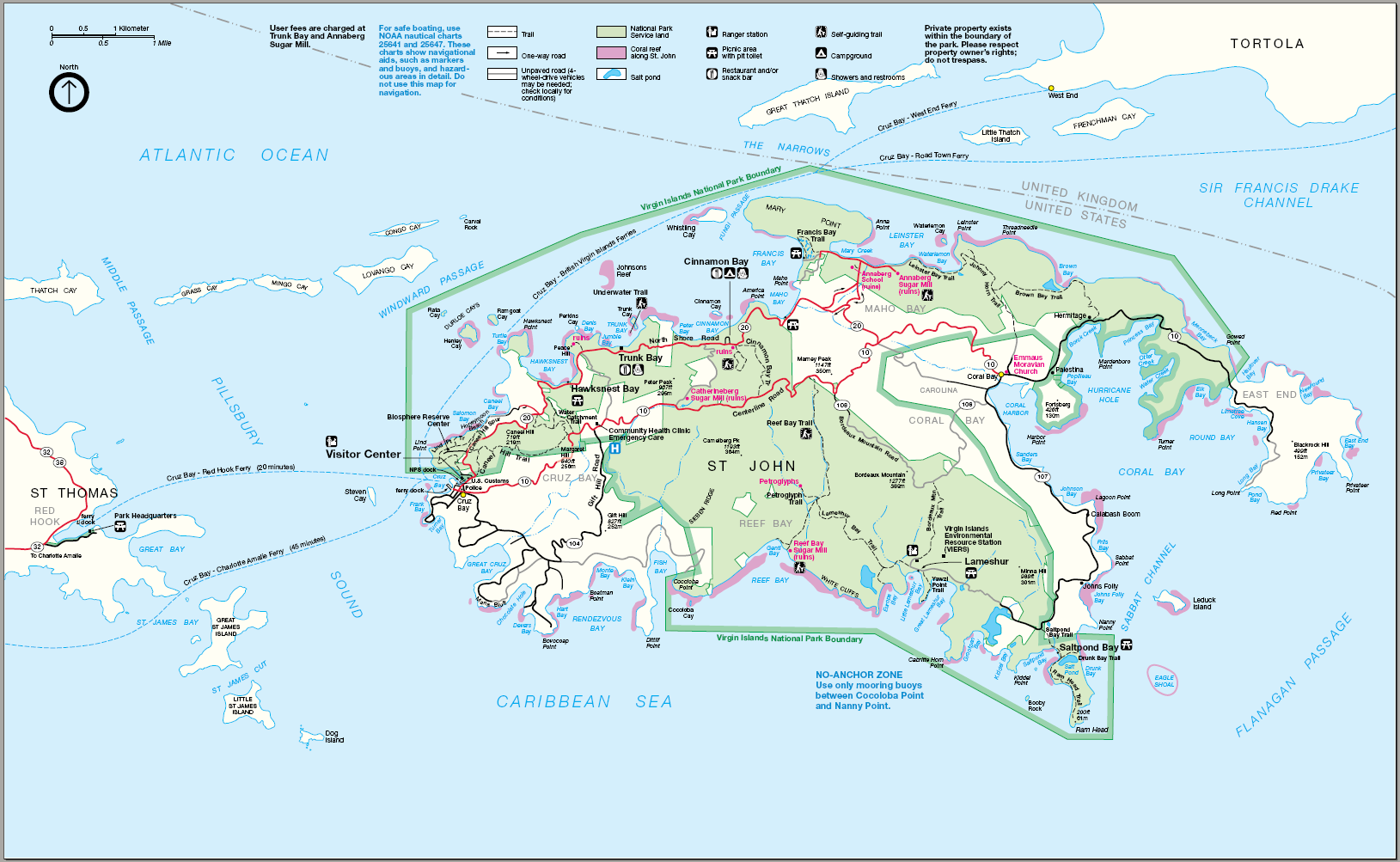
- Map of the Virgin Islands National Park with LeDuck Island in the east.

- Location in the Caribbean Leduck Island (the Caribbean)

Geography
- Location: Caribbean Sea
- Coordinates: 18°18′59″N 64°41′18″W

Administration
- United States; United States Virgin Islands
- Federal Department: U.S. Department of the Interior
- Federal Agency: U.S. Fish and Wildlife Service
- Capital city: Washington, D.C.
- Largest settlement: New York City
- President: Donald Trump

Leduck Island is an island in the United States Virgin Islands, also spelled LeDuck Island, which is located 0.5 miles east of Sabbat Point in Johns Folly, separated from Saint John by the Sabbat Channel. LeDuck Island lies by the entrance to Coral Bay and is 85 feet high. Leduck Island is located within the Virgin Islands National Park and is one of the largest offshore islands to Saint John, along with Grass Cay and Congo Cay.

== Flora and fauna ==
Being home to numerous spur and groove reefs, it is a popular scuba diving destination, and its reefs are habitat for an abundance for endemic tropical fish species. Some of the fish species found here include the Fairy basslet, Sergeant major, French angelfish, Gray angelfish, Queen triggerfish, Jackknife-fish, Blue chromis, Schoolmaster snapper, Mangrove snapper, Red hind, Blacktip shark, Hawksbill sea turtle, Glassy sweeper, Squirrelfish, and numerous species of damsels and jacks.

== See also ==
- Islands of the United States Virgin Islands
