= List of lighthouses in the United States territories =

The following is a list of lighthouses in four of the major territories of the United States. Most of the lights listed here have been modernized to be automated beacons on small steel towers or posts. There are just two known surviving lighthouses that held keepers, both of which are now inactive. Information for any given lighthouse may also be incomplete due to a lack of records and/or unreliable information.

- Note: Listed separate are lighthouses in Puerto Rico as more information is available about them.

== Lighthouses ==
Name	Image	Location	Coordinates	Year built	Year deactivated	Focal height	NGA number	Admiralty number
Apra Outer Harbor Range Front Light	N/A	Guam (Apra Harbor)	13°27′23.2″N 144°39′59.7″E	Unknown	Unknown	39 ft (12 m)	10983	M8386
Apra Outer Harbor Range Rear Light	N/A	Guam (Apra Harbor)	13°27′25.4″N 144°40′19.6″E	Unknown	Active	66 ft (20 m)	10983.1	M8386.1
Aunu'u Lightbeacon^{A}	N/A	American Samoa (Aunu'u)	14°16′50.2″S 170°32′52.4″W	Unknown	2014	25 ft (7.6 m)	3084	ex-K4588
Breakers Point Lightbeacon^{B}	N/A	American Samoa (Tutuila)	14°17′23.4″S 170°39′48.6″W	Unknown	Active	190 ft (58 m)	3088	K4576
Buck Island Light	N/A	Virgin Islands (Buck Island)	18°16′41.5″N 64°53′33.6″W	1913 (first); 1990s (current)	Active	139 ft (42 m)^{C}	14632	J5628
Fort Luise Augusta Light	N/A	Virgin Islands (Christiansted)	17°45′17.6″N 64°41′38.7″W	1857 (first); 1919 (current)	1931^{D}	45 ft (14 m)^{D}	14664	J5642
Glass Beakwater Light	N/A	Guam (Piti)	13°27′17.4″N 144°37′28.3″E	Unknown	Active	59 ft (18 m)	10984	M8386.2
Hams Bluff Light		Virgin Islands (Saint Croix)	17°46′07.5″N 64°52′18.7″W	1915 (first); 2010 (current)	Active	394 ft (120 m)^{C}	14656	J5640
Japanese Lighthouse (aka: Garapan Light)		Northern Mariana; Islands (Saipan)	15°12′42.3″N 145°43′53.9″E	1934	1944	Unknown	—	—
Orote Point Light	N/A	Guam (Point Udall)	13°26′45.0″N 144°37′10.3″E	1929 (first); N/A (current)	Active	226 ft (69 m)^{C}	10982	M8384
Pago Pago Range Front Lighthbeacon	N/A	American Samoa (Pago Pago)	14°16′08.2″S 170°40′27.2″W	1901 (first); N/A (current)	Active	37 ft (11 m)^{C}	3092	K4580
Pago Pago Range Rear Lighthbeacon	N/A	American Samoa (Pago Pago)	14°16′03.6″S 170°40′29.2″W	1901 (first); N/A (current)	Active	182 ft (55 m)^{C}	3096	K4580.1
Ritidian Point Light	N/A	Guam (Ritidian Point)	13°39′00.5″N 144°51′42.4″E	1932 (first); N/A (current)	Active	574 ft (175 m)^{C}	10981	M8382
Savana Island Light	N/A	Virgin Islands (Savana Island)	18°20′15.0″N 65°04′59.5″W	Unknown	Active	300 ft (91 m)	14604	J5610

== See also ==
- Lists of lighthouses
- Lists of lightvessels

== Notes ==
A. While the first build date is unknown, the light appeared on a 1922 list which describes it as a 13 ft (4.0 m) white square pyramidal tower.
B. While the first build date is unknown, the light appeared on a 1922 list which describes it as a 16 ft (4.9 m) white square pyramidal tower.
C. The focal height shown here is for the modern structure put into place (steel tower or post).
D. A modern light was mounted on a 17 ft (5.2 m) skeleton tower next to the house. The focal height of this tower is 45 ft (14 m).
