= The Buccaneer =

The Buccaneer can refer to:

Plays and film

- The Buccaneer (1925 play), an unsuccessful play by Maxwell Anderson about the famous pirate Henry Morgan
- The Buccaneer (1938 film), a Cecil B. DeMille film about another notorious pirate, Jean Lafitte, starring Fredric March
- The Buccaneer, an audio adaption on the 1938 film by Lux Radio Theatre starring Clark Gable.
- The Buccaneer (1958 film), a remake of the 1938 film, starring Yul Brynner

Places

- The Buccaneer (Christiansted, U.S. Virgin Islands), hotel on National Registry of the Historic Hotels of America

== See also ==
- The Buccaneers (film), a short silent comedy film directed by Robert F. McGowan.
