= Green Cay National Wildlife Refuge =

Island in the United States Virgin Islands

- IUCN category IV (habitat/species management area)
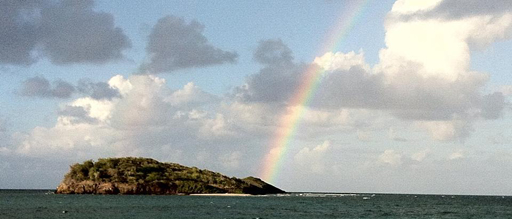

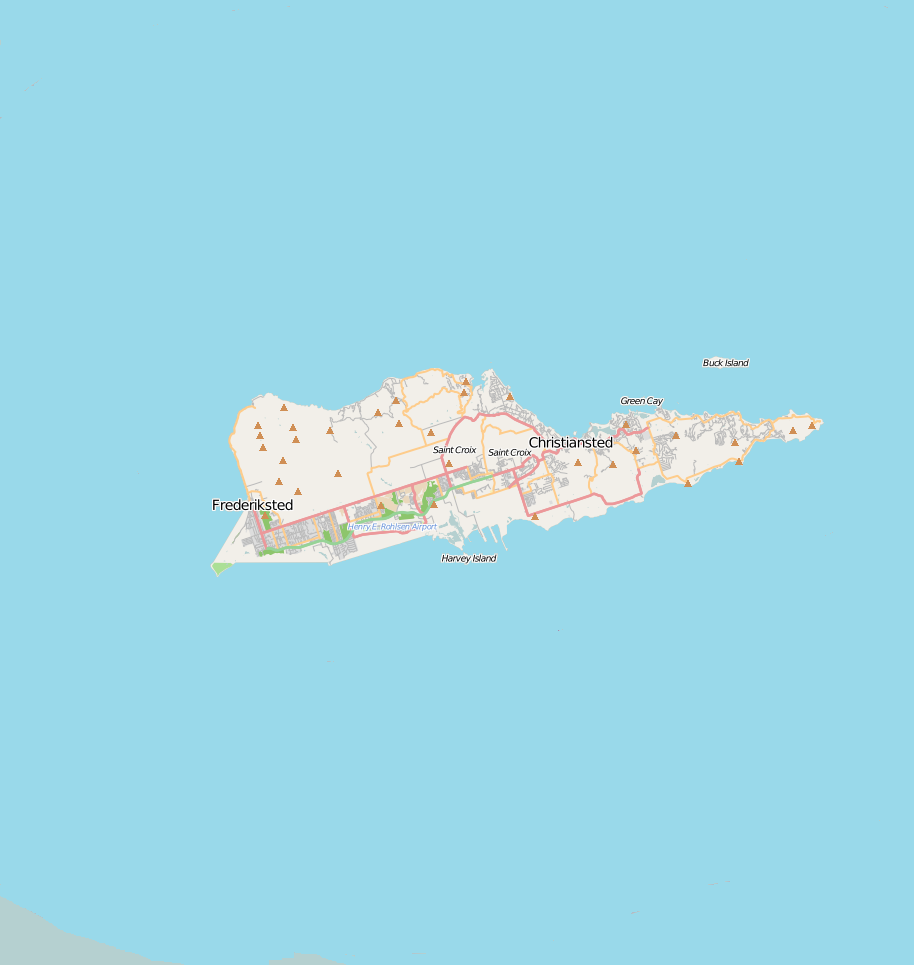
- Location within Saint Croix, US Virgin Islands Location within the U.S. Virgin Islands
- Location: Virgin Islands, United States
- Nearest city: Christiansted, VI
- Coordinates: 17°46′1″N 64°39′57″W
- Area: 14 acres (5.7 ha)
- Established: 1977
- Visitors: 0 (in 2006)
- Governing body: U.S. Fish and Wildlife Service
- Website: Green Cay National Wildlife Refuge

U.S. National Natural Landmark
- Designated: 1980

Green Cay National Wildlife Refuge, encompasses the 6 ha (14 acre) island of Green Cay lying midway between the town of Christiansted and Buck Island Reef National Monument, just north of Saint Croix in the United States Virgin Islands of the Caribbean. It is administered as part of the Caribbean Islands National Wildlife complex. There is a smaller "Green Cay" off the coast of Saint Thomas (18°18′37″N 64°54′28″W).

== Wildlife ==
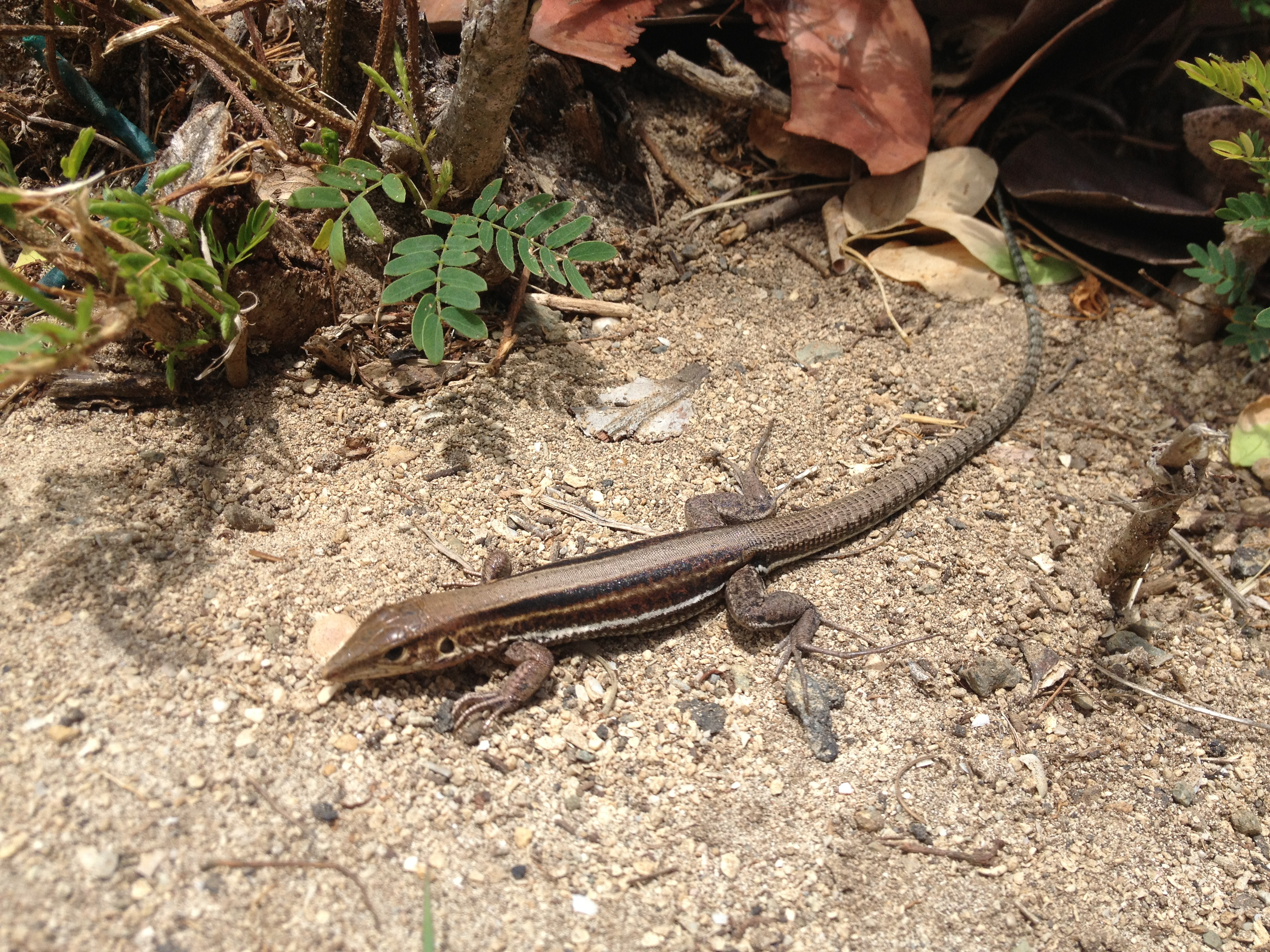
Saint Croix ground lizard

The wildlife refuge preserves habitat for the largest remaining population of the endangered Saint Croix ground lizard. Much smaller populations of ground lizards live on nearby Protestant Cay (17°44′59″N 64°42′10″W) and on Ruth Island. Its extirpation from the mainland of Saint Croix is generally attributed to the introduction of the small Indian mongoose. In 2008, the National Park Service reintroduced the lizard to Buck Island, translocating 57 individuals from Green Cay.

=== Important Bird Area ===
Green Cay has, along with the nearby Southgate Coastal Reserve, been recognised as an Important Bird Area (IBA) by BirdLife International because they support populations of green-throated caribs, Antillean crested hummingbirds, American coots, brown pelicans, laughing gulls, least terns, royal terns, Caribbean elaenias and pearly-eyed thrashers.

== See also ==
- List of National Wildlife Refuges
