= Savana Island, U.S. Virgin Islands =

Savana Island Lighthouse
- Location: Savana Island, United States Virgin Islands, United States
- Coordinates: 18°20′15″N 65°04′59″W

Tower
- Markings: White
- Power source: solar power

Light
- Focal height: 91 m (299 ft)
- Range: 7 nmi (13 km; 8.1 mi)
- Characteristic: Fl W 4s

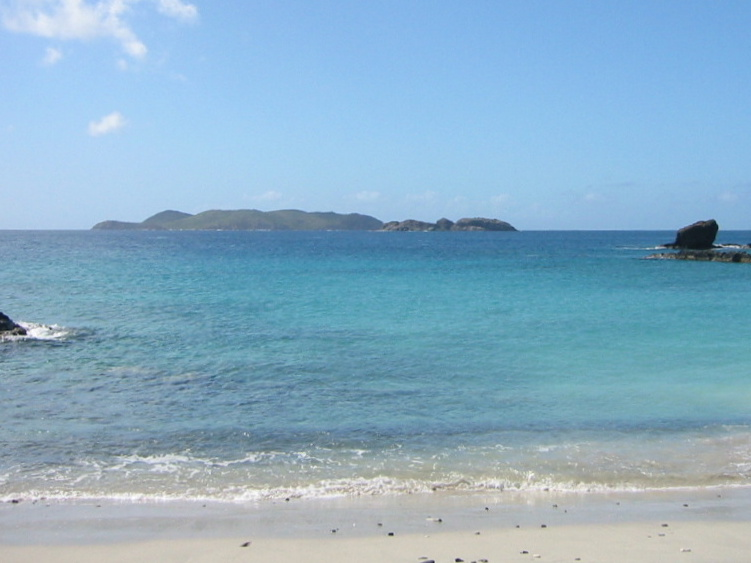

Savana Island is an islet of the United States Virgin Islands. It is located off the West End of St. Thomas at 18°20'N 65°05'W, approximately 7 miles west of Cyril E. King Airport. (See also Minor islands of the United States Virgin Islands).

A lighthouse is located on the island.

== See also ==
- List of lighthouses in the United States Virgin Islands
