= Henley Cay =

Island in the United States Virgin Islands

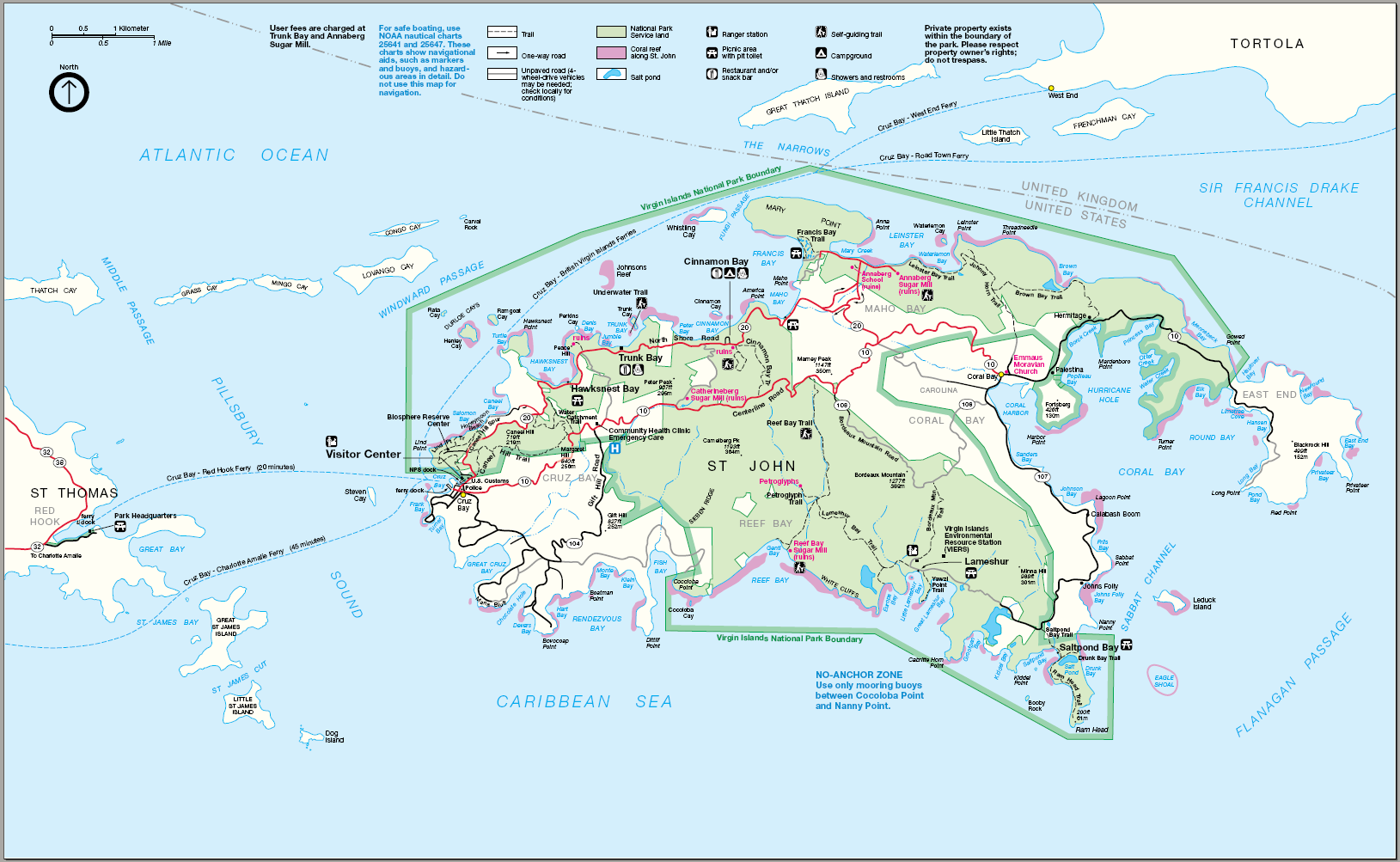
- Map of the Virgin Islands National Park with Henley Cay in the northwest.

- Location in the Caribbean Henley Cay (the Caribbean)

Geography
- Location: Caribbean Sea
- Coordinates: 18°21′12″N 64°47′36″W

Administration
- United States
- Federal Department: U.S. Department of the Interior
- Federal Agency: U.S. Fish and Wildlife Service
- Capital city: Washington, D.C.
- Largest settlement: New York City
- President: Donald Trump

Henley Cay, previously known as Women's Cay, is an 11-acre tropical islet in the United States Virgin Islands. The cay is 300 yards in diameter and the largest and southernmost of the Durloe Cays in the Virgin Islands National Park. Henley Cay is situated 2,200 feet northwest of Turtle Bay on the island of Saint John, separated from the island by the Durloe Channel. The cay is 70 feet high and has a pier on its southern side, although it is uninhabited. The island is known as a snorkeling and kayaking destination, but is also visited for its white sandy beaches. Companies offer guided kayak tours from Cruz Bay, Honeymoon Bay, and Caneel Bay to Henley- and Lovango Cays.

== See also ==
- Islands of the United States Virgin Islands
