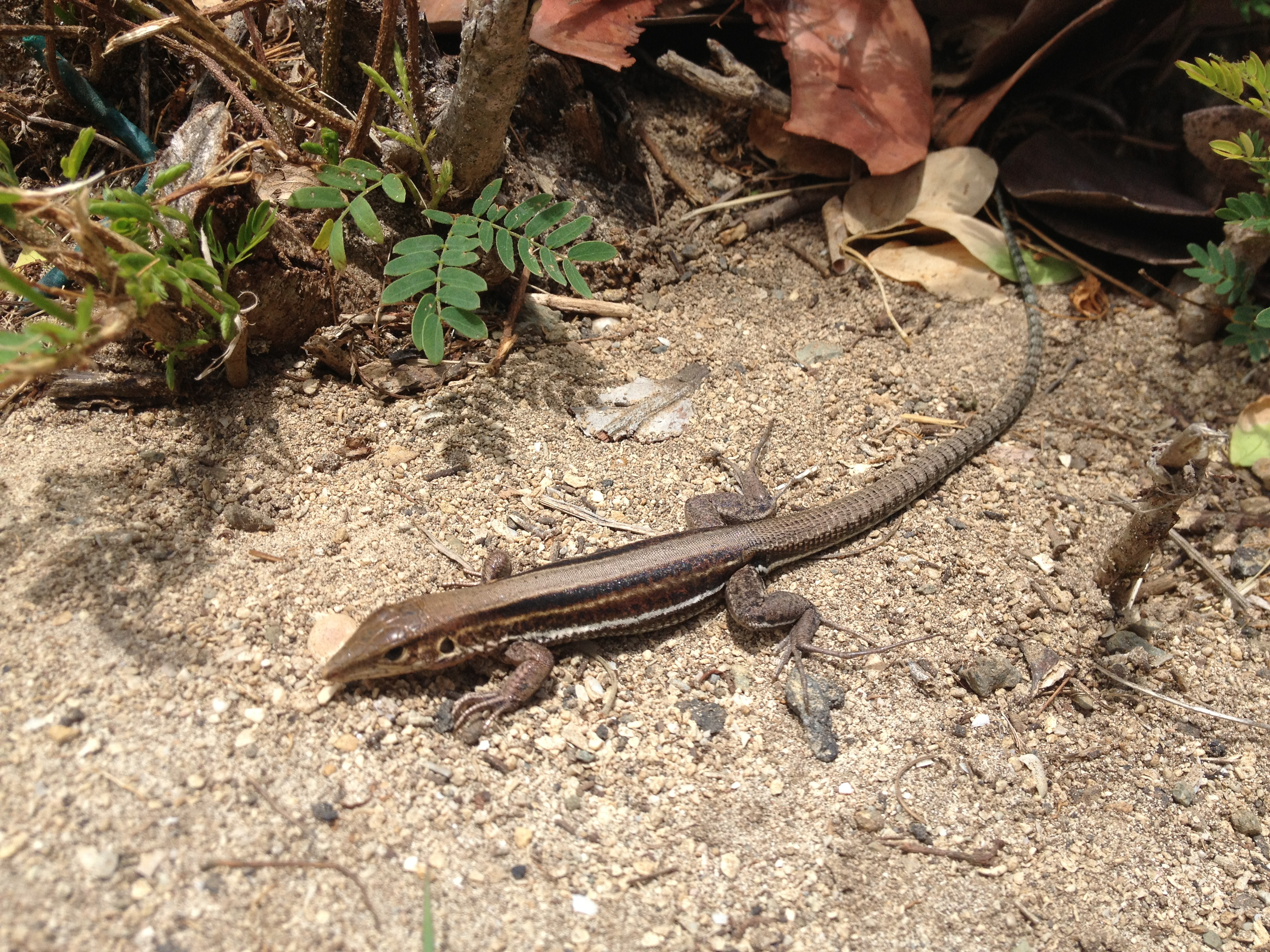
- on Protestant Island

Conservation status
- Endangered (IUCN 3.1)

Scientific classification
- Kingdom: Animalia
- Phylum: Chordata
- Class: Reptilia
- Order: Squamata
- Family: Teiidae
- Genus: Pholidoscelis
- Species: P. polops

Binomial name
- Pholidoscelis polops Cope, 1863

Synonyms
- Ameiva polops

= Saint Croix ground lizard =

Species of lizard

The Saint Croix ground lizard (Pholidoscelis polops) is a small lizard endemic to the U.S. Virgin Islands.

== Description ==
Growing to a size of between 35 and 90 mm (excluding the tail), adults have a pattern of light brown, dark brown and white longitudinal stripes down their back. Below these are a series of narrow brown, black and white vertical stripes, which extend from the sides down to the stomach. The stomach is white with bright blue markings (males), and the rest of the underside is a deep pinkish-red hue. The tail changes from a brown color near the body with alternating rings of blue and black. The entire tail of juveniles and hatchlings is a bright blue color. It eats virtually any prey item, including berries, amphipods, moths, ants and small hermit crabs.

== Habitat ==
The lizard is mainly found in beach areas and upland forest. Once found on St. Croix, the population was extirpated, likely due to habitat loss and the introduction of the small Indian mongoose to the island in the 1880s. The lizard is found on four islands: Protestant Cay, Green Cay, Ruth Cay (a man-made island, constructed by dredging in the 1960s), and Buck Island.

== Status ==
The United States Fish and Wildlife Service listed the St. Croix ground lizard as endangered in 1977 (according to the Endangered Species Act of 1973), and Pholidoscelis polops is currently listed as endangered on the IUCN Red List of Threatened Species. Efforts to save this species include two translocation projects to mongoose-free offshore islands around St. Croix. In 1990, ten lizards from the Protestant Cay population were placed onto Ruth Island. In 2008, fifty-seven lizards from the Green Cay population were placed onto Buck Island.
