= Hams Bluff Light =

Lighthouse US Virgin Islands

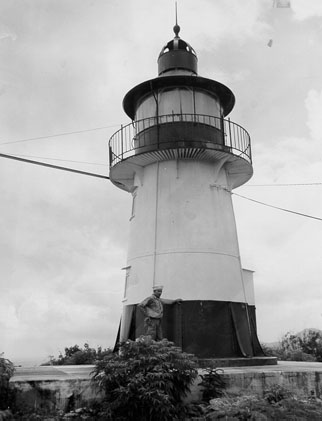
- Hams Bluff Light (historic photo)
- Location: Saint Croix; U.S. Virgin Islands
- Coordinates: 17°46′9.0″N 64°52′15.1″W

Tower
- Constructed: 1915 (first)
- Foundation: concrete base
- Construction: cast iron tower (first) metal skeletal tower (current)
- Height: 35 feet (11 m) (first); 30 feet (9.1 m)(current)
- Shape: conical tower with balcony and lantern (first) square prism skeletal tower (current)
- Markings: white tower (current)
- Operator: United States Navy
- Heritage: National Register of Historic Places listed place

Light
- First lit: 2010 (current)
- Deactivated: 2010
- Focal height: 394 feet (120 m) (current)
- Range: 16 nautical miles (30 km; 18 mi)
- Characteristic: Fl (2) W 30s.
- Hans Bluff Light
- U.S. National Register of Historic Places
- Area: less than one acre
- NRHP reference No.: 100004382
- Added to NRHP: September 16, 2019

The Hams Bluff Light is an historic lighthouse on Saint Croix, U.S. Virgin Islands. It was first lit in 1915 under the Danish Government. It was since transferred to the United States Lighthouse Service and later came under the jurisdiction of the United States Coast Guard. The historic tower has been abandoned; the beacon is now mounted on an adjacent new truss tower. The light displays two white flashes every 30 seconds at a focal plane of 394 feet (120 m). The lighthouse was listed on the United States National Register of Historic Places in 2019.

== Gallery ==
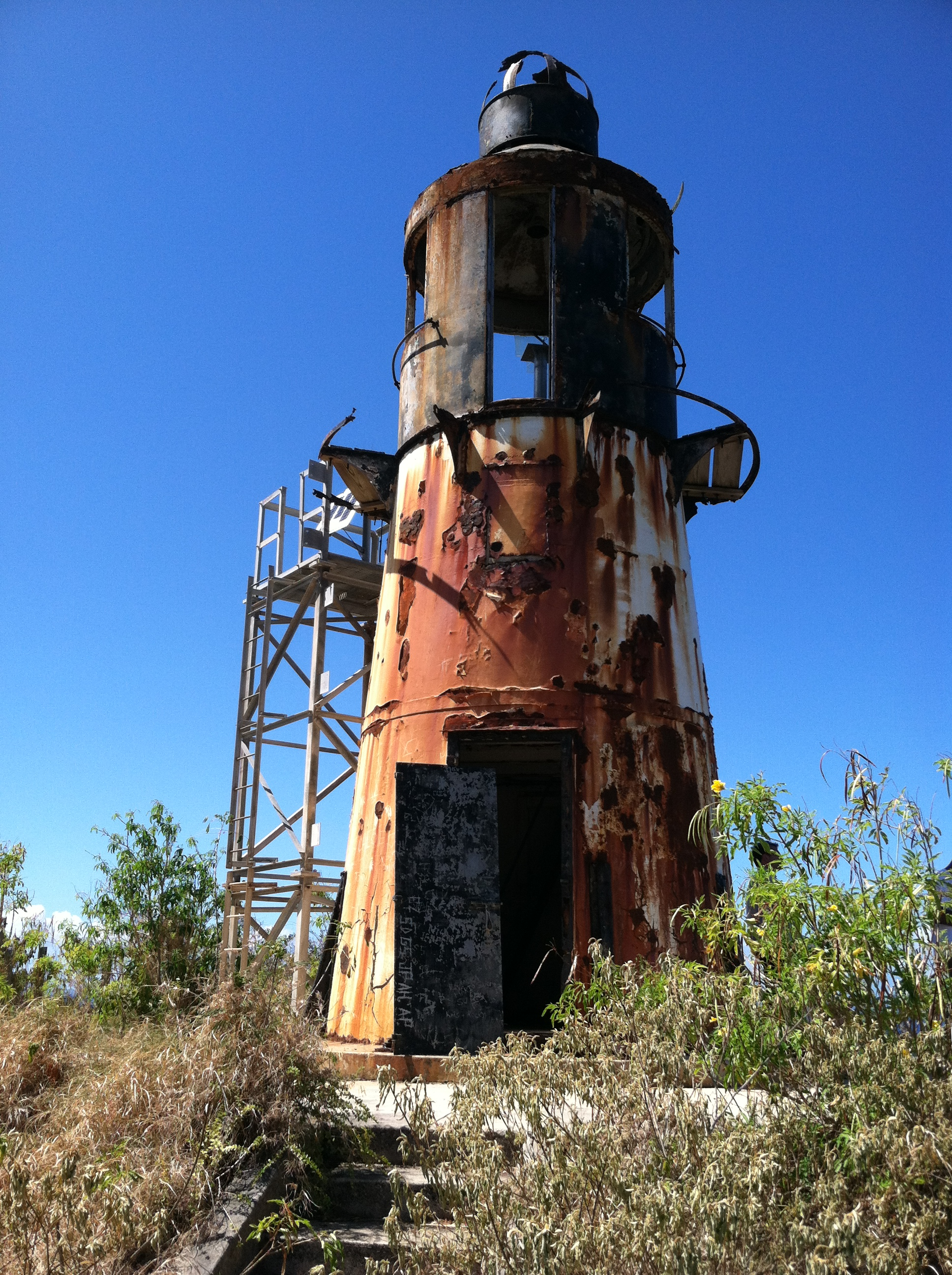
Hams Bluff Light, 2014

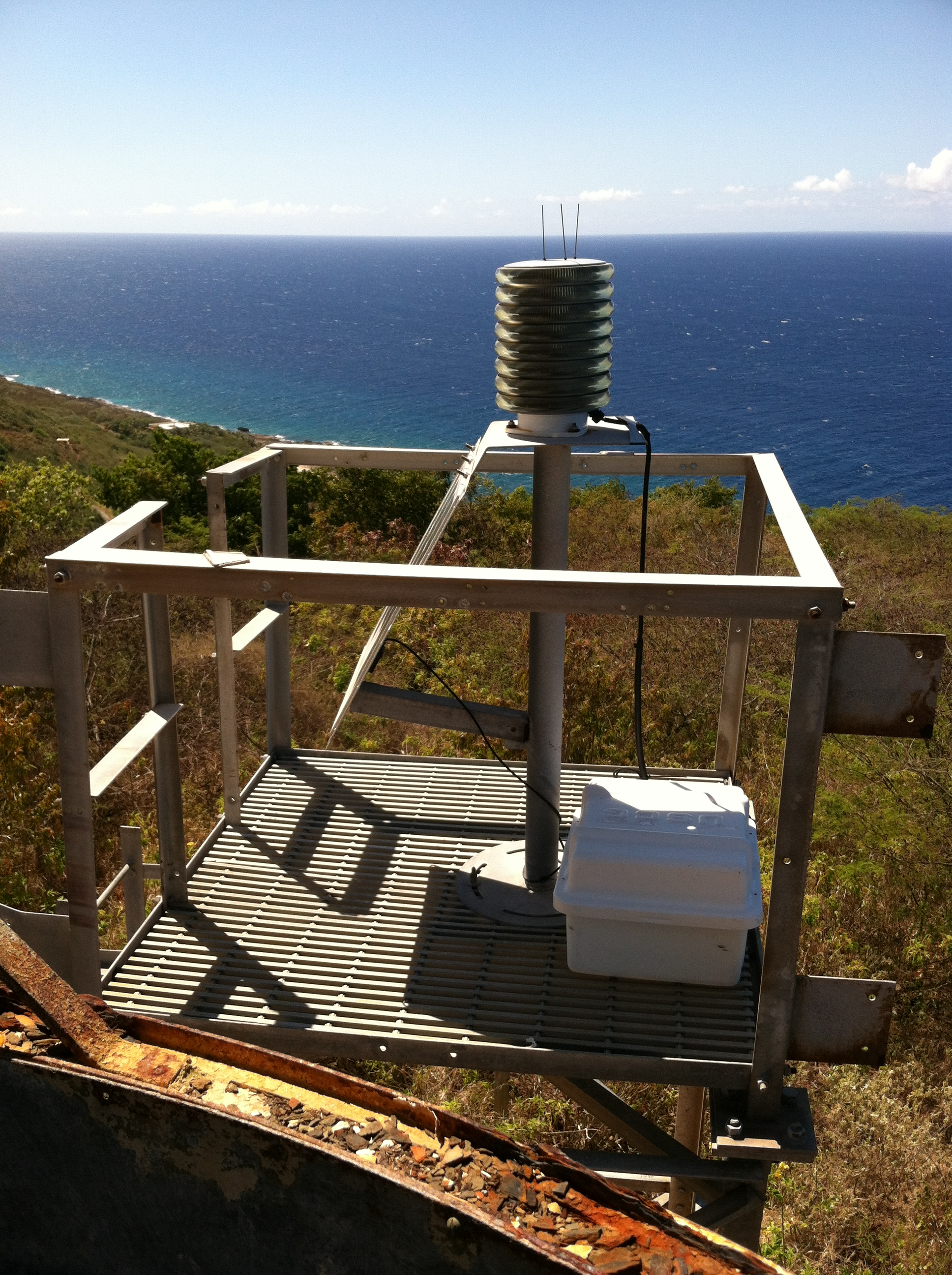
Beacon on new truss tower, 2014

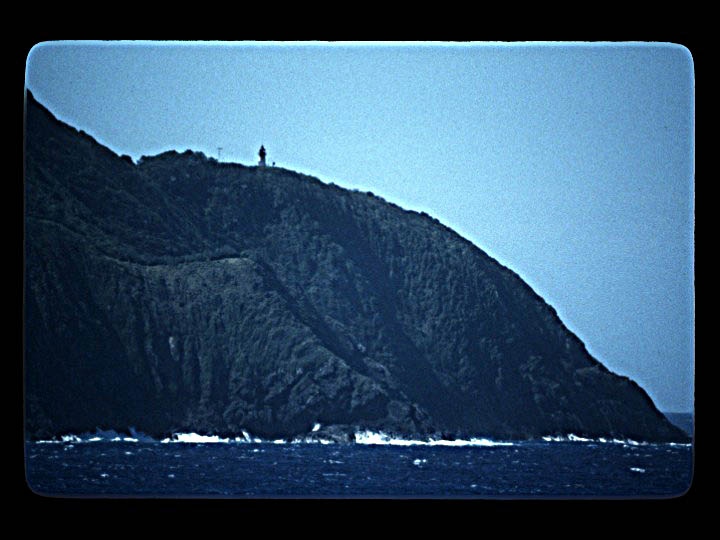
View from the sea

== See also ==
- List of lighthouses in the United States Virgin Islands
