= Inner Brass, U.S. Virgin Islands =

Inner Brass
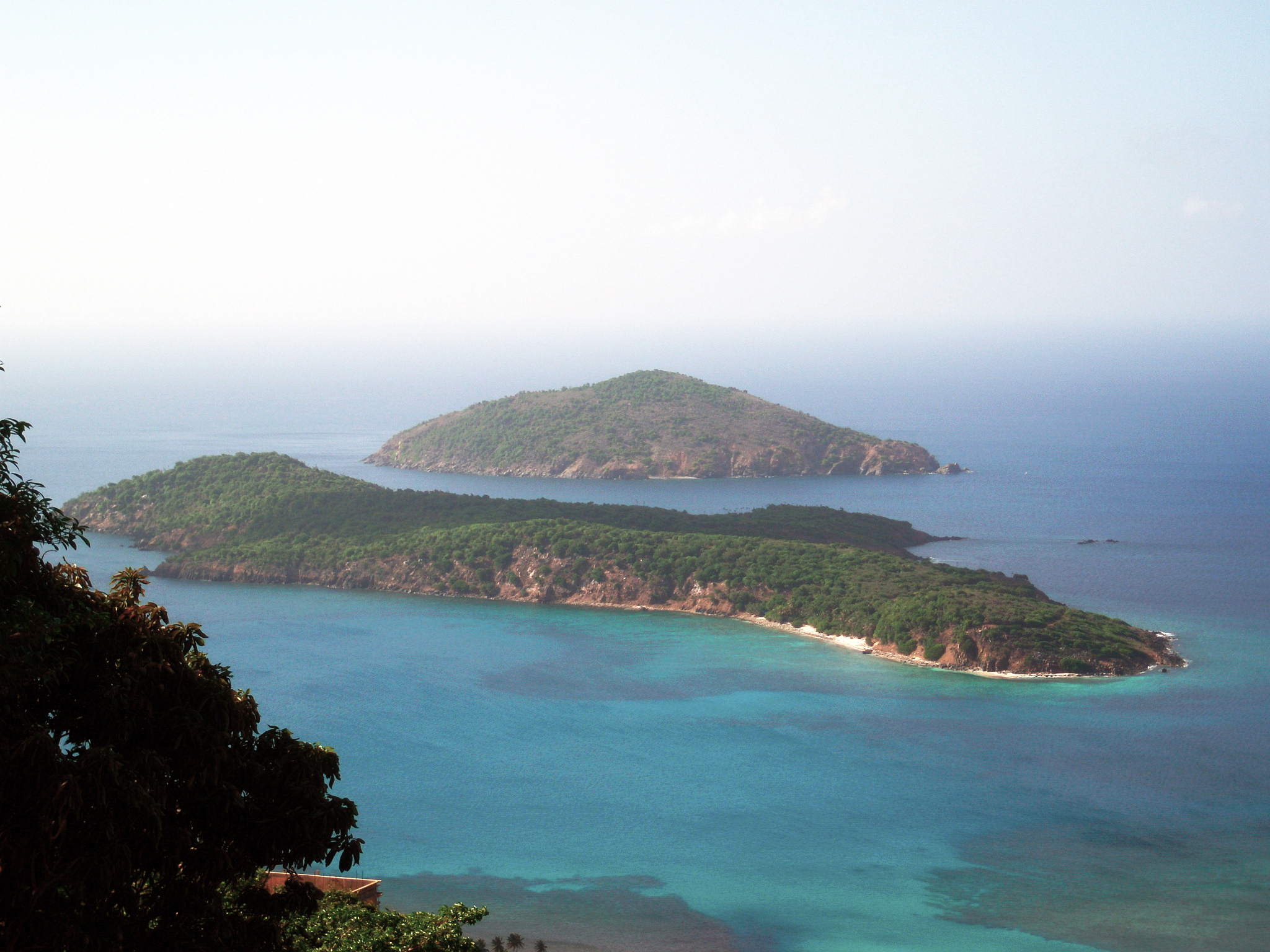
- Inner Brass in the foreground and the Outer Brass in the background.

- Location in the Caribbean Inner Brass, U.S. Virgin Islands (the Caribbean)

Geography
- Location: Caribbean Sea
- Coordinates: 18°22′59″N 64°58′15″W

Administration
- United States; United States Virgin Islands
- Federal Department: U.S. Department of the Interior
- Federal Agency: U.S. Fish and Wildlife Service
- Capital city: Washington, D.C.
- Largest settlement: New York City
- President: Donald J Trump

Inner Brass Island is a 130-acre undeveloped tropical Caribbean island, situated 0.4 miles north off the Nordside of Saint Thomas in the United States Virgin Islands. There is a resort site located here, along with white sandy beaches, tropical reefs, and also a helicopter pad. It is reached by boat or kayaking from St. Thomas' north shore.
