= Buck Island National Wildlife Refuge =

Protected area in the United States Virgin Islands

- IUCN category IV (habitat/species management area)
- Location within the U.S. Virgin Islands Location within the Caribbean
- Location: Virgin Islands, United States
- Nearest city: Charlotte Amalie, VI
- Coordinates: 18.2757885°N 64.8870868°W
- Area: 45 acres (18 ha)
- Established: 1969
- Governing body: U.S. Fish and Wildlife Service
- Original lighthouse
- Constructed: 1913
- Construction: steel (tower), concrete (foundation)
- Height: 25 ft (7.6 m)
- Shape: square frustum tower with balcony and lantern
- Markings: White (tower), black (lantern)
- Operator: Buck Island National Wildlife Refuge
- Deactivated: 1990s
- Active lighthouse
- Constructed: 1990s
- Height: 12 m (39 ft)
- Shape: square prism metal skeletal tower with balcony and light
- Markings: Unpainted (tower)
- Power source: solar power
- Focal height: 42 m (138 ft)
- Range: 8 nmi (15 km; 9.2 mi)
- Characteristic: Fl W 4s

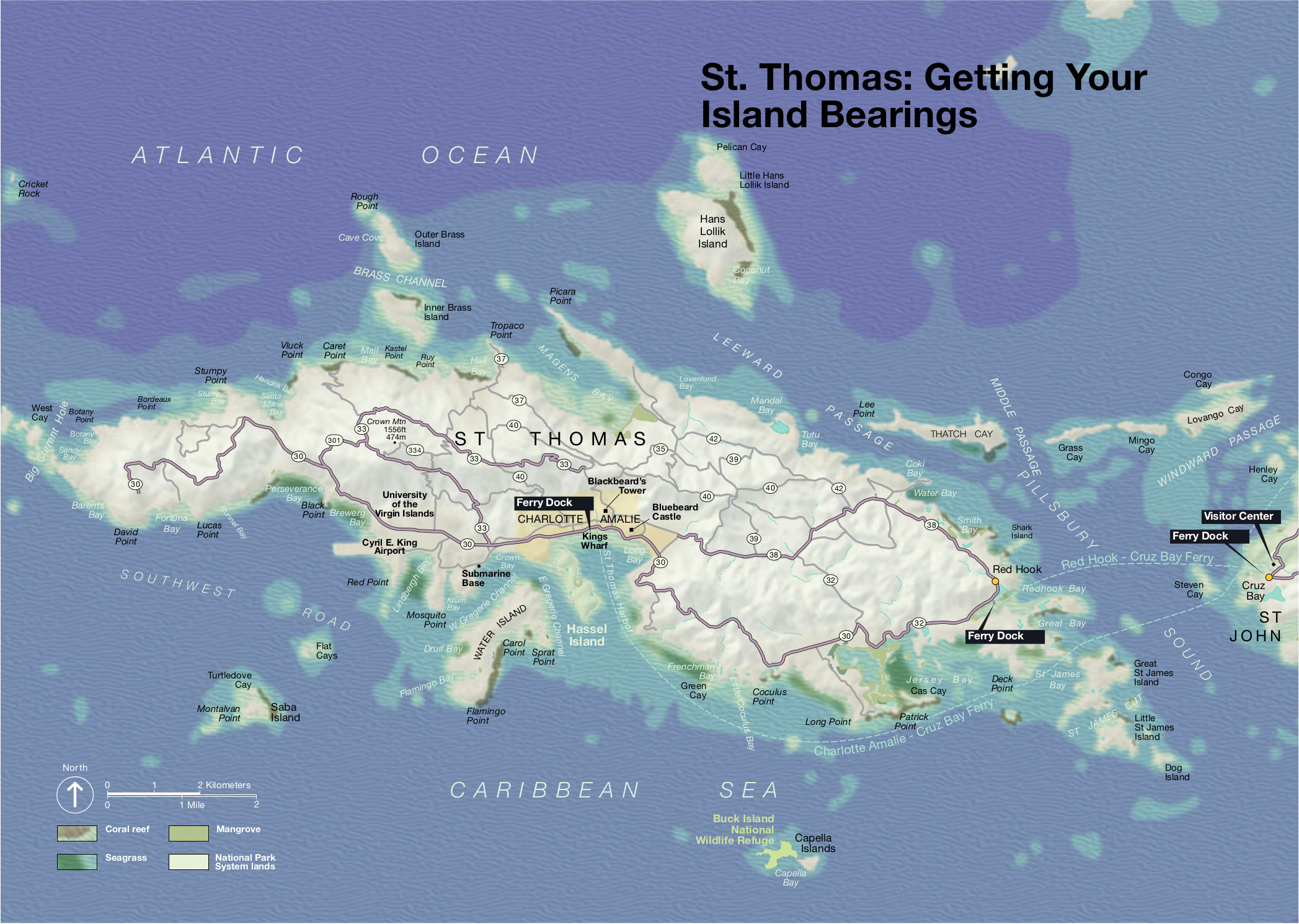
Buck Island National Wildlife Refuge to the south of St. Thomas

Buck Island National Wildlife Refuge is located about 2 miles (4 km) south of the island of St. Thomas in the Virgin Islands of the United States. Adjacent to the refuge is Capella Island, about half the size of Buck, owned by the territorial government. There is a second Buck Island just north of St. Croix that is the centerpiece of Buck Island Reef National Monument.

The refuge is characterized by a thorn scrub habitat with rocky coastline surrounded by spectacular reefs. A lighthouse (still maintained by the United States Coast Guard) stands over 45 acres (180,000 m^{2}) of cactus and grassland. The island was transferred to the United States Fish and Wildlife Service due to "its value for migratory birds". The U.S. Navy transferred some lands in 1969 and the remainder was received from the Coast Guard in 1981. The surrounding waters contain reefs and a shipwreck that attract large numbers of snorkelers, divers, and boaters.

The islands are surrounded by beautiful coral reef habitats and an artificial reef – a shipwreck. The marine area is home to a variety of fish and animals, in particular endangered sea turtles.

Turtle Cove, on the northwest side, is densely populated with sea turtles. Tours of Turtle Cove are available from St. John and St. Thomas.

Buck Island NWR is administered as part of the Caribbean Islands National Wildlife complex.

== See also ==
- List of lighthouses in the United States Virgin Islands
- List of National Wildlife Refuges
