= Mingo Cay, U.S. Virgin Islands =

Coordinates: 18°21′35″N 64°49′11″W

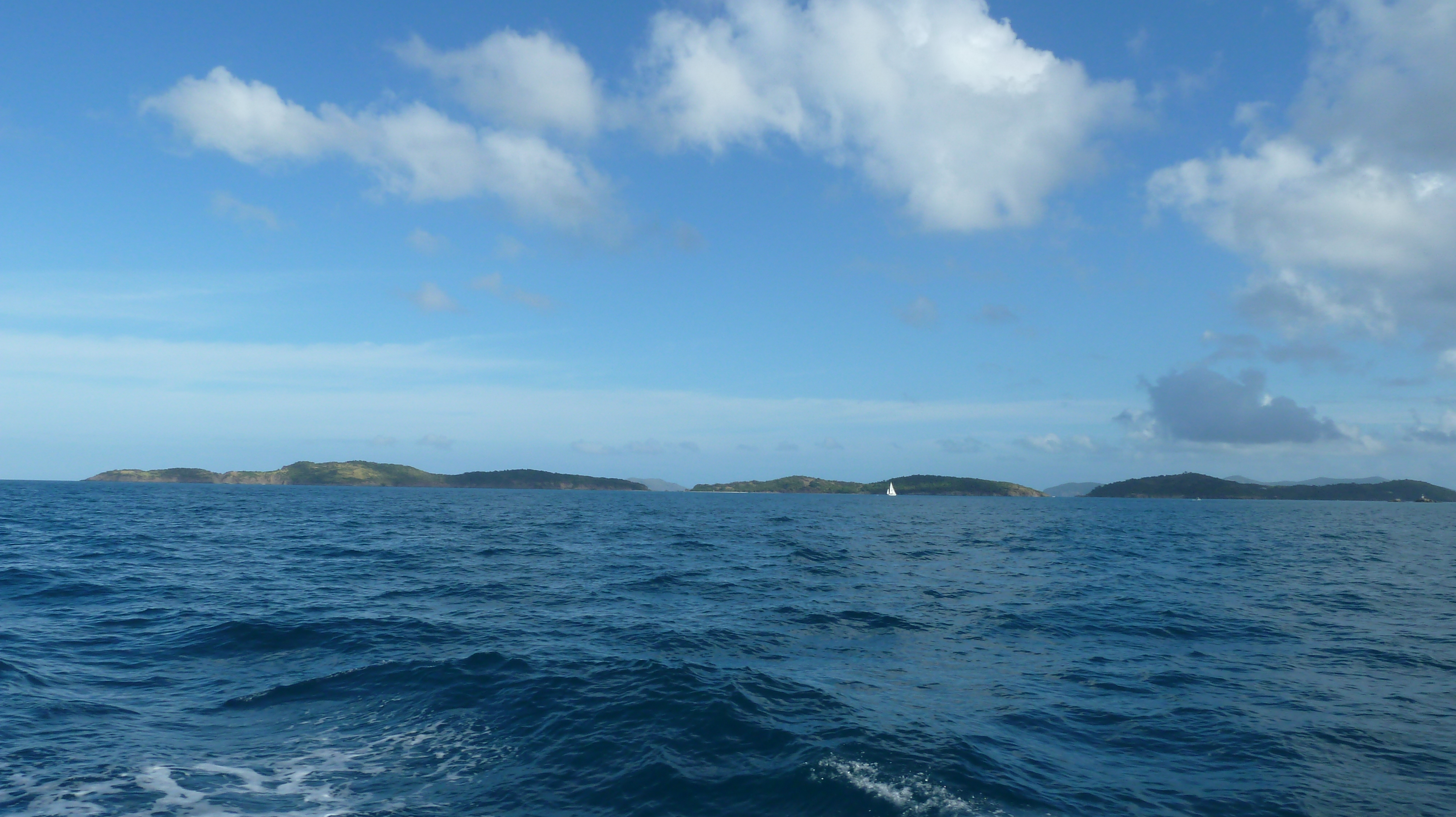
Grass Cay (left), Mingo Cay (middle), and Lovango Cay (right), as seen from a ferry

Mingo Cay is a rugged, uninhabited, 48-acre (19 ha) island in the United States Virgin Islands. North of the Pillsbury Sound and measuring 0.7 miles (1.1 km) long, it is located 2 miles (3 km) northwest of the island of St. John and 2 miles (3 km) northeast of the island of St. Thomas. Administratively, it is part of the Central subdistrict of St. John.

Formerly privately owned, the island was donated to a land conservation trust in 2021.
