= Outer Brass, U.S. Virgin Islands =

Outer Brass
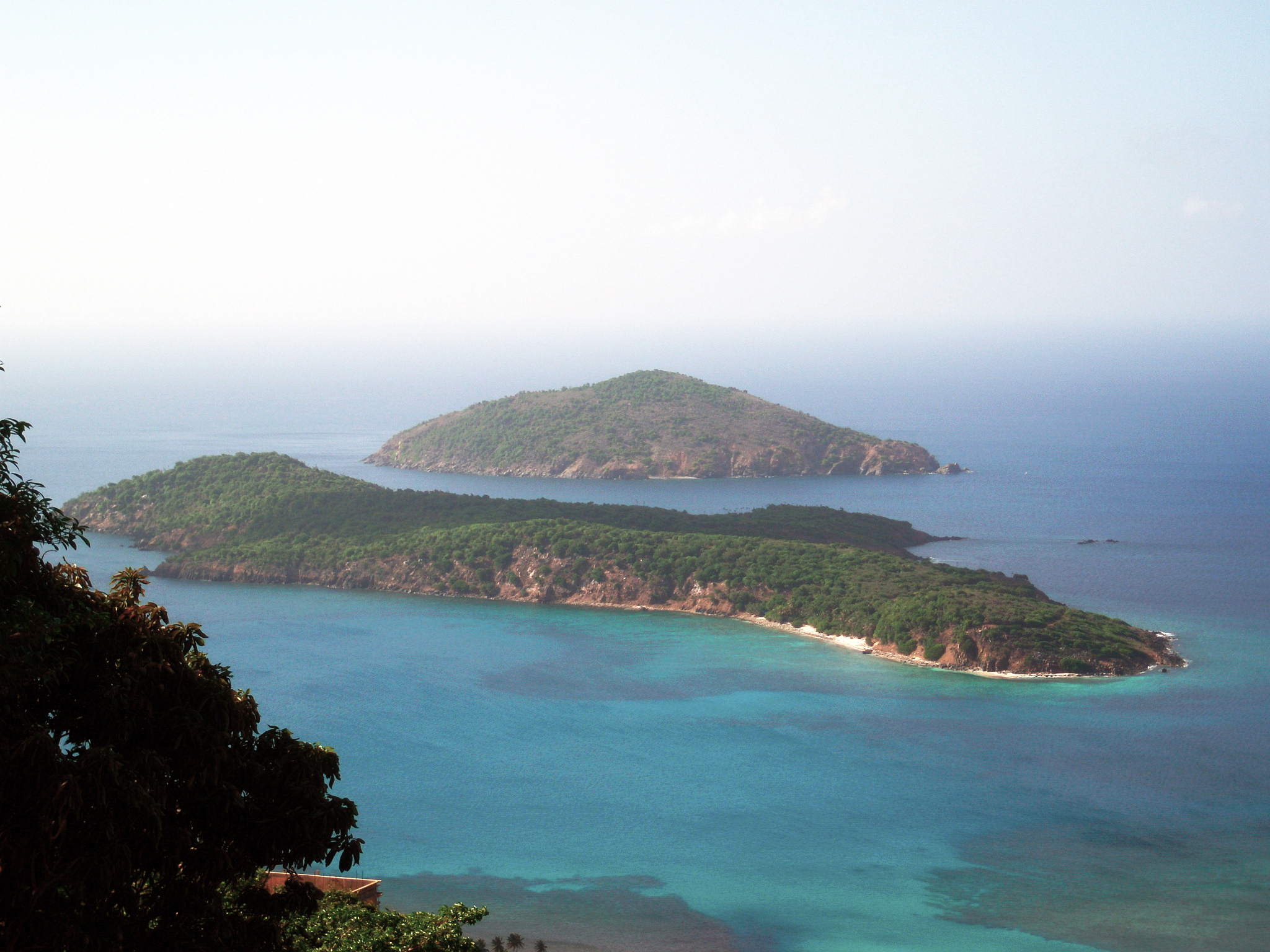
- Inner Brass in the foreground and the Outer Brass in the background.

- Location in the Caribbean Outer Brass, U.S. Virgin Islands (the Caribbean)

Geography
- Location: Caribbean Sea
- Coordinates: 18°23′41″N 64°58′16″W

Administration
- United States; United States Virgin Islands
- Federal Department: U.S. Department of the Interior
- Federal Agency: U.S. Fish and Wildlife Service
- Capital city: Washington, D.C.
- Largest settlement: New York City
- President: Donald J Trump

Outer Brass is an island of the United States Virgin Islands, located off of Nordside, St. Thomas. The island is a wildlife sanctuary administered by the U.S. Virgin Islands territorial government.

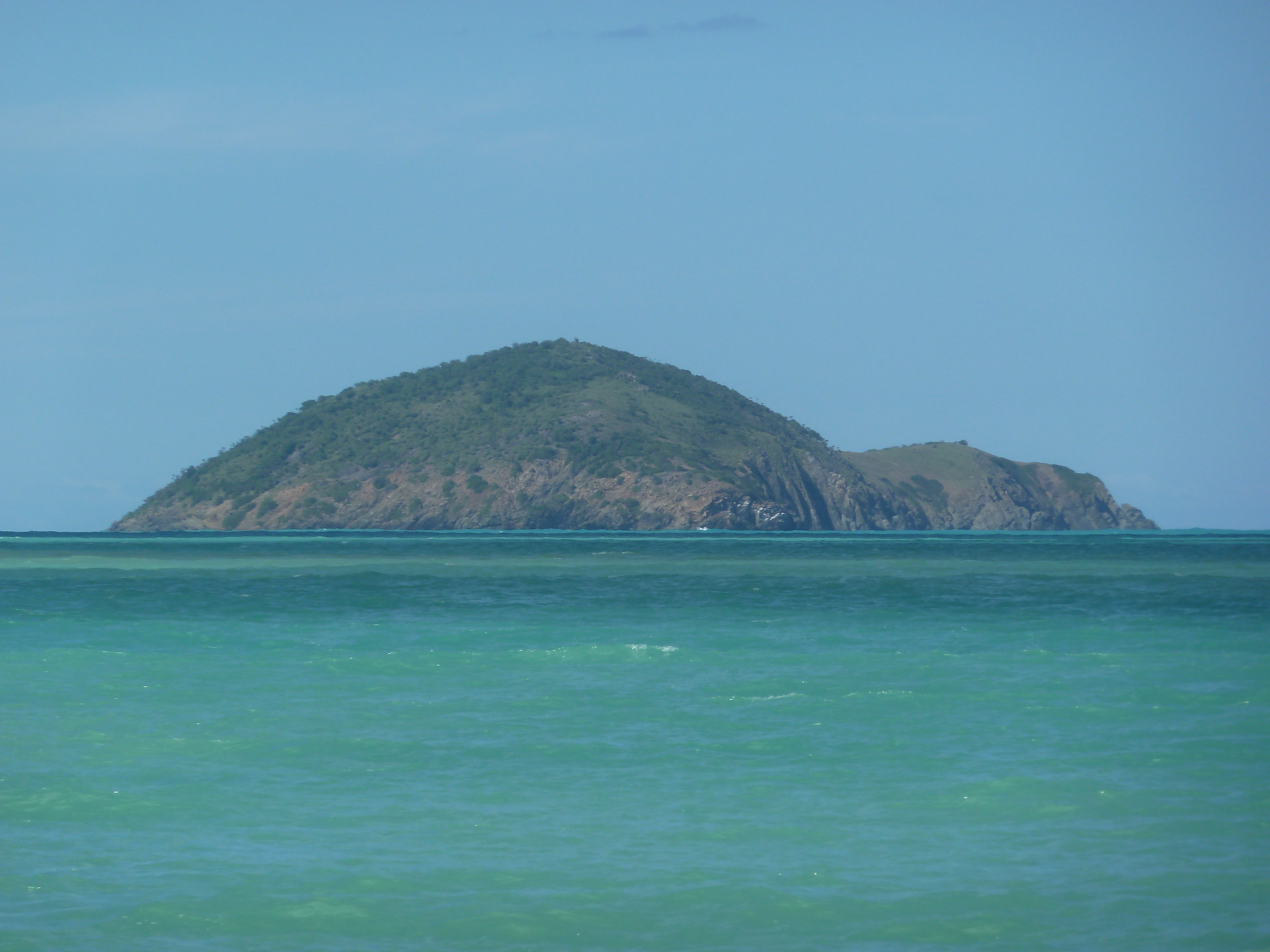
Outer Brass

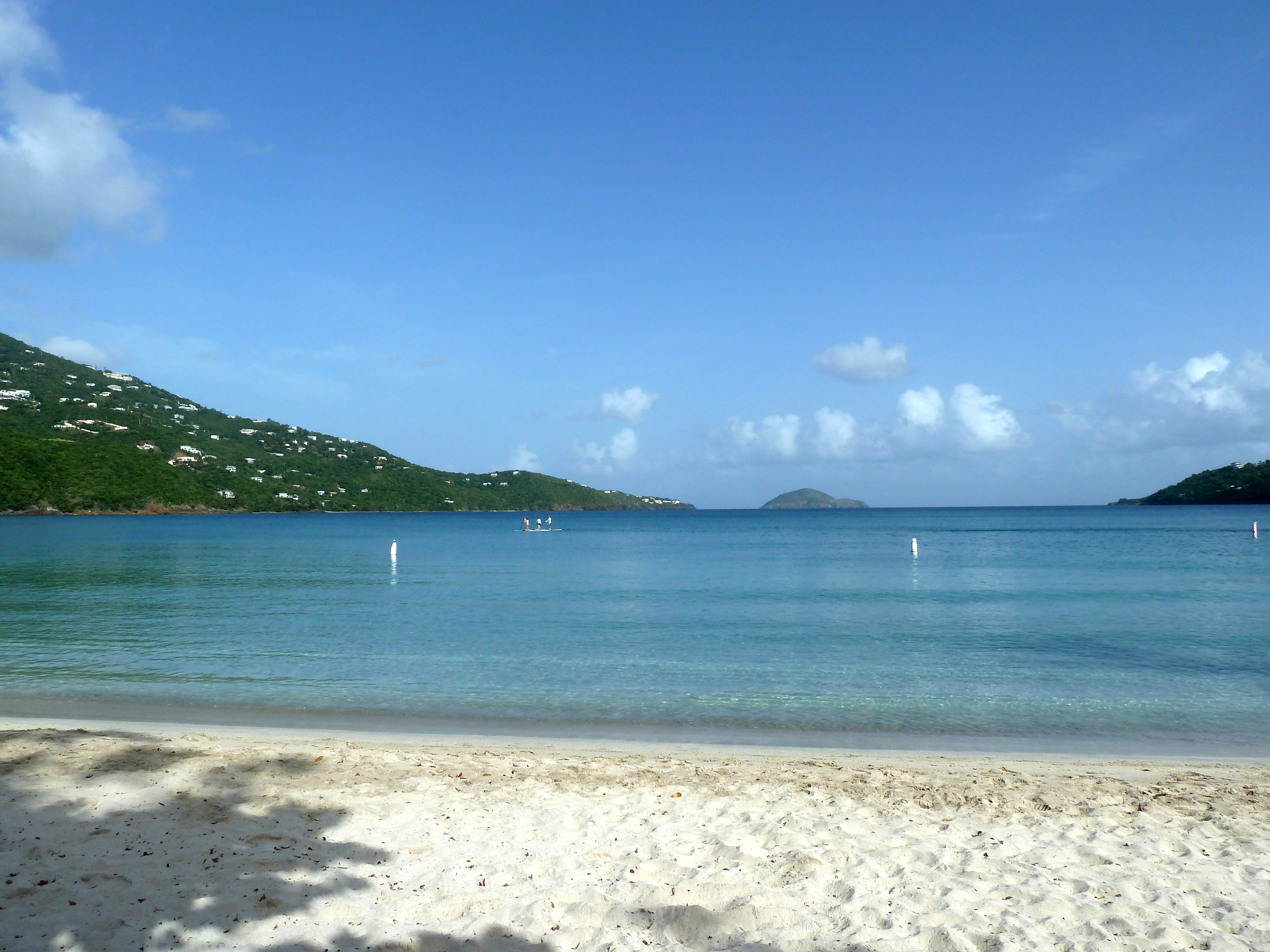
Magens Bay and Outer Brass on the horizon.
