= Johns Folly, U.S. Virgin Islands =

Coordinates: 18°19′10″N 64°42′12″W

Johns Folly is a neighborhood on the island of Saint John in the United States Virgin Islands. It is located on the east side of the island, south of Coral Bay and north of Salt Pond Bay.
