= Ruth Island =

Island in the U.S. Virgin Islands

- Location in the Caribbean Ruth Island (the Caribbean)

Geography
- Location: Caribbean Sea
- Coordinates: 17°41′1″N 64°45′43″W
- Area: 40 acres (16 ha)

Administration
- United States
- Federal Department: U.S. Department of the Interior
- Federal Agency: U.S. Fish and Wildlife Service
- Capital city: Washington, D.C.
- Largest settlement: New York City
- President: Donald John Trump

Ruth Island (also known as Ruth Cay) is an artificial island off the southern coast of Saint Croix, U.S. Virgin Islands near Port Alucroix. It was created in the mid-1960s from the dredging of Krauses Lagune and is about 40 acres (16 ha).

Because the island is free of small Indian mongooses (Urva auropunctata) biologists introduced the endangered Saint Croix ground lizard (Pholidoscelis polops) from the Protestant Cay population. Today there are about 30 ground lizards on Ruth Island.
