= The Buccaneer (resort) =

Hotel and resort on Saint Croix, U.S. Virgin Islands

Coordinates: 17°45′20″N 64°40′55″W

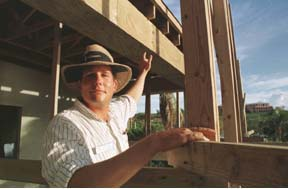
Robert A. Armstrong, owner of the Buccaneer Hotel in 1998

The Buccaneer, formally known as The Buccaneer Beach & Golf Resort, is a luxury historic hotel and beach resort about 3 miles (4.8 km) northeast of Christiansted, on the island of Saint Croix, U.S. Virgin Islands, beyond Altona Lagoon. Set in 240 acres with an 18-hole golf course and three private beaches, it was opened by the Armstrong family as an inn in 1947 and was listed on the National Registry of the Historic Hotels of America in 2006.

== History ==
A Knight of Malta constructed a manor house in 1653, though the estate reportedly dates back further than this. Since then, it has served as a private home, a sugar mill, a cotton plantation, and a cattle estate. A sugar mill was constructed in 1733, and a slave quarters was built sometime in the 18th century.

In 1947, the property was acquired by the Armstrong family, who opened it as an 11-room inn.

Jimmy Hamilton, a jazz clarinetist who formerly performed in the Duke Ellington Orchestra and moved to the Virgin Islands in virtual retirement, recorded the live album Rediscovered at the Buccaneer at the hotel. It was released in 1985.

In 2006, the hotel was added to the National Registry of the Historic Hotels of America. As of 2011, the hotel was managed by Elizabeth Armstrong. The Buccaneer underwent restoration in 2015. When the islands were seriously affected by hurricanes in 2017, the hotel accommodated Federal Emergency Management Agency (FEMA) operatives.

== Features ==
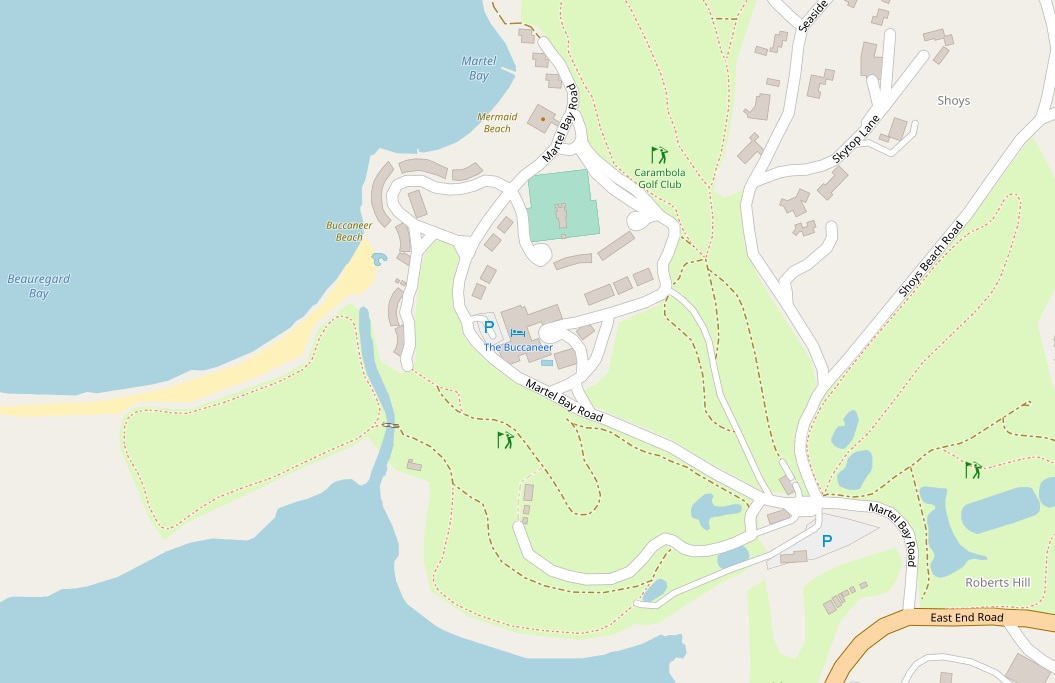
Map of the Buccaneer Resort and surrounding area

The hotel has a gym, spa, pool, three restaurants, and bar. The hotel has 150 rooms, some of which feature 16 feet (4.9 m) high wood ceilings. U.S. News Travel describes the rooms as "elegant and simplistic in design, featuring bright blue-, green- and salmon-colored decor and modern amenities like satellite TVs, minifridges, and private patios or balconies". There are four conference rooms which can hold up to 150 people and 2,500 square feet (230 m^{2}) of exhibition space. The former sugar mill serves as a venue for weddings, and the old slave quarters of the plantation is now used for lodging.

Three beaches are let out privately to guests. The resort offers windsurfing, scuba diving, snorkeling, deep-sea fishing, sailing trips and horseback riding. Darwin Porter wrote in 2006 that the hotel also has the best tennis facilities in the U.S. Virgin Islands, with eight all-weather Laykold courts, and hosts tournaments.
