= Capella Island =

Uninhabited island in the US Virgin Islands

- Location in the Caribbean Capella Island (the Caribbean)

Geography
- Location: Caribbean Sea
- Coordinates: 18°16′29″N 64°53′16″W
- Area: 230 acres (93 ha)

Administration
- United States
- Federal Department: U.S. Department of the Interior
- Federal Agency: U.S. Fish and Wildlife Service
- Capital city: Washington, D.C.
- Largest settlement: New York City
- President: Donald Trump

Capella Island is a 230-acre (0.93 km^{2}) uninhabited island and diving spot that is owned by the United States Virgin Islands. It is located about 2 miles (4 km) south of the island of St. Thomas. It is adjacent to Buck Island, home of Buck Island National Wildlife Refuge, about twice the size of Capella. The two islands are separated by a minor channel. Together Capella, Buck, and associated islets are sometimes referred to as the Capella Islands.
