= Carvel Rock (United States Virgin Islands) =

Uninhabited islet of the US Virgin Islands

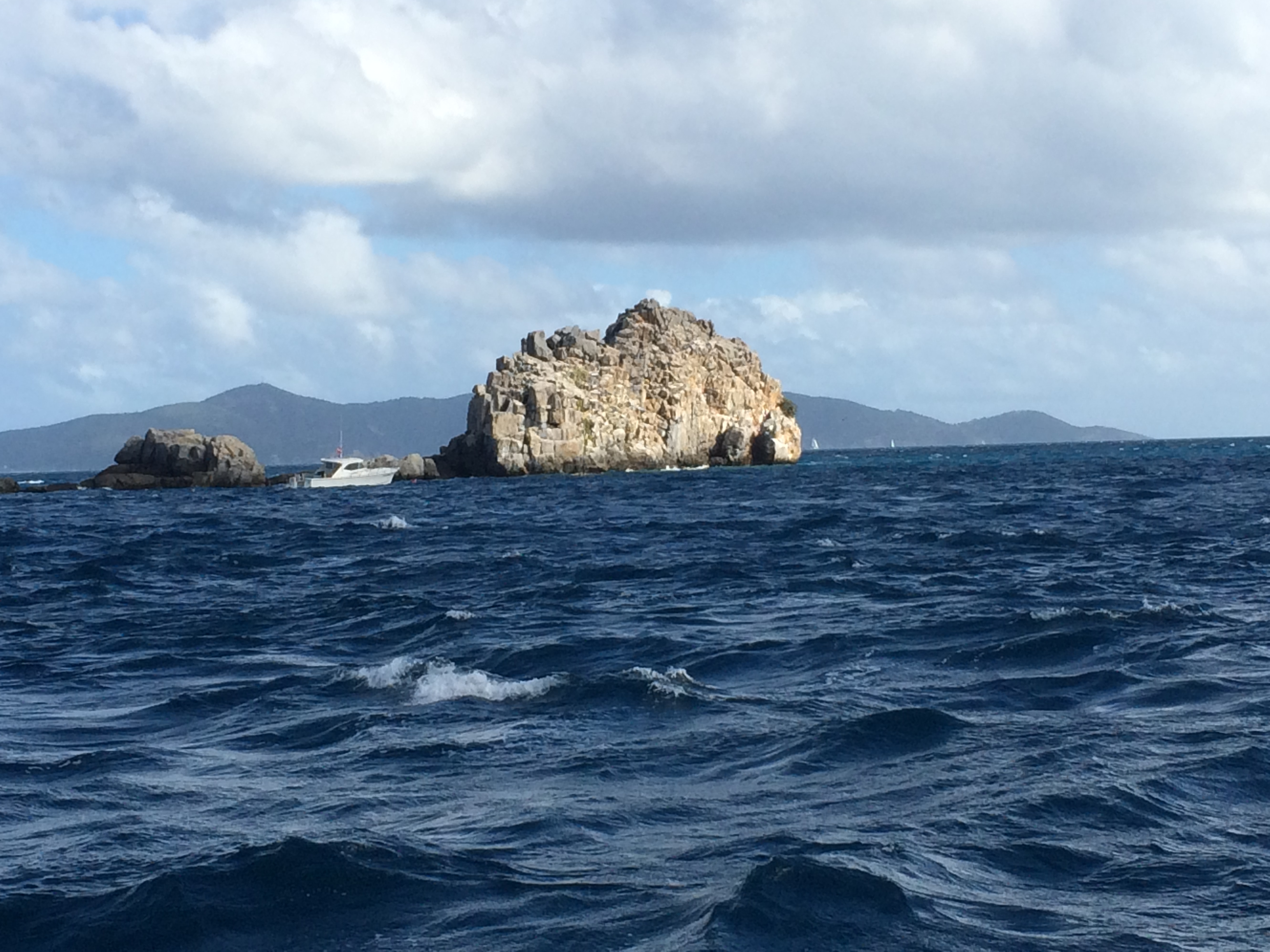
- Scuba boat at Carvel Rock.

- Location in the Caribbean Carvel Rock (United States Virgin Islands) (the Caribbean)

Geography
- Location: Caribbean Sea
- Coordinates: 18.36418°N 64.795758°W
- Area: 2 acres (0.81 ha)

Administration
- United States; United States Virgin Islands
- Federal Department: U.S. Department of the Interior
- Federal Agency: U.S. Fish and Wildlife Service
- Capital city: Washington, D.C.
- Largest settlement: New York City
- President: Donald Trump

Carvel Rock (sometimes spelled Carval Rock) is an uninhabited islet of the US Virgin Islands in the Caribbean, less than 2 acres (8,100 square metres) in size. It is visited by boats as a scuba diving site, but its sheer cliffs and lack of a beach mean that landing would be practically impossible.

It lies immediately east of Lovango Cay and Congo Cay.

Carvel Rock appeared in the premiere episode of The Amazing Race 25, where the 11 competing teams had to climb across the top of the rock before jumping off into the ocean.
