= Christiansted, U.S. Virgin Islands =

Christiansted
- Town
- Town of Christiansted; By Christiansted (Danish)
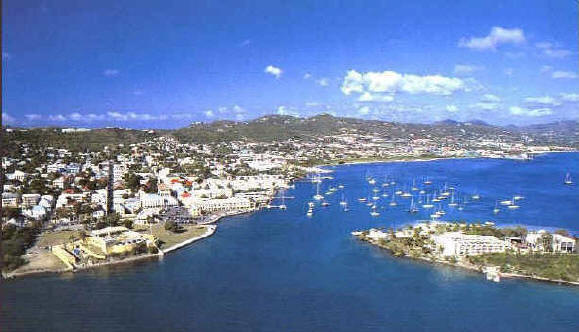
- The town of Christiansted looking South West

- Location within Saint Croix, U.S. Virgin Islands
- Coordinates: 17.75°N 64.75°W
- Sovereign State: United States
- Territory: U.S. Virgin Islands
- Island: Saint Croix
- Established: September 1, 1734
- Named for: Christian VI of Denmark

Population (2020)
  - Total: 1,866
- ZIP code(s): 00820–00824

Christiansted (/ˈkrɪstʃənstɛd/ KRIS-chən-sted, Danish: [kʰʁestjænˈsteð, kʰʁæs-]; Danish for 'Christian's Place') is the largest town on Saint Croix, one of the main islands of the United States Virgin Islands, a territory of the United States of America. The town is named after King Christian VI of Denmark.

== History ==
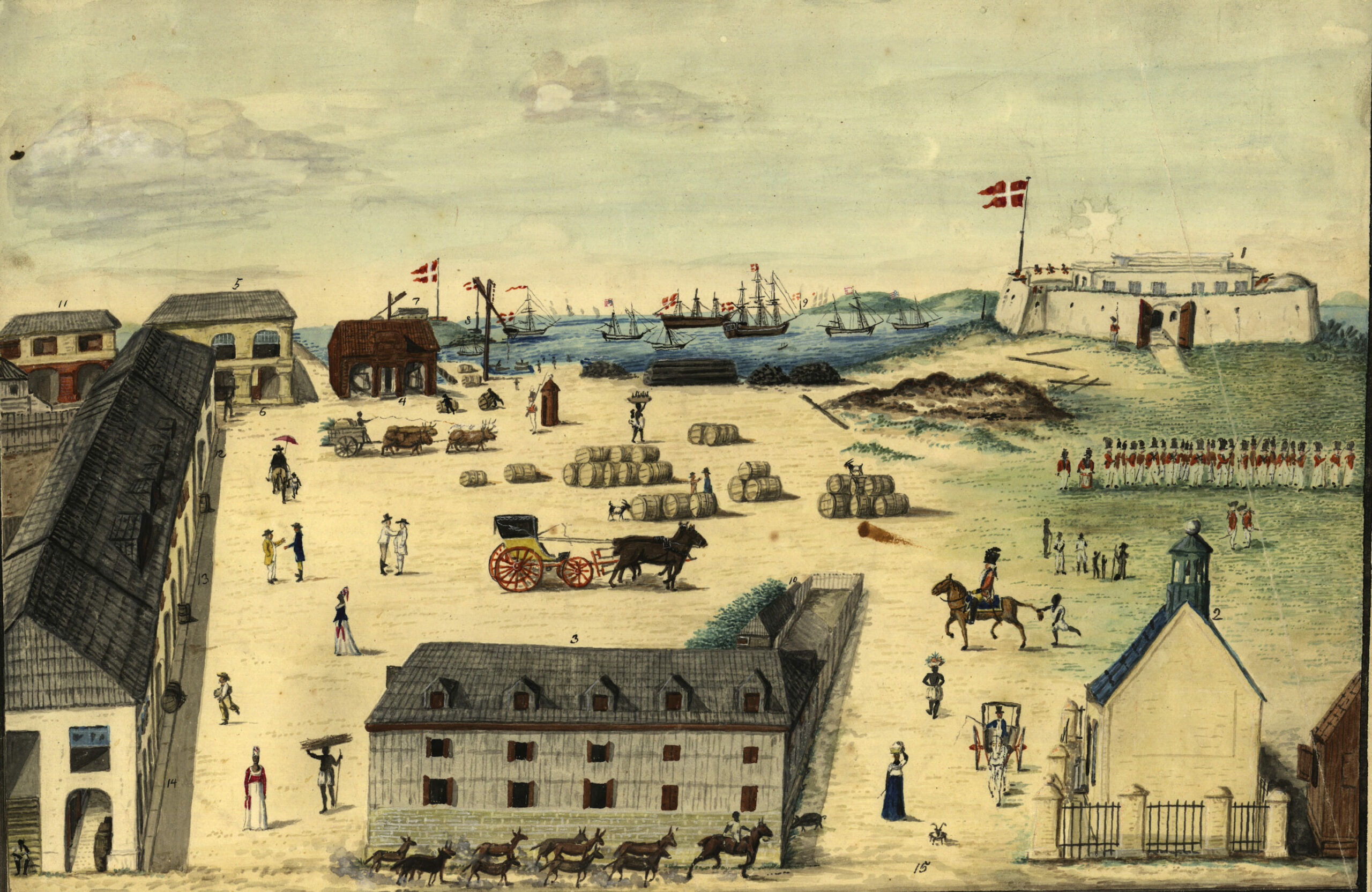
Christiansted in 1815

The town was founded by Captain Frederik Moth after he was made governor of St. Croix in 1733. Departing from St. Thomas, Moth's party had cleared a space for Fort Christianswærn by 5 September. In a ceremony next to this fort on 8 January 1734, the French formally handed the island over to the Danes in the form of the Danish West India and Guinea Company. St. Croix was to be allotted 300 plantations, 215 for sugar and the rest for cotton. The plantations surveyed were 3,000 by 2,000 feet. In addition, the company established a sugar refinery and distillery. The fort was completed by 1740. The 1742 census listed 120 sugar plantations, 122 cotton plantations, 1,906 slaves, about 300 Englishmen, and 60 Danes. By 1743, St. Croix had a hospital. In 1745, the number of slaves had increased to 2,878. By 1754, the town included 83 "white inhabitants", "each of whom owned from a single slave to sixty-six of them", according to Westergaard. Slaves on the island numbered 7,566.

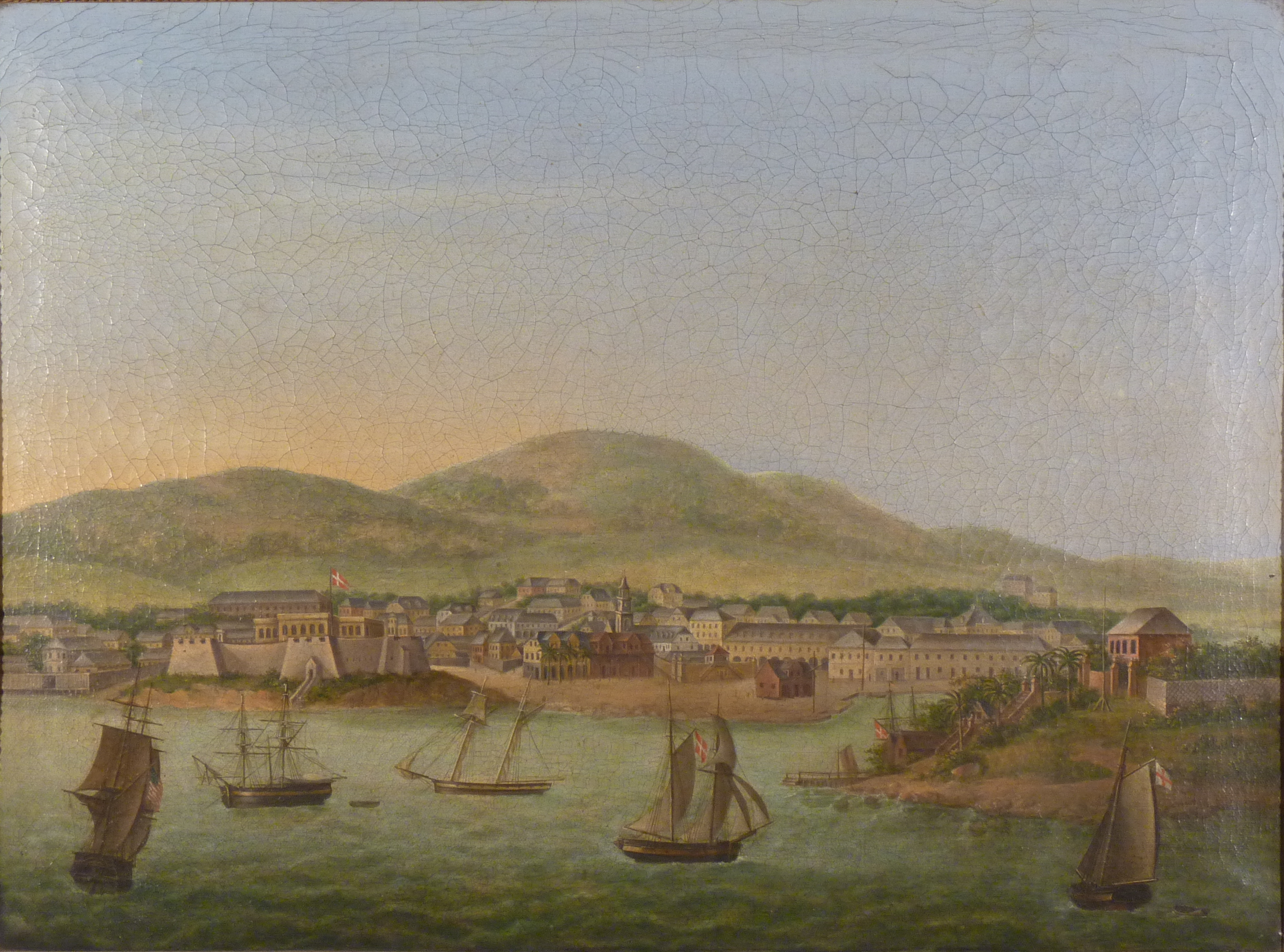
Christiansted in 1825

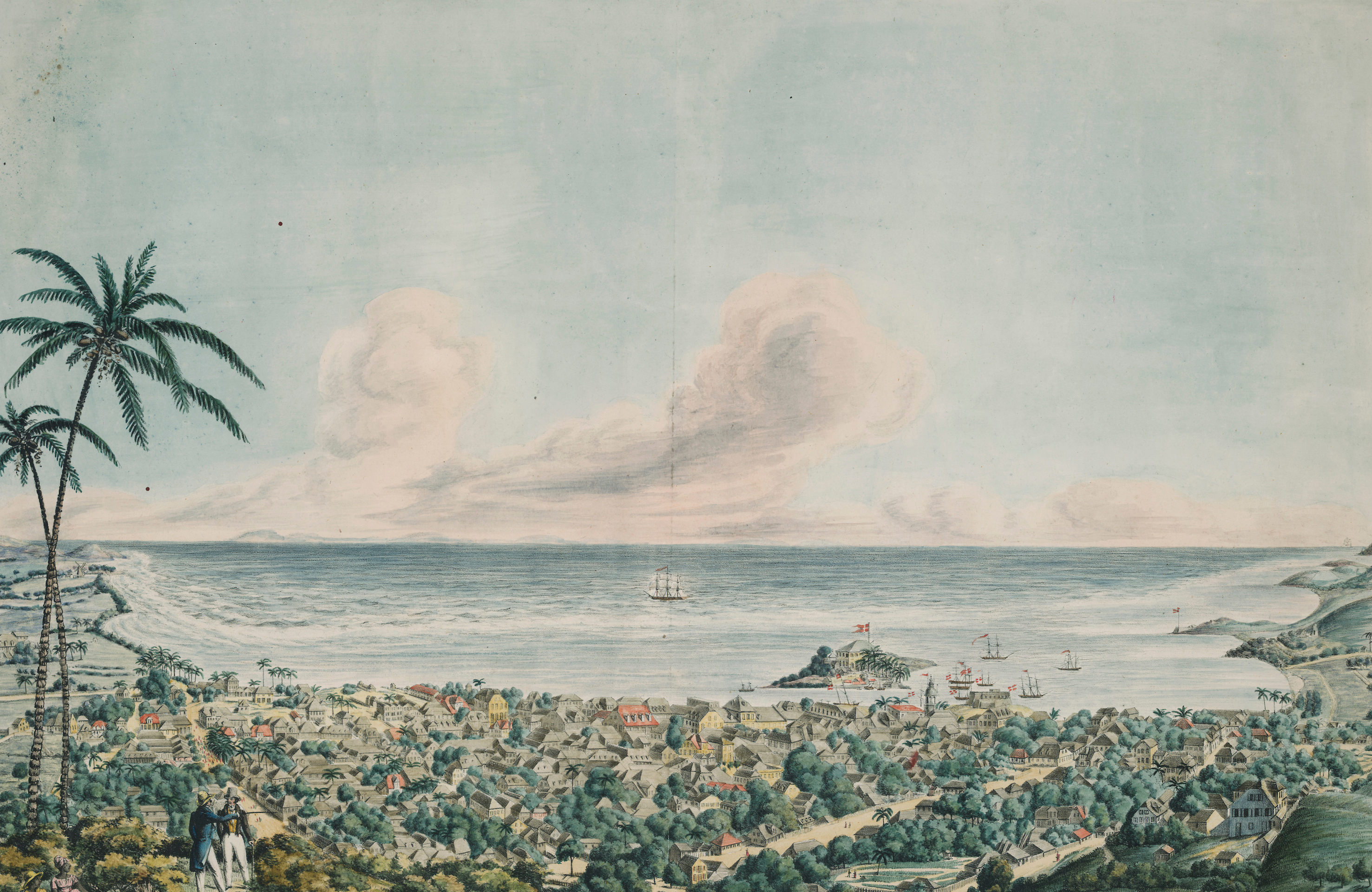
Christiansted in 1831

Christiansted is a former capital of the Danish West Indies and home to the Christiansted National Historic Site. It has preserved the 18th-century Danish-style solid stone buildings in pastel colors with bright red tile roofs line the cobblestone sidewalks, adding a touch of 18th-century European architectural style. Because the town was constructed by African slaves, there are also African influences in Christiansted's design, making it one of the world's few "African-Danish" towns. The town's symmetry, with streets running at right angles to the waterfront, makes it popular for walking tours. The commercial area centers on King and Company streets, adjacent to the Christiansted National Historic Site. The residential area, including portions that were originally settlements for free blacks, extends inland and uphill from the commercial area. The botanist Julius von Rohr started a botanic garden in the 18th century and produced a number of landscapes of the island.

Christiansted has small hotels and many restaurants. In 1947, The Buccaneer resort, to the northeast of town, was opened by the Armstrong family as an 11-room inn. Several scuba shops operate in town, as the wharf has easy access to diving attractions on the island's north side. A small point of interest is Protestant Cay, a cay near Christiansted.

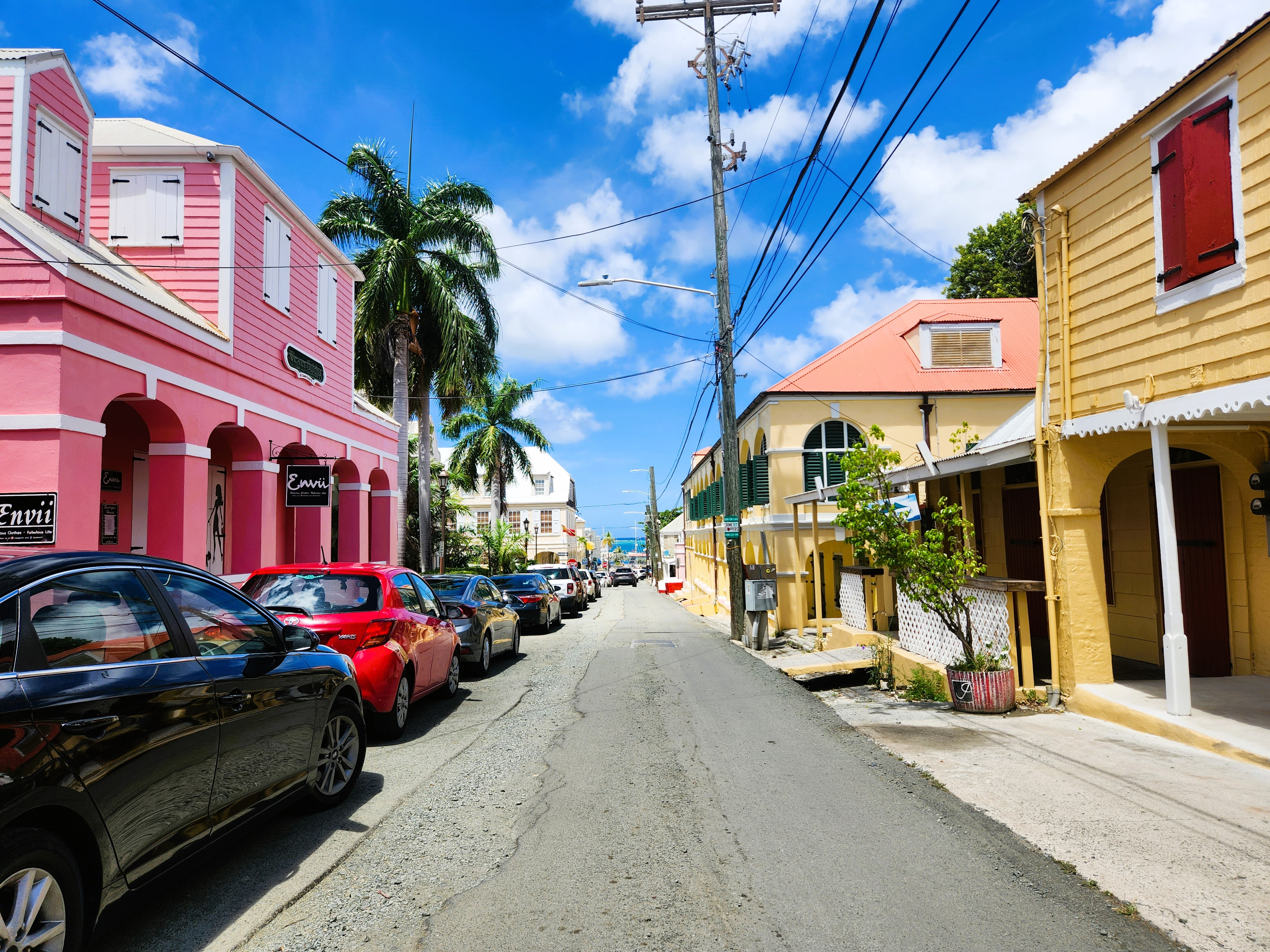
Queens Cross St. in Christiansted

== Demographics ==
=== 2020 Census ===
Christiansted town, U.S. Virgin Islands – Racial and ethnic composition Note: the US Census treats Hispanic/Latino as an ethnic category. This table excludes Latinos from the racial categories and assigns them to a separate category. Hispanics/Latinos may be of any race.
Race / Ethnicity (NH = Non-Hispanic)	Pop 2020	% 2020
White alone (NH)	128	7.23%
Black or African American alone (NH)	997	56.33%
Native American or Alaska Native alone (NH)	13	0.73%
Asian alone (NH)	16	0.90%
Native Hawaiian or Pacific Islander alone (NH)	0	0.00%
Other race alone (NH)	11	0.62%
Mixed race or Multiracial (NH)	25	1.41%
Hispanic or Latino (any race)	580	32.77%
Total	1,770	100.00%

As of 2020, Christiansted had a population of 1,770, while the larger sub-district had a population of 1,866.

The population decreased by almost 30% between 2010 and 2020 due to the impact of Hurricanes Irma and Maria.

Population history of Christiansted subdistrict
Year	Pop.	±%
1990	3,199	—
2000	2,865	−10.4%
2010	2,626	−8.3%
2020	1,866	−28.9%
Source: US Census Bureau

== Economy ==
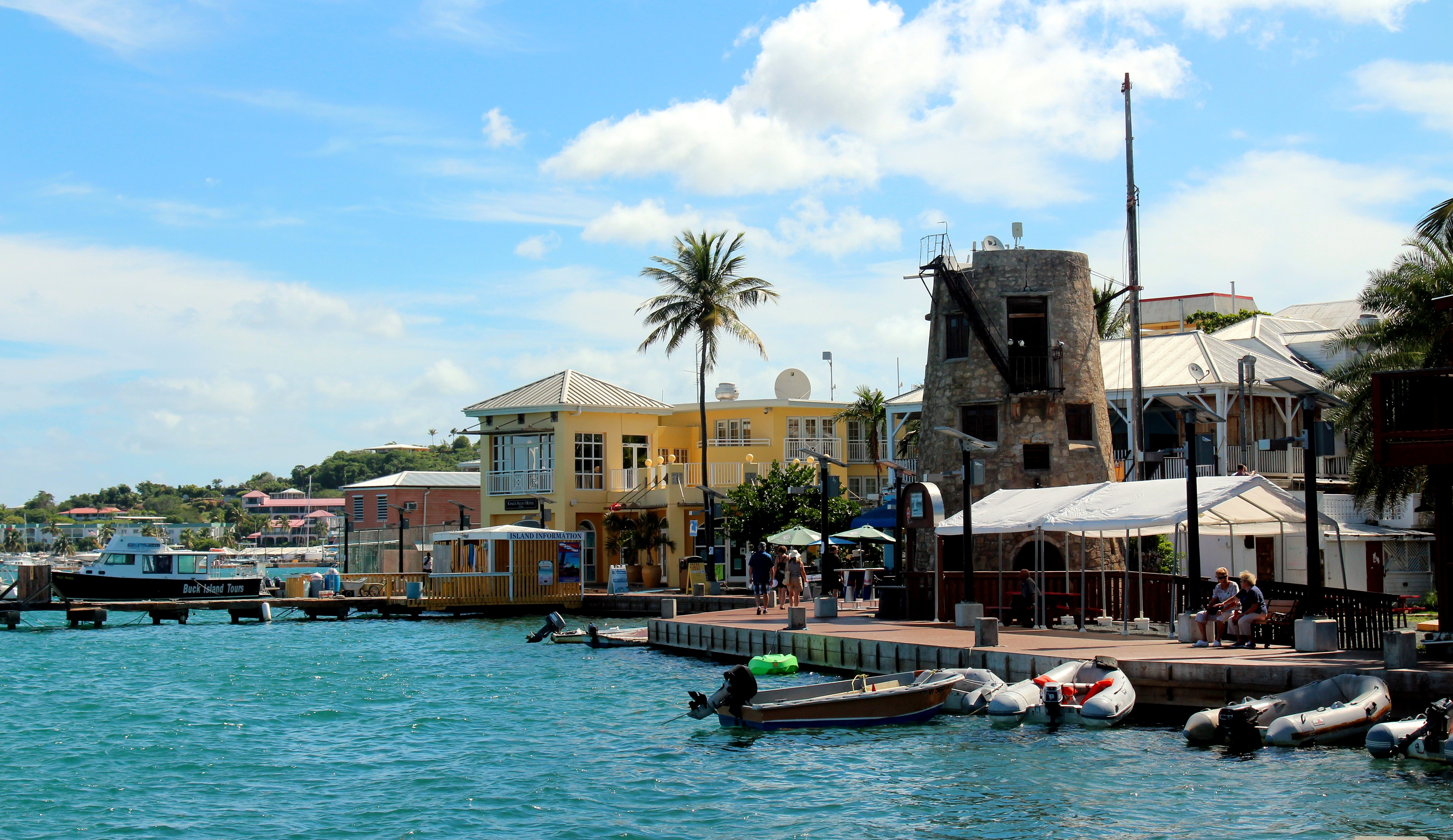
Christiansted

Christiansted, thrives on tourism. It has a boardwalk that includes jewelry stores which make their own original jewelry designs. There are also studios and galleries offering paintings, photography, glass works, arts and crafts made by local artists and unique clothing boutiques.

Seaborne Airlines was formerly headquartered in Christiansted.

== Transportation ==
Christiansted is served by one commercial airport, Henry E. Rohlsen Airport, with flights on several airlines, including American and Delta. A ferry serving the hotel on the Cay resort runs between Christiansted and Protestant Cay.

== Education ==
Public schools serving the community are operated by the St. Croix School District.

== Climate ==
Christiansted has a tropical savanna climate (Koppen Aw/As).

Climate data for Christiansted, U.S. Virgin Islands (Henry E. Rohlsen International Airport) (1991–2020 normals, extremes 1951–present)
Month	Jan	Feb	Mar	Apr	May	Jun	Jul	Aug	Sep	Oct	Nov	Dec	Year
Record high °F (°C)	92 (33)	93 (34)	92 (33)	93 (34)	94 (34)	97 (36)	94 (34)	96 (36)	97 (36)	98 (37)	93 (34)	92 (33)	98 (37)
Mean maximum °F (°C)	86.3 (30.2)	87.0 (30.6)	87.3 (30.7)	88.3 (31.3)	89.1 (31.7)	91.0 (32.8)	91.6 (33.1)	92.0 (33.3)	91.4 (33.0)	90.8 (32.7)	89.3 (31.8)	87.7 (30.9)	92.7 (33.7)
Mean daily maximum °F (°C)	84.2 (29.0)	84.6 (29.2)	85.0 (29.4)	86.0 (30.0)	87.1 (30.6)	88.7 (31.5)	89.2 (31.8)	89.5 (31.9)	89.0 (31.7)	88.4 (31.3)	86.8 (30.4)	85.1 (29.5)	87.0 (30.6)
Daily mean °F (°C)	77.7 (25.4)	78.0 (25.6)	78.2 (25.7)	79.7 (26.5)	81.2 (27.3)	82.8 (28.2)	83.2 (28.4)	83.4 (28.6)	82.8 (28.2)	82.2 (27.9)	80.6 (27.0)	78.8 (26.0)	80.7 (27.1)
Mean daily minimum °F (°C)	71.2 (21.8)	71.4 (21.9)	71.5 (21.9)	73.4 (23.0)	75.4 (24.1)	76.9 (24.9)	77.3 (25.2)	77.4 (25.2)	76.6 (24.8)	76.0 (24.4)	74.4 (23.6)	72.5 (22.5)	74.5 (23.6)
Mean minimum °F (°C)	66.7 (19.3)	66.9 (19.4)	66.9 (19.4)	68.2 (20.1)	70.6 (21.4)	72.4 (22.4)	73.2 (22.9)	73.6 (23.1)	73.1 (22.8)	72.6 (22.6)	69.4 (20.8)	68.3 (20.2)	64.4 (18.0)
Record low °F (°C)	61 (16)	61 (16)	60 (16)	62 (17)	62 (17)	62 (17)	64 (18)	63 (17)	63 (17)	65 (18)	61 (16)	61 (16)	60 (16)
Average precipitation inches (mm)	1.94 (49)	1.35 (34)	1.62 (41)	2.22 (56)	3.62 (92)	1.92 (49)	2.64 (67)	3.23 (82)	4.89 (124)	5.03 (128)	5.30 (135)	3.25 (83)	37.01 (940)
Average precipitation days (≥ 0.01 in)	15.8	12.6	12.0	10.2	11.9	11.3	16.7	15.6	15.7	16.9	16.8	17.2	172.7
Source: NOAA

== People ==
- Judah P. Benjamin, Confederate politician, born in Christiansted while it was still a Danish colony.
- Victor Borge, was a longtime resident of Christiansted
- Carolyn Carter, model and beauty queen
- NBA player Tim Duncan (two-time MVP, five-time NBA champion) is a native.
- Kenneth Gittens, politician and police officer
- Alexander Hamilton, resident in 1765 after leaving his birthplace of Charlestown, Nevis at age 11. Upon reaching 17 years old, he moved from the then-Danish Virgin Islands to New York City and never returned to the Caribbean.
- Casper Holstein, mobster involved in the Harlem "numbers rackets", was born in Christiansted in 1876.
- Marise James, politician
- Audre Lorde, poet, died in Christiansted
- "Queen" Mary Thomas, one of the leaders of the fireburn riots, was imprisoned here from 1887 to 1905.

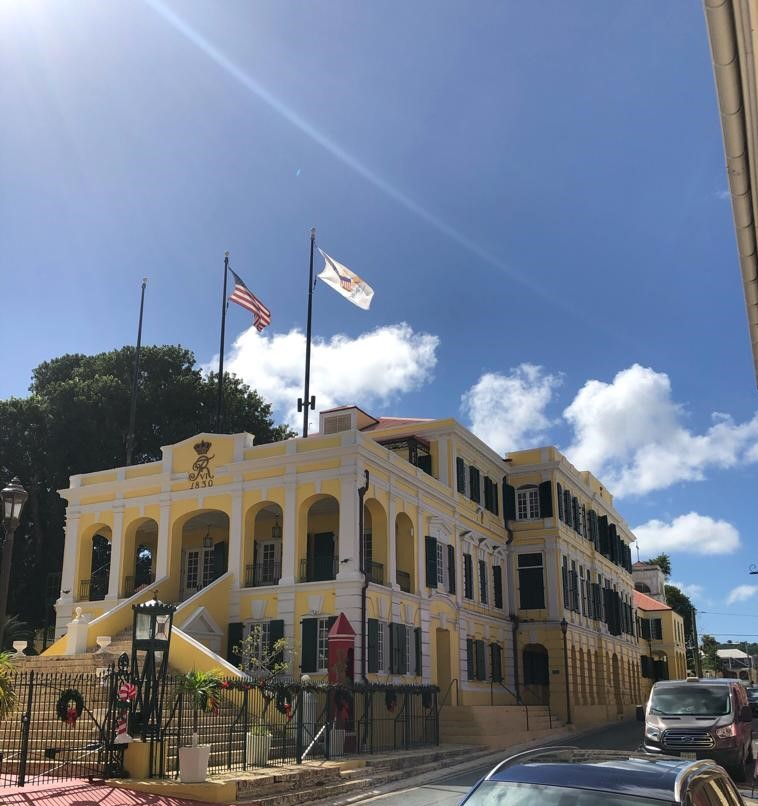
Government House in Christiansted.

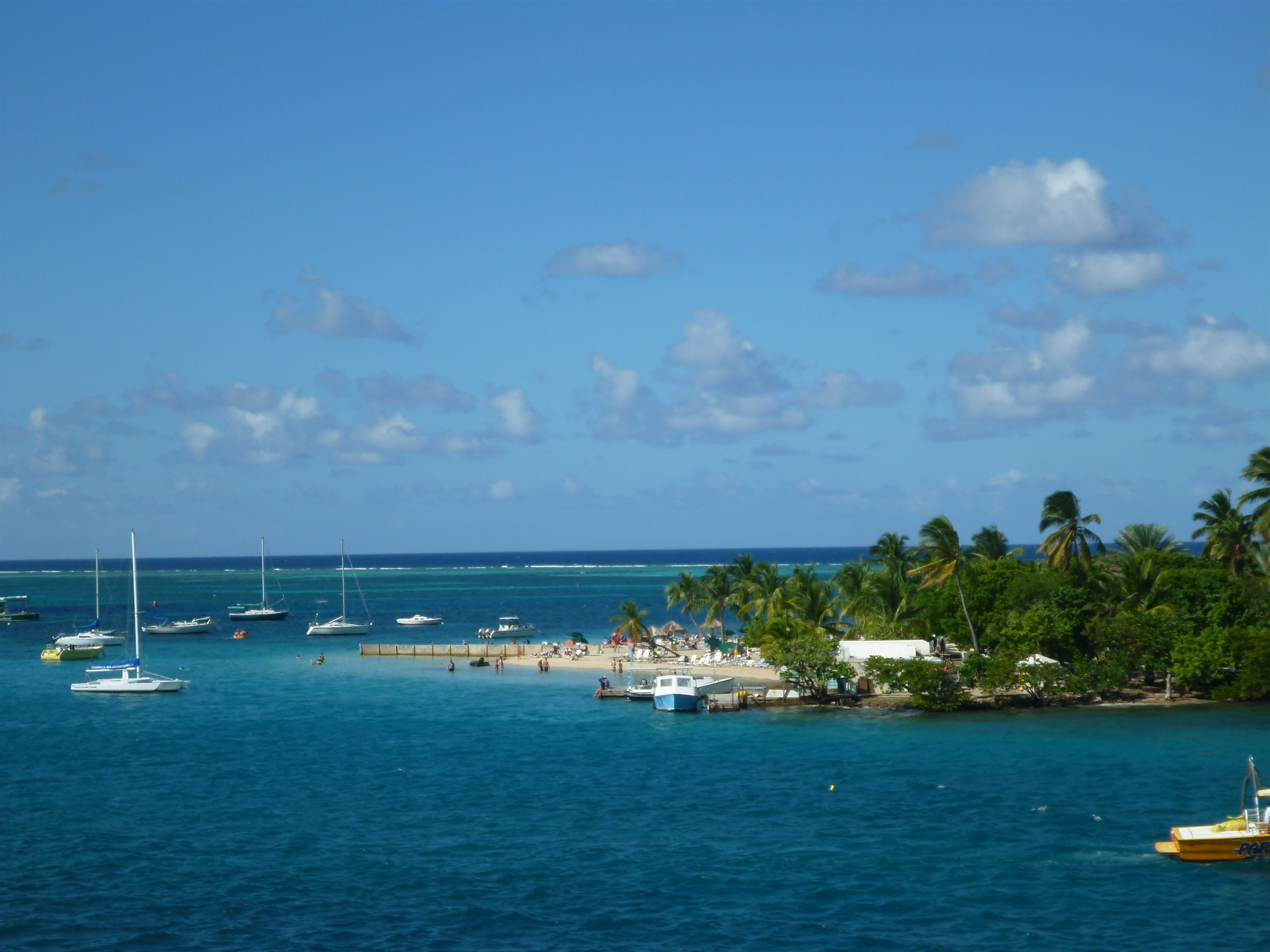
Protestant Cay.

== Sources ==
- Lonely Planet's Cities Book: A Journey Through the Best Cities in the World p. 159.
