= Grass Cay, U.S. Virgin Islands =

Coordinates: 18°21′32″N 64°49′58″W

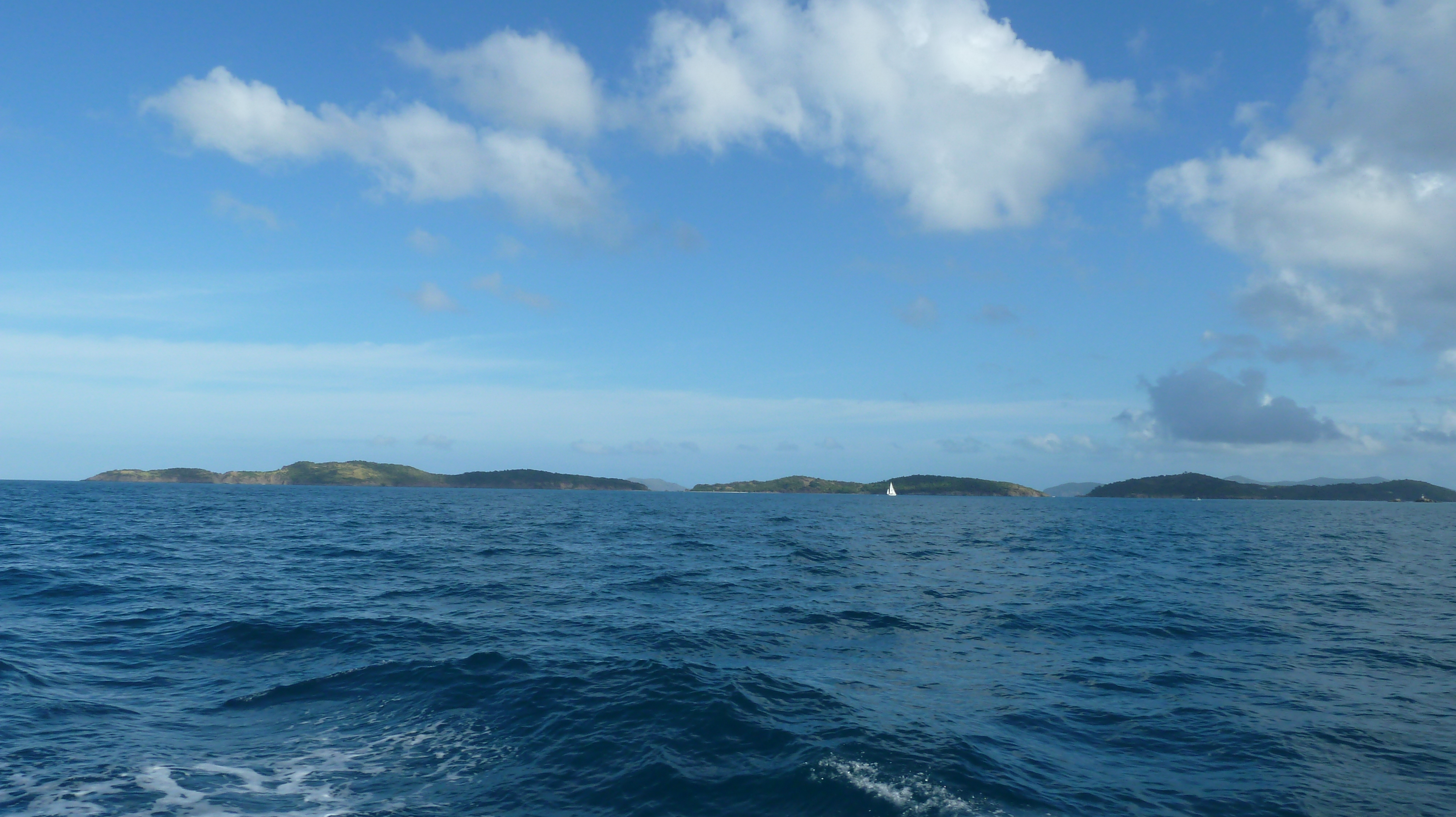
Grass Cay (left), Mingo Cay (middle), and Lovango Cay (right), as seen from a ferry

Grass Cay is an island of the United States Virgin Islands.

It is located between St. Thomas and St. John. It is approximately 1.6 miles (2.6 km) long by 1/8 mile (0.20 km) wide. There is no permanent human habitation.
