= Lovango Cay, U.S. Virgin Islands =

Island in the United States Virgin Islands

Coordinates: 18°21′43″N 64°48′20″W

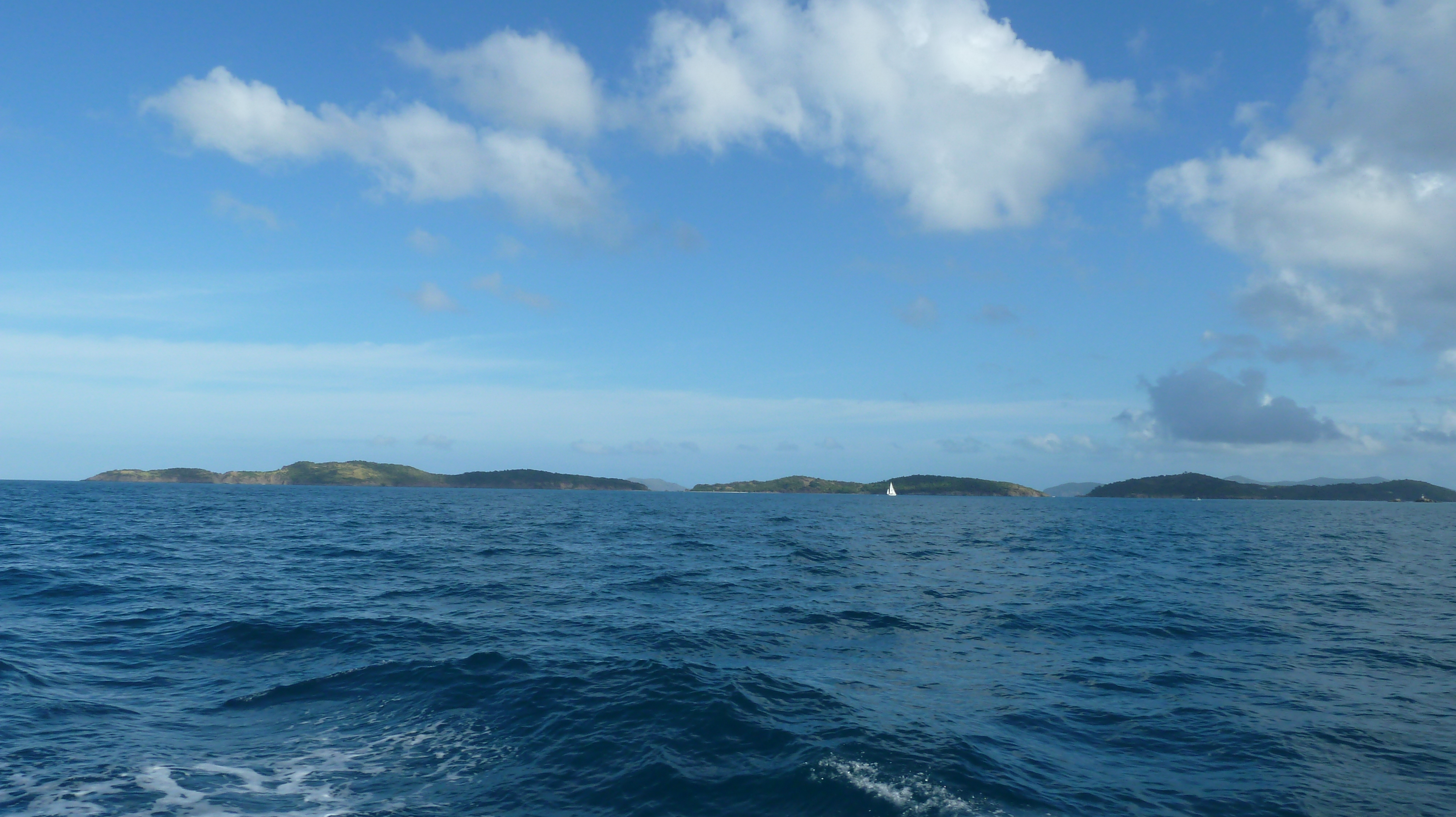
Grass Cay (left), Mingo Cay (middle), and Lovango Cay (right), as seen from a ferry

Lovango Cay is a private island in the district of St. John, in the United States Virgin Islands.

Lying 1 mile (1.6 km) northwest of the island of St. John, Lovango (also known at various times as Loango and Awango) covers an area of 118 acres (48 ha) and rises to 255 feet (78 m) at its highest point.

The island has been sparsely inhabited since at least 1728. The peak recorded population was 49 people in 1917, at which point there was briefly a school.

The island hosts an eco-responsible housing development called Loving Cay Estates. The island is self-sufficient and hosts its own solar array, wind turbine, and reverse-osmosis desalination facility. New island developments include a pool and beach club.

Accessible only by boat, the north side of the cay features a small bay. With Congo Cay to the north, the water here tends to stay calm and offers very good snorkeling. Among other things, nurse sharks are often found resting here during the day.

The south side of the island is a popular snorkeling spot for charter boats from St. John and St. Thomas.

The ashes of J. Robert Oppenheimer are sunk between here, Carval Rock, and Congo Cay.
