= Protestant Cay =

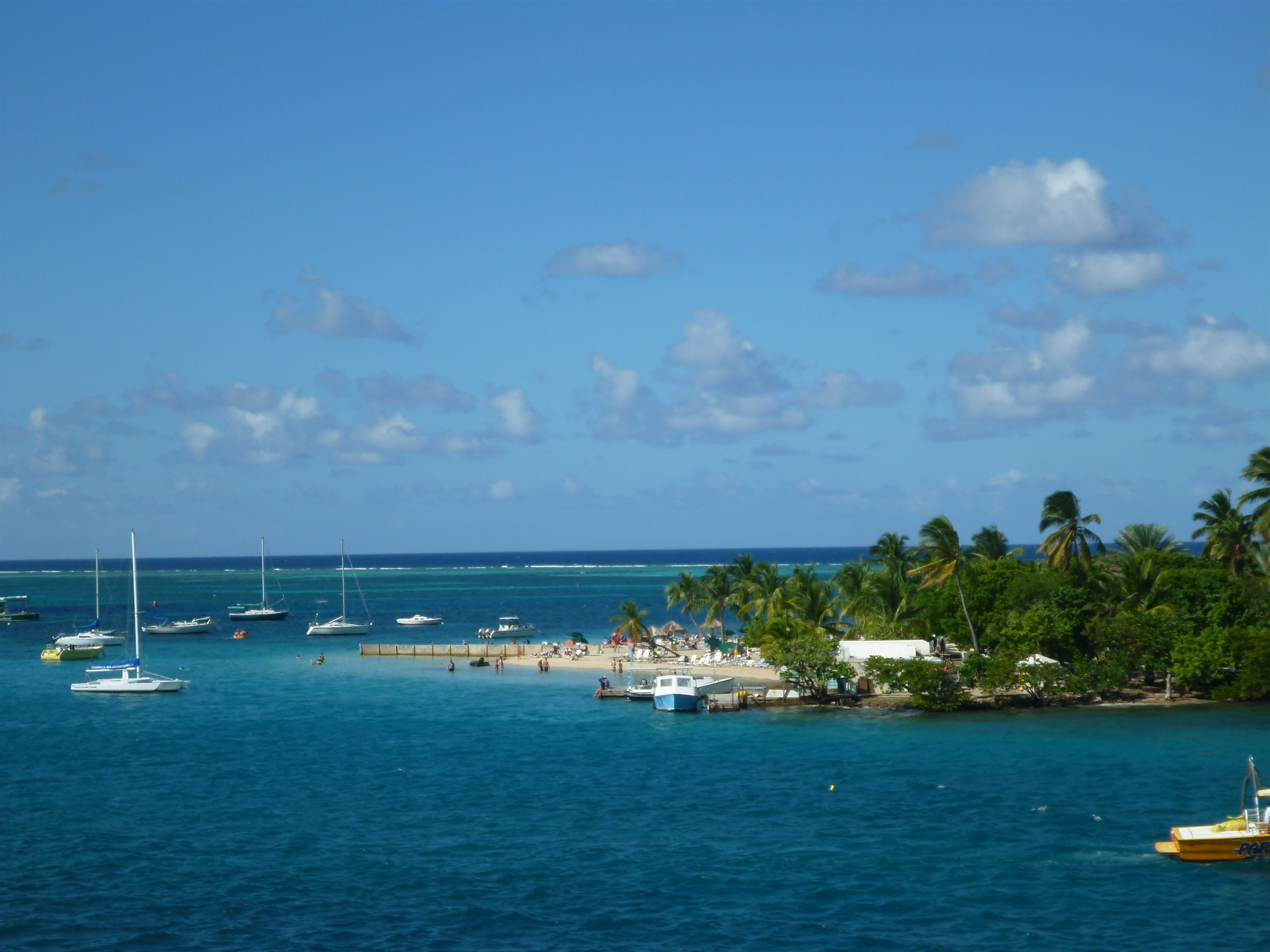

- Location within Saint Croix, U.S. Virgin Islands Location within the U.S. Virgin Islands

Geography
- Location: Christiansted Harbor
- Coordinates: 17°44′59″N 64°42′10″W
- Archipelago: Virgin Islands
- Area: 4 acres (1.6 ha)

Administration
- United States; United States Virgin Islands
- Territory: Virgin Islands
- District: District of Saint Croix
- Sub-district: Christiansted

Protestant Cay is a four-acre triangular islet in the Christiansted Harbor, 200 yards north of Christiansted. The island is home to a resort, the Hotel on the Cay, which is home to a protected sand beach, small shop and beach bar. It also has the closest beach to Downtown Christiansted. With one of the ferries, which run from 7 a.m. to 12 a.m., every ten minutes, it will only take about two minutes to get there. The ride is free of charge after 4 p.m., and for guests of the Hotel on the Cay. To get on the ferry, passengers have to stand near the boardwalk in front of the King Christian Hotel and wave to the boat captain on duty.

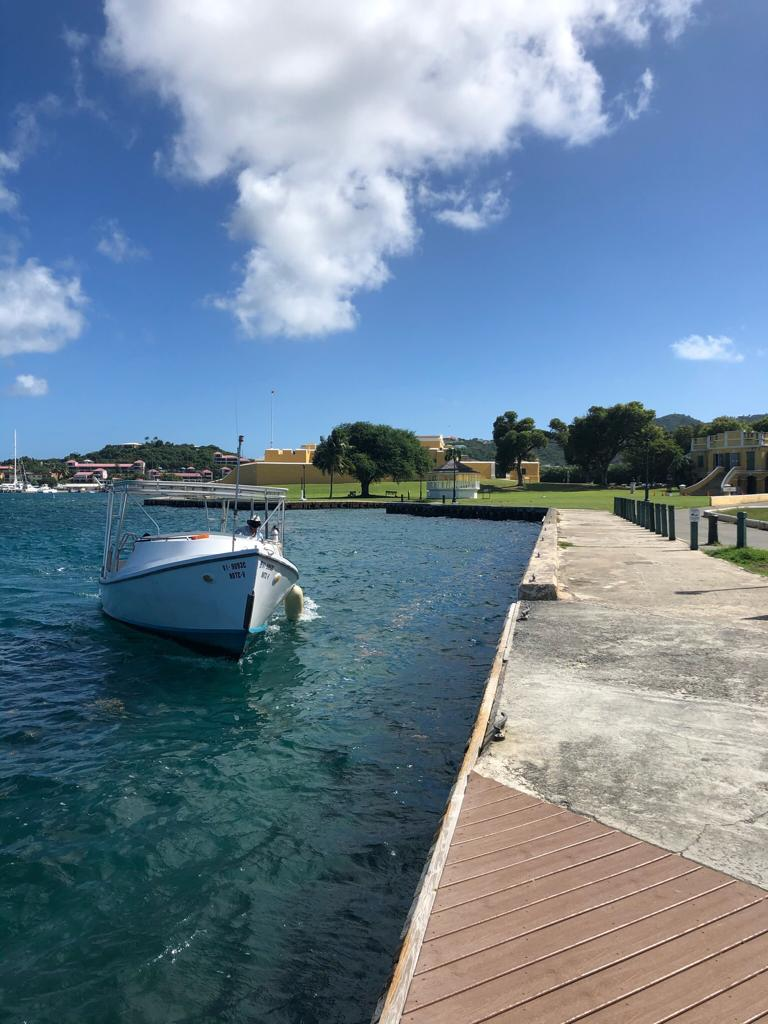
Ferry to Protestant Cay

== History ==
Local legend says the island is named because the Catholic French rulers of the late 1600s wanted all of non-Catholic faith to be segregated and interred on the offshore islet. As only Catholics were allowed burials on Saint Croix, people of other faiths were buried on Protestant Cay.

During the years as a Danish colony, Protestantism became the principal faith of the islands. In the 19th century. Protestant Cay was the residence of the local chief pilot.

== Threatened species ==
The endemic Saint Croix ground lizard once roamed Saint Croix and all nearby islands and islets, but is now only found on Protestant and Green Cays off Saint Croix’s northern coast.
