= Congo Cay =

Uninhabited island of the US Virgin Islands

Coordinates: 18°22′4″N 64°48′10″W

Congo Cay is an uninhabited island of the United States Virgin Islands, located north of Lovango Cay. It is a snorkeling spot for charter boats from Saint Thomas and Saint John. Congo Cay in the US Virgin Islands is owned by the local government. As almost all of the smaller islands, islets, and cays in the USVI, Congo Cay in the US Virgin Islands is a wild life refuge. It is one of the most beautiful non inhabited cays in the Virgin Islands and a nesting habitat for pelicans.

Wildlife Sanctuaries USVI documents Congo Cay as a nesting habitat for pelicans. According to Wild Life Sanctuaries and other Protected Areas in the US Virgin Islands, that with the exception of some tern species, most seabirds nest at the same colony year after year, and rarely form new colonies. This raises the question - is it incredibly important for the islands food chain well being that these places remain undisturbed? Where else can the birds go?

Although boat owners take particular notice to their large droppings, unfortunately, the pelican population does not seem to be extensive. The nearby surrounding islands of Lovango and Carvel Rock along with Congo Cay make for a visual drive through by boat.

The Government of the US Virgin islands has been catching up with sustainable travel and slowly addressing it. One major USVI law prohibits the use of non reef safe sunscreen. Although one of the highest regulatory standards has been set, it is not directly enforced. The ashes of J. Robert Oppenheimer are sunk between here, Carval Rock, and Lovango Cay.
