= Caye Sable =

Densely populated island of Haiti

Native name: Kay Sab
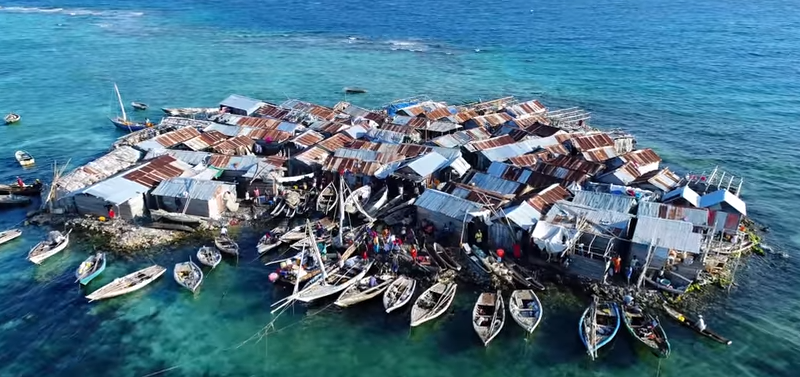

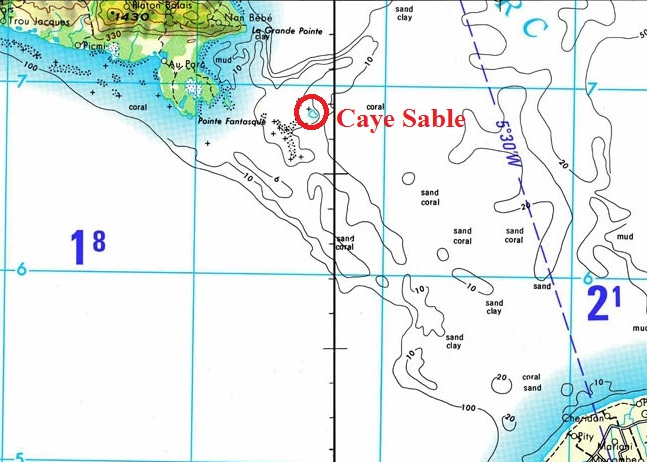

- Location within Haiti

Geography
- Coordinates: 18°41′42″N 72°45′47″W
- Area: 0.16 ha (0.40 acres)

Administration
- Haiti
- Department: Ouest
- Arrondissement: La Gonâve
- Commune: Anse-à-Galets

Demographics
- Population: 250
- Pop. density: 156,250/km^{2} (404690/sq mi)

Caye Sable (Haitian Creole: Kay Sab) is a cay of Haiti located in the Anse-à-Galets commune, about 50 kilometres (31 mi) west of Port-au-Prince. It is known for being the most densely populated island in the world, with around 250–300 people sharing an area of 0.16 hectares (0.40 acres) among about 75 houses, making for a population density of 156,250 people/km^{2} (404,700 people/mi^{2}). It is accessible by small boats from the village of Petite Anse, in the extreme south of Gonâve Island. There is no source of fresh water on the island.

== See also ==
- List of islands of Haiti
- Ilet a Brouee
- Santa Cruz del Islote
