= Nagarao Island =

Island in the Philippines

Isla sa Nagarao
- Location within Visayas

Geography
- Coordinates: 11°49′6″N 123°50′42″E
- Archipelago: Philippine
- Adjacent to: Visayan Sea
- Area: 0.03 km^{2} (0.012 sq mi)

Administration
- Philippines
- Region: Bicol
- Province: Masbate
- Municipality: Placer
- Barangay: Nagarao

Demographics
- Population: 833 (2020)
- Pop. density: 27,766/km^{2} (71914/sq mi)
- Ethnic groups: Cebuano; Masbateño

Nagarao is an island situated in the Visayan Sea, a major fishing ground in the Philippines. The island is 8 km (5.0 mi) southwest from Placer, Masbate. With an area of only around 0.03 km^{2} (0.012 sq mi), the population of the island is 833. Most of the families in Nagarao Island depend on fishing.

The island is becoming a developing tourist destination, since Nagarao Island is surrounded by white sand beaches and has three sandbars. There are no regular or scheduled boat trips to Nagarao, however, chartered motorized bangka are always docked in Barangay Pasiagon, Placer for people to travel to Nagarao Island.

The whole island is administered by the local government of Barangay Nagarao, under the jurisdiction of the municipality of Placer, Masbate. Nagarao Island with its neighboring islands, Guin-awayan and Naboctot, are declared ecotourism zones through House Bill 8726.

Nagarao has one public school, Nagarao Elementary School.

== See also ==
• List of islands by population density
