= List of islands by population density =

The following is a list of islands, sorted by population density, and including islands that are connected to other land masses by a route other than sea or air, such as a bridge or a tunnel.

== Continental landmasses ==
Continental landmasses are not usually classified as islands despite being completely surrounded by water. Nevertheless, for the purposes of this list, mainland Australia along with the other major landmasses have been listed as continental landmasses for comparison. The figures are approximations and are for the four major continental landmasses only. (Note: Physiographically, there are only four continents (including offshore continental islands which sit on the nearby continental shelves) that are completely surrounded by water: Afro-Eurasia (57% of the global land area), the Americas (28.5%), Antarctica (9%), and Australia (5%). The remaining 0.5% is made up of remote oceanic islands, mostly scattered within Oceania in the central and south Pacific Ocean.)

Rank	Continental landmass (Note: Including landmasses which are above water and over 2,500,000 km^{2} (970,000 sq mi). The submerged continent of Zealandia (approx. 5,000,000 km^{2} (1,900,000 sq mi)) is excluded.)	Area		Population	Population density	
Rank	Continental landmass	km^{2}	sq mi	Population	per km^{2}	per sq mi
1	Afro-Eurasia	79,810,726	30,815,094 (Note: Figure derived from the Global Islands Explorer website, by adding the areas of mainland Africa (29,370,907 km^{2} (11,340,171 sq mi)) and mainland Eurasia (50,439,819 km^{2} (19,474,923 sq mi)).)	6,729,986,135 (2019)	78.5	203
2	Americas	37,699,623	14,555,906 (Note: Figure derived from the Global Islands Explorer website, by adding the areas of mainland North America (20,090,075 km^{2} (7,756,821 sq mi)) and mainland South America (17,609,548 km^{2} (6,799,084 sq mi)).)	1,027,067,740	22.67	58.7
3	Australia (Note: Mainland Australia is more than three times the size of Greenland, the largest island. Australia is sometimes dubbed "The Island Continent" or "Earth's largest island, but its smallest continent".)	7,591,608	2,931,136 (Note: Figure derived from the Geoscience Australia website, the area of mainland Tasmania (64,519 km^{2} (24,911 sq mi)) has been deducted. The Global Islands Explorer website has given a slightly larger figure of 7,618,696 km^{2} (2,941,595 sq mi) for the area of mainland Australia.)	25,887,383	3.41	8.8
4	Antarctica	12,272,800	4,738,600 (Note: Area of mainland Antarctica, without the ice shelves and nearby islands.)	1,300 to 5,100 (seasonal)	0.00009 to 0.00036	0.00023 to 0.00093 (seasonal)

== Most densely populated islands (over 1,000 people per km^{2}) ==
Accurate density estimates for the very small islands (less than 1 square kilometre or 0.39 square miles) are hard to obtain because population as well as landmass are often only estimates. Additionally, the populations of these islands are often highly transient, with many residents also maintaining a residence on a larger landmass and only living on the island seasonally.

Island	Country or territory	Surrounded by	Population	Area		Density		Coordinates
Island	Country or territory	Surrounded by	Population	km^{2}	sq mi	per km^{2}	per sq mi	Coordinates
Caye Sable	Haiti	Gulf of Gonâve	250	0.0016	0.00062	156,250	404,700	18°41′42″N 72°45′47″W
Îlet-à-Brouée	Haiti	Caribbean Sea	500	0.004	0.0015	125,000	320,000	18°07′42″N 73°35′26″W
Terong Island (Batam)	Indonesia	South China Sea	3,000	0.04	0.015	75,000	190,000	0°56′49″N 103°45′55″E
Panggang Island (Kepulauan Seribu)	Indonesia	Java Sea	6,440 (2022 estimate)	0.09	0.035	71,555	185,330	5°44′19″S 106°36′01″E
Pajenekang Island	Indonesia	Makassar Strait	2,700	0.04	0.015	67,500	175,000	4°58′09″S 119°19′40″E
Malé	Maldives	Indian Ocean	137,238	2.055	0.793	66,782	172,960	4°10′30″N 73°30′32″E
Migingo Island	Kenya	Lake Victoria	131 (2009)	0.002	0.00077	65,500	170,000	0°52′59″S 33°56′20″E
Caubian Gamay (Lapu-Lapu City)	Philippines	Camotes Sea	2,429	0.04	0.015	60,725	157,280	10°16′38″N 124°10′10″E
Ap Lei Chau	Hong Kong	Aberdeen Channel, East Lamma Channel	79,586	1.32	0.51	60,496	156,680	22°14′30″N 114°9′20″E
Navotas Island	Philippines	Manila Bay, Tullahan River	117,196	1.95	0.75	60,100	156,000	14°39′49″N 120°56′35″E
Ile de Fadiouth (Joal-Fadiouth)	Senegal	Atlantic Ocean	9,000	0.15	0.058	60,000	160,000	14°9′9″N 16°49′24″W
Manubul	Philippines	Celebes Sea	7,644	0.13	0.050	58,800	152,000	5°28′18″N 120°47′58″E
Binuangan	Philippines	Manila Bay	5,045	0.09	0.035	56,055	145,180	14°42′59″N 120°54′23″E
Dawahon	Philippines	Canigao Channel	3,230	0.06	0.023	53,833	139,430	10°15′51″N 124°37′01″E
Nasingin	Philippines	Camotes Sea	2,115	0.04	0.015	52,875	136,950	10°10′49″N 124°8′7″E
Sitangkai Island	Philippines	Celebes Sea	15,255	0.3	0.12	50,850	131,700	4°39′43″N 119°23′34″E
Bonacca Cay	Honduras	Caribbean Sea	3,000	0.06	0.023	50,000	130,000	16°26′30″N 85°53′14″W
Nocnocan	Philippines	Camotes Sea	1,785	0.04	0.015	44,625	115,580	10°14′45″N 124°24′14″E
Baba (Karachi)	Pakistan	Karachi Harbour	6,600	0.15	0.058	44,000	110,000	24°49′26″N 66°57′38″E
Flores Island	Guatemala	Lake Peten Itza	13,000	0.3	0.12	43,333	112,230	16°55′49″N 89°53′28″W
Ebeye	Marshall Islands	Pacific Ocean	15,000	0.36	0.14	41,666	107,910	8°46′49″N 167°44′14″E
Bungin Island	Indonesia	Bali Sea	3,500	0.085	0.033	41,176	106,650	8°28′38″S 116°59′42″E
Pugad	Philippines	Manila Bay	1,636	0.04	0.015	40,900	106,000	14°46′03″N 120°44′31″E
Santa Cruz del Islote	Colombia	Caribbean Sea	485	0.012	0.0046	40,417	104,680	9°47′9″N 75°51′33″W
Sanane Island	Indonesia	Makassar Strait	2,000 (2022 estimate)	0.05	0.019	40,000	100,000	4°56′46″S 119°20′29″E
Bilangbilangan	Philippines	Cebu Strait	471	0.012	0.0046	39,250	101,700	9°59′15″N 123°52′56″E
Lamputang Island	Indonesia	Makassar Strait	750 (approx.)	0.02	0.0077	37,500	97,000	4°50′45″S 119°20′35″E
Badi Island	Indonesia	Makassar Strait	2,906 (2007)	0.08	0.031	36,325	94,080	4°58′03″S 119°17′14″E
Mormaquetupu	Panama	Caribbean Sea	433	0.012	0.0046	36,083	93,450	9°27′12″N 78°51′12″W
Bhit (Karachi)	Pakistan	Karachi Harbour	5,400	0.16	0.062	33,750	87,400	24°49′3″N 66°57′49″E
Pandanon	Philippines	Camotes Sea	2,362	0.07	0.027	33,743	87,390	10°10′48″N 124°5′6″E
Mocaboc	Philippines	Cebu Strait	670	0.02	0.0077	33,500	87,000	10°4′16″N 123°55′40″E
Mandinga Ubigantupu	Panama	Caribbean Sea	361	0.011	0.0042	32,818	85,000	9°30′20″N 79°02′23″W
Cuaming	Philippines	Cebu Strait	3,263	0.10	0.039	32,632	84,520	10°6′45″N 123°59′13″E
Narvagandub Bibbi	Panama	Caribbean Sea	418	0.013	0.0050	32,153	83,280	9°27′30″N 79°1′17″W
Ukupseni	Panama	Caribbean Sea	1,849	0.06	0.023	30,817	79,820	9°18′42″N 78°13′54″W
Pulau Lae-Lae	Indonesia	Makassar Strait	2,000	0.065	0.025	30,769	79,690	5°08′14″S 119°23′31″E
Pala Island	Indonesia	Makassar Strait	600 (approx.)	0.02	0.0077	30,000	78,000	4°48′07″S 119°19′54″E
Mirya Ubgigandub	Panama	Caribbean Sea	896	0.03	0.012	29,867	77,360	9°26′47″N 78°54′00″W
Neft Daşları	Azerbaijan	Caspian Sea	2,000 (2008)	0.07	0.027	28,571	74,000	
Rio Sidra	Panama	Caribbean Sea	856	0.03	0.012	28,533	73,900	9°27′7″N 78°49′57″W
Manhattan (New York City)	United States	Hudson River, East River, Harlem River, New York Harbor	1,694,251	59.47	22.96	28,497	73,810	40°43′40″N 73°59′40″W
Pulau Barrang Lompo	Indonesia	Makassar Strait	5,547 (2018)	0.195	0.075	28,446	73,670	5°02′55″S 119°19′44″E
Pangapasan	Philippines	Cebu Strait	567	0.02	0.0077	28,350	73,400	9°59′52″N 123°56′26″E
Mombasa Island	Kenya	Indian Ocean, Tudor Creek, Kilindini Harbour	147,983	5.3	2.0	27,921	72,320	4°3′18″S 39°39′48″E
Nagarao	Philippines	Visayan Sea	833	0.03	0.012	27,766	71,910	11°49′6″N 123°50′42″E
Bontosua Island	Indonesia	Makassar Strait	1,109	0.04	0.015	27,725	71,810	4°55′40″S 119°19′14″E
Lagos Island	Nigeria	Lagos Lagoon	212,700 (2006)	9.26	3.58	26,955	69,810	6°27′12″N 3°24′27″E
Naranjos Grandes	Panama	Caribbean Sea	528	0.02	0.0077	26,400	68,000	9°27′40″N 79°01′34″W
Harapan Island (Kepulauan Seribu)	Indonesia	Java Sea	2,580 (2022 estimate)	0.1	0.039	25,800	67,000	5°39′12″S 106°34′41″E
Carti Mulatupu	Panama	Caribbean Sea	502	0.02	0.0077	25,100	65,000	9°28′04″N 78°56′57″W
Sarappo Lompo Island	Indonesia	Makassar Strait	2,500	0.1	0.039	25,000	65,000	4°52′52″S 119°15′59″E
Arwad	Syria	Mediterranean Sea	5,000	0.2	0.077	25,000	65,000	34°51′22″N 35°51′32″E
Calituban	Philippines	Camotes Sea	3,738	0.15	0.058	24,920	64,500	10°14′36″N 124°17′43″E
Salsette Island (Mumbai)	India	Ulhas River, Vasai Creek, Thane Creek, Arabian Sea	15,111,974	619	239	24,414	63,230	19°12′N 72°54′E
Pulau Barrang Caddi	Indonesia	Makassar Strait	1,263	0.052	0.020	24,288	62,910	5°04′52″S 119°19′13″E
Tiga Island	Indonesia	Banda Sea	900 (estimate)	0.038	0.015	23,684	61,340	3°21′45″S 122°35′31″E
Nedungad (Kochi)	India		20,000|	0.85	0.33 (est.)	23,529	60,940	
Bagongbanwa	Philippines	Cebu Strait	1,172	0.05	0.019	23,440	60,700	10°3′18″N 123°53′57″E
Mambacayao Gamay	Philippines	Tañon Strait; Visayan Sea	1,400	0.06	0.023	23,333	60,430	11°2′0″N 123°35′23″E
Cartí Sugtupu	Panama	Caribbean Sea	927	0.04	0.015	23,175	60,020	9°28′13″N 78°57′39″W
Arritupu	Panama	Caribbean Sea	332	0.015	0.0058	22,133	57,320	9°30′04″N 79°01′35″W
Podangpodang Lompo Island	Indonesia	Makassar Strait	880	0.04	0.015	22,000	57,000	4°53′12″S 119°20′24″E
Masadian Island	Indonesia	Flores Sea	1,318	0.06	0.023	21,967	56,890	3°23′22″S 122°36′47″E
Cartí Tupile	Panama	Caribbean Sea	439	0.02	0.0077	21,950	56,900	9°28′35″N 78°57′38″W
Île Saint-Louis (Paris)	France	Seine River	2,323	0.11	0.042	21,118	54,700	48°51′6″N 2°21′23″E
Lilla Essingen (Stockholm)	Sweden	Mälaren	4,831	0.23	0.089	21,004	54,400	59°19′30″N 18°0′15″E
Villingili (Malé)	Maldives	Indian Ocean	6,755	0.325	0.125	20,772	53,800	4°10′25″N 73°29′5″E
Haizhu (Guangzhou)	China	Pearl River	1,528,812 (2010)	75.4	29.1	20,276	52,510	
Ubay Island	Philippines	Cebu Strait	223	0.011	0.0042	20,272	52,500	10°1′29″N 123°58′0″E
Samaringa Island	Indonesia	Banda Sea	1,000 (estimate)	0.05	0.019	20,000	52,000	3°23′15″S 122°49′01″E
Victory Island	Philippines	Leyte Gulf	598	0.03	0.012	19,933	51,630	11°2′47″N 125°37′4″E
Roosevelt Island (New York City)	United States	East River	11,661 (2010)	0.6	0.23	19,580	50,700	
Nusatupu	Panama	Caribbean Sea	388	0.02	0.0077	19,400	50,000	9°26′50″N 78°49′49″W
Corazón de Jesús	Panama	Caribbean Sea	574	0.03	0.012	19,133	49,550	9°26′47″N 78°34′59″W
Tsing Yi	Hong Kong	Rambler Channel, Ma Wan Channel, Victoria Harbour	200,400 (2007)	10.69	4.13	18,746	48,550	22°20′44″N 114°6′0″E
Vasilyevsky Island (Saint Petersburg)	Russia	Gulf of Finland; Neva River	202,650	10.9	4.2	18,592	48,150	
Mulatupo	Panama	Caribbean Sea	1,452 (2008)	0.09	0.035	18,377	47,600	8°56′46″N 77°45′3″W
Djarrit	Marshall Islands	Pacific Ocean	7,103	0.389	0.150	18,260	47,300	
Wichub Huala	Panama	Caribbean Sea	365	0.02	0.0077	18,250	47,300	9°33′10″N 78°57′07″W
Île de la Jatte (Grand Paris)	France	Seine River	1,817	0.10	0.039	17,761	46,000	48°53′43″N 2°16′1″E
Corbiski	Panama	Caribbean Sea	266	0.015	0.0058	17,733	45,930	9°32′53″N 78°57′50″W
Ailigandí	Panama	Caribbean Sea	1,408	0.08	0.031	17,600	46,000	9°13′42″N 78°1′40″W
Tubualá	Panama	Caribbean Sea	877	0.05	0.019	17,540	45,400	8°55′15″N 77°43′26″W
Södermalm (Stockholm)	Sweden	Mälaren, Baltic Sea	99,685	5.71	2.20	17,458	45,220	
San Ignacio de Tupile	Panama	Caribbean Sea	1,192	0.07	0.027	17,028	44,100	9°17′42″N 78°9′16″W
Bungintende Island	Indonesia	Banda Sea	681	0.04	0.015	17,025	44,090	3°08′44″S 122°35′32″E
Mandangin Island	Indonesia	Flores Sea	21,534	1.28	0.49	16,823	43,570	7°18′39″S 113°12′51″E
Laminusa	Philippines	Celebes Sea	12,830	0.78	0.30	16,449	42,600	5°33′3″N 120°55′12″E
Mantatao	Philippines	Cebu Strait	972	0.06	0.023	16,200	42,000	9°56′34″N 123°51′17″E
South Mangsee	Philippines	Balabac Strait	7,719	0.48	0.19	16,081	41,650	7°30′35″N 117°18′44″E
Hong Kong Island	Hong Kong	Victoria Harbour, South China Sea	1,289,500	80.4	31.0	16,038	41,540	
Sisak Island (Sisak)	Croatia	Kupa	15,897	1.1	0.42	15,897	41,170	
Hulhumalé	Maldives	Indian Ocean	65,714	4.1358	1.5968	15,889	41,150	
Achutupo	Panama	Caribbean Sea	1,586	0.10	0.039	15,860	41,100	9°11′56″N 77°59′12″W
Narganá	Panama	Caribbean Sea	1,215	0.08	0.031	15,187	39,330	9°26′40″N 78°35′8″W
Naboctot	Philippines	Visayan Sea	1,358	0.09	0.035	15,088	39,080	11°51′27″N 123°46′6″E
Río Azúcar	Panama	Caribbean Sea	444	0.03	0.012	14,800	38,000	9°25′52″N 78°37′34″W
Reimersholme (Stockholm)	Sweden	Mälaren	2,324 (2006)	0.16	0.062	14,525	37,620	
Kungsholmen (Stockholm)	Sweden	Mälaren	56,754 (2007)|	3.91	1.51	14,515	37,590	
Coetupo	Panama	Caribbean Sea	856	0.06	0.023	14,266	36,950	8°54′13″N 77°41′45″W
Malingin	Philippines	Camotes Sea	1,567	0.11	0.042	14,245	36,890	10°9′37″N 124°26′31″E
Nalunega	Panama	Caribbean Sea	421	0.03	0.012	14,033	36,350	9°33′2″N 78°57′19″W
Pulau Buluh (Batam)	Indonesia	South China Sea	2,509	0.18	0.069	14,000	36,000	1°1′1″N 103°55′40″E
Caohagan (Lapu-Lapu City)	Philippines	Cebu Strait	694	0.05	0.019	13,880	35,900	10°12′10″N 124°1′11″E
Noordereiland (Rotterdam)	Netherlands	Rhine–Meuse–Scheldt delta	3,295	0.067	0.026	13,513	35,000	
São Vicente Island (Santos)	Brazil		760,000 (approx.)	57.4	22.2	13,240	34,300	
Guindacpan	Philippines	Camotes Sea	2,215	0.17	0.066	13,029	33,740	10°13′36″N 124°16′57″E
Tikantiqui	Panama	Caribbean Sea	772	0.06	0.023	12,866	33,320	9°25′22″N 78°28′52″W
Mamitupo	Panama	Caribbean Sea	1,020	0.08	0.031	12,750	33,000	9°11′25″N 77°58′25″W
Gilutongan	Philippines	Cebu Strait	1,606	0.13	0.050	12,354	32,000	10°12′13″N 123°59′19″E
Mandangin Island	Indonesia	Java Sea	16,000	1.3	0.50	12,307	31,870	7°18′39″S 113°12′50″E
Hinnavaru	Maldives	Indian Ocean	2,449	0.2	0.077	12,245	31,710	5°29′32″N 73°24′44″E
Betio	Kiribati	Pacific Ocean	18,429	1.51	0.58	12,204	31,610	1°21′23″N 172°55′57″E
Burano (Venice)	Italy	Venetian Lagoon	2,658	0.22	0.085	12,082	31,290	45°29′8″N 12°25′3″E
Lübeck Old Town	Germany	Trave river	12,000 (approx.)	1.00	0.39	12,000	31,000	
Peña Island	Philippines	Visayan Sea	2,728	0.23	0.089	11,860	30,700	12°1′12″N 123°38′8″E
Ma Wan	Hong Kong	Ma Wan Channel, Kap Shui Mun	11,193 (2007)	0.96	0.37	11,659	30,200	
Ilha de Moçambique	Mozambique	Indian Ocean	17,356	1.5	0.58	11,570	30,000	15°2′18″S 40°44′1″E
Hambongan	Philippines	Cebu Strait	685	0.06	0.023	11,417	29,570	10°4′14″N 124°1′23″E
Mahibadhoo	Maldives	Indian Ocean	2,580	0.2339	0.0903	11,030	28,600	3°45′26″N 72°58′8″E
Cataban	Philippines	Camotes Sea	1,427	0.13	0.050	10,977	28,430	10°14′0″N 124°22′35″E
Maafushi	Maldives	Indian Ocean	4,471	0.4112	0.1588	10,873	28,160	
Xiamen Island	China	Taiwan Strait	1,410,000 (est)	132.5	51.2	10,650	27,600	
Sagasa	Philippines	Camotes Sea	1,486	0.14	0.054	10,486	27,160	10°12′12″N 124°24′56″E
Hingotanan Island	Philippines	Camotes Sea	3,654	0.36	0.14	10,150	26,300	10°14′21″N 124°29′8″E
Gili Ketapang	Indonesia	Java Sea	7,600	0.75	0.29	10,133	26,240	7°40′44″S 113°15′12″E
Anping Island	Taiwan		60,000 (est)	6	2.3 (est)	10,000	26,000	
Yeongdo (Busan)	South Korea	Sea of Japan	139,765 (2012.12)	14	5.4	9,983	25,860	
Isla Tigre	Panama	Caribbean Sea	817	0.08	0.031	9,800	25,000	9°25′55″N 78°31′17″W
Nantai Island (Fuzhou)	China	Min River	1,142,991 (2020)	118	46	9,686	25,090	
Ustupo	Panama	Caribbean Sea	3,742	0.39	0.15	9,594	24,850	9°7′50″N 77°55′35″W
Cheung Chau	Hong Kong	Adamasta Channel, West Lamma Channel	23,156 (2007)	2.46	0.95	9,413	24,380	
Venice	Italy	Venetian Lagoon	51,298	5.74	2.22	8,937	23,150	45°26′13″N 12°20′9″E
Île de Nantes (Nantes)	France	Loire River	40,128	4.6	1.8	8,723	22,590	47°12′15″N 1°32′50″W
Batasan	Philippines	Cebu Strait	871	0.10	0.039	8,710	22,600	
Naifaru	Maldives	Indian Ocean	4,832	0.5739	0.2216	8,419	21,810	
Stadsholmen (Stockholm)	Sweden	Mälaren	3,000 (approx.) (2006)	0.36	0.14	8,300	21,000	
Portsea Island (Portsmouth)	United Kingdom	English Channel	199,566	24.5	9.5	8,146	21,100	
Mactan	Philippines	Mactan Channel	527,071	65	25	8,109	21,000	10°17′17″N 123°58′56″E
Gulangyu (Xiamen)	China	Taiwan Strait	15,373	1.91	0.74	8,049	20,850	
Giudecca (Venice)	Italy	Venetian Lagoon	6,147	0.80	0.31	7,683	19,900	45°25′31″N 12°19′32″E
Singapore Island	Singapore	Singapore Strait	5,469,700 (2014)	710.2	274.2	7,618	19,730	
Vypin Island (Kochi)	India	Vembanad Lake, Arabian Sea	198,400	27	10	7,348	19,030	10°07′N 76°12′E
Bongao Island	Philippines	Celebes Sea; Sulu Sea	75,076	10.44	4.03	7,191	18,620	5°1′14″N 119°45′12″E
Bairiki	Kiribati	Pacific Ocean	3,278 (2015)	0.46	0.18	7,126	18,460	
Ortygia (Syracuse)	Italy	Ionian Sea	4,269 (2011)	0.604	0.233	7,068	18,310	
Sulangan	Philippines	Leyte Gulf	3,834	0.56	0.22	6,846	17,730	
Rajuni Kecil Island	Indonesia	Flores Sea	3,000	0.46	0.18	6,521	16,890	6°32′18″S 120°59′54″E
Gorée (Dakar)	Senegal		1,800 (2018)	0.28	0.11	6,429	16,650	
Niigata Island (Niigata)	Japan	Sea of Japan; Shinano River	61,295 (2005)	10	3.9	6,130	15,900	
Parikud	India	Chilika Lake	89,371 (2011)	14.81	5.72 (est.)	6,035	15,630	
Cijin Island (Kaoshiung)	Taiwan	South China Sea	30,000 (2010)	5	1.9 (est)	6,000	16,000	
Rasdhoo	Maldives	Indian Ocean	1,286 (2022)	0.216	0.083	5,954	15,420	
Balboa Island (Newport Beach)	United States	Newport Bay	3,000 (2000)	0.52	0.20	5,769	14,940	
Bodufolhudhoo	Maldives	Indian Ocean	697 (2022)	0.121	0.047 (est.)	5,760	14,900	
Aspøya	Norway		3,376	0.6	0.23	5,627	14,570	62°28′14″N 6°08′16″E
Île Lacroix (Rouen)	France	Seine River	1,331	0.24	0.093	5,477	14,190	49°25′58″N 1°6′13″E
Peng Chau	Hong Kong		5,300 (est)	0.99	0.38	5,354	13,870	
Stora Essingen (Stockholm)	Sweden	Mälaren	3,892 (2006)	0.73	0.28	5,332	13,810	
Lauttasaari (Helsinki)	Finland		19,644 (2008)	3.75	1.45	5,238	13,570	
Governador Island (Rio de Janeiro)	Brazil	Guanabara Bay	212,547 (2010)	40.81	15.76	5,209	13,490	
Nuns' Island (Montréal)	Canada	St. Lawrence River	18,315 (2011)	3.74	1.44	4,897	12,680	
L'Île Saint-Denis (Grand Paris)	France	Seine River	8,646	1.77	0.68	4,885	12,650	48°56′9″N 2°20′23″E
Mathiveri	Maldives	Indian Ocean	1,024 (2022)	0.221	0.085	4,633	12,000	
Cumbarjua	India	Mandovi River	10,000 (approx.)	2.19	0.85	4,566	11,830	
Lindau Island	Germany	Lake Constance	3,000 (2008)	0.68	0.26	4,411	11,420	
City Island (New York City)	United States	Long Island Sound	4,362 (2010)	1.023	0.395	4,264	11,040	
Maradhoo (Addu City)	Maldives	Indian Ocean	3,943 (2022)	0.926	0.358	4,258	11,030	
Malapascua	Philippines	Visayan Sea	6,257	1.48	0.57	4,227	10,950	
Ezhumanthuruthu	India		3,500	0.85	0.33 (est.)	4,118	10,670	
Muharraq Island	Bahrain	Persian Gulf	200,000 (2014)	49.3	19.0	4,057	10,510	
IJsselmonde (Rotterdam)	Netherlands	Rhine–Meuse–Scheldt delta	423,000	105	41	4,058	10,510	51°52′N 4°31′E
Taipa, Cotai, and Coloane (Macau)	Macau	South China Sea	82,759 (2011)	20.58	7.95	4,021	10,410	
Île de la Cité (Paris)	France	Seine River	891 (2016)	0.22	0.085	3,960	10,300	48°51′17″N 2°20′45″E
Island of Montreal (Montréal)	Canada	confluence of the Ottawa River with the St. Lawrence	1,942,044 (2016)	499	193	3,892	10,080	
Himandhoo	Maldives	Indian Ocean	884 (2022)	0.229	0.088 (est.)	3,860	10,000	
Halat Nuaim	Bahrain	Persian Gulf	1,000 (2014)	0.27	0.10	3,704	9,590	
Yeouido (Seoul)	South Korea	Han River	31,000 (2006)	8.4	3.2	3,700	9,600	
Boracay	Philippines		37,802	10.32	3.98	3,663	9,490	11°58′6″N 121°56′3″E
Sitra	Bahrain	Persian Gulf	81,000 (2016)	22.45	8.67	3,608	9,340	
Feydhoo (Addu City)	Maldives	Indian Ocean	4,291 (2022)	1.22	0.47	3,517	9,110	
Long Beach Barrier Island	United States	Atlantic Ocean, Reynolds Channel	39,282 (2010)	11.7	4.5	3,350	8,700	40°35′17″N 73°41′17″W
Rokkō Island	Japan	Osaka Bay	19,253 (2017)	5.8	2.2	3,319	8,600	
Lidingö	Sweden	Baltic Sea	44,000 (2011)	12.54	4.84	3,300	8,500	
Just Room Enough Island (Alexandria Bay)	United States	St. Lawrence River	At least 1	0.00031	0.00012	3,226	8,360	
Staten Island (New York City)	United States		479,458 (2017)	151.5	58.5	3,165	8,200	
Songdo (Incheon)	South Korea		167,346 (2020)	53.4	20.6	3,134	8,120	
Xiaodeng Island	China		3,000 (2008)	0.97	0.37	3,102	8,030	
Hikoshima (Shimonoseki)	Japan		30,182 (2011)	9.8	3.8	3,080	8,000	
Bau	Fiji		300 (2011)	0.1	0.039	3,000	7,800	
Isla Mujeres	Mexico		12,642 (2010)	4.22	1.63	2,996	7,760	
Penang Island	Malaysia		860,000 (2010)	293	113	2,935	7,600	
Srirangapatna	India	Kaveri River	25,061	8.58	3.31	2,920	7,600	
Kavaratti	India	Indian Ocean	11,473 (2014)	3.93	1.52	2,919	7,560	
Amini	India	Indian Ocean	7,843	2.71	1.05	2,894	7,500	
Derawan Island	Indonesia	Sulawesi Sea	1,259	0.446	0.172	2,823	7,310	
Kotlin Island (Kronstadt)	Russia		42,800 (2006)	16	6.2	2,675	6,930	
Zhongshan Island	China	Pearl River Delta	2,800,000	1,055.42	407.50	2,653	6,870	
Meizhou Island	China		38,000	14.35	5.54	2,648	6,860	
Majuro	Marshall Islands		25,400 (2004)	9.7	3.7	2,619	6,780	
San Andrés	Colombia	Caribbean Sea	67,912 (2007)	26	10	2,612	6,770	12°35′N 81°42′W
Procida	Italy	Tyrrhenian Sea, Campanian Archipelago	10,596 (2010)	4.1	1.6	2,600	6,700	40°45′30″N 14°01′00″E
Jinato Island	Indonesia	Flores Sea	1,418 (2020)	0.55	0.21	2,578	6,680	6°45′25″S 120°58′06″E
Hithadhoo (Addu City)	Maldives	Indian Ocean	13,475 (2022)	5.4	2.1	2,495	6,460	
Pamanzi	Mayotte	Mozambique Channel	29,273	12.11	4.68	2,417	6,260	12°47′0″S 15°17′0″E
Agatti Island	India	Indian Ocean	7,700 (2014)	3.23	1.25	2,384	6,170	
Andrott	India	Indian Ocean	11,464 (2014)	4.98	1.92	2,302	5,960	
Nabih Saleh	Bahrain	Persian Gulf	3,200 (2019)	1.4	0.54	2,286	5,920	
Kiltan	India	Indian Ocean	4,041 (2011)	1.78	0.69	2,270	5,900	
Vallarpadam (Kochi)	India	Vembanad Lake	10,000 (approx.)	4.45	1.72 (est.)	2,247	5,820	
Minicoy	India	Indian Ocean	10,700 (2014)	4.8	1.9	2,229	5,770	
Untung Jawa	Indonesia	Java Sea	2,264 (2017)	1.03	0.40	2,198	5,690	
Amager	Denmark		204,827 (2019)	96.29	37.18	2,127	5,510	
Chavara Thekkumbhagom	India	Ashtamudi Lake	16,937 (2011)	8	3.1	2,117	5,480	
Lý Sơn	Vietnam	South China Sea	17,901	8.49	3.28	2,108	5,460	15°22′51″N 109°07′03″E
Long Island	United States	East River, Long Island Sound, Atlantic Ocean	7,568,304 (2010)	3,629	1,401	2,086	5,400	
Kulosaari (Helsinki)	Finland		3,770 (2004)	1.81	0.70	2,083	5,390	
Wheeling Island	United States	Ohio River	3,142	1.51	0.58	2,080	5,400	
Chetlat Island	India	Indian Ocean	2,400	1.17	0.45	2,051	5,310	
Pazhou (Guangzhou)	China		29,851 (2010)	15	5.8	1,990	5,200	
Paquetá Island (Rio de Janeiro)	Brazil	Guanabara Bay	3,361 (2010)	1.7	0.66	1,970	5,100	
Frauenchiemsee	Germany		300 (2008)	0.155	0.060	1,935	5,010	
Nørve	Norway		9,647	50	19	1,929	5,000	
Heybeliada (Princes' Islands)	Turkey	Sea of Marmara	4,424	2.34	0.90	1,890	4,900	40°52′40″N 29°05′30″E
Liuqiu Island	Taiwan		12,675 (2014)	6.8	2.6	1,864	4,830	
Kirklandet	Norway		10,952	5.9	2.3	1,856	4,810	63°07′24″N 7°43′32″E
Fuvahmulah	Maldives	Indian Ocean	9,166 (2022)	4.94	1.91	1,855	4,800	
Ternate	Indonesia	Molucca Sea	204,215 (2014)	111.39	43.01	1,833	4,750	
Lido Isle (Newport Beach)	United States	Newport Bay	1,800 (2000)	1.0	0.39	1,800	4,700	
Phú Quý	Vietnam	South China Sea	30,971 (2018)	17.5	6.8	1,778	4,600	10°31′48″N 108°56′34″E
Malta Island	Malta	Mediterranean Sea	433,082 (2019)	246	95	1,760	4,600	
Eden Island	Seychelles	Indian Ocean	1,000 (2014)	0.57	0.22	1,754	4,540	
Lulu Island (Richmond)	Canada	Fraser River estuary, Strait of Georgia	198,309 (2016)	120	46	1,653	4,280	
Beigang Island (Haikou)	China	Dongzhai Harbor	1,550	0.94	0.36	1,649	4,270	
Key West	United States	Gulf of Mexico, Straits of Florida	24,649 (2010)	15.4	5.9	1,600	4,100	24°33′33″N 81°47′2″W
Büyükada (Princes' Islands)	Turkey	Sea of Marmara	8,586	5.38	2.08	1,595	4,130	40°51′28″N 29°07′12″E
New Providence	Bahamas	Atlantic Ocean	248,948 (2010)	207	80	1,594	4,130	25°2′N 77°24′W
Mercer Island	United States	Lake Washington	25,976 (2018)	16.4	6.3	1,584	4,100	
Maalhos	Maldives	Indian Ocean	516 (2022)	0.327	0.126 (est.)	1,578	4,090	
Bitra (main island)	India	Indian Ocean	278	0.177	0.068	1,571	4,070	
Bahrain Island	Bahrain	Persian Gulf	940,000 (2010)	604	233	1,556	4,030	26°2′N 50°33′E
Dordrecht	Netherlands	Rhine–Meuse–Scheldt delta	119,576	78.54	30.32	1,522	3,940	51°48′N 4°40′E
Ischia	Italy	Tyrrhenian Sea, Campanian Archipelago	70,043 (2019)	46.3	17.9	1,512	3,920	
Tromsøya (Tromsø)	Norway		33,668 (2008)	22.79	8.80	1,503	3,890	
Kınalıada (Princes' Islands)	Turkey	Sea of Marmara	2,025	1.36	0.53	1,488	3,850	40°54′35″N 29°3′0″E
Kalpeni	India	Indian Ocean	4,526 (2014)	3.08	1.19	1,469	3,800	
Lehtisaari (Helsinki)	Finland		1,148 (2008)	0.79	0.31	1,453	3,760	
Öckerö	Sweden		3,488 (2010)	2.42	0.93	1,441	3,730	
Pirallahi Island	Azerbaijan	Caspian Sea	20,578	14.6	5.6	1,409	3,650	
Kuusisaari (Helsinki)	Finland		588 (2008)	0.40	0.15	1,395	3,610	
Île Jésus (Laval)	Canada		400,000 (2010)	245	95	1,384	3,580	
Bet Dwarka	India	Gulf of Kutch	15,000 (2011)	11	4.2	1,364	3,530	
St. Martin's Island	Bangladesh	Bay of Bengal	4,000 (2010)	3	1.2	1,333	3,450	
Bantayan	Philippines	Tañon Strait; Visayan Sea	142,457	108.77	42.00	1,310	3,400	11°13′3″N 123°44′54″E
Smögen	Sweden		1,329 (2010)	1.05	0.41	1,266	3,280	
Bhola Island	Bangladesh		1,800,000 (2020)	1,441	556	1,249	3,230	
Feridhoo	Maldives	Indian Ocean	543 (2022)	0.445	0.172 (est.)	1,220	3,200	
Chizumulu Island	Malawi	Lake Malawi	4,000	3.39	1.31 (est.)	1,180	3,100	
Labuan	Malaysia		99,500 (2019)	85	33	1,171	3,030	
Capri	Italy	Tyrrhenian Sea	12,200 (2002)	10.4	4.0	1,170	3,000	
Okinawa Island	Japan	Pacific Ocean	1,384,762 (2009)	1,207.87	466.36	1,146	2,970	
Diu Island	India	Arabian Sea	44,215 (2015)	38.8	15.0	1,140	3,000	
Mukaishima Island	Japan	Seto Inland Sea	25,816 (2003)	23.31	9.00	1,108	2,870	
Burgazada (Princes' Islands)	Turkey	Sea of Marmara	1,655	1.5	0.58	1,103	2,860	40°52′47.66″N 29°3′42.32″E
Penghu Island	Taiwan		70,200 (2010)	64	25	1,100	2,800	
Bhutni	India	Ganges River, Fulahar River	89,021	81.58	31.50 (est.)	1,091	2,830	
Treasure and Yerba Buena (San Francisco)	United States	San Francisco Bay	2,500 (2010)	2.334	0.901	1,071	2,770	
Java	Indonesia	Indian Ocean, Java Sea	141,000,000 (2015)	132,187	51,038	1,067	2,760	
Edayilakkad	India		1,305	1.26	0.49	1,036	2,680	
São Luís Island	Brazil	Gulf of Maranhão	1,442,927	1,402	541	1,023	2,650	
Zhoushan Island	China	Hangzhou Bay	502,667	502.65	194.07	1,000	2,600	
Şövalye Island (Knight Island)	Turkey	Aegean Sea	110	0.11	0.042	1,000	2,600	36°39′2.2″N 29°6′7.5″E

== Densely populated archipelagos ==
These archipelagos have a density of over 1,000 people/km^{2} (2,600 people/sq mi), meaning at least one island must have over 1,000 people/km^{2} (2,600 people/sq mi). However, there is no available data for the individual islands.

Archipelago	Country/Territory	Number of islands	Population	Area		Density	
Archipelago	Country/Territory	Number of islands	Population	km^{2}	sq mi	per km^{2}	per sq mi
Thousand Islands	Indonesia	342	27,749 (2020)	10.18	3.93	2,726	7,060
Amwaj Islands	Bahrain	9	10,000 (2010)	4.31	1.66	2,320	6,000
Balabalagan Islands	Indonesia	14	2,201 (2020)	1.47	0.57	1,497	3,880
Bermuda	Bermuda	181	63,913 (2019 estimate)	53.2	20.5	1,201	3,110
Dongshan	China	44	200,000	194	75	1,031	2,670

== Other notable islands ==
Island	Country	Population	Area		Density		Year	Refs
Island	Country	Population	km^{2}	sq mi	per km^{2}	per sq mi	Year	Refs
Cebu	Philippines	3,979,155	4,467.5	1,724.9	890	2,300	2015	
Mauritius	Mauritius	1,263,089	1,865	720	680	1,800	2012	
Taiwan	Taiwan	23,000,000	35,801	13,823	642	1,660	2008	
Ambon Island	Indonesia	501,364	803.9	310.4	624	1,620	2014	
Aquidneck Island, Rhode Island	United States	60,870	98	38	621	1,610	2000	
Unguja	Tanzania	896,721	643	248	538	1,390		
Nauru	Nauru	10,084	21	8.1	480	1,200		2011
Luzon	Philippines	48,520,774	104,688	40,420	463	1,200	2010	
Tenerife	Spain	931,646	2,034	785	457	1,180	2022	
Honshū	Japan	103,000,000	230,500	89,000	447	1,160	2005	
Lamma Island	Hong Kong	5,500	13.74	5.31	400	1,000	2007	
Kyūshū	Japan	13,231,995	35,640	13,760	371	960		
Puerto Rico	Puerto Rico	3,205,691	8,868	3,424	361.4	936	2023	
Réunion	France	885,700	2,511	970	353	910	2013	
Madeira	Portugal	245,595	741	286	331	860	2021	
Sri Lanka (main island)	Sri Lanka	21,184,000	65,268	25,200	325	840	2008	
Mindanao	Philippines	29,968,174	94,630	36,540	317	820	2010	
Great Britain	United Kingdom	61,450,000	209,331	80,823	294	760	2011	
Awaji Island	Japan	147,359	592.17	228.64	249	640		
Mallorca	Spain	869,067	3,640.11	1,405.45	239	620		
Shikoku	Japan	4,141,955	18,800	7,300	220	570	2005	
Sicily	Italy	5,051,075	25,700	9,900	197	510	2010	
Langkawi, Kedah	Malaysia	65,000	479	185	136	350	2010	
Sulawesi (Celebes)	Indonesia	17,371,783	180,681	69,761	96	250	2010	
Sumatra	Indonesia	45,000,000	470,000	180,000	96	250	2005	
Ireland	Ireland; United Kingdom	6,197,100	84,421	32,595	73	190	2008	
Madagascar	Madagascar	31,964,956	592,796	228,880	55	140	2024	
Borneo	Brunei; Indonesia; Malaysia	21,258,000	748,168	288,869	28	73	2014	
Vancouver Island	Canada	775,347	31,285	12,079	24.8	64	2016	
New Guinea	Indonesia; Papua New Guinea	11,306,940	785,753	303,381	14	36	2014	
Iceland	Iceland	350,710	101,826	39,315	3.4	8.8	2018	

== Least densely populated islands ==
There are numerous uninhabited or deserted islands. The largest uninhabited island in the world is Devon Island in Canada. The list contains islands with densities below 0.1/km^{2} (0.26/sq mi). Note that many of these populations are non-permanent.

Island	Country/Territory	Population	Area		Density	
Island	Country/Territory	Population	km^{2}	sq mi	per km^{2}	per sq mi
Kotelny Island	Russia	2	23,165	8,944	0.000086	0.00022
Ellesmere Island	Canada	146	196,235	75,767	0.000744	0.00193
Banks Island	Canada	103	70,028	27,038	0.0014	0.0036
Clarence Island	Chile	5	1,111	429	0.0045	0.012
Seguam Island	United States	1	215	83	0.00465	0.0120
Alexandra Land	Russia	5	1,050	410	0.00476	0.0123
Kuiu Island	United States	10	1,936	747	0.005	0.013
Grande-Terre (Kerguelen)	French Southern and Antarctic Lands	45	6,675	2,577	0.007	0.018
James Ross Island	Antarctica	20 (summer)	2,598	1,003	0.0077	0.020
James Ross Island	Antarctica	0 (winter)	2,598	1,003	0	0
Santa Cruz Island	United States	2	250	97	0.008	0.021
Unimak Island	United States	35	4,119	1,590	0.0085	0.022
Victoria Island	Canada	1,875	217,291	83,897	0.0086	0.022
South Georgia	South Georgia and the South Sandwich Islands	32	3,528	1,362	0.0091	0.024
Santa Rosa Island	United States	2	215.3	83.1	0.0093	0.024
Etolin Island	United States	15	878.1	339.0	0.017	0.044
Adelaide Island	Antarctica	100 (approx.)	4,663	1,800	0.0215	0.056
Baffin Island	Canada	11,000	507,451	195,928	0.0217	0.056
Umnak	United States	39	1,776.8	686.0	0.022	0.057
Bear Island	Norway	4	178	69	0.0223	0.058
Hawkins Island	United States	4	176	68	0.0227	0.059
Shuyak Island	United States	4	168.3	65.0	0.024	0.062
Southampton Island	Canada	1,035	41,214	15,913	0.025	0.065
Greenland	(Danish Realm) Kingdom of Denmark	56,452	2,166,086	836,330	0.0261	0.068
Cornwallis Island	Canada	183	6,995	2,701	0.0262	0.068
Anticosti Island	Canada	218	7,953	3,071	0.027	0.070
Dundee Island	Antarctica	10	347	134	0.0288	0.075
Hinchinbrook Island	United States	5	172	66	0.029	0.075
Dall Island	United States	20	657.9	254.0	0.03	0.078
Vaygach Island	Russia	106	3,383	1,306	0.031	0.080
West Falkland	Falkland Islands	160	4,532	1,750	0.035	0.091
Deception Island	Antarctica	3 (winter)	79	31	0.04	0.10
Deception Island	Antarctica	51 (summer)	79	31	0.65	1.7
Nunivak Island	United States	191	4,226.8	1,632.0	0.045	0.12
Sukkwan Island	United States	9	167	64	0.05	0.13
Curtis Island	Australia	36	675.9	261.0	0.053	0.14
Greenwich Island	Antarctica	8 (winter)	143	55	0.056	0.15
Greenwich Island	Antarctica	62 (summer)	143	55	0.43	1.1
Wellington Island	Chile	340	5,556	2,145	0.06	0.16
Spitsbergen	Norway	2,642	37,673	14,546	0.07	0.18
Ross Island	Antarctica	174 (winter)	2,460	950	0.071	0.18
Ross Island	Antarctica	1,088 (summer)	2,460	950	0.44	1.1
Alamagan	Northern Mariana Islands	1	12.96	5.00	0.0772	0.200
Heceta Island	United States	14	181	70	0.0773	0.200
Atka Island	United States	95	1,048.8	404.9	0.09	0.23
Agrihan	Northern Mariana Islands	4	44.05	17.01	0.091	0.24
Fraser Island	Australia	152	1,655	639	0.092	0.24
Afognak	United States	169	1,812.6	699.8	0.093	0.24
Cockburn Island	Canada	16	171	66	0.094	0.24

== See also ==
- Lists of islands
- List of islands by population
- List of islands by area
- List of populated islands of the Great Lakes
- Hashima Island
- Bidong Island
- Bishop Rock
