= Terong Island =

Island in Indonesia

- Location within Indonesia

Geography
- Coordinates: 00°56′49″N 103°45′55″E
- Area: 0.04 km^{2} (0.015 sq mi)

Administration
- Indonesia

Demographics
- Population: 3000
- Pop. density: 75,000/km^{2} (194000/sq mi)

Terong is the name given to an island in the city of Batam, province of the Riau Islands, in the Asian country of Indonesia. It is known as one of the most densely populated islands in its country and ranks among the five most densely populated islands in the world, with around 3,000 residents living in an area of approximately 0.04 square kilometers, resulting in a population density of 75,000 inhabitants per square kilometer.

== See also ==
- List of islands of Indonesia
- List of islands by population density
- Santa Cruz del Islote
