= Caohagan Island =

Island in the Cebu Strait in the Philippines

Isla sa Caohagan
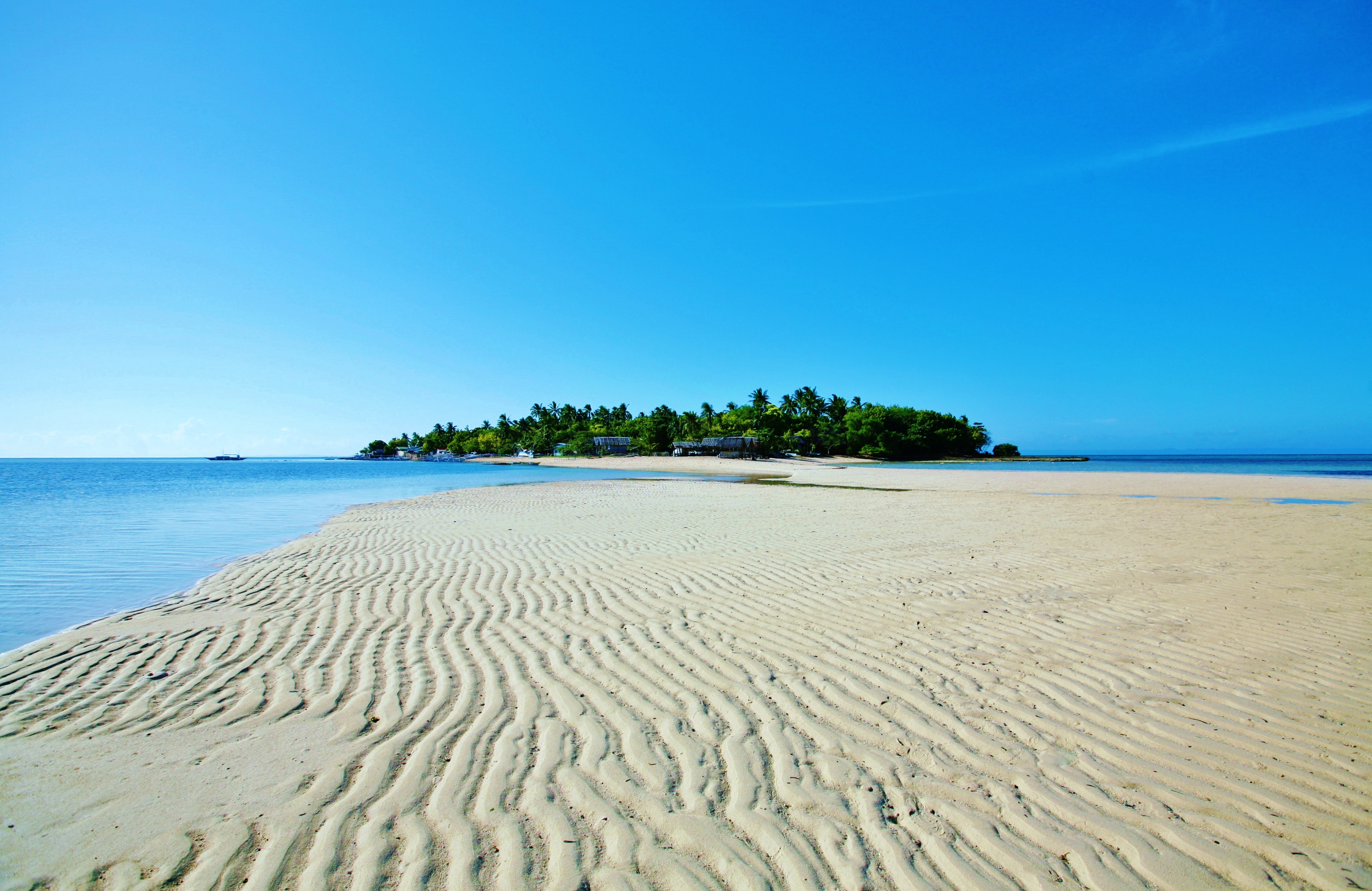
- Beach in Caohagan Island

- Location within Visayas

Geography
- Coordinates: 10°12′10″N 124°1′11″E
- Archipelago: Philippine
- Adjacent to: Cebu Strait
- Area: 0.05 km^{2} (0.019 sq mi)

Administration
- Philippines
- Region: Central Visayas
- City: Lapu-Lapu City
- Barangay: Cawhagan

Demographics
- Population: 658 (2024)
- Pop. density: 13,160/km^{2} (34080/sq mi)
- Ethnic groups: Cebuano

Caohagan, or sometimes spelled Cawhagan, is an island located in the Cebu Strait in the Philippines. The island is one of the islands that constitute the Olango Island Group, a group of islands off the coast of Mactan Island. Caohagan is under the jurisdiction of the city of Lapu-Lapu. Although, many residents still rely on fishing but some inhabitants of Caohagan are employed in tourism, working in the beach resort in the island, selling merchandise for tourists, opened food stalls and providing island-hopping tours.

According to the latest 2024 census, the population of Caohagan is 658. Because of its distance from the mainland, households use solar panels for their electricity. The local government have provided solar panels to indigent residents of the island.

Natural hazards such as typhoons threaten the island. In 2021 Caohagan was affected by the onslaught of Typhoon Rai or Supertyphoon Odette. The government and non-government groups provided relief and recovery activities to help the families affected by the typhoon.

== Tourism ==
Caohagan Island is becoming one of the prime tourist attractions in Cebu, since it has a wide white powdered beach and a marine sanctuary, where tourists can do underwater diving or snorkeling to the island's adjacent coral reefs. People can also buy fresh sea produce in the island's seafood market.

== Transport ==
There are no scheduled boat trips to the island, but there are chartered motorized bangkas, available in the ports in Cordova, Angasil and Marigondon, where people can travel to Caohagan.

== Education ==
The island has one public elementary school, Cawhagan Elementary School.

== See also ==
- List of islands by population density
