= Sitangkai Island =

Island in Tawi-Tawi, Philippines

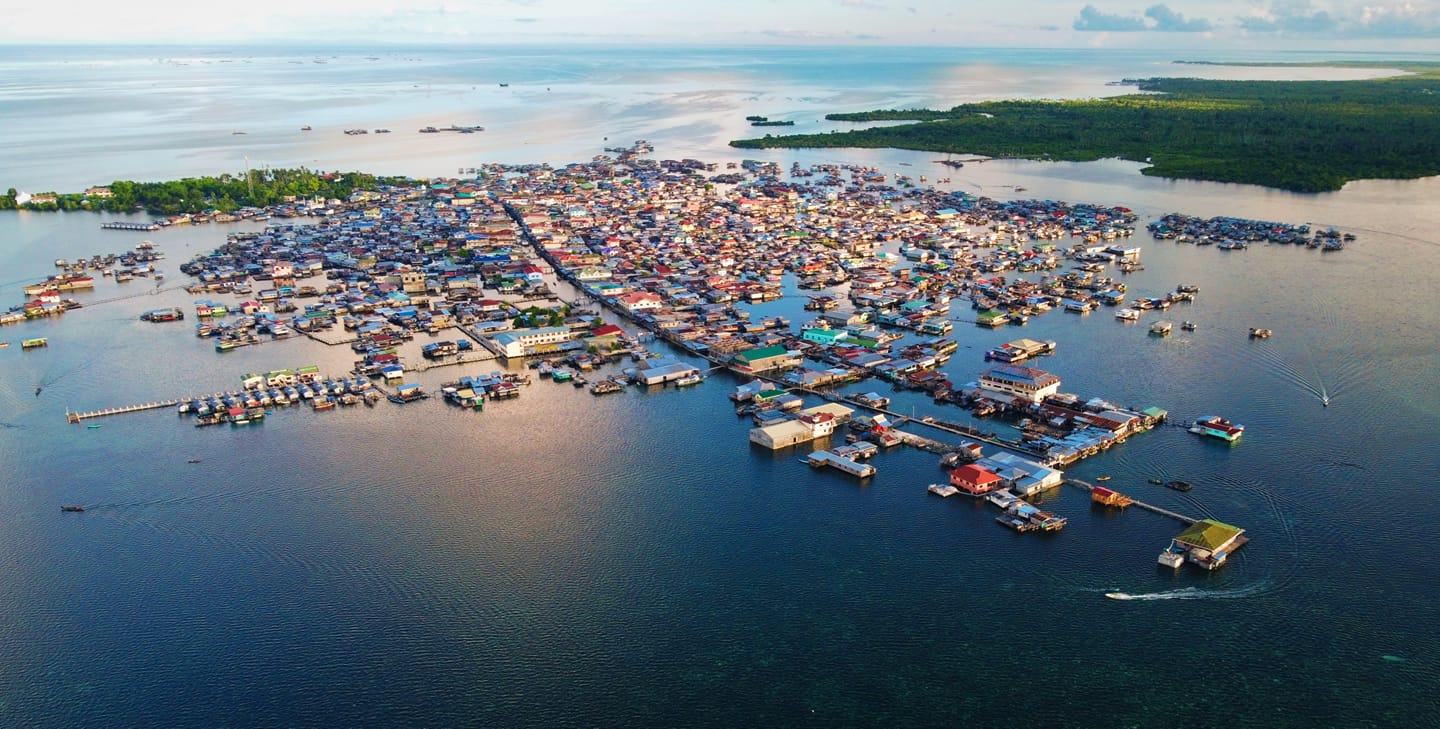
- Sitangkai Island, Tawi-Tawi

- Location within Mindanao

Geography
- Coordinates: 4°39′43″N 119°23′34″E
- Archipelago: Sulu
- Adjacent to: Celebes Sea
- Area: 0.3 km^{2} (0.12 sq mi)

Administration
- Philippines
- Region: Bangsamoro
- Province: Tawi-Tawi
- Municipality: Sitangkai

Demographics
- Population: 15,255 (2020)
- Pop. density: 50,850/km^{2} (131700/sq mi)
- Ethnic groups: Sama; Tausug

Sitangkai Island is an island located in the province of Tawi-Tawi, Philippines. It is part of the chain of islands that are found in between the islands of Borneo and Mindanao, called the Sulu Archipelago. The town center or the urban area of the municipality of Sitangkai is concentrated on the island. The island is divided and locally administered by the barangays of Sitangkai Poblacion, Datu Bagunida Putih and Panglima Alari. Most of the residents engage in trading, seaweeds farming and fishing. With an estimated population of 15,255 and with an area of around 0.3 km^{2}, Sitangkai Island is one of the most densely populated islands in the country.

The island is dubbed as the “Venice of the Philippines”. Just like the famous Italian city, Sitangkai expanded its size by reclaiming the sea and houses and structures are built on this artificial land. And instead of wide streets, people navigate through canals to go around the different parts of the island.

== History ==
It is believed that the original area of the island was just a fifth of the size area in the present times. The first Sama-Bajau settlers had their houses on stilts, but as the island became a trading center and population grew and over time, the residents expanded the island by extracting dead corals from the seafloor, piled them to build reclaimed land. Prior to the colonization of the Philippines by Spain, Sitangkai was under the Sultanate of Sulu. The sultanate covered from the western edges of Zamboanga, southern Palawan and the coastal areas of North Borneo or Sabah. Although the sultanate is composed of different ethnic groups, the government and its economy is dominated by the Tausugs. After centuries of attempts to subjugate the Sultanate of Sulu, the sultanate only was defeated and became under a protectorate of Spain in 1851. North Borneo was eventually given to the British through the North Borneo Chartered Company after a lease agreement was signed between the two parties in 1878. Then in 1903, the once Spanish-controlled area of the sultanate was annexed to the Americans but it was only completely controlled in 1913.

Sitangkai became a municipality in 1959 by virtue of Executive Order No. 355 of Pres. Carlos P. Garcia. The town became part of the newly formed province of Tawi-Tawi in 1973.

Because of its close proximity to the border with Malaysia, Sitangkai became a stopping point for backdoor migrants and illegal smuggled items.

== Geography ==
The island of Sitangkai is located at the southern part of the Sulu Archipelago. The area of the island is around 0.3 km^{2}. In the north, the bigger Tumindao Island, also a part of the municipality of Sitangkai, is around a half kilometer away from the island. Across the south of Sitangkai is the island of Gusi.

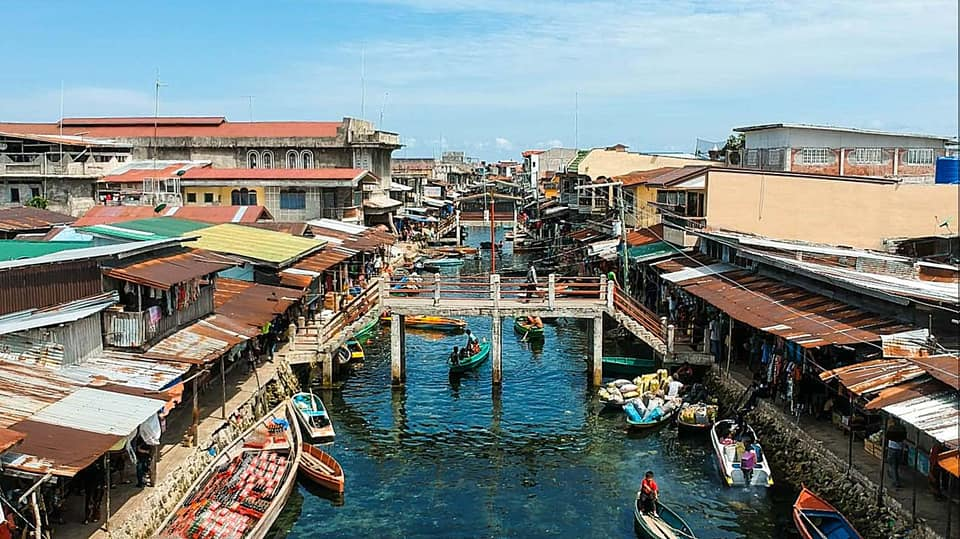
Waterway Canal at the commercial center in Sitangkai

== Demographics ==
Majority of the residents of the island are part of the Sama ethnic group and practice Islam.The total population of the island has 15,255 inhabitants.

Here is the population of the barangays of Sitangkai island according to the recent census.

Barangay	Population (2020)
Datu Baguinda Putih	3,104
Panglima Alari	8,417
Sitangkai Poblacion	3,734
Total	15,255

== Transport ==
There are regular boat trips every Monday, Wednesday and Friday from the capital of Tawi-Tawi, Bongao to Sitangkai.

== See also ==
• List of islands by population density
