= Pugad Island (Bulacan) =

Island in Bulacan, Philippines

Pulo ng Pugad
- Location within Luzon Location within Philippines

Geography
- Coordinates: 14°46′03″N 120°44′32″E
- Adjacent to: Manila Bay; Angat River
- Area: 0.04 km^{2} (0.015 sq mi)

Administration
- Philippines
- Region: Central Luzon
- Province: Bulacan
- Municipality: Hagonoy

Demographics
- Population: 1,636 (2020)
- Pop. density: 40,900/km^{2} (105900/sq mi)
- Ethnic groups: Tagalog

Pugad Island is a small densely populated island situated in Manila Bay and at the mouth of the Angat – Pampanga River Delta. The island is part of the municipality of Hagonoy, Bulacan. Once, mangrove forests and marshes were proximate in the area and then over time people converted them into fish ponds, which they utilize today in cultivating aquatic organisms such as clams, whiting fish and mussels. According to the latest national census, the island has a population of 1,636.

== Natural Hazards and Disasters ==
Situated in the overlap of two major river systems, flooding has become a norm especially during monsoon season. Flood waters submerge the island during high tide and when heavy rainfall brought by typhoons, which causes the dams upstream to spill excess water. In 2023, three tropical cyclones resulted to major flooding in Pugad Island and in low-lying areas in Central Luzon.

The frequent occurrence of flooding in the area are linked to urban and population expansion in the area, the decreasing area of mangrove forests, which buffered the island from tides and the threat of rising sea levels due to the melting of the ice sheets and climate change.

A study by the Harvard Humanitarian Initiative, in partnership with the Ateneo de Manila University and the University of Santo Tomas presents various factors that hinder community resilience in small island communities in the Philippines, which includes limited resources and inadequate policies for the implementation of community-based disaster risk reduction and management. The findings of the report are gathered primarily from the responses and experiences of community leaders and residents of Pugad Island.

== See also ==
- List of islands by population density
