= Placer, Masbate =

Municipality in Masbate, Philippines

Placer Lungsod sa Placer Pueblo de Cervantéz
- Municipality
- Municipality of Placer
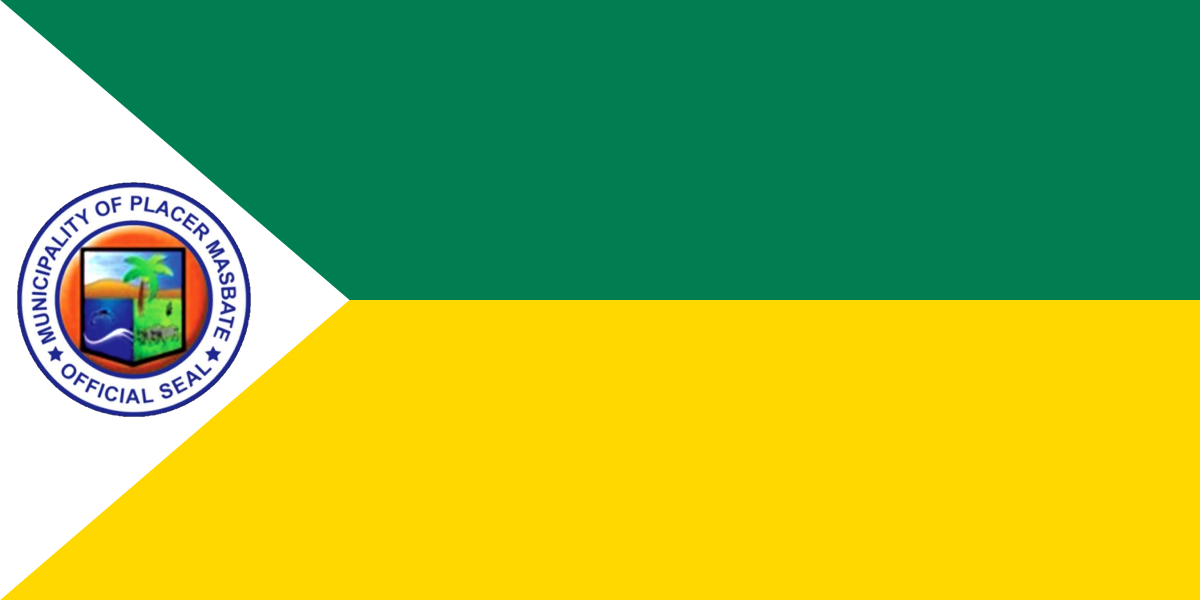
- Flag

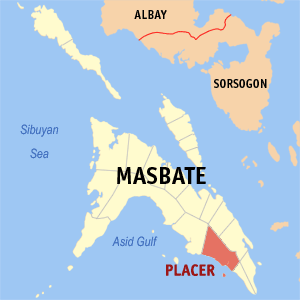
- Map of Masbate with Placer highlighted
- Interactive map of Placer
- Location within the Philippines
- Coordinates: 11°52′08″N 123°55′00″E
- Country: Philippines
- Region: Bicol Region
- Province: Masbate
- District: 3rd district
- Barangays: 35 (see Barangays)

Government
  - Type: Sangguniang Bayan
  - Mayor: Eusebio P. Dumoran Jr.
  - Vice Mayor: Mark A. Tinegra
  - Representative: Wilton T. Kho
  - Municipal Council: Members: Mark Joel P. Dumoran; Mayet E. Lepatan.; Ilona Jean M. Lepatan; Michael S. Sevilleno Jr.; Ramil C. Camay; Jose Renan A. Ybañez; Grace D. Espenilla; Jose B. Abellare
  - Electorate: 39,115 voters (2025)

Area
  - Total: 193.03 km^{2} (74.53 sq mi)
- Elevation: 8.0 m (26.2 ft)
- Highest elevation: 59 m (194 ft)
- Lowest elevation: 0 m (0 ft)

Population (2024 census)
  - Total: 56,658
  - Density: 293.52/km^{2} (760.21/sq mi)
  - Households: 13,197

Economy
  - Income class: 1st municipal income class
  - Poverty incidence: 21.58% (2023)
  - Revenue: ₱ 243.6 million (2024)
  - Assets: ₱ 1,065 million (2024)
  - Expenditure: ₱ 238.1 million (2024)
  - Liabilities: ₱ 478.5 million (2024)

Service provider
  - Electricity: Masbate Electric Cooperative (MASELCO)
- Time zone: UTC+8 (PST)
- ZIP code: 5408
- PSGC: 0504117000
- IDD : area code: +63 (0)56
- Native languages: Cebuano; Tagalog
- Website: www.placer.gov.ph

Placer, officially the Municipality of Placer (Cebuano: Lungsod sa Placer), is a municipality in the province of Masbate, Philippines. According to the 2024 census, it has a population of 56,658 people.

== History ==
By virtue of Republic Act No. 292, passed on June 16, 1948, the barrio of Placer was constituted as its own municipality, separate from Cataingan. The barrio of Esperanza (the then-largest barrio of Placer) eventually separated from Placer as a new municipality in 1959.

== Geography ==
Placer is 95 kilometres (59 mi) from Masbate City.

=== Barangays ===
Placer is politically subdivided into 35 barangays. Each barangay consists of puroks and some have sitios.

- Aguada
- Ban-Ao
- Burabod
- Cabangcalan
- Calumpang
- Camayabsan
- Daan-lungsod
- Dangpanan
- Daraga
- Guin-Awayan
- Guinhan-Ayan
- Katipunan
- Libas
- Locso-An
- Luna
- Mahayag
- Mahayahay
- Manlut-Od
- Matagangtang
- Naboctot
- Nagarao
- Nainday
- Naocondiot
- Pasiagon
- Pili
- Poblacion
- Puro
- Quibrada
- San Marcos
- Santa Cruz
- Taboc
- Tan-Awan
- Taverna
- Tubod
- Villa-Inocencio

=== Climate ===
Climate data for Placer, Masbate
Month	Jan	Feb	Mar	Apr	May	Jun	Jul	Aug	Sep	Oct	Nov	Dec	Year
Mean daily maximum °C (°F)	29 (84)	29 (84)	31 (88)	32 (90)	32 (90)	31 (88)	30 (86)	30 (86)	30 (86)	30 (86)	29 (84)	29 (84)	30 (86)
Mean daily minimum °C (°F)	23 (73)	22 (72)	23 (73)	23 (73)	25 (77)	25 (77)	24 (75)	25 (77)	24 (75)	24 (75)	24 (75)	23 (73)	24 (75)
Average precipitation mm (inches)	39 (1.5)	34 (1.3)	42 (1.7)	36 (1.4)	73 (2.9)	109 (4.3)	118 (4.6)	108 (4.3)	129 (5.1)	136 (5.4)	112 (4.4)	89 (3.5)	1,025 (40.4)
Average rainy days	12.6	9.7	12.0	13.0	20.5	25.3	26.2	24.8	25.2	25.9	21.9	17.9	235
Source: Meteoblue

== Demographics ==
Population census of Placer

Year	Pop.	±% p.a.
1903	2,112	—
1960	21,235	+4.13%
1970	30,174	+3.57%
1975	29,639	−0.36%
1980	35,710	+3.80%
1990	38,568	+0.77%
1995	40,394	+0.87%

Year	Pop.	±% p.a.
2000	44,418	+2.06%
2007	48,469	+1.21%
2010	55,438	+5.01%
2015	55,826	+0.13%
2020	56,340	+0.19%
2024	56,658	+0.14%

Source: Philippine Statistics Authority

In the 2024 census, the population of Placer was 56,658 people, with a density of 290 inhabitants per square kilometre or 750 inhabitants per square mile.

Placer is one of the only four municipalities in Masbate which is dominantly Cebuano-speaking, the other being the adjacent municipalities of Esperanza, Pio V. Corpuz, and Cawayan.

== Economy ==
Poverty incidence of Placer (%)

Source: Philippine Statistics Authority

== Education ==
There are two schools district offices which govern all educational institutions within the municipality. They oversee the management and operations of all private and public, from primary to secondary schools. These are the:

- Placer East Schools District
- Place West Schools District

=== Primary and elementary schools ===
- Aguada Elementary School
- Ban-ao Elementary School
- Bugtong Cawayan Elementary School
- Burabod Elementary School
- Cabangcalan Elementary School
- Calumpang Elementary School
- Camayabsan Elementary School
- Celera-Inocencio Central School
- Dangpanan Elementary School
- Daraga Elementary School
- Doroteo B. Presno Elementary School
- Felifranco R. Avenido Sr. Memorial Elementary School
- Felomino Yray Elementary School
- Guin-awayan Elementary School
- Ken Ville School
- Libas Elementary School
- Lt. Nilo R. Inocencio Elementary School
- Locso-an Elementary School
- Luna Elementary School
- M & R Lecciones Elementary School
- Mahayag Elementary School
- Mahayahay Elementary School
- Manlot-od Elementary School
- Matagangtang Elementary School
- Nagarao Elementary School
- Nainday Elementary School
- Naocondiot Elementary School
- Placer SDA Multigrade School
- Puro Elementary School
- Quibrada Elementary School
- San Marcos Elementary School
- San Pero Elementary School
- Taboc Elementary School
- Tan-awan Elementary School
- Taverna Elementary School
- Tomas M. Conde Central School
- Tubod Elementary School
- Yadah Christian School

=== Secondary schools ===
- Alejando Hermosa MES
- Arriesgado-Sevilleno High School
- Bugtong Cawayan ES
- Cabangcalan ES
- G. Bangalisan National High School
- Gulay-Mayer National High School
- Institute of the Orient
- Rodolfo Z. Titong National High School
- Southern Masbate Roosevelt College
- Verdida-Sabrido High School
- Vivencio P. Casas Sr. Memorial High School
