= List of islands of Haiti =

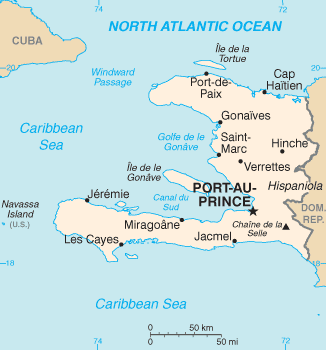
Map of Haiti

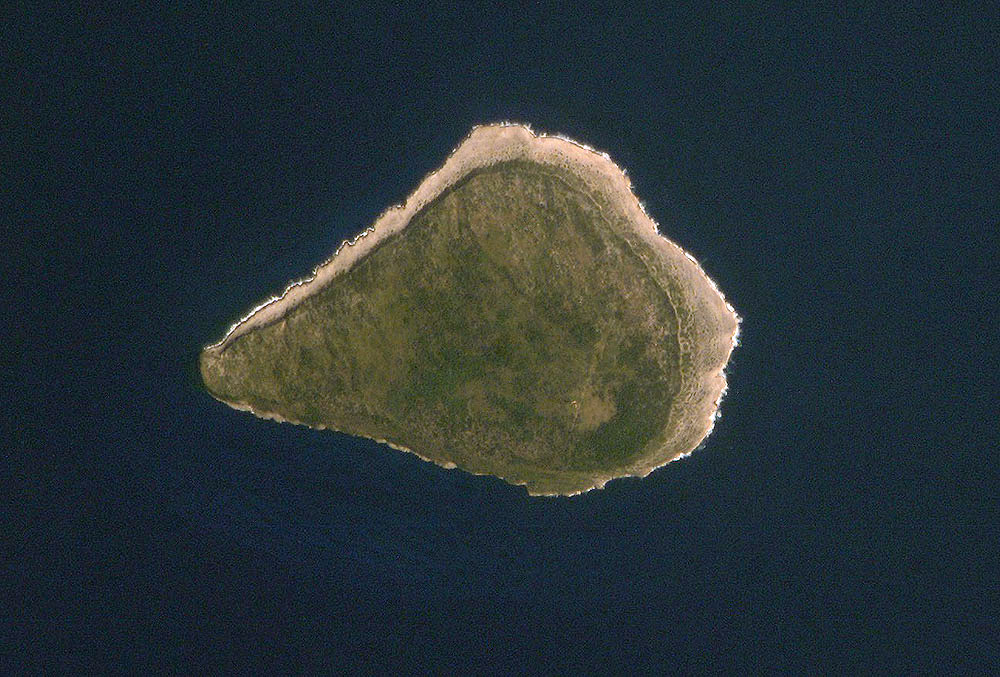
Navassa Island

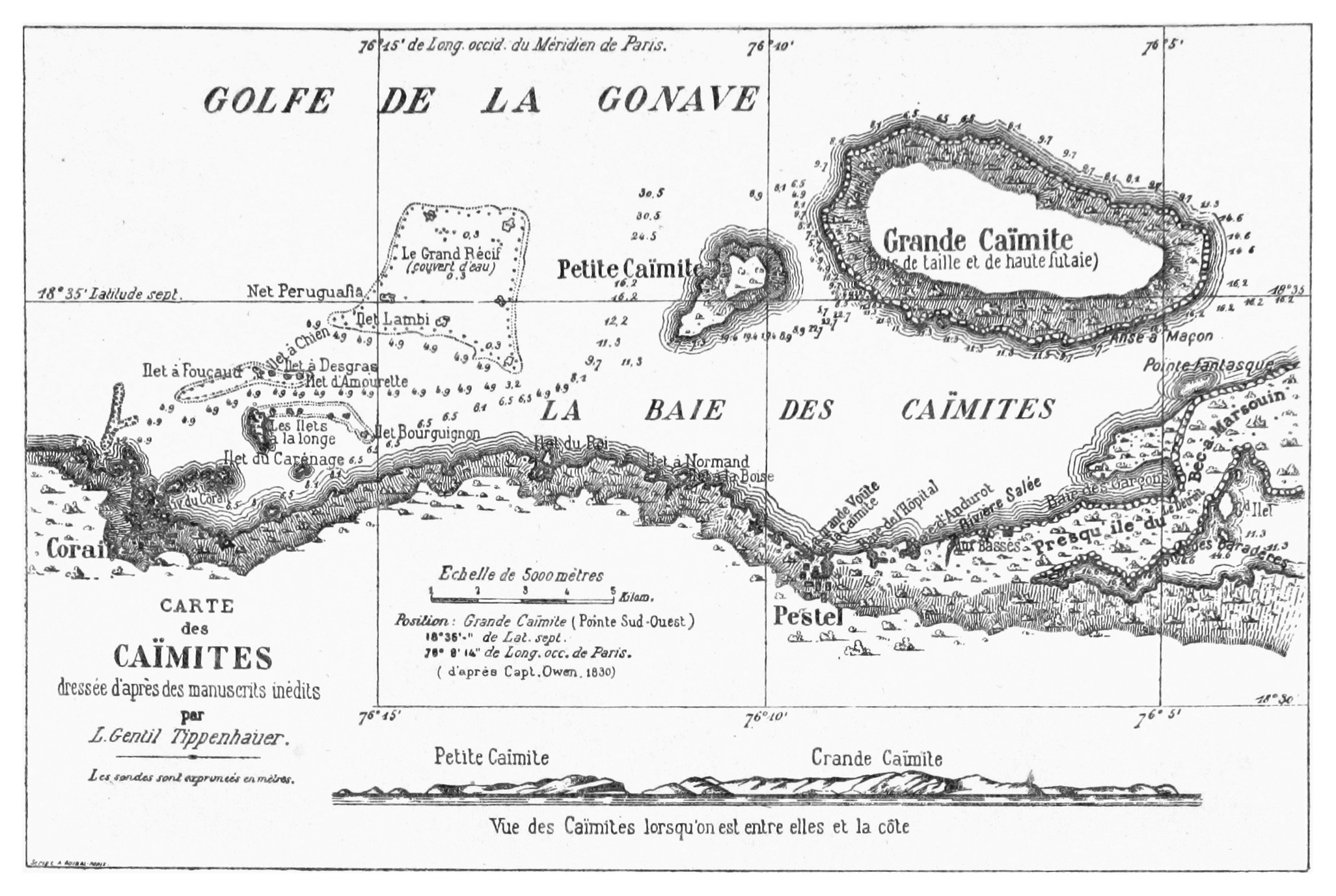
Map of Les Cayemites

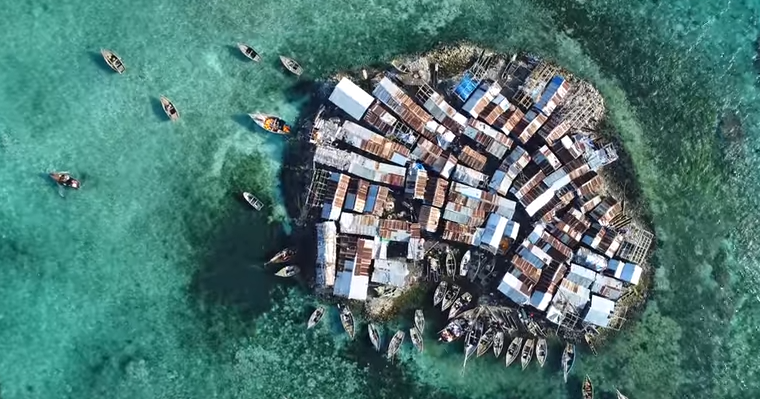
Caye Sable

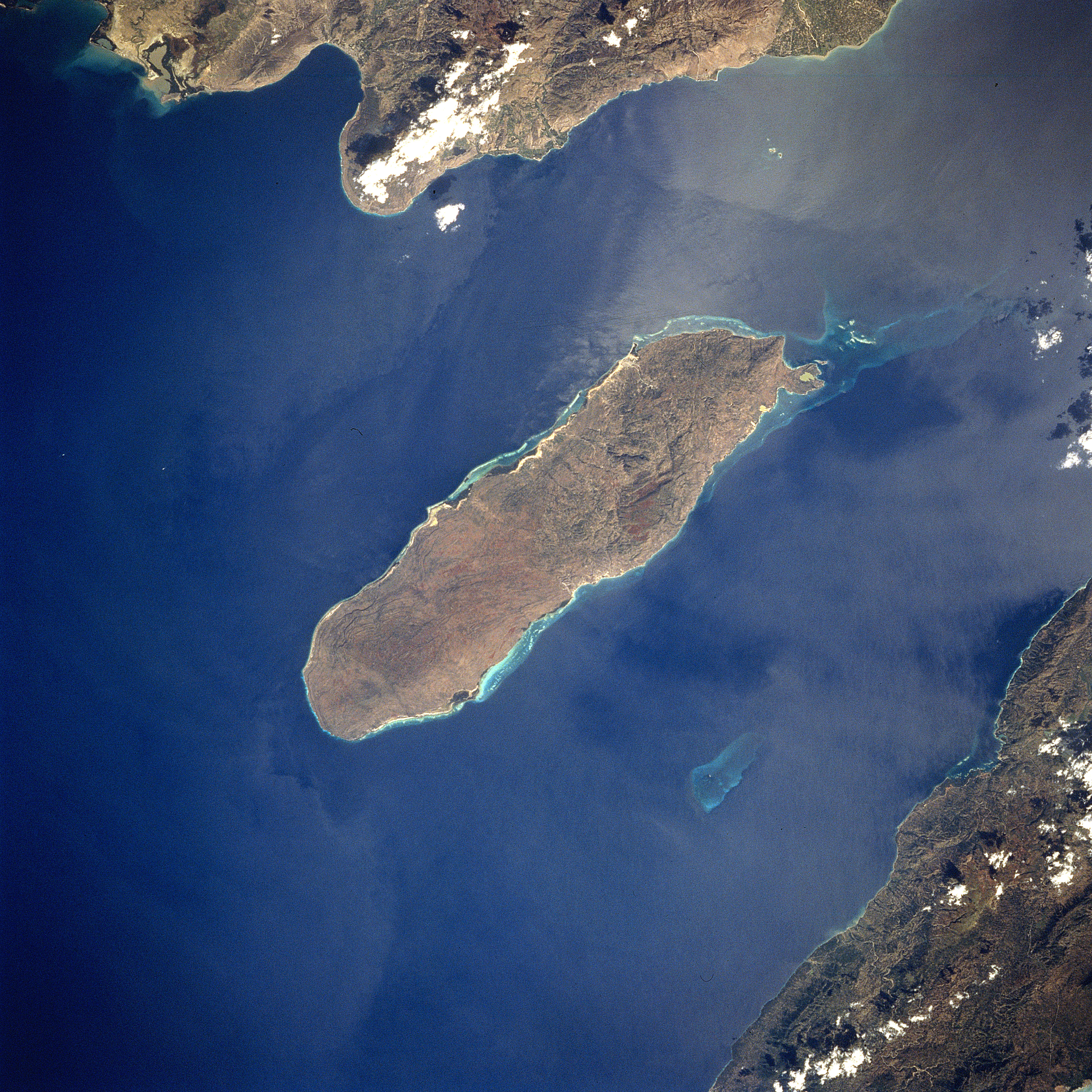
Gonâve Island

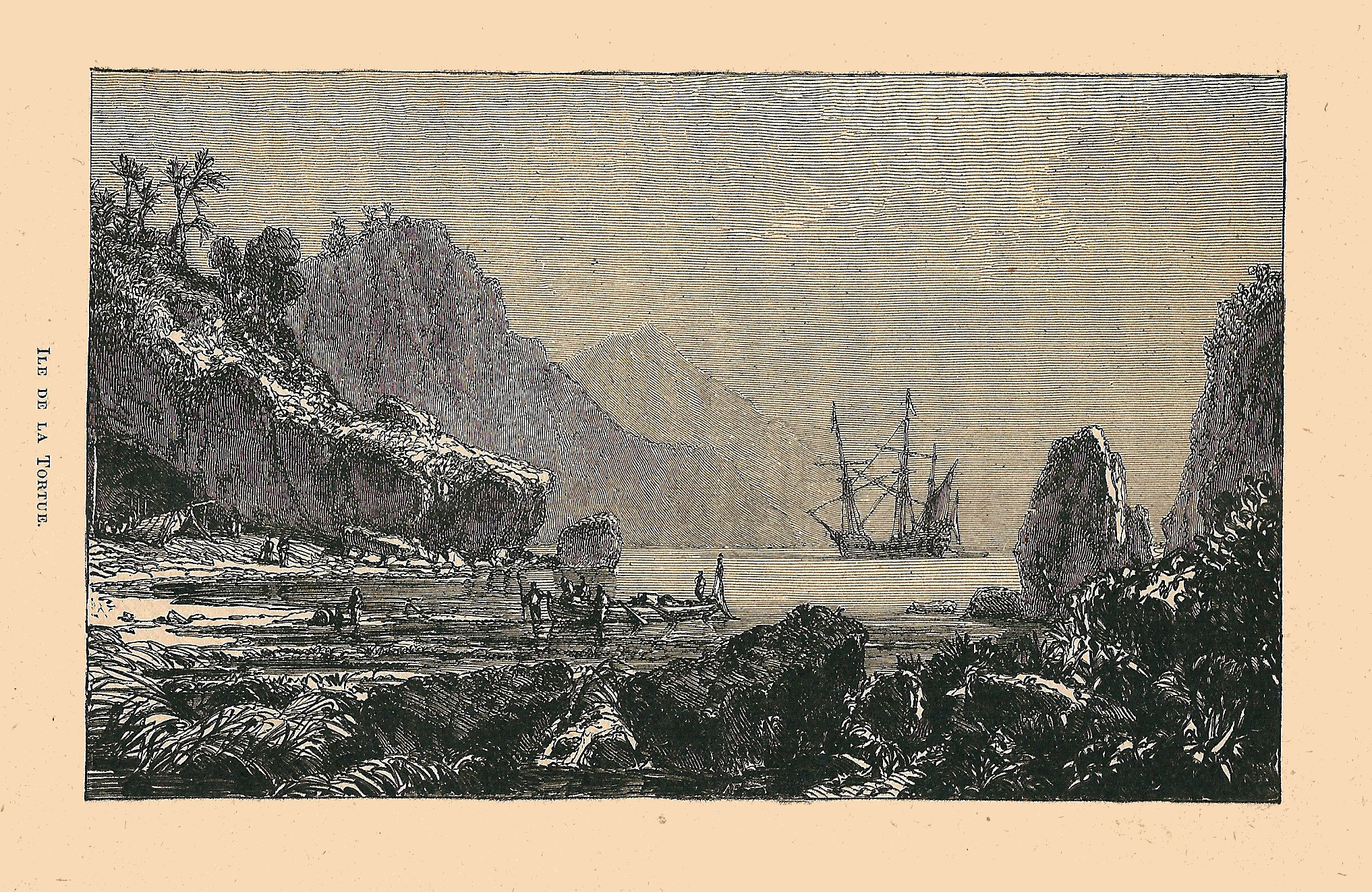
Tortuga Island in colonial times

This is a list of islands of Haiti: Most of The Republic of Haiti is situated on the western portion of Hispaniola, an island which it shares with the Dominican Republic. There are approximately 59 islands in Haiti. The islands are either in the Atlantic Ocean, Gulf of Gonave or Caribbean Sea (see map link). La Navase is disputed between Haiti and the US. Caye Sable is the most densely populated island in the world with up to 250 people sharing an area of just 0.16 ha (0.40 acres)

== Islands ==
Haitian islands include:

Islands of Haiti
Name	Area	Coordinate	
Caye Baice		18°27′N 73°06′W	
Caye à l'Eau			
Caye de l'Est		18°07′42″N 73°35′26″W	
Caye Orange		18°12′55″N 73°32′10″W	
Caye Ramier		18°13′01″N 73°27′46″W	
Caye Sable	0.16 ha (0.40 acres)	18°42′0″N 72°46′0.01″W	
Gonâve Island	690 sq km (266 sq mi)	18°50′29″N 73°02′14″W	
Grosse Caye		18°13′24″N 73°23′56″W	
Hispaniola		19°N 71°W	
Île de Anacaona			
Île Bayau		19°40′54″N 71°51′20″W	
Îlet Boyer		18°04′00″N 73°48′01″W	
Île à Cabrits		18°33′00″N 73°40′00″W	
Ile à Rats			
Île Corny		18°31′10″N 73°39′21″W	
Île du Nord (Ti Teal)			
Île Petite Gonâve			
Île du Phare (Lighthouse Island)			
Île Picoulet		18°32′00″N 73°33′00″W	
Île Pleermantois		18°07′08″N 73°40′01″W	
Île du Sud			
Île-à-Vache (Cow Island)		18°04′20″N 73°38′20″W	
Ilet a Brouee		18°07′42″N 73°35′26″W	
Ilet Grand Goave			
Îlet Limbé		19°48′54″N 72°22′35″W	
Îlet Moustique		18°12′46″N 73°30′57″W	
Îlet Rémy		18°33′00″N 73°41′00″W	
Îlet Saint-Louis		18°15′06″N 73°33′07″W	
Îlot du Fort		18°33′18″N 72°21′04″W	
Isle Cacique		18°41′42″N 72°22′45″W	
Les Cayemites: Grand Cayemite		18°36′53″N 73°45′09″W Petite Cayemite	18°36′36″N 73°48′30″W
Petite Caye		18°05′02″N 73°48′41″W	
Tortuga Island (Turtle Island)	180 sq km (69 sq mi)	20°03′20″N 72°47′33″W	
La Trompeuse		18°15′08″N 73°26′29″W	

== Disputed Territories ==
- Navassa Island, claimed by Haiti but administered by the United States, 18°24′11″N 75°00′43″W

== See also ==
- List of Caribbean islands
- List of islands
