= Malingin Island (Bohol) =

Island of the Philippines

Isla sa Malingin
- Location within Visayas Location within Philippines

Geography
- Coordinates: 10°9′37″N 124°26′31″E
- Archipelago: Philippine
- Adjacent to: Camotes Sea
- Area: 0.11 km^{2} (0.042 sq mi)

Administration
- Philippines
- Region: Central Visayas
- Province: Bohol
- Municipality: Bien Unido
- Barangay: Malingin

Demographics
- Population: 1,567 (2020)
- Pop. density: 14,245/km^{2} (36894/sq mi)
- Ethnic groups: Cebuano

Malingin is an island off the northern coast of Bohol, Philippines. Located in the Camotes Sea, Malingin is under the jurisdiction of the municipality of Bien Unido, Bohol. The island is approximately 7 km (4.3 mi) west-northwest of the port of Bien Unido. Malingin Island is one of the chain of islands situated in the Danajon Bank, the only double barrier reef in the country. Most of the island's residents depend on fishing.

The island was once part of the town of Talibon. In 1980, the municipality of Bien Unido was created through Batas Pambansa no. 93. Malingin became separated from Talibon and became part of the newly formed municipality.

The estimated population of Malingin is 1,567, as of 2020.

== See also ==
- List of islands by population density
