= Narbagandub Dummad =

Island in Panama

Narvagandub Dummad
- Location within Panama

Geography
- Coordinates: 9°27′40″N 79°1′34″W
- Archipelago: San Blas Islands
- Adjacent to: Caribbean Sea
- Area: 0.02 km^{2} (0.0077 sq mi)

Administration
- Panama
- Indigenous Region: Guna Yala
- Municipality: Narganá

Demographics
- Population: 528 (2010)
- Pop. density: 26,400/km^{2} (68400/sq mi)
- Ethnic groups: Guna

Narvagandub Dummad is an island off the northeast coast of Panama. The Spanish colonizers called this island, Naranjos Grandes or Big Orange Trees. The island is part of the chain of islands named San Blas Islands, which stretches from the east of the Panama Canal up to the border of Colombia. The archipelago is inhabited by the Guna people, a Native American ethnic group that resides in border areas of Panama and northern Colombia. Their language is part of the Chibchan language family

== Demographics ==
Based from the latest census in 2010, the estimated population of Narvagandub Dummad is 528.

== See also ==
- List of islands by population density
- Narasgandub Bipi
