= Manubul Island =

Island in Sulu, Philippines

- Location within Mindanao

Geography
- Coordinates: 5°28′18″N 120°47′58″E
- Archipelago: Sulu
- Adjacent to: Celebes Sea
- Area: 0.13 km^{2} (0.050 sq mi)

Administration
- Philippines
- Region: Bangsamoro
- Province: Sulu
- Municipality: Pandami
- Barangay: North Manubul; South Manubul; Tenga Manubul

Demographics
- Population: 7,644 (2020)
- Pop. density: 58,800/km^{2} (152300/sq mi)
- Ethnic groups: Sama; Tausug

Manubul is a densely populated island in the province of Sulu, Philippines. The island falls under the municipal government of Pandami, Sulu and is part of the chain of islands called the Sulu Archipelago. It is located near the islands of Siasi and Lapak.

Through an Executive Order by President Diosdado Macapagal in 1965, the island, which was once part of Siasi is now under the jurisdiction of Pandami.

== Demographics ==
The inhabitants of the island of Manubul adhere to Islam and are part of the Tausug and the Sama-Bajau ethnic groups. The total population of the island is 7,644. With an estimated land area of merely 0.13 square kilometres (0.050 sq mi), the population density of Manubul is about 58,800/km^{2}.

Here is the population of the barangays of Manubul island according to the recent census.

Barangay	Population (2020)
North Manubul	4,487
South Manubul	2,088
Tenga Manubul	1,069
Total	7,644

== Biodiversity ==
Aside from a variety of fish species that are found near the island, researchers from the Department of Biological Sciences of the Western Mindanao State University have discovered that Manubul Island has a diverse number of echinoderm species. These marine creatures include species of sea urchins, brittle stars, starfish and sea cucumbers. This diversity of echinoderms is due to the island's distinctive feature, where seagrass, mangrove and beach ecosystems are present.

== See also ==
• List of islands by population density
