= Laminusa Island =

Island in Sulu, Philippines

- Location within Mindanao

Geography
- Coordinates: 5°33′3″N 120°55′12″E
- Adjacent to: Celebes Sea
- Area: 0.78 km^{2} (0.30 sq mi)

Administration
- Philippines
- Region: Bangsamoro
- Province: Sulu
- Municipality: Siasi

Demographics
- Population: 12,830 (2020)
- Pop. density: 16,449/km^{2} (42603/sq mi)
- Ethnic groups: Sama; Tausug

Laminusa is an island in the municipality of Siasi, Sulu, Philippines. It is one of the islands of the Sulu Archipelago, a chain of islands between the islands of Mindanao and Borneo.

Most of the residents are engaged in fishing. But, Laminusa is also famous for producing colorful intricate-designed mats made by women weavers.

== Overview ==
Administratively, Laminusa Island is part of the municipality of Siasi. The island is subdivided into the following barangays:

- Kong-Kong Laminusa
- Luuk Laminusa
- Puukan Laminusa
- Tampakan Laminusa
- Tengah Laminusa
- Tong Laminusa

== Geography ==
The island is part of the Sulu Archipelago. It is around 1 km. east from the island of Siasi and has an estimated total land area of 0.78 km^{2}

== Demographics ==
The total population of Laminusa is 12,830. With a relatively small area, the island is regarded as one of the densely populated islands in the Philippines.

Below is the population of the barangays that constitute the island of Laminusa

Barangay	Population (2020)
Kong-Kong Laminusa	1,686
Luuk Laminusa	1,442
Puukan Laminusa	2,328
Tampakan Laminusa	2,862
Tengah Laminusa	1,590
Tong Laminusa	2,922
Total	12,830

== See also ==
- List of islands by population density
