= Mambacayao Gamay Island =

Island

Isla sa Mambacayao Gamay
- Location within Visayas, Philippines Location within Philippines

Geography
- Coordinates: 11°2′0″N 123°35′23″E
- Adjacent to: Visayan Sea; Tañon Strait
- Area: 0.06 km^{2} (0.023 sq mi)

Administration
- Philippines
- Region: Central Visayas
- Province: Bohol
- Municipality: Tubigon
- Barangay: Lipayran

Demographics
- Ethnic groups: Cebuano; Bantayanon

Mambacayao Gamay is an island located in the Visayas, Philippines. The island is part of the Bantayan Island Group. It is situated around 18 km (11 mi) from Bantayan, Cebu and around 23 km (14 mi) from the port of Escalante, Negros Occidental. Mambacayao Gamay is also part of Barangay Lipayran, along with Lipayran Island and Mambacayao Daku Island and under the jurisdiction of the municipality of Bantayan, Cebu. Most of the inhabitants of the islands are fisherfolks. The estimated total area of the island is 0.06 km^{2} (0.023 sq mi) and has a high population density.

== See also ==
- List of islands by population density
