= Ilet a Brouee =

Îlet-à-Brouée
- Island
- Location within Haiti
- Coordinates: 18°07′42″N 73°35′26″W
- Country: Haiti

Area
  - Total: 0.004 km^{2} (0.0015 sq mi)

Population
  - Total: 500
  - Density: 125,000/km^{2} (320,000/sq mi)

Îlet-à-Brouée is a Caribbean island and forms part of Haiti. It lies in the Canal de l'Est strait and it is located north of the Île-à-Vache island. Îlet-à-Brouée is one of the most densely populated islands in the world, with up to 500 people sharing an area of just 0.4 hectares (0.99 acres).

== See also ==
- List of islands of Haiti
