= Naboctot Island =

Island in the Philippines

Isla sa Naboctot
- Location within Visayas

Geography
- Coordinates: 11°51′27″N 123°46′6″E
- Archipelago: Philippine
- Adjacent to: Visayan Sea
- Area: 0.09 km^{2} (0.035 sq mi)

Administration
- Philippines
- Region: Bicol
- Province: Masbate
- Municipality: Placer
- Barangay: Naboctot

Demographics
- Population: 1,358 (2020)
- Pop. density: 15,088/km^{2} (39078/sq mi)
- Ethnic groups: Cebuano; Masbateño

Naboctot is an island barangay of the municipality of Placer, Masbate, Philippines. The island is situated in the Visayan Sea, a sea in between the islands of Cebu, Leyte, Masbate, Negros and Panay. The sea is known for one of the country's major fishing grounds. The residents of Naboctot are mostly fisherfolks. It is becoming a tourist spot for local travelers, because of that, House Bill 8726 was passed by congress in 2019, declaring Naboctot as an ecotourism zone. The island is often times spelled as Nabuctot.

According to the 2020 census, Naboctot's total population is 1,358. The island has an elementary school named Felifranco R. Avenido Sr. Memorial Elementary School and a diesel power plant operated by NAPOCOR.

== See also ==
- List of islands by population density
