= Bungin Island =

Island in Sumbawa Regency, West Nusa Tenggara Province, Indonesia

Bungin Island Pulau Bungin
- Location within Indonesia
- Coordinates: 8°28′38″S 116°59′39″E
- Country: Indonesia
- Province: West Nusa Tenggara
- Regency: Sumbawa

Population
  - Total: 3,400
- Time zone: UTC+8 (WITA)

Bungin Island (Indonesian: Pulau Bungin) is located in Alas District, Sumbawa Regency, West Nusa Tenggara in Indonesia. The island is situated within Bali Sea, 70 kilometers west of the center of Sumbawa Besar district. The island is administratively one of the villages in the district. The island is mostly inhabited by the Bajo people from South Sulawesi, who arrived here more than 200 years ago. During that time they built up with material from the seabed what had been a sandy shoal of an estimated 400 square metres (4,300 sq ft) into an area of around 8.5 hectares (21 acres) where about 3,400 people live, making Pulau Bungin among the densest-populated islands in the world) in pile dwellings shored up with harvested coral stone. Goats are kept on land, and fish are harvested from the surrounding waters with harpoon guns. The island is connected by a causeway to the mainland of the regency. The island is .
