= Santa Cruz del Islote =

Artificial island off the coast of Colombia

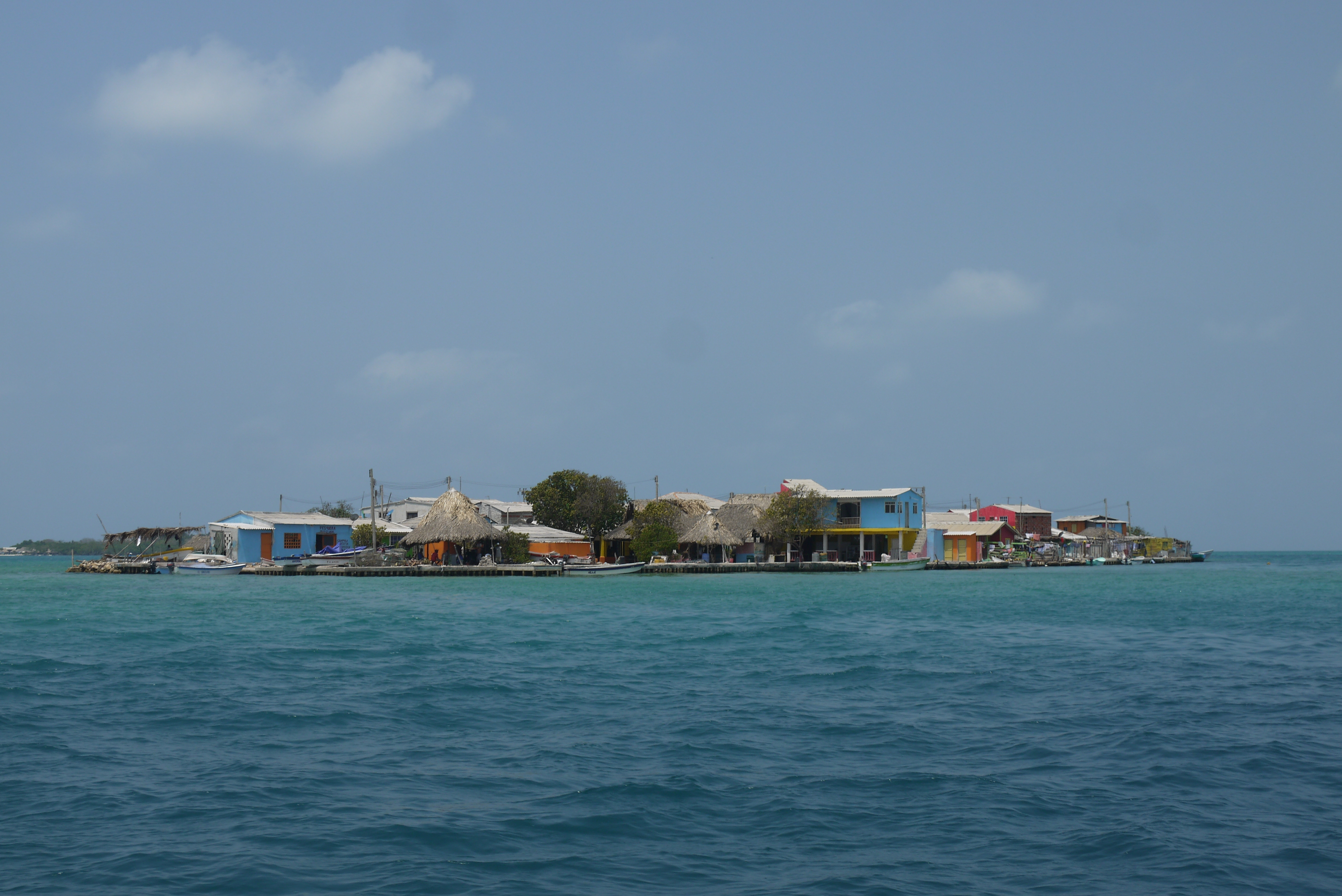

- Location within Islas de San Bernardo Location within Colombia
- Interactive map of Santa Cruz del Islote

Geography
- Location: Caribbean Sea
- Coordinates: 9.7861°N 75.8589°W
- Archipelago: San Bernardo
- Area: 1.2 ha (3.0 acres)
- Length: 200 m (700 ft)
- Width: 120 m (390 ft)

Administration
- Colombia
- Department: Bolívar

Demographics
- Population: 816

Additional information
- Time zone: COT (UTC−05:00)

Santa Cruz del Islote (Spanish for 'Holy Cross of the Islet') is an artificial island located off the coast of Bolívar Department in Colombia, close to Tolú and Coveñas. It is a part of the Archipelago of San Bernardo. Its large population for its size has given it notoriety for supposedly being the most densely populated island on earth; however, estimates of its population vary greatly.

== History ==
The island was uninhabited until the 1860s, when fishermen working around the island from Cartagena and Tolú, Colombia, began to settle on the island to rest and to protect themselves from storms. The first settlers gathered building materials from the sea that were used to further build out the island, including "Sea shells, coconut shells, tree trunks from the neighboring islands, sand, and even garbage". Settlers were attracted to the island not only for its abundance of fish due to the island being surrounded by coral, but also because there were no mosquitoes living on it. Island locals attribute this absence of mosquitoes to a lack of beaches and mangroves on the island.

According to photographer Charlie Cordero, "One day, the tide brought in a cement cross, or 'cruz' in Spanish. The first settlers picked it up and put it in the center of the island. [At the time the island] had no name, but from that day it was called Santa Cruz del Islote."

In 2013, a community council was formed by the residents to discuss local problems. The island and some residences were affected by flooding due to a tidal wave in 2018. At an event held in August 2020, attended by the Minister of Technology (ICT) of the Government of Colombia and the Governor of the Department of Bolívar, a free 24-hour internet service called Zona Digital Rural was established for the island, allowing the residents access to distance education in the midst of the COVID-19 pandemic. Previously, service had been expensive and of poor quality, making it difficult to carry out administrative and educational activities from home.

On 2 July 2021, the island became the first territory in Colombia to be fully vaccinated against the COVID-19 virus.

== Geography ==
A map of Archipelago of San Bernardo. Santa Cruz del Islote is located in the upper-left of the map.

The island has an area of 1.2 hectares (0.012 km^{2}).

== Demographics ==
The population of the island is contested, and the frequently cited figure of 1,247 is likely to be an exaggeration. A census taken in the mid-2010s fixed the population at 492. Another source provides a figure of 779 for the corregimiento of Santa Cruz, which is said to be coterminous with the island. 65 percent of the island's population consists of youth.

The island has 97 to 115 houses and 45 permanent families.

== Government and politics ==
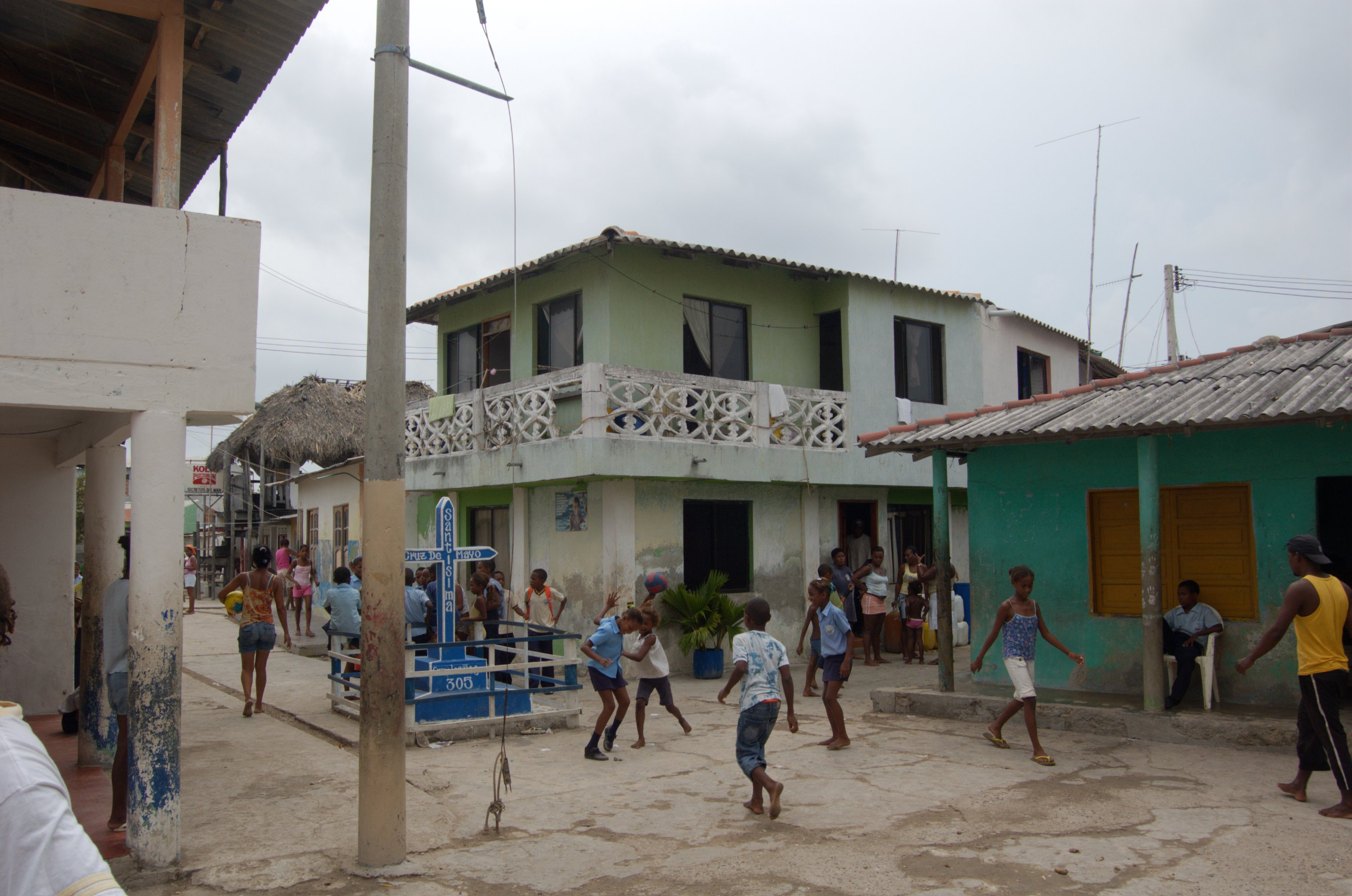
The main street of the island

Due to its small size, the territory is not autonomous. Geographically, it is part of the San Bernardo Archipelago in the Department of Bolívar in northern Colombia and is guarded by the Colombian Navy.

Santa Cruz del Islote is home to a community of Afro-Colombians. The island has a school, a restaurant that is also a port, a health post, and a small island square with a cross. There is a conservation aquarium, which houses turtles, fish, stingrays and small sharks. Much of the island relies on solar panels to generate electricity. There are no police on the island.

Residents of Santa Cruz del Islote are poor and have no toilets or sewage, with clean drinking water, food, and other essentials being imported from overseas. The island also has problems with handling pollution and garbage, although the island has contracted a cleaning company to handle waste management. The island has also made moves towards environmental and recycling programs. Despite these problems, some residents of the island say they do not feel poor, and can live within their means as they do not have big expenses.

The economy of the island is centered on fishing, as well as services such as cooking, cleaning, and tourism guides. Children in particular are taught to fish and swim from a young age. According to The Guardian, the island has "an active street life: groups of children run freely, play traditional street games, and dreadlocked and tattooed teenagers listen to Spanish-language rap at full volume while adults sit in the shade, talking about boxing and preparing food."

== See also ==
- Caribbean region of Colombia
- Insular region of Colombia
- List of islands of South America
- List of islands by population density
