= List of elected politicians in the British Virgin Islands =

Since the restoration of democracy in the British Virgin Islands in 1950, only a comparatively small number of persons have been elected to political office. Although elections are held approximately every three or four years, the small size of the legislative body and the tendency to return incumbent politicians has resulted in a relatively small aggregate number.

Prior to the 1967 general election legislators were elected on a non-party basis. However, many persons who were elected in those early elections later went on to form, or stand for, political parties.

In addition to politicians who were elected by popular mandate, various other political positions are filled by appointment. These include:

- The Governor of the British Virgin Islands (Daniel Pruce since 29 January 2024)
- The Attorney General of the British Virgin Islands (Dawn Smith since 1 October 2020)
- The Speaker of the House of Assembly of the British Virgin Islands (Corine George-Massicote since 26 May 2022)
- Prior to 1967, certain members of the Legislative Council (as the House of Assembly was formerly named) were appointed rather than elected.

== List of elected politicians ==
A total of 68 people have been elected to serve in the Legislature of the British Virgin Islands; 58 were men, and ten were women. Of those 68, twenty seven (39.7%) have only served a single term or less.

List of elected politicians in the British Virgin Islands
No.	Name	Year(s) elected	Party (ies)	Offices held	Notes
1.	Anthony, Alban Ulric	1979, 1983	VIP	Deputy Chief Minister (1979–1983), Minister for Communications, Works and Industry (1975–1983)	
2.	Black, Lloyd	1999, 2003	NDP	Minister for Education and Culture (2003–2007)	
3.	Brewley, E. Walwyn	1983, 1986, 1990, 1995	UP, Ind, CCM	Leader of the Opposition (1995–1999), Minister for Communications and Works (1983–1986)	
4.	Brudenell-Bruce, John Charles	1950	None		First/only white person to be elected.
5.	Christian, Archibald	2011, 2015	NDP	Junior Minister (2015–present)	
6.	Christopher, J. Alvin	1995, 1999, 2003, 2007, 2011	VIP, NDP, Ind, PEP	Minister for Communications and Works (1995–2003 and 2005–2006), Deputy Chief Minister (2000–2002), Minister for Natural Resources and Labour (2003–2005)	
7.	Christopher, Delores	2003, 2011, 2015	NDP		Died in office (2018)
8.	Cills, Oliver	1971, 1975, 1979, 1986, 1990, 1995	VIDP, VIP	Minister for Communications and Works (1971–1975 and 1986–1990), Leader of the Opposition (1977–1979), Deputy Chief Minister, Minister for Natural Resources and Labour (1995–1999)	
9.	Dawson, Ivan	1957, 1960, 1963, 1967	UP	Member for Trade and Production (1963–1967), Minister for Natural Resources (1967–1971)	
10.	Dawson, Karl	2023	VIP		
11.	de Castro, Carlton L.E.	1950			Member of the march of 1949.
12.	de Castro, Sharie	2019, 2013	VIP	Minister for Education, Culture, Youth Affairs and Sports (2022-present)	
13.	Fahie, Andrew	1999, 2003, 2007, 2011, 2015, 2019	VIP	Minister for Health, Education and Welfare (2000–2003), Minister for Education and Culture (2007–2011), Premier and Minister for Finance (2019–2022). Resigned in 2022.	
14.	Faulkner, Theodolph H.	1954, 1960			Member of the march of 1949.
15.	Flax, Keith L.	2007	VIP		
16.	Flax-Charles, Shereen	2019	VIP		
17.	Fonseca, Isaac Glanville	1950, 1954, 1957, 1960, 1963, 1967	POP	Member for Works and Communications (1963–1967)	Member of the march of 1949.
18.	Fraser, Earl P.	1983	UP		
19.	Fraser, Julian	1999, 2003, 2007, 2011, 2015, 2019, 2023	VIP, PU	Minister for Communications and Works (2002–2003 and 2007–2011), Minister for Natural Resources and Labour (1999–2002), Leader of the Opposition (2015-2016 and 2022-Present)	
20.	Frett, Alred	1995	VIP	Minister for Health, Education and Welfare (1995–1997)	
21.	George, Reeial	1971, 1995, 1995	VIP		
22.	Harrigan, Elvis J.	2007	VIP		
23.	Henley, A. Austin	1971, 1975	VIDP, UP	Leader of the Opposition (1975–1977)	Died in office (1977)
24.	Hodge, Omar Wallace	1979, 1983, 1986, 1990, 1995, 1999, 2003, 2007	Ind, VIP, IPM, CCM	Minister for Natural Resources and Labour (1986–1988 and 2007–2011)	
25.	Leonard, Edwin Harris	1954			Stepped down in 1955.
26.	Luce Hodge-Smith	2023	VIP		
27.	Lettsome, Terrance Buckley	1963, 1967, 1979, 1983, 1986, 1990, 1995	UP, VIP	Minister for Communications and Works (1967–1971, 1979–1983, 1990–1995)	
28.	Maduro, Conrad Antonio	1971, 1983, 1986, 1995	UP	Minister for Natural Resources, Public Health and Labour (1972–1975), Leader of the Opposition (1988–1990)	
29.	Maduro-Caines, Alvera	2011, 2015, 2019	NDP		
30.	Malone, Carvin	2019	VIP		
31.	Malone, Leslie Franklin	1954, 1957, 1960		Member for Trade and Production (1957–1960)	
32.	Malone, Vernon	2007	VIP		
33.	Mather, Stacey	2023	PVIM	Deputy Speaker (2023–present)	
34.	O'Neal, Hubert	2015	NDP		
35.	O'Neal, H. Robinson	1967	VIDP		Died in office.
36.	O'Neal, Ralph Telford	1975, 1979, 1983, 1986, 1990, 1995, 1999, 2003, 2007, 2011	VIDP, Ind, UP, VIP	Chief Minister (1995–2003) and Premier (2007–2011). Leader of the Opposition (1983–1988, 2003–2007 and 2011-2014). Various Ministerial posts.	Longest serving member of Legislative Council / House of Assembly (39 years, 280 days)
37.	O'Neal, Waldo E.	1957			
38.	Osborne, Qwominer William	1963, 1967, 1971, 1975	VIDP, VIP	Leader of the Opposition (1967–1971), Minister for Natural Resources and Public Health (1971–1972)	
39.	Parsons, Eileene L.	1995, 1999, 2003	Ind, VIP, NDP	Minister for Natural Resources and Labour (2005–2007), Minister for Health, Education and Welfare (1997–2000), Deputy Chief Minister (1999–2000)	Joint first woman elected. First female minister.
40.	Penn, Andre	1995	UP		
41.	Penn, Howard Reynold	1950, 1954, 1957, 1960		Member for Trade and Production (1954–1957 and 1960–1963)	
42.	Penn, Marlon	2011, 2015, 2019, 2023	NDP	Junior Minister (2015–2019), Leader of the Opposition (2019-2022), Minister for Health and Social Development (2022-present)	
43.	Penn, Ruth Dancia	2007	VIP	Deputy Premier (2007–2011), Minister for Health and Social Development (2007–2011)	
44.	Penn-O'Neal, Irene	2007	VIP		
45.	Kedrick Pickering	1999, 2003, 2007, 2011, 2015	NDP	Deputy Premier (2011–20??)	
46.	Romney, Cyril	1979, 1983, 1986, 1990	Ind	Chief Minister (1983–1986), Leader of the Opposition (1990–1993)	
47.	Rymer, Kye	2019, 2023	VIP	Minister for Transportation, Works and Utilities (2019-present)	
48.	Scatliffe, Arnando	1963	POP, VIP		
49.	Scatliffe, Vincent	2007	VIP		
50.	Skelton, Ronnie	1999, 2003, 2011, 2015, 2023	NDP	Deputy Chief Minister (2003–2007), Minister of Finance (2003–2007), Minister for Health (2003–2007 and 2011–present)	
51.	Smith, Angel	1995 by-election	VIP		
52.	Smith, Daniel Orlando	1999, 2003, 2007, 2011, 2015	NDP	Chief Minister (2003–2007) and Premier (2011-present), Leader of the Opposition (1999–2003 and 2007–2011), Minister for Tourism (2003–2007), Minister of Finance (2011–present)	
53.	Smith, Ethlyn E.	1995, 1999	Ind, CCM, VIP		Joint first woman to be elected
54.	Smith, Leopold E.	1967	UP		
55.	Smith, Lorna	2023	NDP		
56.	Smith, Neville	2019	VIP		
57.	Smith, Wilfred Wilson	1954		Member for Works and Communications (1954–1957)	
58.	Stoutt, Elmore	2005 by-election	NDP	Minister for Communications and Works (2006–2007)	
59.	Stoutt, Hamilton Lavity	1957, 1960, 1963, 1967, 1971, 1975, 1979, 1983, 1986, 1990, 1995	UP, VIP	Five terms as Chief Minister (1967–1971, 1979–1983, 1986–1995). Leader of the Opposition (1971–1975 and 1983–1986). Various Ministerial posts.	Highest number of election victories (11). Died in office (1995).
60.	Stoutt, Prince MacDonald	1977 by-election, 1979, 1990	VIP		
61.	Turnbull, Melvin M.	2015, 2019, 2023	NDP, PVIM	Minister for Natural Resources, Labour and Immigration (2022-present)	
62.	Vanterpool, Mark	1999, 2003, 2011, 2015, 2019	NDP, VIP	Minister for Communications and Works (2011–present)	
63.	Walters, C. Louis	1986, 1990	VIP	Minister for Health, Education and Welfare (1986–1995)	
64.	Walwyn, Myron	2011, 2015, 2023	NDP	Minister for Education (2011–2019)	
65.	Wattley, Paul	2003	NDP	Minister for Communications and Works (2003–2005)	Died in office (2005).
66.	Wheatley, Natalio	2019, 2023	VIP	Premier and Minister of Finance (2022-present)	
67.	Wheatley, Willard	1971, 1975, 1979, 1983	Ind, VIDP, UP, Other	Two terms as Chief Minister (1971–1979), Minister for Education (1971–1979), Minister for Finance (1975–1979), Minister for Health, Education and Welfare (1983–1986), Leader of the Opposition (1979–1983)	
68.	Wheatley, Vincent	2019, 2023	VIP		
Main parties Concerned Citizen's Movement (CCM); BVI United Party (UP); Independent People's Movement (IPM); National Democratic Party (NDP); People's Own Party (POP); Positive Virgin Islands Movement (PVIM); Progressives United (PU); VI Democratic Party (VIDP); Virgin Islands Party (VIP)

== Longest serving elected politicians ==
Twelve people (all men) have served five or more terms in the British Virgin Islands Legislature.

Longest serving politicians in the British Virgin Islands
Number of Terms	Name	Years elected	Notes
11	H. Lavity Stoutt	1957, 1960, 1963, 1967, 1971, 1975, 1979, 1983, 1986, 1990, 1995	Five terms as Chief Minister.
10	Ralph T. O'Neal	1975, 1979, 1983, 1986, 1990, 1995, 1999, 2003, 2007, 2011	Three terms as Chief Minister/Premier. Includes one uncontested election.
8	Omar W. Hodge	1979, 1983, 1986, 1990, 1995, 1999, 2003, 2007	
7	Terrance B. Lettsome	1963, 1967, 1979, 1983, 1986, 1990, 1995	Includes two uncontested elections.
7	Julian Fraser	1999, 2003, 2007, 2011, 2015, 2019, 2023	
6	Oliver Cills	1971, 1975, 1979, 1986, 1990, 1995	Includes two uncontested elections.
6	Isaac G. Fonseca	1950, 1954, 1957, 1960, 1963, 1967	
6	Andrew Fahie	1999, 2003, 2007, 2011, 2015, 2019	
5	J. Alvin Christopher	1995, 1999, 2003, 2007, 2011	
5	Kedrick Pickering	1999, 2003, 2007, 2011, 2015	
5	Orlando Smith	1999, 2003, 2007, 2011, 2015	Three terms as Chief Minister/Premier.
5	Mark Vanterpool	1999, 2003, 2011, 2015, 2019	

== See also ==
- List of political parties in the British Virgin Islands
