= List of political parties in the British Virgin Islands =

The British Virgin Islands has a two-party system, which means that there are two dominant political parties, creating difficulty for anybody to achieve electoral success under the banner of any other party. In none of the previous four elections has a candidate who was not standing for any party other than one of the two main parties won a seat (although one candidate has won running as an independent). Prior to 1999 there were a number of multi-party elections with four or more parties contesting and three or more parties winning seats.

== Active parties ==
There are four main parties active at present in the Territory, and between them they hold all of the seats in the legislature. Two of them were formed in 2018, the other two are much older.

Party	Founded	Leader	Notes
Virgin Islands Party	1971	Natalio Wheatley	Current ruling party. General election victories in 1979, 1986, 1990, 1995, 1999, 2007, and 2019
National Democratic Party	1999	Marlon Penn	Current main opposition party. General election victories in 2003, 2011, and 2015
Progressive Virgin Islands Movement	2018	Ronnie Skelton	

== Defunct parties ==
Several parties have previously held seats in the British Virgin Islands legislature but are no longer current or active.

Party	Comments
United Party	General election victories in 1967, 1975 and 1983. Last candidate elected was Andre Penn in 1995. Last candidate to stand was Conrad Maduro in a 2005 by-election.
VI Democratic Party	Won the 1971 general election (together with Willard Wheatley (Ind)). Contested each general election from 1967 to 1979 except for 1975. Formed main opposition party after 1967 general election. Last won seats in 1971 (three candidates). Last candidate to stand was Q.W. Osborne in 1979.
People's Own Party	Never won a general election. Only contested the 1967 general election, winning one seat.
Independent People's Movement	Put forward two candidates in the 1990 general election; one was elected (Omar Hodge). No other electoral appearances.
Progressives United	Never won a general election. Put forward four candidates in the 2019 general election, winning one seat.

== Unelected parties ==
A number of political parties have been formed but failed to win any seats. Only one of these parties has ever contested more than a single election (one of the parties named the Concern Citizen Movement contested two general elections; an unrelated party also named the Concern Citizen Movement contested a third).

Party	Comments
Virgin Islands Progressive Party	Contested the 1975 general election but failed to win any seats.
Virgin Islands National Movement	Contested the 1979 general election but failed to win any seats.
People's Party	Contested the 1986 general election but failed to win any seats.
Progressive People's Democratic Party	Contested the 1990 general election but failed to win any seats.
Concern Citizen Movement (first incarnation)	Contested the 1995 general election and 1999 general election but failed to win any seats.
Concern Citizen Movement (second incarnation - unrelated)	Contested the 2007 general election but failed to win any seats.
People's Patriotic Alliance	Contested the 2011 general election but failed to win any seats.
Party of the People	Contested the 2011 general election but failed to win any seats.
People's Empowerment Party	Formed by sitting member of the House, Alvin Christopher and contested the 2015 general election but failed to win any seats.
People's Coalition Movement	Contested the 2015 general election but failed to win any seats.

== Electoral history of main parties ==
History of the political parties who have won at least one seat at a general election.

Party	Elections contested	Elections won
Virgin Islands Party	13; 1971 - 2019	7; 1979, 1986, 1990, 1995, 1999, 2007, 2019
United Party	9; 1967 - 2003	3; 1967, 1975, 1983
National Democratic Party	6; 1999 - 2019	3; 2003, 2011, 2015
VI Democratic Party	3; 1967, 1971, 1979	1; 1971
People's Own Party	1; 1967	0
Independent People's Movement	1; 1990	0
Positive Virgin Islands Movement	1; 2019	0
Progressives United	1; 2019	0

== See also ==
- Lists of political parties
