= Terrance B. Lettsome =

Virgin Islander politician (1935–2007)

The Honourable Terrance B. Lettsome

Member of Legislative Council
- In office 28 November 1963 – 2 June 1971
- Monarch: Elizabeth II
- Preceded by: Leslie F. Malone
- Succeeded by: Willard Wheatley
- In office 12 November 1979 – 17 May 1999
- Preceded by: Willard Wheatley
- Succeeded by: Kedrick Pickering

Personal details
- Born: 28 August 1944 Tortola, British Virgin Islands
- Died: 12 January 2007 (aged 62) Tortola, British Virgin Islands
- Party: United Party, Virgin Islands Party
- Spouse: Claudia Lettsome (nee Frett)

Terrance Buckley Lettsome (11 March 1935 – 12 January 2007) was a politician after whom the main airport in the British Virgin Islands (BVI) is named. Born in Long Look to Francis Henry and Frances Lettsome, he was one of the territory's longest-serving legislators and the ninth of 11 children.

He married the former Claudia Frett, a retired school principal, and was the father of four children, Bertrand Lettsome, Baines Bradley Lettsome (deceased), Brenda Lettsome-Tye and Constance Scatliffe. (Bertrand was the BVI government's Chief Conservation and Fisheries Officer.) Lettsome received his early education at Long Look Infant School and East End Methodist School. Lettsome became a Methodist preacher in 1956. He also worked as a fisherman, farmer, photographer, contractor and entrepreneur, both locally and overseas.

Lettsome was first elected to the Legislative Council on 4 November 1963. During that first term he, along with Lavity Stoutt and Ivan Dawson, formed the United Party. On 14 April 1967, he was re-elected to the legislature under the ministerial system and appointed the first Minister of Communications, Works and Utilities. He was one of the few legislators who served consecutive terms after the inception of the ministerial system. He retired in 1999 after 36 years of uninterrupted service to the 7th District.

Major changes that took place during his tenure include the building of multipurpose community centres, the establishment of police stations on all major islands, the provision of electricity and potable water, the development of ports at West End, Port Purcell and Road Town, the completion of the Central Administration Complex and sea defense work on Drake's Highway.

As a tribute to his outstanding record of service, in February 2001, the Legislative Council voted to rename Beef Island Airport in his honour.

In an interview with The Virgin Islands Daily News, Opposition Leader Ralph T. O'Neal referred to Lettsome as "a great soldier". He said Lettsome was a man who believed in his people and in the territory. "He always wanted to be, in his spare time, at a place called The Sticket in Long Look, where he met his people, talked with them and exchanged good times with them," said O'Neal, who worked with Lettsome as Clerk of the Legislative Council and later as an elected representative and a member of the Virgin Islands Party.

Lettsome, affectionately called T. B., was an accredited local preacher in the Long Look Methodist Church, where he regularly attended services, Bible studies and prayer meetings. He considered himself "God's servant" and led many persons to Christ over the course of his life.

Lettsome died on 12 January 2007 after a prolonged illness. The Chief Minister, Orlando Smith, joined in mourning Lettsome, whom he called a great statesman who served his country well. "He was also very committed to his district and did considerable work there. He was a tenacious legislator, but he was also concerned with the country and the good of his party," Smith said.

His body lay-in-state at the Legislative Council Chamber in Road Town on 19 January 2007, after which the flag covering the coffin was presented to his widow by the Commissioner of Police in a formal ceremony. His body was buried on 20 January 2007 at the Lettsome Family Burial Ground following a Royal Homegoing Service at the Long Look Methodist Church.

== Electoral history ==
Terrance B. Lettsome electoral history
Year	District	Party	Votes	Percentage	Winning/losing margin	Result
1963	4th District	Non-party election	--	--	--	Won
1967	6th District	BVI United Party	229	57.7%	+61	Won
1971	6th District	Virgin Islands Party	--	--	--	Lost; W. Wheatley
1975	6th District	Virgin Islands Party	286	47.3%	-33	Lost; W. Wheatley
1979	7th District	Virgin Islands Party	Unopposed			Won
1983	7th District	Virgin Islands Party	Unopposed			Won
1986	7th District	Virgin Islands Party	227	74.9%	+154	Won
1990	7th District	Virgin Islands Party	210	50.1%	+76	Won
1995	7th District	Virgin Islands Party	259	68.3%	+155	Won

Political offices
Preceded by Earl P. Fraser	Deputy Speaker of the House of Assembly; 1986–1990	Succeeded by Oliver Cills
