= Conrad Maduro =

British Virgin Islander politician

Conrad Antonio Maduro (born 1 December 1935) is a British Virgin Islander politician and longtime leader of the United Party. Remarkably, Conrad Maduro has led his party to victory at three different general elections, but has never been appointed Chief Minister.

- In the 1967 general election, Maduro as president led the United Party to victory, but lost his individual seat to Isaac Glanville Fonseca. As he was not elected, Lavity Stoutt was appointed Chief Minister in his stead. In the subsequent 1971 general election, Maduro would win his seat, but the United Party lost power.
- In the 1975 general election, the United Party once again won the general election, but Maduro lost his seat. However, as the party formed a coalition with Willard Wheatley, the incumbent Chief Minister, it is highly unlikely Maduro would have been appointed Chief Minister even if he had won.
- In the 1983 general election, the United Party won the general election, and Maduro won his seat. However, the party again needed to form a coalition, and formed it with Cyril Romney with Cyril Romney becoming Chief Minister.

Maduro has contested more general elections in the British Virgin Islands than any other politician except for Lavity Stoutt and Ralph T. O'Neal, contesting ten general elections between (and including) the 1967 general election and the 2003 general election, winning four times. Including by-elections, Conrad Maduro has contested 11 elections in total; equaling the record held jointly by Lavity Stoutt and Ralph O'Neal.

Whereas politics in the British Virgin Islands is normally characterised by leading politicians crossing the floor, during his political career Maduro was unusual in remaining steadfastly loyal to the United Party.

After the 1983 general election, he formed part of the coalition government and served as Minister for Natural Resources and Public Health. He also performed the same Ministerial role as an opposition politician between 1972 and 1975 when Dr Q.W. Osborne was removed from his ministerial post in 1972.

In 1986, he won election in the 2nd District over Prince Stoutt by just a single vote, which is tied for the record for the narrowest margin of victory in a British Virgin Islands election. His victory with just 92 votes is also a record for the smallest number of votes for a victorious candidate.

From 1988 to 1990, he served as the Leader of the Opposition in the Legislative Council of the British Virgin Islands.

== Political comeback ==
In June 2014 Maduro announced his desire to return the United Party to political prominence, and confirmed that if selected as a candidate he would run in the next general election. If he did so then he would contest his 12th election in the British Virgin Islands, breaking the tie he presently holds with Lavity Stoutt and Ralph O'Neal for the most general elections contested. Ultimately however he did not end up contesting the 2015 general election.

== Electoral history ==
Conrad Maduro electoral history
Year	District	Party	Votes	Percentage	Winning/losing margin	Result
1967	5th District	BVI United Party	151	43.6%	-44	Lost; I. Fonseca
1971	5th District	BVI United Party	--	--	--	Won
1975	5th District	BVI United Party	246	43.2%	-77	Lost; Q.W. Osborne
1979	6th District	BVI United Party	178	48.0%	-19	Lost; O. Hodge
1983	2nd District	BVI United Party	148	52.9%	+19	Won
1986	2nd District	BVI United Party	92	38.2%	+1	Won
1990	2nd District	BVI United Party	77	21.4%	-122	Lost; P. Stoutt
1995	At-large	BVI United Party	1,618	8.3%	+183*	Won (2nd)
1999	At-large	BVI United Party	723	3.02%	-1,751*	Lost
2003	At-large	BVI United Party	590	2.02%	-2,725*	Lost
2005 by-election	At-large	BVI United Party	144	2.91%	-2,426	Lost; E. Stoutt
* For at-large candidates (general elections) who won, this is the vote differential from the 5th placed candidate (i.e. the candidate with the highest number of votes who was not elected). For at-large candidates who lose, this is the vote differential from the 4th placed candidate (i.e. the candidate with the lowest number of votes who was elected).

== Political office ==
Political offices
Preceded by Ralph O'Neal	Leader of the Opposition; 1988–1990	Succeeded by Cyril Romney
