= Isaac Glanville Fonseca =

British Virgin Islands politician

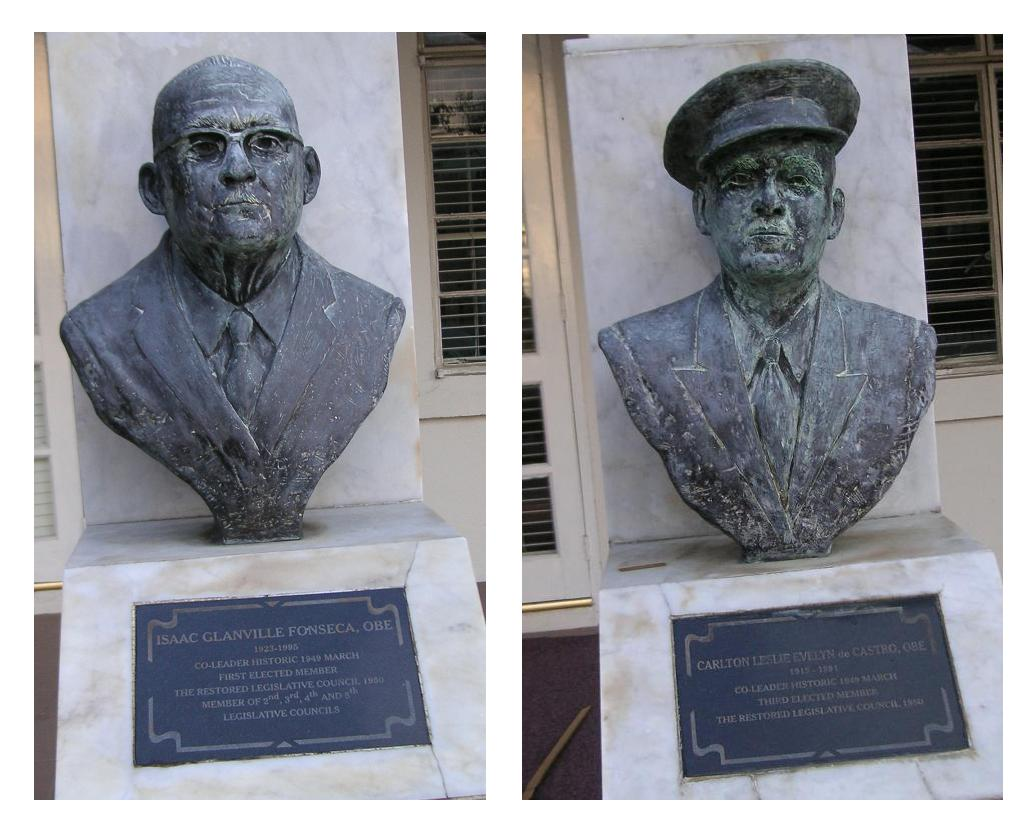
The busts of Isaac Fonseca and Carlton de Castro outside of the House of Assembly.

Isaac Glanville Fonseca OBE was a British Virgin Islands political figure around the time of the restoration of democracy in 1950. Fonseca was one of the community leaders who participated in the "march of 1949" and later went on to become one of the longest serving legislators in the British Virgin Islands, winning a total of six general elections before retiring from politics.

== The march of 1949 ==
In 1949 an unlikely political hero emerged in the British Virgin Islands. Theodolph H Faulkner was a fisherman from Anegada, who came to Tortola with his pregnant wife. He had a disagreement with the medical officer, and he went straight to the marketplace and for several nights criticised the government with mounting passion. His oratory struck a chord, and a movement started. Led by community leaders such as Isaac Fonseca and Carlton de Castro, a throng of over 1,500 British Virgin Islanders marched on the Administrator's office on 24 November 1949 and presented their grievances.

This led directly to the enacting of a new constitution for the Territory under which the first general election was held in 1950. Four candidates were elected on a Territory wide basis to serve on the new Legislative Council alongside two appointed members, two ex officio members, and the Administrator of the British Virgin Islands. Isaac Fonseca was amongst the four candidates elected, and a bust memorialising him and the other inaugural legislators stands outside of the House of Assembly.

== Political career ==
Between 1950 and 1967 elections were conducted on a non-party basis, and the Legislative Council functioned as a collection of wise men for the better guidance of the Territory. At each such general election Isaac Fonseca stood, and at each such election he was voted back in. Although these early Legislative Councils did not appoint ministers of government, from 1954 certain members were allocated ministerial type responsibilities and between 1957 and 1960 Fonseca was the Member for Works and Communications (he may also have held the same post between 1954 and 1957, but the record is unclear).

In 1967 further constitutional change occurred which introduced Ministerial Government and party politics into the British Virgin Islands. The legislators duly banded into political parties, and Fonseca became the head of the newly created People's Own Party. However in the 1967 general election, although Fonseca himself won his seat, it was the only seat his party would win in the seven member Legislative Council, consigning his party to third place behind the BVI United Party and the VI Democratic Party. Fonseca ran again in the 1971 general election, but was defeated by Q. William Osborne. He ran again in 1975, and lost, and then retired from politics.

== Electoral history ==
I.G. Fonseca electoral history
Year	District	Party	Votes	Percentage	Winning/losing margin	Result
1950	At-large	Non-party election	--	--	--	Won
1954	2nd District	Non-party election	--	--	--	Won
1957	2nd District	Non-party election	--	--	--	Won
1960	2nd District	Non-party election	--	--	--	Won (1st)
1963	2nd District	Non-party election	442	35.4%	+232*	Won (1st)
1967	5th District	People's Own Party	195	56.4%	+69	Won
1971	4th District	People's Own Party	--	--	--	Lost; Q.W. Osborne
1975	4th District	Independent	60	12.4%	-228	Lost; A.Anthony
* Two members are elected for the second district. Margin of victory is measured against third placed candidate.
