= Eileene Parsons =

British Virgin Islander politician (1930–2025)

Eileene Parsons OBE

Deputy Chief Minister
- In office 21 May 1999 – 20 July 2000
- Monarch: Elizabeth II
- Prime Minister: Ralph T. O'Neal
- Governor: Frank Savage

Minister of Health, Education and Welfare
- In office 25 February 1997 – 20 July 2000
- Monarch: Elizabeth II
- Prime Minister: Ralph T. O'Neal
- Governor: David Mackilligin

Member of the House of Assembly of the British Virgin Islands
- In office 6 March 1995 – 20 August 2007
- Monarch: Elizabeth II
- Prime Minister: Ralph T. O'Neal
- Governor: David Mackilligin

Personal details
- Born: Eileene Lucia Stevens; 5 July 1930 Tortola, British Virgin Islands
- Died: 22 June 2025 (aged 94) Road Town, British Virgin Islands
- Party: National Democratic Party
- Children: One son, one daughter
- Parents: James Elmore Stevens (father); Virginia Parrott Fahie (mother)
- Education: State University of New York at Oswego; University of the Virgin Islands; Florida International University

Eileene Lucia Parsons OBE, née Stevens (5 July 1930 – 22 June 2025) was a British Virgin Islander politician who served as a member of the House of Assembly of the British Virgin Islands, including as Minister for of Health, Education and Welfare, Deputy Premier and Deputy Speaker during the course of her political career. She was one of the first women ministers and the first deputy speaker of that government. In local press, she is frequently referred to as being a "cultural icon" for her work with the BVI Heritage Dance Company and other local cultural groups.

== Background ==
Eileen Parsons was born to Virginia Parrott Fahie and James Elmore Stevens on Tortola in the British Virgin Islands, but some time later she went to live with her mother's sister Constancia Parrott. She and her aunt moved to St Thomas where she attended Charlotte Amalie High School.

Parsons's higher education continued in Puerto Rico where she earned a diploma in dressmaking and attended Oswego State Teachers College (now State University of New York at Oswego) where she studied Industrial Arts and Spanish. Parsons also trained at the Leeward Islands Teachers College and took an associate degree at the University of the Virgin Islands. At the Florida International University, she studied for a bachelor's degree in tourism promotion.

Parsons died at a hospital in Road Town, on 22 June 2025, at the age of 94.

== Work ==
Parsons worked as a teacher in the British Virgin Islands between 1959–65, then for the next thirty years as the secretary to the Commissioner of Education for the Islands, along with the Dean of the University of the Virgin Islands, and the Tourist Board. In her spare time, she was involved with a number of cultural and sporting initiatives as well as writing for the local paper and co-writing a book on the history of the performing arts.

Parsons also served as Cultural Officer from 1984-1989 and has been active in culture and sports. She founded the Community Singers and the BVI Heritage Dance Company. She has also written extensively for publication in local newspapers and co-authored the book 1834 - 1984 - One Hundred and Fifty years of Achievement and Development through the Performing Arts.

She also chaired the BVI's Festival Committee from 1975-83.

== Politics ==
Parsons contested the elections in 1983, 1986 and 1990 but it was not until the British Virgin Islands general election in 1995 she was finally successful as an independent candidate. This made her the second woman to enter the House of Assembly. She joined the opposition for five years and then joined the Virgin Islands Party and sat on the Government back benches for another two. In 1997, she became the Minister of Health, Education and Welfare, the first time a woman had been appointed a minister in the British Virgin Islands. She became deputy premier two years later. She stood again at the 1999 elections and became the deputy Chief Minister as well as continuing at the Ministry of Health, Education and Welfare until 2000.

At the next election, she stood for the National Democratic Party and became Deputy Speaker.

By 2014, she was considered a cultural icon on the island. That year, she chaired a committee to recognise those who had contributed to the BVI. Her views continued to be sought after she had retired from politics, with her expressing a lack of interest in the prospect of the British Virgin Islands' potential independence from the United Kingdom.

== Honours and recognition ==
Parsons was named an Officer of the Order of the British Empire (OBE) in the 2013 Birthday Honours list for "services to education and to the community in the British Virgin Islands".

The Eileene L. Parsons Auditorium at the H. Lavity Stoutt Community College was named in honour of Parsons.

== Comments ==
After her retirement Parsons occasionally came into the public eye in relation to controversial comments that she made. In January 2015, she reportedly cursed at Andrew Fahie, the House of Assembly member for the 1st district, and then refused to apologise. In February 2016, in response to a question about a reported 137% budget overrun on public project which had been the subject of much public criticism, she suggested that this was normal and it should not be a source of concern.

== Electoral history ==
Eileene L. Parsons electoral history
Year	District	Party	Votes	Percentage	Winning/losing margin	Result
1983	5th District	Independent	154	33.2%	-33	Lost; C. Romney
1986	5th District	Independent	158	36.2%	-26	Lost; C. Romney
1990	5th District	Independent	254	39.2%	-47	Lost; C. Romney
1995	At-large	Independent	1,675	8.59%	+240*	Won (1st)
1999	At-large	Virgin Islands Party	2,288	9.56%	+631*	Won (4th)
2003	At-large	National Democratic Party	3,515	11.35%	+241*	Won (3rd)
* For at-large candidates (general elections) who won, this is the vote differential from the 5th placed candidate (i.e. the candidate with the highest number of votes who was not elected). For at-large candidates who lose, this is the vote differential from the 4th placed candidate (i.e. the candidate with the lowest number of votes who was elected).
