= Omar Hodge =

British Virgin Islands politician (1942-2017)

Omar Wallace Hodge (2 February 1942 – 20 December 2017) was a politician in the British Virgin Islands. Hodge was the third longest serving member of the House of Assembly (including its former incarnation as the Legislative Council) after Lavity Stoutt and Ralph O'Neal. Hodge served continuously as the representative for the 6th District from his election in the 1979 general election until his surprise defeat in the 2011 general election. He served a total of 31 years, 360 days. He elected not to contest the 2015 general election.

Hodge was a longstanding member of the Virgin Islands Party (VIP), and six of the nine general elections which he contested had been as a VIP candidate. Although he started his career as an independent candidate, he subsequently joined the VIP, but later split from them and contested the 1990 general election on behalf of a newly created party, the Independent People's Movement (which was disbanded shortly thereafter), and the 1995 general election on behalf of the Concerned Citizen's Movement, before later rejoining the VIP.

Hodge twice served as Minister for Natural Resources and Labour (from 1986–1988 and then again from 2007–2011). On each occasion, he was a member of Cabinet.

Hodge died on 20 December 2017 after a stroke, at the age of 75.

== Controversy ==
In 2014, Hodge was part of the controversy relating to the greenhouse project at Paraquita Bay. The Auditor General issued a damning report, which indicated that there was no comprehensive budget for the project, which led to requests for supplementary and over-expenditure on approved amounts. The report also noted that the Ministry of Natural Resources and Labour signed a binding contract with a Florida-based company for the greenhouse construction before even preliminary issues had been assessed. The Auditor General grimly noted that not a single crop had been reaped from the greenhouses even though US$6 million had been spent. The report concluded that the project "failed to meet any of the stipulated objectives".

Critically, the auditors discovered a conflict of interest regarding an estimated $757,301.57 in no-bid contracts paid to the locally based firm Mirsand Town Planning and Architects Ltd., a firm owned by Jose and Sandra Camilo, who are brother- and sister-in-law to Omar Hodge, who conceived and oversaw the entire project. Hodge denied conflicts of interest, saying that the Florida-based construction company selected Mirsand without reference to him.

== Electoral history ==
Omar Hodge electoral history
Year	District	Party	Votes	Percentage	Winning/losing margin	Result
1979	6th District	Independent	197	52.0%	+19	Won
1983	6th District	Virgin Islands Party	279	54.9%	+50	Won
1986	6th District	Virgin Islands Party	294	63.4%	+129	Won
1990	6th District	Independent People's Movement	306	47.3%	+136	Won
1995	6th District	Concerned Citizen's Movement	270	37.4%	+76	Won
1999	6th District	Virgin Islands Party	367	45.4%	+12	Won
2003	6th District	Virgin Islands Party	489	55%	+226	Won
2007	6th District	Virgin Islands Party	588	67.4%	+236	Won
2011	6th District	Virgin Islands Party	385	38.6%	-227	Lost; A. Maduro-Caines

== Offices ==
Political offices
Preceded by Willard Wheatley	House of Assembly Member, 6th District; 1979-2011	Succeeded by Alvera Maduro-Caines
