= 1950 British Virgin Islands general election =

General elections were held in the British Virgin Islands on 27 November 1950, the first after the decision to restore the Legislative Council of the British Virgin Islands. Four members were elected to the First Legislative Council.

At the time of the election the British Virgin Islands was governed as part of the Leeward Islands and the Legislative Council was constituted under Leeward Islands Act, 1950. After the election a new Constitution of the British Virgin Islands came into effect (the Constitution (Virgin Islands) Act, 1950). The 1950 Constitution was intended to be an interim measure, but several elections were later conducted under it until the 1967 Constitution was promulgated.

== Background ==
The British Virgin Islands had formerly had a Legislative Council, but it had been dissolved in 1901 largely due to lack of interest, and the Territory had been governed directly as part of the Leeward Islands.

But in 1947 a fisherman from Anegada named Theodolph H Faulkner came to Tortola with his pregnant wife. He had a disagreement with the medical officer, and he went straight to the marketplace and for several nights criticised the government with mounting passion. His oratory struck a chord, a march of over 1,500 British Virgin Islanders led by community leaders presented their grievances at the Commissioner's office.

Following on from the march of 1947 the British undertook to organise elections and work towards the restoration of direct rule. In the end it took over three years for elections to occur.

At the time of election, the British Virgin Islands was a heavily underdeveloped country:

In 1950 the BVI was the "backwater" of the West Indies. The [existing political framework] was then grossly underdeveloped, with a population of about 5,000. There was patently little infrastructure such as roads, electricity or water supply; no airfield or deepwater port. Most roads were really tracks and transportation was mainly by mule or horseback. The electricity supply, such as there was, consisted of a small diesel generator principally to service the hospital, Government House and lower Road Town for a six-hour period daily. There were no banks or other financial institutions, no hotels and, simply, no economic base upon which the country could attract foreign investment or capital. The livelihood of the populace depended heavily on agriculture, fishing and cattle raising for export to neighbouring St. Thomas. There was some skilled labour consisting of boatbuilders and tradesmen, but no educated class.

The electoral framework under which the election was conducted was archaic. Voters were required to pass a literacy test, effectively disenfranchising much of the population. Electoral candidates were required, amongst other things, to be landowners in order to stand for election.

== Results ==
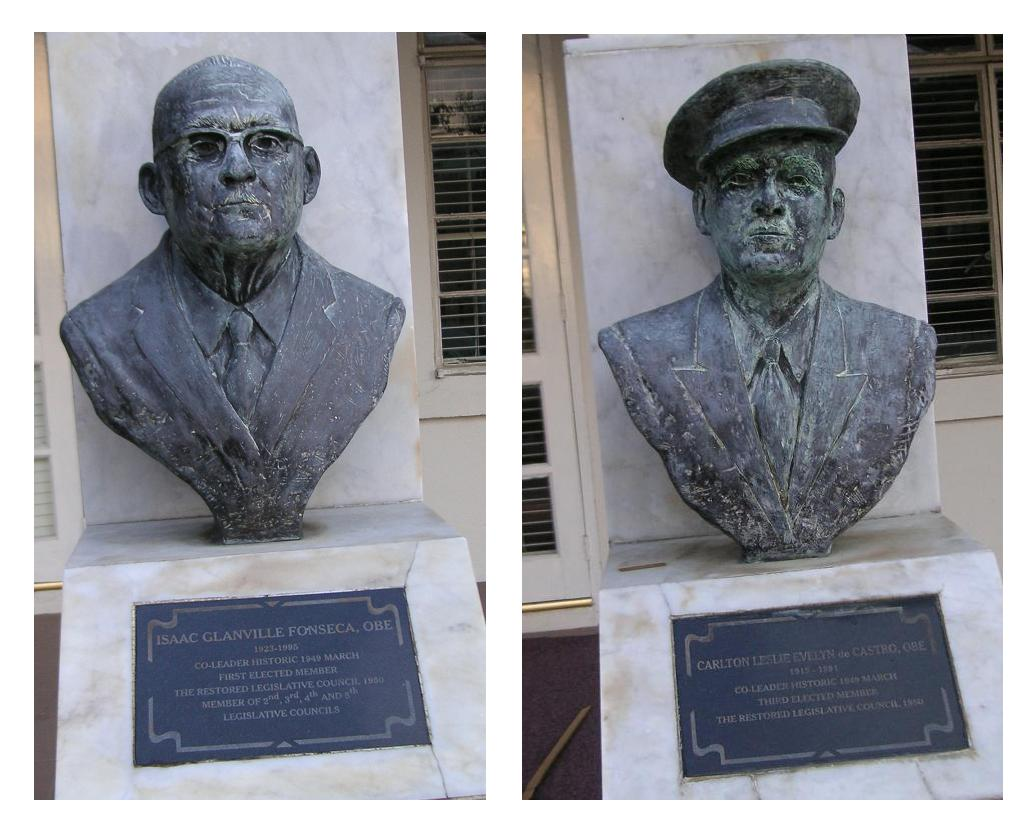
The busts of Isaac Fonseca and Carlton de Castro outside of the Legislative Council building.

The four persons elected to the inaugural Legislative Council were:

1. Isaac Glanville Fonseca
2. H.R. Penn, MBE
3. Carlton L.E. de Castro
4. John Charles Brudenell-Bruce, MBE

There were no political parties in the Territory at the time, nor any system of Ministerial government. Accordingly, whilst the Council had legislative powers they did not have any executive authority, which continued to be administered through the British-appointed Administrator of the British Virgin Islands.

The person whose actions ultimately led to the election, Theodolph Faulkner, was not in fact elected. However, Faulkner would later be elected to the Legislature in the 1954 election and then again in the 1960 election.

Although he would run for election again in the future, Captain Carlton de Castro would only ever serve that one term in the legislature. Brudenell-Bruce never ran for election again, but he served again in the 2nd District when Edwin Leonard stepped down in August 1954 and he was appointed to take the vacant seat. H.R. Penn continued to serve in the legislature until he was beaten decisively in the 1963 general election and declined to run again. He then later served as Speaker of the Legislative Council between 1971 and 1975. Mr Fonseca had the longest political career, and would serve continuously in the legislature until his defeat in the 1971 general election.

== First Legislative Council ==
The four elected members made up a minority of the Legislative Council. The other five members were:

- John Augustus Cockburn Cruikshank, the Administrator of the British Virgin Islands (who was President and Chair)
- Two financial officials (nominated unofficial members):
  - Olva Georges
  - Benjamin Romney
- Two nominated official members:
  - Dr W.T. Joseph
  - A.T. Franklin
