= Qwominer William Osborne =

British Virgin Islander politician and physician

Dr. Qwominer William Osborne, OBE (usually referred to as Q.W. Osborne or William Osborne) was a British Virgin Islander politician and physician.

His political career started in the 1963 general election, when he was elected to the seat for the 5th District. Prior to 1967 elections to the Legislative Council of the British Virgin Islands were on a non-party basis, and legislators who were elected governed collectively.

However, the 1967 general election introduced party politics into the British Virgin Islands, and Osborne founded and became leader of the VI Democratic Party. Ultimately that party would come second in the election to the BVI United Party led by Lavity Stoutt. Osborne thereby became the first ever Leader of the Opposition in the British Virgin Islands.

In the subsequent 1971 general election he led his party to the highest number of overall seats, but short of an outright majority. Faced with potentially ruling as a minority government, he formed a coalition with independent candidate Willard Wheatley. However, Wheatley required that he be made Chief Minister, and Osborne agreed. Osborne was appointed Minister for Natural Resources and Public Health.

The subsequent administration appeared not to be a happy one, possibly driven apart by Osborne's own desire to be Chief Minister. Wheatley removed Osborne from his Ministerial post in 1972. The VI Democratic Party splintered, and officially offered no contestants in the 1975 general election. Osborne stood as an independent candidate and was re-elected. Willard Wheatley threw his lot in with the BVI United Party and won, forming a new coalition government and remaining as Chief Minister.

Osborne ran again in the 1979 general election, but was easily defeated by Cyril Romney and retired for the first time. In that election he was the only candidate who stood for the VI Democratic Party (by then referred to simply as the Democratic Party), and after his defeat the party ceased to exist. Osborne would later come out of retirement to run one more time, in 1986, but garnered barely any electoral support and lost by a wide margin.

== Electoral history ==
Q.W. Osborne electoral history
Year	District	Party	Votes	Percentage	Winning/losing margin	Result
1963	5th District	Non-party election	252	73.5%	+161	Won
1967	4th District	VI Democratic Party	216	50.3%	+69	Won
1971	4th District	VI Democratic Party	--	--	--	Won
1975	5th District	Virgin Islands Party	323	56.8%	+77	Won
1979	5th District	VI Democratic Party	119	31.7%	-103	Lost; C. Romney
1983	Did not run					
1986	5th District	Independent	41	7.4%	-140	Lost; E.W. Brewley

== Political office ==
Political offices
Preceded by New Office	Leader of the Opposition; 1967–1971	Succeeded by Lavity Stoutt
