= Leader of the Opposition (British Virgin Islands) =

Leader of Her Majesty's Most Loyal Opposition
- Incumbent; Marlon Penn since 21 April 2026
- Style: The Honourable
- Term length: While leader of the largest political party in the House of Assembly that is not in government
- Inaugural holder: Q.W. Osborne
- Formation: Virgin Islands Constitution Order, 1967 (Statutory)

The Leader of the Opposition (officially the Leader of His Majesty's Most Loyal Opposition in the British Virgin Islands) is the leader of the largest political party in the House of Assembly that is not in government.

Under the Constitution the Governor is required to appoint a member of the House of Assembly recommended by a majority of the elected members of the House who are members of any opposition party whose numerical strength in the House is greater than that of any other opposition party, or if no such person exists, the member of the House of Assembly who in the judgement of the Governor is best able to command the support of the members of the House in opposition to the Government.

Prior to the introduction of the current Constitution, which codified the position, the Leader of the Opposition, by convention, led the largest party which is not part of the government: where one party wins outright this is the party leader of the second largest political party in the House of Assembly. However, in 1990 Cyril Romney was appointed Leader of the Opposition as an Independent and in 1995 Walwyn Brewley was appointed despite leading the party with the third largest number of seats. The Leader of the Opposition is normally viewed as an alternative Premier.

On 21 April 2025 Marlon Penn was appointed as the most recent leader of the opposition.

== Overview ==
To date a total of fourteen people (all men) have served as Leader of the Opposition - over twice the number who have served as Premier or Chief Minister. Every person who has served as Chief Minister or Premier has also served as Leader of the Opposition at some point. No person has ever served consecutive terms as Leader of the Opposition.

On five occasions has the Leader of the Opposition changed between elections:

- In 1977, when Austin Henley died.
- In 1988, when Ralph O'Neal left the United Party to join the Government.
- In 2017, when Andrew Fahie ousted Julian Fraser as leader of the opposition Virgin Islands Party.
- In 2018, when a split in the ruling government party led to Ronnie Skelton becoming the leader of the largest non-Government party.
- In 2022 when the opposition National Democratic Party joined the Virgin Islands Party in a unity government, and left Julian Fraser as the member of the House of Assembly who was not in either party or in Cabinet.

== 2015 deadlock and controversy ==
In 2014, whilst Ralph O'Neal was Leader of the Opposition he stepped down as leader of the Virgin Islands Party in favour of Julian Fraser. However O'Neal remained the official Leader of the Opposition under the Territory's constitution until he stood down in subsequent general election in June 2015. In that election only two members of the opposition Virgin Islands Party won their seats - Julian Fraser and Andrew Fahie. Subsequently Fraser and Fahie argued over who should be named as Leader of the Opposition; Fahie believed he commanded majority support within the party and should take over as party leader following the general election defeat. As the Constitution required that the Leader of the Opposition commanded a support of the "majority" of the opposition members, and the only two opposition members disagreed, there was an impasse. Governor John Duncan gave the men a month to resolve their differences, but they were unable to do so, and eventually the Governor appointed Fraser as the official Leader of the Opposition. Fahie would later oust Fraser as party leader, and would then be appointed as Leader of the Opposition in his stead.

== Leaders of the Opposition from 1967 ==
Prior to 1967 politicians were not elected on a party political basis, and thus Leaders of the Opposition only came into being with the introduction of party politics and Ministerial rule after the 1967 general election.

The following is a list of the Leaders of the Opposition in the British Virgin Islands from 1967 to date.

Leaders of the Opposition in the British Virgin Islands
Term		Incumbent	Party	Notes
Start	End	Incumbent	Party	Notes
1967	1971	Q.W. Osborne	VIDP	
1971	1975	H. Lavity Stoutt	VIP	
1975	1977*	Austin Henley	VIDP	
1977	1979	Oliver Cills	VIDP	
1979	1983	Willard Wheatley	UP	
1983	1986	H. Lavity Stoutt	VIP	2nd Term
1986	1988**	Ralph T. O'Neal	UP	
1988	1990	Conrad Maduro	UP	
1990	1995	Cyril Romney	Independent	
1995	1999	E. Walwyn Brewley	CCM	
1999	2003	D. Orlando Smith	NDP	
2003	2007	Ralph T. O'Neal	VIP	2nd Term
2007	2011	D. Orlando Smith	NDP	2nd Term
2011	2015	Ralph T. O'Neal	VIP	3rd Term
21 July 2015	5 February 2017	Julian Fraser	VIP	
6 February 2017	21 December 2018	Andrew Fahie	VIP	
22 December 2018	25 February 2019	Ronnie Skelton	PVIM	
28 February 2019	5 May 2022	Marlon Penn	NDP	
5 May 2022	26 April 2023	Julian Fraser	PU	
27 April 2023	24 April 2025	Ronnie Skelton	PVIM	
24 March 2025	21 April 2026	Myron Walwyn	NPD	
21 April 2026	Incumbent	Marlon Penn	NDP	
* Austin Henley died in office in 1977. ** Ralph O'Neal left to join the Virgin Islands Party in 1988.

Party affiliations are as follows:

- VIP—Virgin Islands Party
- NDP—National Democratic Party
- CCM—Concerned Citizens Movement
- PVIM—Positive Virgin Islands Movement
- VIDP—VI Democratic Party (defunct)
- UP—United Party (defunct)
- PU—Progressives United
