= 1983 British Virgin Islands general election =

General election held in the British Virgin Islands

- 11 November 1983

All seats in the British Virgin Islands Legislative Council 5 seats needed for a majority
- Turnout: 73.2%
	First party	Second party
Leader	Lavity Stoutt	Willard Wheatley
Party	VIP	United Party
Leader since	1971	1975
Leader's seat	1st District	7th District
Seats won	4	4
Popular vote	1,355	1,322
Percentage	44.90%	43.80%
Chief Minister before election
Lavity Stoutt
Virgin Islands Party
Elected Chief Minister
Cyril Romney
BVI United Party (Coalition)

General elections were held in the British Virgin Islands on 11 November 1983. The result was a victory for the opposition United Party in coalition with independent candidate Cyril Romney over the governing Virgin Islands Party (VIP) led by former Chief Minister Lavity Stoutt. Each major party won four seats, and Cyril Romney was the sole remaining elected independent. Accordingly, Romney allegedly agree to join a coalition with whichever party would make him Chief Minister. The VIP declined to do so, but the UP eventually agreed thereby winning the election despite securing a smaller overall percentage of the vote.

Janice George served as the supervisor of elections. Turnout averaged 73.1% across the six districts that voted; the 1st District had the highest turnout (83.5%) and the 3rd District had the lowest (67.8%).

1983 was the second election after the Legislative Council had been expanded from seven district seats to nine. Astonishingly, just like the previous election, fully one third of the seats up for election were not contested, with only a single candidate standing in the 7th, 8th and 9th Districts. For the 7th and 8th Districts, this was the second consecutive general election when those seats went uncontested.

The election is also notable in that every single person who would ever serve as Chief Minister of the British Virgin Islands (excluding Premiers) (Stoutt, Wheatley, Romney and O'Neal) was elected during the 1983 general election.

Notable candidates who were elected for the first time included future Leader of the Opposition, E. Walwyn Brewley.

== Results ==
Party	Votes	%	Seats	+/–
Virgin Islands Party	1,355	44.90	4	0
United Party	1,322	43.80	4	+3
Independents	341	11.30	1	–3
Total	3,018	100.00	9	0
Valid votes	3,018	97.04		
Invalid/blank votes	92	2.96		
Total votes	3,110	100.00		
Registered voters/turnout	4,252	73.14		
Source: BVI Deputy Governor's Office

=== By constituency ===
Terrance B. Lettsome (7th District, Virgin Islands Party), Willard Wheatley (8th District, United Party), and Ralph T. O'Neal (9th District, Virgin Islands Party) were elected unopposed.

1st District
Candidate	Party	Votes	%
Hamilton Lavity Stoutt	Virgin Islands Party	421	55.61
Basil Blake	United Party	336	44.39
Total		757	100.00
Valid votes		757	97.55
Invalid/blank votes		19	2.45
Total votes		776	100.00
Registered voters/turnout		929	83.53

2nd District
Candidate	Party	Votes	%
Conrad Maduro	United Party	148	53.43
Prince Stoutt	Virgin Islands Party	129	46.57
Total		277	100.00
Valid votes		277	98.93
Invalid/blank votes		3	1.07
Total votes		280	100.00
Registered voters/turnout		399	70.18

3rd District
Candidate	Party	Votes	%
Earl Fraser	United Party	244	50.83
Oliver Cills	Virgin Islands Party	236	49.17
Total		480	100.00
Valid votes		480	95.62
Invalid/blank votes		22	4.38
Total votes		502	100.00
Registered voters/turnout		740	67.84

4th District
Candidate	Party	Votes	%
Walwyn Brewley	United Party	310	58.27
Alban Ulric Anthony	Virgin Islands Party	222	41.73
Total		532	100.00
Valid votes		532	96.73
Invalid/blank votes		18	3.27
Total votes		550	100.00
Registered voters/turnout		801	68.66

5th District
Candidate	Party	Votes	%
Cyril Romney	Independent	187	40.30
Eileene L. Parsons	Independent	154	33.19
Patsy Lake	Virgin Islands Party	68	14.66
Harold Vanterpool	United Party	55	11.85
Total		464	100.00
Valid votes		464	97.48
Invalid/blank votes		12	2.52
Total votes		476	100.00
Registered voters/turnout		694	68.59

6th District
Candidate	Party	Votes	%
Omar Hodge	Virgin Islands Party	279	54.92
Charles Mercer	United Party	229	45.08
Total		508	100.00
Valid votes		508	96.58
Invalid/blank votes		18	3.42
Total votes		526	100.00
Registered voters/turnout		689	76.34
