= Andrew Fahie =

British Virgin Islands politician

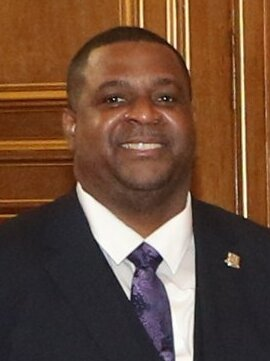
- Fahie in 2021

Premier of the British Virgin Islands
- In office 26 February 2019 – 5 May 2022
- Monarch: Elizabeth II
- Governor: Augustus Jaspert; John Rankin
- Preceded by: Orlando Smith
- Succeeded by: Natalio Wheatley

Leader of the Opposition
- In office 6 February 2017 – 21 December 2018
- Monarch: Elizabeth II
- Governor: John Duncan; Augustus Jaspert
- Preceded by: Julian Fraser
- Succeeded by: Ronnie Skelton

Personal details
- Born: 7 August 1970 (age 56) Tortola, British Virgin Islands
- Party: Virgin Islands Party
- Spouse: Sheila Elaine Forbes-Fahie
- Children: 2
- Education: Florida A&M University

Andrew Alturo Fahie (/fɔɪ/, born 7 August 1970) is a British Virgin Islands politician who served as Premier of the British Virgin Islands (BVI) from 2019 to 2022. He was also the chairman of the Virgin Islands Party in the British Virgin Islands from 2016 to 2022. He was convicted of a range of charges relating to conspiracy to import cocaine into the United States in 2024.

Fahie was the elected House of Assembly member for the First District from 1999 to 2022. He was appointed chairman of the Virgin Islands Party on 30 November 2016 after winning a leadership contest with incumbent leader, Julian Fraser. On 6 February 2017 he was officially appointed Leader of the Opposition. On 25 February 2019 Fahie led his party to victory in the 2019 British Virgin Islands general election, and was sworn in as Premier the following day.

On 28 April 2022, Fahie was arrested in the United States on charges related to drug trafficking and money laundering. Shortly afterwards, on 5 May 2022, he was removed as Premier by a near-unanimous vote in the House of Assembly. He remained as the First District Representative until November 2022. He was convicted of all charges on 8 February 2024.

He is often referred to by his nickname, the Brown Bomber.

== Early life and education ==
Andrew Fahie was born in 1970 to Ernest Alturo Fahie and Iris Dorene Romney. His father was a shopkeeper.

After graduating from the BVI High School in 1986, Fahie attended the University of the Virgin Islands in St. Thomas, U.S. Virgin Islands, and then earned a BSc in Education from Florida A&M University, graduating in 1991. He initially taught as a Maths teacher at Elmore Stoutt High School.

Fahie is married to Sheila Fahie (née Herbert-Forbes). Together they have had three children, one of whom died in infancy.

== Political career ==
Fahie was first elected as the 1st District representative in 1999 at the age of 28, and he held the seat continuously since then. He has previously served as Minister for Education and Culture from 2007 to 2011, and as Minister for Health, Education and Welfare from 2000 to 2003. Since 1999 he has dominated the voting in his 1st District – his smallest margin of victory has been 27.6% of the vote (2015).

=== Leader of the Opposition ===
In the 2015 general election only two members of the Virgin Islands Party won their seats – Julian Fraser and Fahie. Subsequently, Fraser and Fahie argued over who should be named as leader of the opposition, as Fraser believed that he should take over as the incumbent party leader following the general election defeat. Fahie disagreed as he believed the majority of party members would prefer him to take over as leader following the party's disastrous electoral defeat.

As the Constitution required that the Leader of the Opposition commanded a support of the "majority" of the opposition members, and the only two opposition members disagreed, there was an impasse. Governor John Duncan gave the men a month to resolve their differences, but they were unable to do so, and eventually the Governor appointed Fraser as the official Leader of the Opposition.

Fahie later ousted Fraser as party leader, and was appointed Leader of the Opposition in his stead.

He was succeeded by Ronnie Skelton as opposition leader on 22 December 2018 after the ruling Government party split, and the Skelton-led faction became the largest opposition party.

Fahie, when he was Leader of the Opposition, frequently commented that a Commission of Inquiry was needed into BVI Government corruption. In 2021, Governor Augustus Jaspert launched a corruption inquiry in the Territory shortly before demitting office, appointing Sir Gary Hickinbottom as commissioner. In April 2022, the Commission of Inquiry was published, concluding that governance in the Territory had been "appallingly bad", and that it was "highly likely" that serious dishonesty had taken place. It concluded that the constitution should be suspended and its government dissolved – returning direct rule from London.

=== Premier ===
Fahie led his party to victory in the 2019 British Virgin Islands general election, and was sworn in as Premier the following day.

He was removed as Premier on 5 May 2022 after the House of Assembly passed a no-confidence motion against his government, following his arrest by the US Drug Enforcement Administration (DEA).

=== Resignation ===
He formally resigned his seat at representative of the First District on 24 November 2022. In his resignation letter to the Speaker of the House he indicated that he was retiring from representational politics.

== Shooting incident ==
In 2007 Fahie suffered a gunshot wound to his left leg during an attempted bank robbery. The wound was not serious. Fahie tried to sue the bank for the injuries he received. He lost at trial, and the case was settled before the appeal was heard.

== Money laundering and cocaine allegations ==
=== 2003 ===
In 2003, Offshore Alert reported that Fahie was under investigation about allegations of money laundering. Fahie did not deny that an investigation took place, but contended that no action was taken against him as a result of the investigation. In 2018 he called the allegations "outdated, unproven, and unsubstantiated". According to a 2025 article in The Guardian, Fahie boasted about handling illicit cash in the past to a DEA informant.

=== 2022–2024 ===
On 28 April 2022, Fahie was arrested by the US Drug Enforcement Administration (DEA) in Miami on charges related to money laundering, conspiracy to import 5 kg (11 lb) of cocaine, and planning to assist the Mexico–based Sinaloa Cartel in moving thousands of kilograms of cocaine into the United States for a percentage of the proceeds. The matter went to trial in late January 2024 on four charges: (1) conspiracy to import more than five kilograms of cocaine, (2) conspiracy to engage in money laundering, (3) attempted money laundering, and (4) foreign travel in aid of racketeering. His co-accused, Oleanvine Maynard, gave evidence against him. On 8 February 2024 after a seven day trial the Miami jury convicted him on all counts. On 5 August 2024, he was sentenced to 135 months in federal prison.

== Electoral history ==
Andrew Fahie electoral history
Year	District	Party	Votes	Percentage	Winning/losing margin	Result
1995	1st District	Independent	197	27.5%	-292	Lost; L. Stoutt
1999	1st District	Virgin Islands Party	528	76.9%	+387	Won
2003	1st District	Virgin Islands Party	558	70.9%	+335	Won
2007	1st District	Virgin Islands Party	611	74.1%	+406	Won
2011	1st District	Virgin Islands Party	611	65.8%	+294	Won
2015	1st District	Virgin Islands Party	652	65.4%	+375	Won
2019	1st District	Virgin Islands Party	742	81.0%	+601	Won

Political offices
Preceded by Orlando Smith	Premier of the British Virgin Islands; 2019–2022	Succeeded by Natalio Wheatley
Preceded by Julian Fraser	Leader of the Opposition; 2017–2018	Succeeded by Ronnie Skelton
Preceded by Angel Smith	House of Assembly Member, 1st District; 1999–2022	Succeeded by Karl Dawson
