= John Brudenell-Bruce =

John Charles Brudenell-Bruce, MBE, MStJ (6 March 1885 – 13 February 1960), was an English diplomat in the British service and a politician who served during the years immediately after the reintroduction of democracy in the British Virgin Islands in 1950.

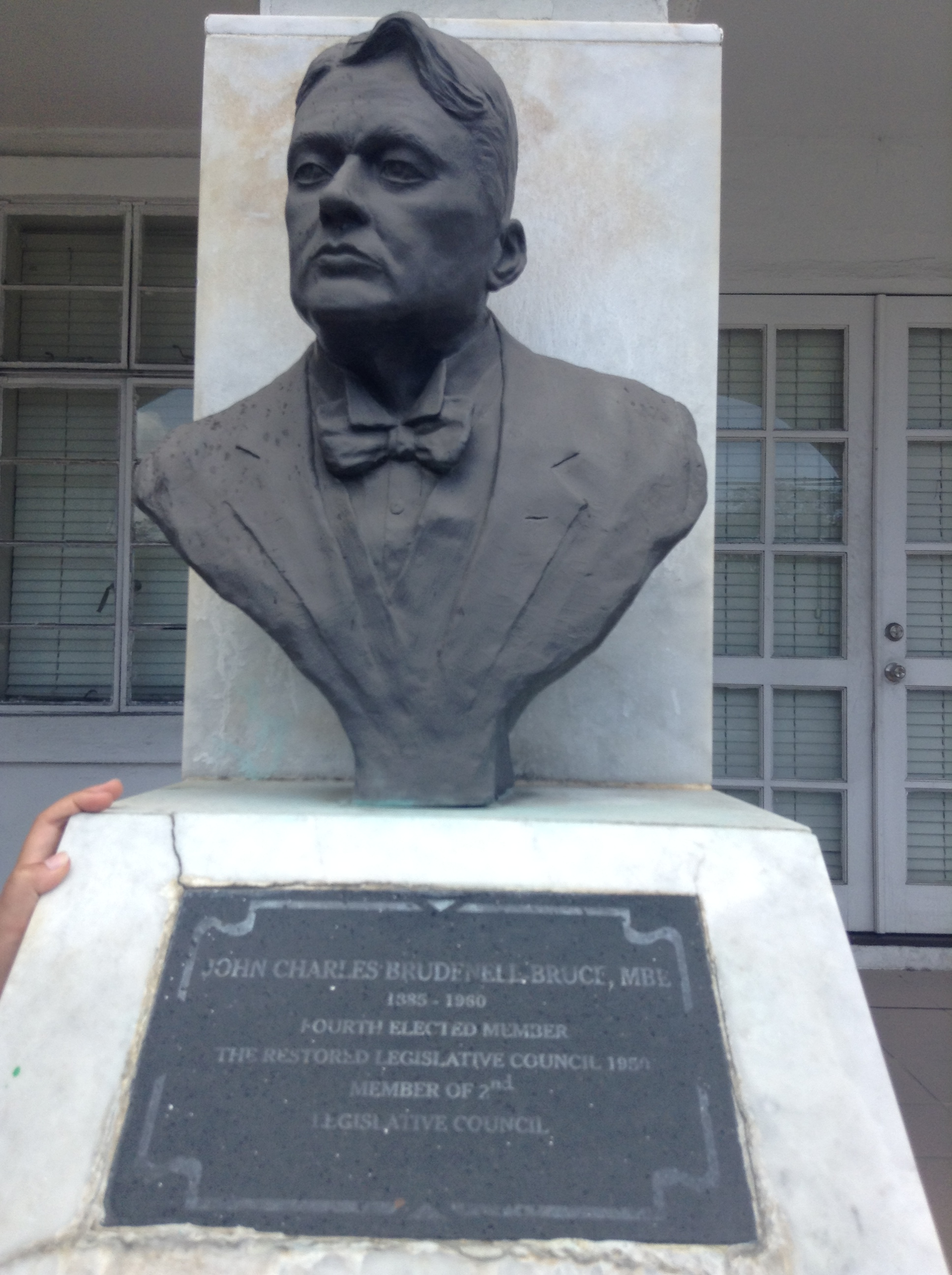
John Charles Brundell-Bruce outside the House of Assembly in Tortola, BVI

Between 1916 and 1918, during the First World War, he was a Second Secretary in the British Diplomatic Service.

He later moved to the British Virgin Islands in the 1930s on the advice of his doctors to seek a warmer climate. He purchased an estate of approximately 230 acres on Peter Island at Little Harbour and established a small tobacco plantation. Subsequently he was elected as a member of First Legislative Council following the reintroduction of democracy in 1950. Although many of Brudenell-Bruce's family had enjoyed long and successful political careers in the United Kingdom, he did not stand in the subsequent general election. However he was appointed to complete the term of Edwin H. Leonard in the 3rd District when Leonard was unable to continue in 1955, and he served the remainder of the term.

He was the first, and to date the only, white person to be elected to the British Virgin Islands legislature since the restoration of democracy in 1950.

== Personal ==
Brudenell-Bruce was born in 1885 to Commodore Lord Robert Thomas Brudenell-Bruce and his wife, Emma. He was the grandson of Ernest Brudenell-Bruce, 3rd Marquess of Ailesbury. He was educated at Harrow School and married Elsie Drechsel on 29 October 1913. They were subsequently divorced in 1925. In 1928 he married Sigrid Ammentorp by whom he had six children (David in 1927, Simon in 1928, Barbara in 1928, Marc in 1930, Diana in 1936 and Arabella in 1942). He died on 13 February 1960 in the British Virgin Islands at the age of 74. He was related to two hereditary titles in the peerage of the United Kingdom: the Marquesses of Ailesbury and the Earls of Cardigan.

== Honors and awards ==
In addition to being a Member of the Order of the British Empire, he was a Knight Commander of the Order of the Dannebrog, and a Member of the Order of Saint John.

== Electoral history ==
John Charles Brudenell-Bruce electoral history
Year	District	Party	Votes	Percentage	Winning/losing margin	Result
1950	At-large	Non-party election	--	--	--	Won
1954	3rd District	Non-party election	did not stand. Completed the term of Edwin H. Leonard			
