= Howard Reynold Penn =

British Virgin Islands politician

H.R. Penn.

Howard Reynold Penn OBE (1903–1994), more commonly known simply as H.R. Penn, was a politician who served during the years immediately after the reintroduction of democracy in the British Virgin Islands in 1950. He was elected as a member of First Legislative Council and continued to serve until his defeat in the 1963 general election.

Prior to the introduction of Ministerial government in 1967, various executive type posts were delegated to members of the Legislative Council in a ministerial-like fashion. From 1957 to 1960 H.R. Penn was appointed Member for Trade and Production, and he was reappointed to that post from 1960 to 1963.

H.R. Penn later served as the Speaker of the House from 1971 to 1975 under Willard Wheatley's administration.

Record keeping during the early years of politics in the British Virgin Islands was poor; electoral records are incomplete, and there were no newspapers published in the Territory at the time (the first newspaper in the British Virgin Islands, The Island Sun, was first published in 1962). Much of the information on politics from the early days come from H.R. Penn's memoirs.

== Electoral history ==
H.R. Penn electoral history
Year	District	Party	Votes	Percentage	Winning/losing margin	Result
1950	At-large	Non-party election	--	--	--	Won
1954	2nd District	Non-party election	--	--	--	Won
1957	2nd District	Non-party election	--	--	--	Won
1960	2nd District	Non-party election	--	--	--	Won
1963	2nd District	Non-party election	173	13.8%	-66	Lost*
* Two candidates were elected in the 2nd District. H.R. Penn obtained 66 votes fewer than the second placed candidate (Arnando Scatliffe)

== Footnotes ==
Political offices
Preceded by Henry O. Creque, MBE	Speaker of the House of Assembly; 1971 - 1975	Succeeded by Ivan Dawson
