= 1986 British Virgin Islands general election =

General election held in the British Virgin Islands

- 17 November 1986

All seats in the British Virgin Islands Legislative Council 5 seats needed for a majority
- Turnout: 67.5%
	First party	Second party
Leader	Lavity Stoutt	Ralph T. O'Neal
Party	VIP	United Party
Leader since	1971	1986
Leader's seat	1st District	9th District
Last election	4 seats, 43.8%	4 seats, 42.3%
Seats before	4	4
Seats won	5	2
Seat change	▲1	▼2
Popular vote	1,838	977
Percentage	46.63%	24.78%
Chief Minister before election
Cyril Romney
United Party (Coalition)
Elected Chief Minister
Lavity Stoutt
VIP

Snap general elections were held in the British Virgin Islands on 17 November 1986. The result was a victory for the Virgin Islands Party (VIP) led by Chief Minister Lavity Stoutt over the United Party (UP). Subsequent to the election, Ralph T. O'Neal became leader of the opposition despite not being head of the UP.

The VIP won five of the nine available seats giving it an absolute majority. Conrad Maduro and Ralph O'Neal were the only members of the UP to win a seat. Maduro only won by a single vote, and O'Neal would change allegiance to the Virgin Islands Party before the next general election. Two candidates running as independents, Walwyn Brewley and former Chief Minister Cyril Romney, were elected. The election victory would make the start of 17 consecutive years in power for the VIP, which would only end in the 2003 general election.

Although Stoutt had lost the previous election, former Chief Minister Cyril Romney had been forced to step down on 1 October 1986 by Governor David Barwick, and so Stoutt had assumed Premiership by virtue of leadership of the largest party in the house prior to the election.

Janice George-Creque served as the supervisor of elections. The turnout was 67.5% across the Territory, although this masked regional variations in the individual district seats. Turnout was highest in the 9th District (81.3%) and lowest in the 2nd (60.3%) and 3rd (60.6%) Districts. The 2nd District was decided by a single vote.

== Background ==
Whilst serving as Chief Minister Romney was the 99% owner of a trust company called Financial Management Trust, which had been linked with laundering drugs money. Although Romney was not personally implicated in the money laundering scheme, he was serving as Chief Minister at the time, the Legislative Council resolved to debate a no-confidence motion, and Governor Barwick ordered Romney to step down. To preempt the motion, Romney dissolved the Legislative Council and called a general election.

== Results ==
Although Romney himself was returned as the representative for Fifth District, his coalition partners in the United Party were beaten by Lavity Stoutt's Virgin Islands Party. The former coalition won only three seats: Romney himself, Conrad Maduro (and Maduro's victory was by a single vote), and Ralph O'Neal. O'Neal was appointed leader of the opposition, but that role would pass to Maduro when O'Neal later joined the Virgin Islands Party.

The defeat of Q.W. Osborne was the end of his political career. Willard Wheatley also suffered the first defeat of his political career, but would continue in politics.

Party	Votes	%	Seats	+/–
Virgin Islands Party	1,838	46.63	5	+1
United Party	977	24.78	2	–2
People's Party	255	6.47	0	New
Independents	872	22.12	2	+1
Speaker and Attorney General			2	–
Total	3,942	100.00	11	0
Valid votes	3,942	98.04		
Invalid/blank votes	79	1.96		
Total votes	4,021	100.00		
Registered voters/turnout	5,948	67.60		
Source: BVI Deputy Governor's Office

=== By constituency ===
1st District
Candidate	Party	Votes	%
H. Lavity Stoutt	Virgin Islands Party	416	66.14
Basil Blake	People's Party	213	33.86
Total		629	100.00
Valid votes		629	98.13
Invalid/blank votes		12	1.87
Total votes		641	100.00
Registered voters/turnout		929	69.00

2nd District
Candidate	Party	Votes	%
Conrad Maduro	BVI United Party	92	39.48
Prince Stoutt	Independent	91	39.06
Malcia Hodge	Virgin Islands Party	50	21.46
Total		233	100.00
Valid votes		233	96.68
Invalid/blank votes		8	3.32
Total votes		241	100.00
Registered voters/turnout		398	60.55

3rd District
Candidate	Party	Votes	%
Oliver Cills	Virgin Islands Party	252	57.27
Alfred Christopher	BVI United Party	103	23.41
Earl Fraser	Independent	43	9.77
Ishmael Brathwaite	People's Party	42	9.55
Total		440	100.00
Valid votes		440	98.65
Invalid/blank votes		6	1.35
Total votes		446	100.00
Registered voters/turnout		740	60.27

4th District
Candidate	Party	Votes	%
Walwyn Brewley	Independent	181	34.28
Elihu R. Rymer	Independent	110	20.83
Alban Ulric Anthony	Virgin Islands Party	91	17.23
Ishmael P. Scatliffe	Independent	64	12.12
Qwominer William Osborne	Independent	41	7.77
Ulric Scatliffe	BVI United Party	41	7.77
Total		528	100.00
Valid votes		528	95.31
Invalid/blank votes		26	4.69
Total votes		554	100.00
Registered voters/turnout		801	69.16

5th District
Candidate	Party	Votes	%
Cyril Romney	Independent	184	43.19
Eileene L. Parsons	Independent	158	37.09
Patsy Lake	Virgin Islands Party	84	19.72
Total		426	100.00
Valid votes		426	97.71
Invalid/blank votes		10	2.29
Total votes		436	100.00
Registered voters/turnout		693	62.91

6th District
Candidate	Party	Votes	%
Omar Hodge	Virgin Islands Party	294	64.05
Charles Mercer	BVI United Party	165	35.95
Total		459	100.00
Valid votes		459	98.92
Invalid/blank votes		5	1.08
Total votes		464	100.00
Registered voters/turnout		688	67.44

7th District
Candidate	Party	Votes	%
Terrance B. Lettsome	Virgin Islands Party	227	75.67
Collingston George	BVI United Party	73	24.33
Total		300	100.00
Valid votes		300	99.01
Invalid/blank votes		3	0.99
Total votes		303	100.00
Registered voters/turnout		456	66.45

8th District
Candidate	Party	Votes	%
Louis Walters	Virgin Islands Party	178	51.74
Willard Wheatley	BVI United Party	166	48.26
Total		344	100.00
Valid votes		344	98.57
Invalid/blank votes		5	1.43
Total votes		349	100.00
Registered voters/turnout		521	66.99

9th District
Candidate	Party	Votes	%
Ralph T. O'Neal	BVI United Party	337	57.80
Allen O'Neal	Virgin Islands Party	246	42.20
Total		583	100.00
Valid votes		583	99.32
Invalid/blank votes		4	0.68
Total votes		587	100.00
Registered voters/turnout		722	81.30
