= 2007 British Virgin Islands general election =

- 20 August 2007

13 of the 15 seats in the House of Assembly 7 seats needed for a majority
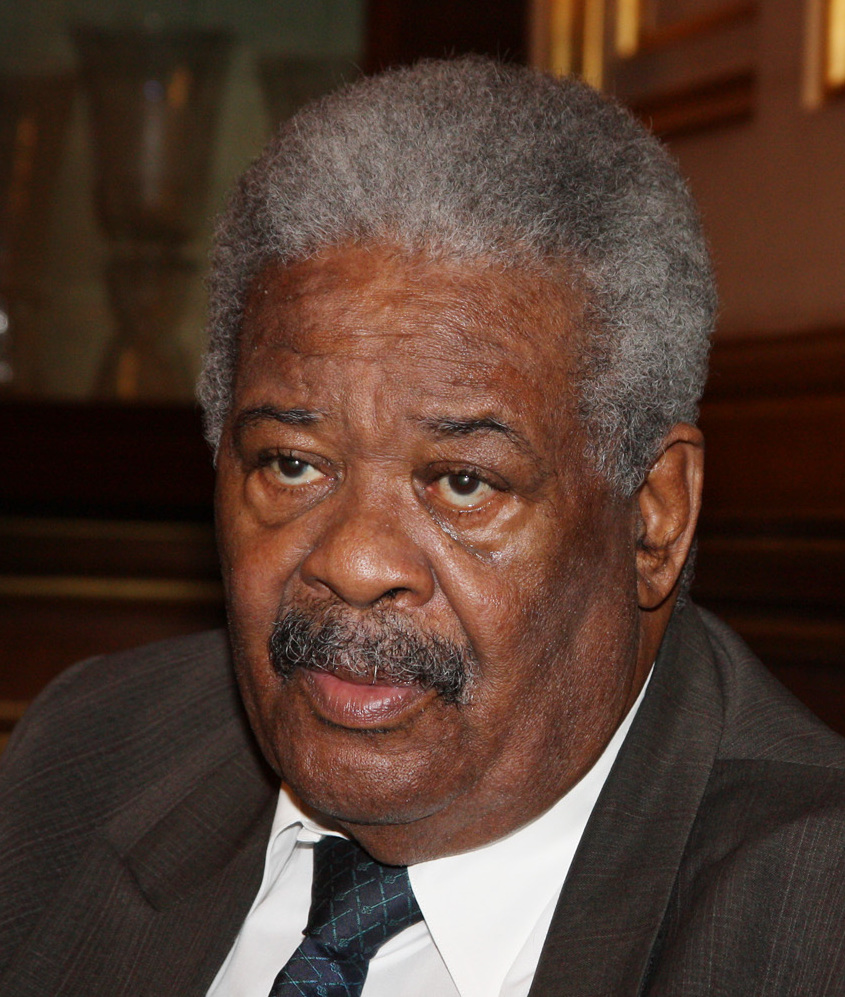

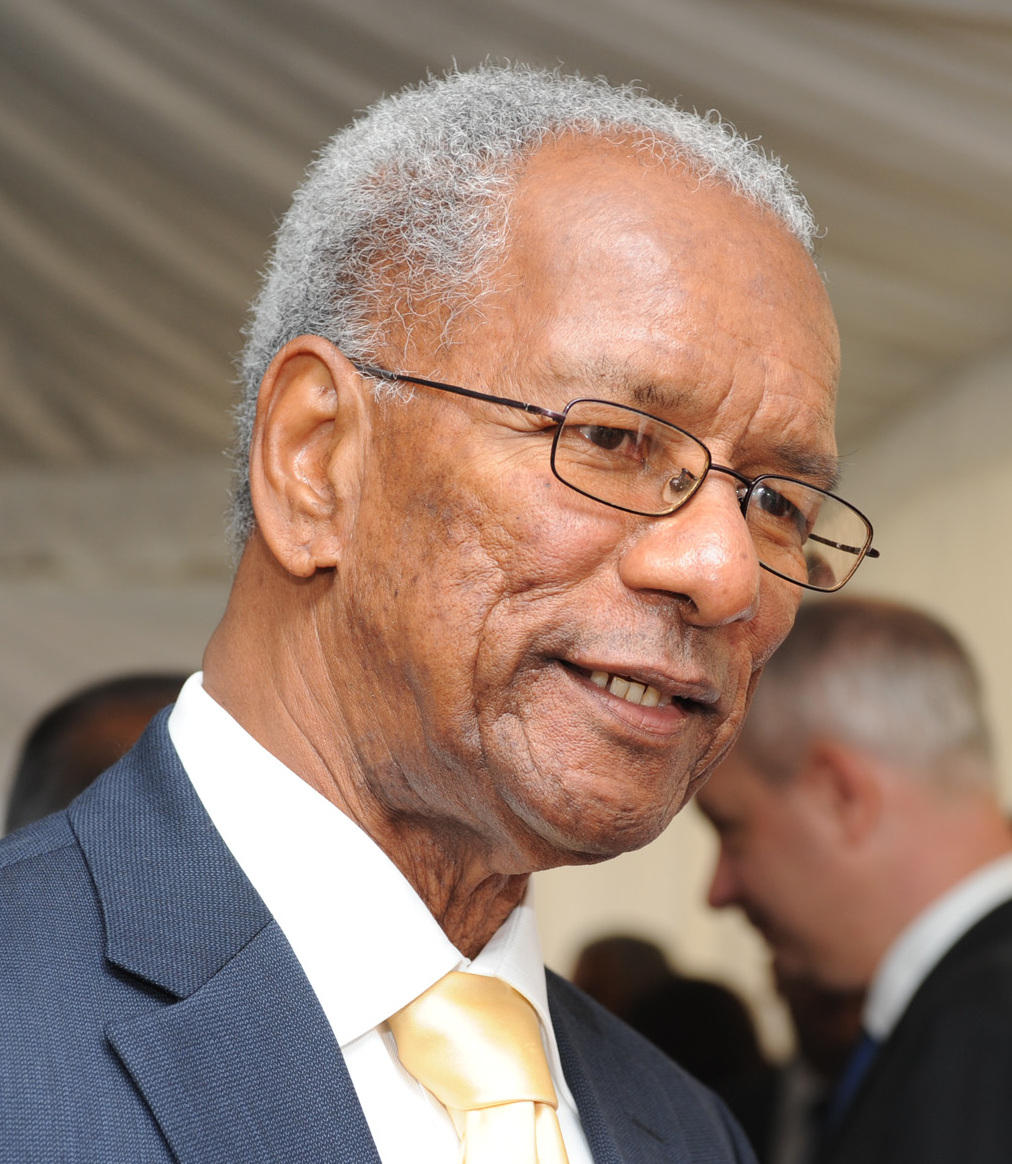
	First party	Second party
Leader	Ralph T. O'Neal	Orlando Smith
Party	VIP	NDP
Last election	42.22%, 5 seats	52.39%, 8 seats
Seats won	10	2
Seat change	▲5	▼6
Percentage	50.31%	46.74%
Premier before election
Orlando Smith
NDP
Premier after election
Ralph T. O'Neal
VIP

General elections were held in the British Virgin Islands on 20 August 2007. The result was a landslide victory for the opposition Virgin Islands Party (VIP) over the incumbent National Democratic Party (NDP).

The VIP took 7 of the 9 district seats (of the remaining district seats, only 1 was taking by the NDP; the other was taken by Alvin Christopher, an independent candidate endorsed by the VIP). The VIP also took 3 out of the 4 territorial at-large seats. The only two NDP candidates to retain their seats were former Chief Minister Orlando Smith and seventh district representative Kedrick Pickering. VIP at-large candidate Zoë McMillan-Walcott had initially asked for a recount of her vote against Orlando Smith for the fourth at-large seat (the initial count indicated her to have received only 18 fewer votes), but she subsequently withdrew the request.

The victory gave the VIP an unprecedented 10 elected seats out of the 13 available in the House of Assembly of the British Virgin Islands, despite receiving only a mere 5.6% greater share of the votes than the NDP (45.2% to 39.6%).

Voter turnout was relatively high, with approximately 62.3% of registered voters casting votes; although this was some way lower than the 72.2% voter turnout for the 2003 election. The lowest turnout was in the fifth district, where only 49.3% of voters cast votes; the highest was the eighth district, where 76.2% turnout was recorded.

The Supervisor of elections reported that the elections passed off "without incident".

== Results ==
Because of the NDP's high dependence upon At-large seats, a relatively small shift in voter sentiment turned a defeat into a massacre. After winning all four At-large seats in the previous election, in 2007 the NDP could barely cling onto one with Orlando Smith eclipsing Zoë Walcott-McMillan by just 18 votes out of a total of ballots cast. Dr Smith's election was the only thing that went right for the NDP on election day, with seemingly every other close race falling into the laps of the VIP, in each case snatching close victories in the Fourth, Fifth and Eighth Districts.

A variety of circumstances combined to convert the VIP's 45.2% of the electoral votes into 84.6% (11 out of 13) of the available seats once Alvin Christopher (who won as an independent) formally decided to rejoin his former party.

Party	District			At-large			Total seats	+/–
Party	Votes	%	Seats	Votes	%	Seats	Total seats	+/–
Virgin Islands Party	3,838	52.63	7	14,477	50.31	3	10	+5
National Democratic Party	2,563	35.14	1	13,449	46.74	1	2	–6
Independents	892	12.23	1	850	2.95	0	1	+1
Speaker and Attorney General							2	0
Total	7,293	100.00	9	28,776	100.00	4	15	0
Valid votes	7,293	98.17		7,343	99.07			
Invalid/blank votes	136	1.83		69	0.93			
Total votes	7,429	100.00		7,412	100.00			
Registered voters/turnout	11,175	66.48		11,175	66.33			
Source: Election Centre

=== District seats ===
The closest races were in the fourth district (where only 27 votes separated the candidates), the fifth district (23 votes separated the leading candidates, and 87 votes went to independent candidates) and the ninth where a mere 9 votes separated the candidates (46 votes having gone to the independent candidate) and a recount was conducted.

Alvin Christopher received the highest percentage of votes for a territorial candidate (75.9%), whilst Andrew Fahie received the highest number of total votes. Hubert O'Neal had the unhappy distinction of having the highest number of votes (467 votes, higher than 5 successful candidates) and the highest percentage of the vote (46.9%) for a losing territorial candidate. Elvis "Jughead" Harrigan had the lowest number of votes (309) and percentage of vote (44.7%) for any successful territorial candidate.

1st District
Candidate	Party	Votes	%
Andrew Fahie	Virgin Islands Party	611	74.88
Archibald Christian	National Democratic Party	205	25.12
Total		816	100.00
Valid votes		816	98.91
Invalid/blank votes		9	1.09
Total votes		825	100.00
Registered voters/turnout		1,277	64.60

2nd District
Candidate	Party	Votes	%
Alvin Christopher	Independent	484	77.69
Gerald Chinnery	National Democratic Party	139	22.31
Total		623	100.00
Valid votes		623	97.65
Invalid/blank votes		15	2.35
Total votes		638	100.00
Registered voters/turnout		1,143	55.82

3rd District
Candidate	Party	Votes	%
Julian Fraser	Virgin Islands Party	590	70.66
Alwon Smith	National Democratic Party	245	29.34
Total		835	100.00
Valid votes		835	98.58
Invalid/blank votes		12	1.42
Total votes		847	100.00
Registered voters/turnout		1,235	68.58

4th District
Candidate	Party	Votes	%
Vincent Scatliffe	Virgin Islands Party	400	50.76
Audley Maduro	National Democratic Party	373	47.34
Courtney de Castro	Independent	15	1.90
Total		788	100.00
Valid votes		788	98.75
Invalid/blank votes		10	1.25
Total votes		798	100.00
Registered voters/turnout		1,226	65.09

5th District
Candidate	Party	Votes	%
Elvis Jerome Harrigan	Virgin Islands Party	422	46.73
Delores Christopher	National Democratic Party	394	43.63
Lesmore Smith	Independent	56	6.20
Nona Vanterpool	Independent	31	3.43
Total		903	100.00
Valid votes		903	99.45
Invalid/blank votes		5	0.55
Total votes		908	100.00
Registered voters/turnout		1,403	64.72

6th District
Candidate	Party	Votes	%
Omar Hodge	Virgin Islands Party	588	70.00
E. Walwyn Brewley	Independent	252	30.00
Total		840	100.00
Valid votes		840	96.22
Invalid/blank votes		33	3.78
Total votes		873	100.00
Registered voters/turnout		1,363	64.05

7th District
Candidate	Party	Votes	%
Kedrick Pickering	National Democratic Party	351	54.08
Ronnie Lettsome	Virgin Islands Party	298	45.92
Total		649	100.00
Valid votes		649	97.59
Invalid/blank votes		16	2.41
Total votes		665	100.00
Registered voters/turnout		1,025	64.88

8th District
Candidate	Party	Votes	%
Dancia Penn	Virgin Islands Party	453	53.29
Lloyd Black	National Democratic Party	389	45.76
Douglas D. Wheatley	Independent	8	0.94
Total		850	100.00
Valid votes		850	98.38
Invalid/blank votes		14	1.62
Total votes		864	100.00
Registered voters/turnout		1,125	76.80

9th District
Candidate	Party	Votes	%
Ralph T. O'Neal	Virgin Islands Party	476	48.13
Hubert O'Neal	National Democratic Party	467	47.22
Devon Osborne	Independent	46	4.65
Total		989	100.00
Valid votes		989	97.82
Invalid/blank votes		22	2.18
Total votes		1,011	100.00
Registered voters/turnout		1,378	73.37

=== Territorial At-Large Seats ===
The top four vote receiving candidates are elected to the at-large seats.

Candidate	Party	Votes	%
Irene Penn-O'Neal	Virgin Islands Party	3,721	12.93
Vernon Elroy Malone	Virgin Islands Party	3,626	12.60
Keith L. Flax	Virgin Islands Party	3,599	12.51
Orlando Smith	National Democratic Party	3,549	12.33
Zoe Walcott-McMillan	Virgin Islands Party	3,531	12.27
Elmore Stoutt	National Democratic Party	3,433	11.93
Ronnie W. Skelton	National Democratic Party	3,404	11.83
Mark Vanterpool	National Democratic Party	3,063	10.64
Alred Frett	Independent	326	1.13
Quincy Lettsome	Independent	250	0.87
Ulric Scatliffe	Independent	174	0.60
Eileene E. Baronville	Independent	100	0.35
Total		28,776	100.00
Valid votes		7,343	99.07
Invalid/blank votes		69	0.93
Total votes		7,412	100.00
Registered voters/turnout		11,175	66.33

== Aftermath ==
On 22 August 2007, the Governor, Mr David Pearey officially appointed Ralph O'Neal as the first Premier (as the position of Chief Minister will be called) under section 52(1) the new constitution. He became only the second person in BVI political history (after Lavity Stoutt) to serve two non-consecutive terms of office as Chief Minister/Premier, and only the third (Lavity Stoutt and Willard Wheatley) to win more than one general election as party leader (both since matched by Orlando Smith). Both were considered remarkable achievements for a politician who was written off by some as a "spent force" after he lost the previous election at the age of 69.

Despite questions over how long Ralph O'Neal expects to serve as Premier, starting his term at the age of 73, he served the full term. Rumours abounded prior to the election that a backroom deal may have been struck with Dancia Penn that she would take over the premiership when he stepped down, mid-term; a move that may presumably cause some internal consternation in the party. Those rumours were further fuelled when Dancia Penn was appointed as Deputy Premier shortly after the election.

On 23 August 2007 the first cabinet was sworn in under Ralph O'Neal.

- In addition to serving as the Territory's first Premier Honourable Ralph T. O’Neal was appointed Minister of Finance and Tourism.
- Honourable Andrew Fahie was appointed Minister of Education and Culture
- Honourable Julian Fraser was appointed Minister of Communications and Works
- Honourable Omar Hodge was appointed Minister of Natural Resources and Labour
- Honourable Dancia Penn, OBE, QC was appointed Minister of Health and Social Development.

Sources: Platinum news; Government Press Release 323R/07
