= 1990 British Virgin Islands general election =

- 12 November 1990

All seats in the British Virgin Islands Legislative Council 5 seats needed for a majority
- Turnout: 70.69%

	First party	Second party
Leader	Hamilton Lavity Stoutt	Omar Hodge
Party	VIP	IPM
Leader's seat	1st District	6th District
Last election	45.7%, 6 seats	–
Seats won	6	1
Seat change	Steady	New
Popular vote	2,409	723
Percentage	46.6%	14.0%
Swing	▲0.9pp	New
Chief Minister before election
Lavity Stoutt
Virgin Islands Party
Elected Chief Minister
Lavity Stoutt
Virgin Islands Party

General elections were held in the British Virgin Islands on 12 November 1990. The result was a decisive victory for the incumbent Virgin Islands Party (VIP) led by Chief Minister Hamilton Lavity Stoutt. Three other parties contested the election: the BVI United Party (UP) led by Conrad Maduro (which fielded six candidates), the newly formed Progressive People's Democratic Party (PPDP) led by former Chief Minister Willard Wheatley (which fielded five candidates), and the newly formed Independent People's Movement (IPM) which fielded only two candidates. The only candidate from a party other than the VIP to be elected was Omar Hodge of the IPM in the Sixth District (Omar Hodge was a former member of the VIP and would later rejoin that party). Independent candidates won in the Fourth and Fifth Districts, and the VIP won every other available seat.

The supervisor of elections was Eugenie Todman-Smith. The turnout was 69.4%. In the individual seats, turnout was highest in the 9th District (91.1%), a record for district turnout in the British Virgin Islands. The turnout was so high that the losing candidate in the 9th District (Allen O'Neal) actually secured more votes than the victorious candidate in every other district except for Lavity Stoutt in the 1st.

== Results ==
The VIP led by Lavity Stoutt won an outright majority of 6 of the 9 available seats.

Party	Votes	%	Seats	+/–
Virgin Islands Party	2,409	46.54	6	+1
Independent People's Movement	723	13.97	1	New
Progressive People's Democratic Party	456	8.81	0	New
United Party	416	8.04	0	–2
Independents	1,172	22.64	2	0
Speaker and Attorney General			2	0
Total	5,176	100.00	11	0
Valid votes	5,176	98.44		
Invalid/blank votes	82	1.56		
Total votes	5,258	100.00		
Registered voters/turnout	7,447	70.61		

=== By constituency ===
1st District
Candidate	Party	Votes	%
Hamilton Lavity Stoutt	Virgin Islands Party	520	88.74
Rasuhuru	Independent	56	9.56
Iran Hyndman	Independent	10	1.71
Total		586	100.00
Valid votes		586	96.70
Invalid/blank votes		20	3.30
Total votes		606	100.00
Registered voters/turnout		1,109	54.64

2nd District
Candidate	Party	Votes	%
Prince Stoutt	Virgin Islands Party	199	55.74
Conrad Maduro	BVI United Party	77	21.57
Carl Dawson	Independent	57	15.97
Malcia A. Rymer-Hodge	Progressive People's Democratic Party	18	5.04
Elroy Henley	Independent	6	1.68
Total		357	100.00
Valid votes		357	99.44
Invalid/blank votes		2	0.56
Total votes		359	100.00
Registered voters/turnout		533	67.35

3rd District
Candidate	Party	Votes	%
Oliver Cills	Virgin Islands Party	343	63.75
Ishmael E. Brathwaite	Progressive People's Democratic Party	137	25.46
Earl P. Fraser	Independent	39	7.25
Edmund Maduro	BVI United Party	19	3.53
Total		538	100.00
Valid votes		538	99.63
Invalid/blank votes		2	0.37
Total votes		540	100.00
Registered voters/turnout		836	64.59

4th District
Candidate	Party	Votes	%
Walwyn Brewley	Independent	235	37.30
Elihu Rhymer	Virgin Islands Party	124	19.68
Inez V. Turnbull	Independent	108	17.14
Merritt Herbert	BVI United Party	69	10.95
Basil Blake	Progressive People's Democratic Party	28	4.44
Noel Lloyd	Independent	28	4.44
Ishmael Scatliffe	Independent	28	4.44
Donald de Castro	Independent	10	1.59
Total		630	100.00
Valid votes		630	98.44
Invalid/blank votes		10	1.56
Total votes		640	100.00
Registered voters/turnout		897	71.35

5th District
Candidate	Party	Votes	%
Cyril Romney	Independent	301	47.40
Eileene L. Parsons	Virgin Islands Party	254	40.00
Patsy Lake	Independent	34	5.35
Harold Vanterpool	BVI United Party	24	3.78
Ulric Scatliffe	Independent	22	3.46
Total		635	100.00
Valid votes		635	97.99
Invalid/blank votes		13	2.01
Total votes		648	100.00
Registered voters/turnout		910	71.21

6th District
Candidate	Party	Votes	%
Omar Hodge	Independent People's Movement	306	48.04
Roy E. Pickering	BVI United Party	170	26.69
Charles Mercer	Independent	141	22.14
Stanford Connor	Independent	20	3.14
Total		637	100.00
Valid votes		637	98.45
Invalid/blank votes		10	1.55
Total votes		647	100.00
Registered voters/turnout		929	69.64

7th District
Candidate	Party	Votes	%
Terrance B. Lettsome	Virgin Islands Party	210	50.85
Betteto Frett	Progressive People's Democratic Party	134	32.45
Collingston George	BVI United Party	57	13.80
Medita Wheatley	Independent	12	2.91
Total		413	100.00
Valid votes		413	98.57
Invalid/blank votes		6	1.43
Total votes		419	100.00
Registered voters/turnout		550	76.18

8th District
Candidate	Party	Votes	%
Louis Walters	Virgin Islands Party	314	60.62
Willard Wheatley	Progressive People's Democratic Party	139	26.83
Alred Frett	Independent	65	12.55
Total		518	100.00
Valid votes		518	98.67
Invalid/blank votes		7	1.33
Total votes		525	100.00
Registered voters/turnout		724	72.51

9th District
Candidate	Party	Votes	%
Ralph T. O'Neal	Virgin Islands Party	445	51.62
Allen O'Neal	Independent People's Movement	417	48.38
Total		862	100.00
Valid votes		862	98.63
Invalid/blank votes		12	1.37
Total votes		874	100.00
Registered voters/turnout		959	91.14
