= 1979 British Virgin Islands general election =

General election held in the British Virgin Islands

- 12 November 1979

All seats in the British Virgin Islands Legislative Council 5 seats needed for a majority
- Turnout: 74.8%
	First party	Second party
Leader	Hamilton Lavity Stoutt	Willard Wheatley
Party	VIP	United Party
Leader since	1971	1975
Leader's seat	1st District	7th District
Seats won	5	1
Popular vote	733	178
Percentage	27.8%	6.7%
Chief Minister before election
Willard Wheatley
United Party (Coalition)
Elected Chief Minister
Hamilton Lavity Stoutt
VIP

General elections were held in the British Virgin Islands on 12 November 1979. The result was a victory for the opposition Virgin Islands Party (VIP) led by former Chief Minister Hamilton Lavity Stoutt over the incumbent United Party (UP) led by Willard Wheatley. The newly formed Virgin Islands National Movement (VINM), led by Elvin Stoutt, also contested the elections but did not win any seats.

The supervisor of elections was Trevor A.F. Peters. Voter turnout was 74.8%.

The 1979 general election was the first election to be conducted after the legislature had been expanded from seven to nine elected seats. Three of the nine seats were not contested, with only a single candidate standing in the 3rd, 7th and 8th Districts. For the 3rd District, this was the second consecutive general election where the seat was uncontested.

The Virgin Islands Party won the election despite receiving only 733 votes in aggregate across all seats, and just 27.8% of the vote. This low figure was in part was caused by the high number of uncontested seats, but also reflected significant voter disenchantment with the political process.

== Background ==
By 1979 internal fighting had severely limited the capability of almost every political party in the British Virgin Islands. After internal fighting, the VI Democratic Party (VIDP) was left with just one candidate: its founder, Q.W. Osborne. The United Party fared little better: it was able to field two candidates. Neither party would win a contested seat, although Willard Wheatley would win the 7th District by default for the United Party as he was unopposed. The newly created Virgin Islands National Movement fielded the second most candidates with three, and even the Virgin Islands Party could only muster four.

== Results ==
The Virgin Islands Party won all four of the seats it contested. Still short of being able to form a government, they moved to secure the loyalty of Oliver Cills (who had previously been a member of the VI Democratic Party), giving them a majority with which to form a government.

The victory of the Virgin Islands Party with just 733 votes and a 27.8% share of the vote are both record lows for a general election in the British Virgin Islands.

Candidates who were elected for the first time included future Chief Minister, Cyril Romney, and future Minister, Omar Hodge, who would hold his seat for the next 32 years (the third longest such span in British Virgin Islands politics).

The defeat of Q.W. Osborne in the 5th District signalled the end of the VI Democratic Party. Following the elections, the United Party was the only party left in existence from the 1967 general election.

Party	Votes	%	Seats	+/–
Virgin Islands Party	733	27.78	4	+1
Virgin Islands National Movement	605	22.93	0	New
United Party	178	6.74	1	–1
VI Democratic Party	119	4.51	0	–1
Independents	1,004	38.04	4	+3
Total	2,639	100.00	9	+2
Valid votes	2,639	98.80		
Invalid/blank votes	32	1.20		
Total votes	2,671	100.00		
Registered voters/turnout	3,570	74.82		
Source: BVI Deputy Governor's Office

=== By constituency ===
Oliver Cills (3rd District, Virgin Islands Party), Terrance B. Lettsome (7th District, Virgin Islands Party), and Willard Wheatley (8th District, United Party) were elected unopposed.

1st District
Candidate	Party	Votes	%
Hamilton Lavity Stoutt	Virgin Islands Party	328	56.16
Elvin O. Stoutt	Virgin Islands National Movement	256	43.84
Total		584	100.00
Valid votes		584	98.32
Invalid/blank votes		10	1.68
Total votes		594	100.00
Registered voters/turnout		765	77.65

2nd District
Candidate	Party	Votes	%
Prince Stoutt	Virgin Islands Party	139	57.44
Edison O'Neal	Virgin Islands National Movement	103	42.56
Total		242	100.00
Valid votes		242	99.18
Invalid/blank votes		2	0.82
Total votes		244	100.00
Registered voters/turnout		364	67.03

4th District
Candidate	Party	Votes	%
Alban Ulric Anthony	Virgin Islands Party	266	50.67
Reynold O'Neal	Virgin Islands National Movement	246	46.86
Carlton deCastro	Independent	13	2.48
Total		525	100.00
Valid votes		525	98.68
Invalid/blank votes		7	1.32
Total votes		532	100.00
Registered voters/turnout		751	70.84

5th District
Candidate	Party	Votes	%
Cyril Romney	Independent	222	65.10
Qwominer William Osborne	VI Democratic Party	119	34.90
Total		341	100.00
Valid votes		341	99.13
Invalid/blank votes		3	0.87
Total votes		344	100.00
Registered voters/turnout		464	74.14

6th District
Candidate	Party	Votes	%
Omar Hodge	Independent	197	52.53
Conrad Maduro	United Party	178	47.47
Total		375	100.00
Valid votes		375	98.94
Invalid/blank votes		4	1.06
Total votes		379	100.00
Registered voters/turnout		550	68.91

9th District
Candidate	Party	Votes	%
Ralph T. O'Neal	Independent	403	70.45
Reeial George	Independent	169	29.55
Total		572	100.00
Valid votes		572	98.96
Invalid/blank votes		6	1.04
Total votes		578	100.00
Registered voters/turnout		676	85.50
