= 1957 British Virgin Islands general election =

General elections were held in the British Virgin Islands in 1957 for seats on the Legislative Council of the British Virgin Islands.

The 1957 election was the first election in which Lavity Stoutt stood and won. It would prove to be the first of eleven consecutive electoral victories for Stoutt (a record) and he would sit in the Legislature for over 38 years consecutively (also a record, since surpassed by Ralph O'Neal) until his death, and would serve as Chief Minister a record five times.

== Results ==
The Territory was divided into five districts, the largest of which (the 2nd District - Road Town) would have two members. At the time candidates were not affiliated with political parties.

Elected member	Constituency
1st District	H. Lavity Stoutt
2nd District	Howard R. Penn
2nd District	Isaac G. Fonseca
3rd District	Ivan Dawson
4th District	Leslie F. Malone
5th District	Waldo E. O'Neal
Source: BVI Deputy Governor's Office
