= 1963 British Virgin Islands general election =

General election held in the British Virgin Islands

General elections were held in the British Virgin Islands on 28 November 1963 for seats on the Legislative Council of the British Virgin Islands.

For the general election the territory was divided into five districts, the largest of which (the 2nd district - Road Town) would have two members. All seats were contested.

The supervisor of elections was Ralph T. O'Neal.

== Results ==
At the time candidates were not affiliated with political parties. Notable candidates elected for the first time included future leader of the opposition, Q.W. Osborne, and future minister, Terrance B. Lettsome.

Constituency	Candidates	Votes	%
1st District	Hamilton Lavity Stoutt	215	68.0
1st District	Edward Stoutt	101	32.0
1st District	Total	316	100
2nd District (Two representatives)	Isaac Glanville Fonseca	442	35.4
2nd District (Two representatives)	Arnando Scatliffe	239	19.1
2nd District (Two representatives)	Ivan Hodge	210	16.8
2nd District (Two representatives)	Stanford Connor	186	14.9
2nd District (Two representatives)	Howard Reynold Penn	173	13.8
2nd District (Two representatives)	Total	1,250	100
3rd District	Ivan Dawson	122	51.7
3rd District	Christopher G. Wellington	114	48.3
3rd District	Total	236	100
4th District	Terrance B. Lettsome	194	52.7
4th District	Leslie F. Malone	174	47.3
4th District	Total	368	100
5th District	Qwominer William Osborne	252	73.5
5th District	Irvin George	91	26.5
5th District	Total	343	100
Source: BVI Deputy Governor's Office

The 1963 election essentially served as a prelude to the introduction of Ministerial government in the next election in 1967. The three most prominent politicians elected, Lavity Stoutt, Q.W. Osborne and Ivan Dawson went on to form political parties in 1967 to contest the election once party politics was introduced to the jurisdiction.

== Appointments ==
Prior to 1967 there were no ministerial appointments in the British Virgin Islands, but elected politicians did undertake certain ministerial type responsibilities. Subsequent to the election, Lavity Stoutt was appointed member for communications and works, and Ivan Dawson was appointed member for trade and production.
