= Ivan Dawson =

Ivan Dawson, CBE was a British Virgin Islands politician.

Subsequent to the restoration of the Legislative Council of the British Virgin Islands in 1950, Dawson was elected as a member for the Third District following general elections in 1957, 1960 and 1963. He was then elected as the member for the Second District in the 1967 general election, which introduced Ministerial rule in the British Virgin Islands, and he was appointed Minister for Natural Resources and Public Health. He later served as Deputy Speaker (1971-1975) and then Speaker (1975-1983) of the Legislative Council.

He was a founding member of the United Party. The Ivan Dawson Primary School and the Ivan Dawson Memorial Scholarship are named in his honour.

== Electoral history ==
Ivan Dawson electoral history
Year	District	Party	Votes	Percentage	Winning/losing margin	Result
1957	3rd District	Non-party election	--	--	--	Won
1960	3rd District	Non-party election	--	--	--	Won
1963	3rd District	Non-party election	122	51.7%	+8	Won
1967	2nd District	BVI United Party	171	50.9%	+32	Won

== Sources ==
- BVI election and information results 1950-2011

Political offices
Preceded by H.R. Penn, MBE	Speaker of the House of Assembly; 1975 - 1983	Succeeded by Keith L. Flax
Preceded by New office	Deputy Speaker of the House of Assembly; 1971 - 1975	Succeeded by Leopold Smith
