= 1960 British Virgin Islands general election =

General elections were held in the British Virgin Islands on 11 October 1960 for seats on the Legislative Council of the British Virgin Islands.

For the general election the Territory was divided into five districts, the largest of which (the 2nd District - Road Town) would have two members. All seats were contested.

The Supervisor of Elections was Norwell Elton Allenby Harrigan.

== Candidates ==
At the time candidates were not affiliated with political parties. The following candidates stood:

District	Candidates
1st District	H. Lavity Stoutt
1st District	Joseph E. Romney
2nd District	Isaac G. Fonseca
2nd District	Carlton de Castro
2nd District	Lawrence de Castro
2nd District	Howard R. Penn
2nd District	Leopold Smith
3rd District	Ivan Dawson
3rd District	Mento Dawson
4th District	Shasael Lettsome
4th District	Leslie F. Malone
5th District	Theodolph Faulkner
5th District	Waldo O'Neal
5th District	Charles Roy

== Results ==
District	Member(s)
1st District	H. Lavity Stoutt
2nd District (two members)	Isaac G. Fonseca
2nd District (two members)	Howard R. Penn
3rd District	Ivan Dawson
4th District	Leslie F. Malone
5th District	Theodolph Faulkner
Source: BVI Deputy Governor's Office
