= 1967 British Virgin Islands general election =

General election held in the British Virgin Islands

- 14 April 1967

All seats in the British Virgin Islands Legislative Council 4 seats needed for a majority
- Turnout: 73.2%
	First party	Second party	Third party
Leader	C.A. Maduro	Q.W. Osborne	I.G. Fonseca
Party	United Party	VIDP	POP
Leader since	1967	1967	1967
Leader's seat	1st District	4th District	5th District
Seats won	4	2	1
Popular vote	1,094	800	663
Percentage	42.8%	31.3%	25.9%
Chief Minister before election
New Office
Elected Chief Minister
Lavity Stoutt
United Party

General elections were held in the British Virgin Islands on 14 April 1967. The election was the first general election after the passing of the new Constitution earlier in the same year, which introduced Ministerial Government into the British Virgin Islands for the first time. Elections under the prior Constitution introduced in 1950 to restore the Legislative Council had merely elected legislators. It is probably fair to say that 1967 marked the introduction of true direct democratic rule in the British Virgin Islands. But, notwithstanding the introduction of Ministerial Government, the resulting Legislative Council is still referred to as the 6th Legislative Council in deference to the five prior Councils elected under the 1950 Constitution.

== Results ==
Prior to 1967 there had been no political parties in the British Virgin Islands. The election was therefore contested by three, newly created, political parties:

1. The BVI United Party, led by Conrad Maduro
2. The VI Democratic Party, led by Qwominer William Osborne
3. The People's Own Party, led by Isaac Fonseca

The BVI United Party contested all seven available seats. The other two parties only contested five seats each. Lavity Stoutt had been elected each year since 1957. Dr Osborne had been elected during the previous election in 1963. Isaac Fonseca was the political veteran having been elected in every single election held in the Territory, commencing with the first in 1950.

The result was a victory for the BVI United Party which won an overall majority of four seats. However, the party President, Conrad Maduro, did not win a seat and so was unable to become Chief Minister despite leading the party with the highest number of seats. Accordingly, Lavity Stoutt was appointed as the first Chief Minister of the British Virgin Islands. The VI Democratic Party won two seats, with the People's Own Party winning the remaining seat. The most closely contested seat between the two parties with a plurality of seats was the Seventh District (Anegada and Virgin Gorda), which Robinson O'Neal won for the BVI United Party by a mere 13 votes over Reeial George for VI Democratic Party. If just seven voters in that district had voted the other way, the VI Democratic Party would have won, and Q.W. Osborne would have been the first Chief Minister. As the results turned out, he had to settle for being the first leader of the opposition. Similarly, if Conrad Maduro had secured a few more votes then he might have been the first Chief Minister. However, as it happened the 1967 election effectively launched a long and successful career for Lavity Stoutt, who would end up being elected Chief Minister five times.

Voter turnout was a relatively high 72.3% with only 5 spoiled ballots in the entire country. The Supervisor of Elections was initially D.K.H. McIntyre, but he had to retire on grounds of ill-health and was replaced by Lionel W. Barker on 27 February 1967.

Party	Votes	%	Seats
United Party	1,094	42.78	4
VI Democratic Party	800	31.29	2
People's Own Party	663	25.93	1
Total	2,557	100.00	7
Valid votes	2,557	99.80	
Invalid/blank votes	5	0.20	
Total votes	2,562	100.00	
Registered voters/turnout	3,500	73.20	
Source: BVI Deputy Governor's Office

=== By constituency ===
Constituency	Candidate	Party	Votes	%
1st District	Hamilton Lavity Stoutt	United Party	221	56.96
1st District	Austin Cameron	VI Democratic Party	167	43.04
2nd District	Ivan Dawson	United Party	171	49.42
2nd District	George A. Christopher	VI Democratic Party	139	40.17
2nd District	Arthur P. Roberts	People's Own Party	36	10.40
3rd District	Leopold Smith	VI Democratic Party	125	37.65
3rd District	Zagoul H. M. Butler	People's Own Party	117	35.24
3rd District	Stanford Connor	United Party	90	27.11
4th District	Qwominer William Osborne	VI Democratic Party	216	50.35
4th District	Arnando Scatliffe	People's Own Party	147	34.27
4th District	Howard R. Penn	United Party	66	15.38
5th District	Isaac Glanville Fonseca	People's Own Party	195	56.36
5th District	Conrad Maduro	United Party	151	43.64
6th District	Terrance B. Lettsome	United Party	229	57.68
6th District	Bernard Penn	People's Own Party	168	42.32
7th District	Robinson O'Neal	United Party	166	52.04
7th District	Reeial George	VI Democratic Party	153	47.96

== Ministerial appointments ==
Lavity Stoutt was appointed as first Chief Minister and first Minister for Education. Q.W. Osborne was appointed as the First Leader of the Opposition. Ivan Dawson, despite not being a member of the BVI United Party, was appointed first Minister for National Resources and Public Health.

Future Chief Minister, Cyril Romney, was also appointed as the first Native BVIslander to act as Financial Secretary after the election.
