= 1971 British Virgin Islands general election =

General election held in the British Virgin Islands

- 2 June 1971

All seats in the British Virgin Islands Legislative Council 4 seats needed for a majority
	First party	Second party	Third party
Leader	Q.W. Osborne	Lavity Stoutt	Conrad Maduro
Party	VIDP	VIP	United Party
Leader since	1967	1971	1971
Leader's seat	4th District	1st District	5th District
Last election	2	–	4
Seats won	3	2	1
Seat change	▲1	New	▼3
Chief Minister before election
Lavity Stoutt
United Party
Elected Chief Minister
Willard Wheatley
Independent

General elections were held in the British Virgin Islands on 2 June 1971. The result was a victory for a coalition of the VI Democratic Party (DP) together with independent candidate Willard Wheatley over the newly formed Virgin Islands Party (VIP) led by former Chief Minister Lavity Stoutt, and incumbent BVI United Party (UP) led by Conrad Maduro.

Prior to the election Stoutt had was serving as Chief Minister and leader of the UP, but due to internal divisions Stoutt left and formed his new party to contest the election against the UP and the DP, but ended up losing and being replaced by Wheatley as Chief Minister.

The election was also notable for the first female candidate in a British Virgin Islands election: Millicent Mercer contested the 5th District on behalf of the VIP, but lost to Conrad Maduro.

In the 7th District the former representative, Robinson O'Neal, had died in a car crash the prior year.

== Results ==
Party	Seats	+/–
VI Democratic Party	3	+1
Virgin Islands Party	2	New
United Party	1	–3
Independents	1	New
Total	7	0
Source: BVI Deputy Governor's Office

=== By constituency ===
Constituency	Candidates	Party	Winner
1st District	H. Lavity Stoutt	Virgin Islands Party	H. Lavity Stoutt
1st District	Wilfred Smith	United Party	H. Lavity Stoutt
2nd District	Austin Henley	VI Democratic Party	Austin Henley
2nd District	Stanford Connor	Independent	Austin Henley
2nd District	Prince Stoutt	Independent	Austin Henley
2nd District	Neville Hodge	Independent	Austin Henley
3rd District	Oliver Cills	VI Democratic Party	Oliver Cills
3rd District	Leopold Smith	Virgin Islands Party	Oliver Cills
4th District	Q. William Osborne	VI Democratic Party	Q. William Osborne
4th District	I. Glanville Fonseca	POP	Q. William Osborne
5th District	Conrad Maduro	United Party	Conrad Maduro
5th District	Henry Hodge	VI Democratic Party	Conrad Maduro
5th District	Millicent Mercer	Virgin Islands Party	Conrad Maduro
6th District	Willard Wheatley	Independent	Willard Wheatley
6th District	Terrance B. Lettsome	Virgin Islands Party	Willard Wheatley
7th District	Reeial George	Virgin Islands Party	Reeial George
7th District	Ralph T. O'Neal	VI Democratic Party	Reeial George
Source: BVI Deputy Governor's Office

== Appointments ==
Following the election:

- Willard Wheatley was appointed Chief Minister and Minister for Education
- Oliver Cills was appointed Minister for Communications, Works and Industry
- Q.W. Osborne was appointed Minister for Natural Resources and Public Health
- Lavity Stoutt became the Leader of the Opposition
