= 2003 British Virgin Islands general election =

General election held in the British Virgin Islands

← 1999	16 June 2003	2007 →

13 of the 15 seats in the House of Assembly 7 seats needed for a majority
- Turnout: 72%
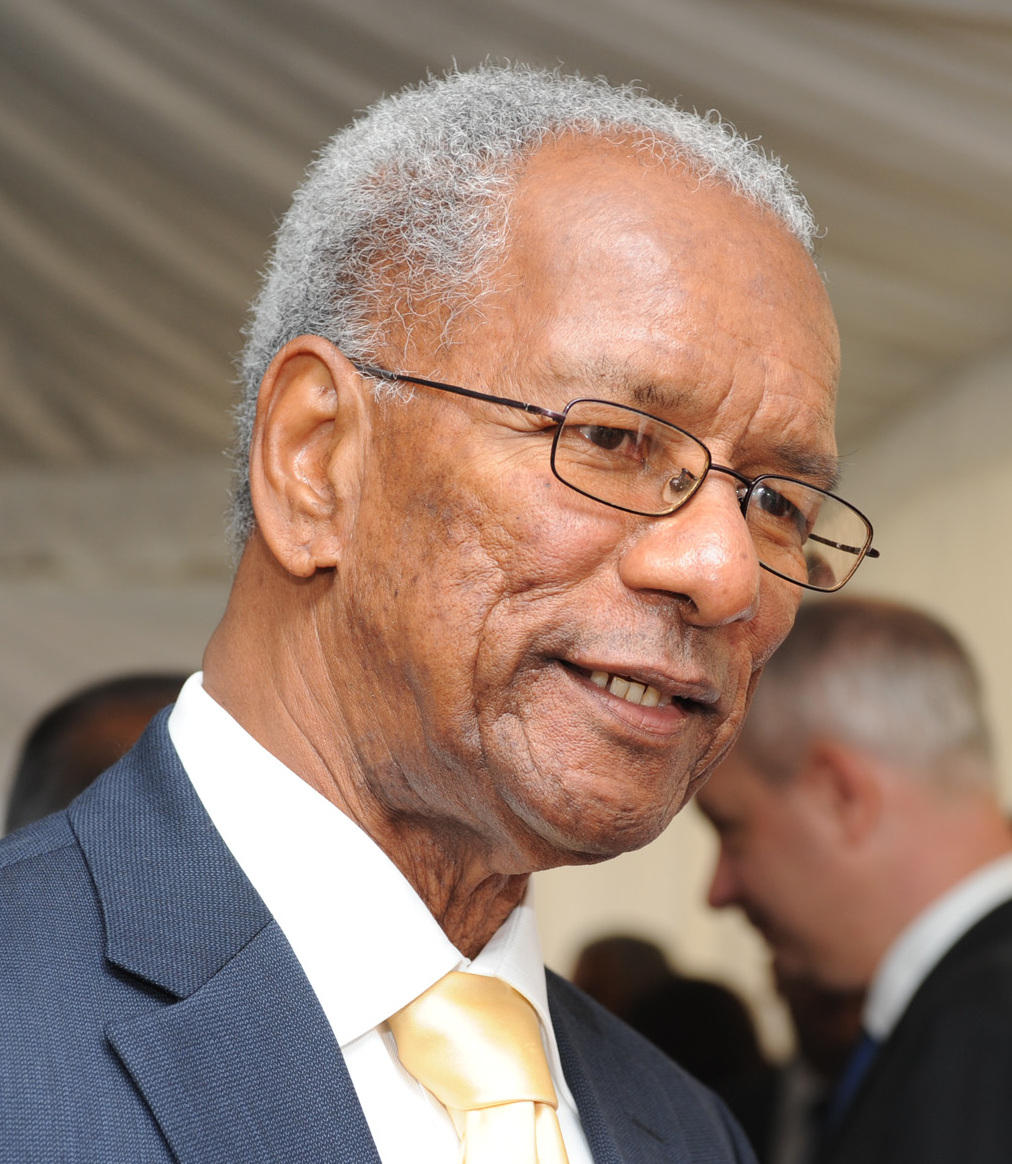

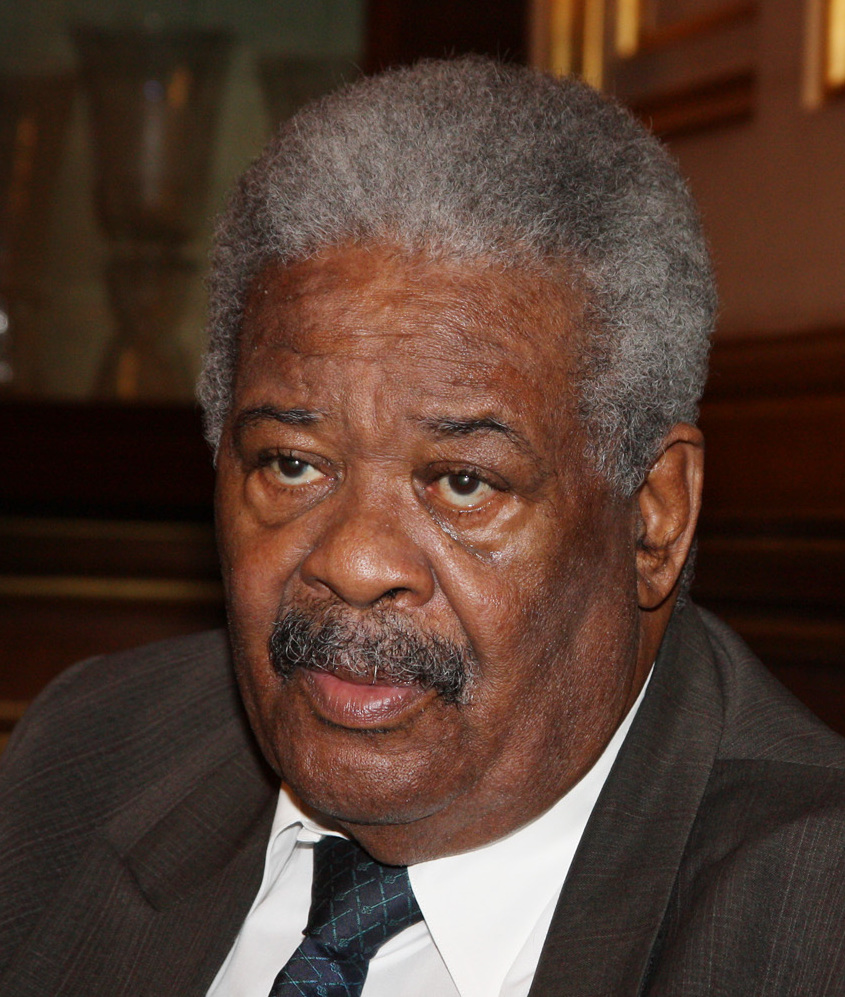
	First party	Second party
Leader	Orlando Smith	Ralph T. O'Neal
Party	NDP	VIP
Leader since	1999	1995
Leader's seat	At-large	9th District
Last election	38.14%, 5 seats	36.74%, 7 seats
Seats won	8	5
Seat change	▲3	▼2
Percentage	52.39%	42.22%
Chief Minister before election
Ralph T. O'Neal
VIP
Elected Chief Minister
Orlando Smith
NDP

General elections were held in the British Virgin Islands on 16 June 2003. It was won by the opposition National Democratic Party (NDP), which took 54.4% of the vote and 8 of the 13 available seats on the Legislative Council. After the election the NDP formed a Government for the first time in its history. Both major parties - the NDP and the Virgin Islands Party (VIP) actually increased their share of the overall vote at the expense of minority parties and independents. No independents or any minority parties won any seats. The NDP won all four of the territorial-at-large seats.

== Results ==
The NDP's victory was largely as a result of sweeping all four of the At-large seats. However, with each voter being able to cast four votes per ballot, the margin between the bottom NDP candidate (Paul Wattley) and the top VIP candidate (Reeial George) was a mere 41 votes, out of a total of 7,351 ballots cast (a margin of 0.5%). The other key win for the NDP was in the Fifth District where Delores Christopher carried the seat for the NDP by a wafer thin margin of just 3 votes in a constituency where a total of 20 ballots were rejected by elections officers.

Voters exercised a largely binary choice between the two main parties. No third party candidate or independent polled well in any area. In the Territorial seats, Alred Frett in the Fifth District was the highest vote-getter, with a mere 7.1% of the votes. In the At-large seats, the top eight spots went to the four candidates for each of the two main parties, with a massive drop off in numbers of votes for the ninth place candidate (Conrad Maduro, a former elected representative on the United Party ticket).

Party	District			At-large			Total seats	+/–
Party	Votes	%	Seats	Votes	%	Seats	Total seats	+/–
National Democratic Party	3,390	46.59	4	15,295	52.39	4	8	+3
Virgin Islands Party	3,799	52.21	5	12,325	42.22	0	5	–2
United Party				590	2.02	0	0	0
Independents	87	1.20	0	984	3.37	0	0	0
Speaker and Attorney General							2	0
Total	7,276	100.00	9	29,194	100.00	4	15	0
Valid votes	7,276	98.75		7,336	99.80			
Invalid/blank votes	92	1.25		15	0.20			
Total votes	7,368	100.00		7,351	100.00			
Registered voters/turnout	10,184	72.35		10,180	72.21			
Source: Elections in the Virgin Islands

=== District seats ===
1st District
Candidate	Party	Votes	%
Andrew Fahie	Virgin Islands Party	558	71.45
Archibald Christian	National Democratic Party	223	28.55
Total		781	100.00
Valid votes		781	99.24
Invalid/blank votes		6	0.76
Total votes		787	100.00
Registered voters/turnout		1,154	68.20

2nd District
Candidate	Party	Votes	%
Alvin Christopher	National Democratic Party	507	68.79
Kelvin Thomas	Virgin Islands Party	230	31.21
Total		737	100.00
Valid votes		737	99.33
Invalid/blank votes		5	0.67
Total votes		742	100.00
Registered voters/turnout		1,105	67.15

3rd District
Candidate	Party	Votes	%
Julian Fraser	Virgin Islands Party	473	59.27
Michael Thomas	National Democratic Party	325	40.73
Total		798	100.00
Valid votes		798	99.13
Invalid/blank votes		7	0.87
Total votes		805	100.00
Registered voters/turnout		1,058	76.09

4th District
Candidate	Party	Votes	%
Mark Vanterpool	Virgin Islands Party	511	60.26
Audley Maduro	National Democratic Party	337	39.74
Total		848	100.00
Valid votes		848	98.60
Invalid/blank votes		12	1.40
Total votes		860	100.00
Registered voters/turnout		1,172	73.38

5th District
Candidate	Party	Votes	%
Delores Christopher	National Democratic Party	362	46.53
Ethlyn Smith	Virgin Islands Party	359	46.14
Alred Frett	Independent	57	7.33
Total		778	100.00
Valid votes		778	97.49
Invalid/blank votes		20	2.51
Total votes		798	100.00
Registered voters/turnout		1,222	65.30

6th District
Candidate	Party	Votes	%
Omar Hodge	Virgin Islands Party	489	55.89
Walwyn Brewley	National Democratic Party	356	40.69
Leopold Richardson	Independent	30	3.43
Total		875	100.00
Valid votes		875	98.43
Invalid/blank votes		14	1.57
Total votes		889	100.00
Registered voters/turnout		1,289	68.97

7th District
Candidate	Party	Votes	%
Kedrick Pickering	National Democratic Party	452	63.22
Clinton George	Virgin Islands Party	263	36.78
Total		715	100.00
Valid votes		715	99.31
Invalid/blank votes		5	0.69
Total votes		720	100.00
Registered voters/turnout		941	76.51

8th District
Candidate	Party	Votes	%
Lloyd Black	National Democratic Party	458	58.87
Ray George	Virgin Islands Party	320	41.13
Total		778	100.00
Valid votes		778	98.86
Invalid/blank votes		9	1.14
Total votes		787	100.00
Registered voters/turnout		1,010	77.92

9th District
Candidate	Party	Votes	%
Ralph T. O'Neal	Virgin Islands Party	596	61.70
Hubert O'Neal	National Democratic Party	370	38.30
Total		966	100.00
Valid votes		966	98.57
Invalid/blank votes		14	1.43
Total votes		980	100.00
Registered voters/turnout		1,233	79.48

=== At-large seats ===
Candidate	Party	Votes	%
Orlando Smith	National Democratic Party	4,300	14.73
Ronnie W. Skelton	National Democratic Party	4,165	14.27
Eileene Parsons	National Democratic Party	3,515	12.04
Paul P. Wattley	National Democratic Party	3,315	11.36
Reeial George	Virgin Islands Party	3,274	11.21
Irene Penn-O'Neal	Virgin Islands Party	3,157	10.81
Elvis Harrigan	Virgin Islands Party	3,128	10.71
Roy Pickering	Virgin Islands Party	2,766	9.47
Conrad Maduro	BVI United Party	590	2.02
John I. Cline	Independent	450	1.54
Henry Einstein Kettle	Independent	220	0.75
Richard Courtney de Castro	Independent	172	0.59
Eileene E. Baronville	Independent	142	0.49
Total		29,194	100.00
Valid votes		7,336	99.80
Invalid/blank votes		15	0.20
Total votes		7,351	100.00
Registered voters/turnout		10,180	72.21
