= VI Democratic Party =

Political party of the British Virgin Islands

The VI Democratic Party (VIDP or DP) was a political party of the British Virgin Islands.

It was originally formed by Dr Q. William Osborne during the first session of the Legislative Council of the British Virgin Islands under the new constitution in 1967 subsequent to the general election on 14 April 1967. After the election Dr Osborne was the Territory's first leader of the opposition in the Legislative Council.

The VI Democratic Party only once held power in the Territory. After the 1971 general election it formed a coalition government with independent candidate Willard Wheatley, with Wheatley acting as Chief Minister. However, disagreements arose between Wheatley and Osborne, and Wheatley ended up removing Osborne from his Ministerial post. For the 1975 general election Wheatley abandoned his former coalition partners and ran successfully with the United Party, and Osborne also abandoned the party to run for the Virgin Islands Party.

The last election in which the VI Democratic Party contested was the 1979 general election, when Dr Osborne ran as a sole candidate in the 5th District, but was defeated by Cyril Romney.

== Electoral results ==
VI Democratic Party electoral history
Year	Leader	Seats (Available)	Percentage	Result
1967	Q.W. Osborne	2 (7)	31.3%	Lost; United Party
1971	Q.W. Osborne	3 (7)	--	Won; Plurality*
1975	did not field any candidates (Note: Although the VI Democratic Party did not officially contest the 1975 election, several longtime VIDP members contested the election and won seats: Q.W. Osborne (as an Independent), Austin Henley (as a United Party candidate) and Oliver Cills (unopposed, was not required to declare a party). After the election Austin Henley was appointed as leader of the opposition and recorded as a member of the VIDP; upon Henley's death Cills continued as leader of the opposition, also recorded as a VIDP member.)			
1979	Q.W. Osborne	0 (9)	--	Lost; Virgin Islands Party
* Coalition government with Willard Wheatley (Ind).
