= 1954 British Virgin Islands general election =

General elections were held in the British Virgin Islands in 1954 for seats on the Legislative Council of the British Virgin Islands.

The previous election in 1950 had elected four members to the council on the basis of a Territory-wide vote. The 1954 election was the first election to employ districting. The Territory was divided into five districts, the largest of which (the 2nd District - Road Town) would have two members. All seats were contested.

== Results ==
At the time candidates were not affiliated with political parties. Notable candidates who were elected for the first time included Theodolph Faulkner, remembered for his key role in relation to the reintroduction of democracy in the British Virgin Islands.

District	Member(s)
1st District	Wilfred W. Smith
2nd District (two members)	H.R. Penn, MBE
2nd District (two members)	Isaac G. Fonseca
3rd District	Edwin H. Leonard
4th District	Leslie Franklyn Malone
5th District	Theodolph Faulkner
Source: BVI Deputy Governor's Office
