= Virgin Islands Party =

- Chairman: Natalio Wheatley
- Founded: 2 March 1971
- Split from: United Party
- House of Assembly: 6 / 13

The Virgin Islands Party (VIP) is a political party in the British Virgin Islands. It is presently led by Natalio Wheatley. It is the oldest active political party in the British Virgin Islands, and it has won seven general elections, more than any other political party in the British Virgin Islands.

The party was founded by Lavity Stoutt in 1971 when Stoutt left the United Party in order to contest 1971 election after a dispute with Conrad Maduro as to who should be leader of the United Party. The Virgin Islands Party led by Stoutt lost to coalitions led by Willard Wheatley in the 1971 and 1975 general elections but triumphed in the 1979 general election. Stoutt continued to lead the party until his death in 1995. After Stoutt's death, leadership of the party fell to Ralph T. O'Neal who led it until he stepped down on 28 May 2014.

Prior to the 2011 general election the Virgin Islands Party had held power in the British Virgin Islands (BVI) for all except for 15 years since the adoption of the modern Legislative Council in 1967. Between its foundation in 1971 and 2014, the party had only two leaders: Lavity Stoutt and Ralph O'Neal; these two-party leaders are also the two longest serving elected politicians in BVI history and the first two leaders of the territory to have served more than two terms as either Chief Minister or Premier. On 28 May 2014 Julian Fraser took over from Ralph O'Neal, and led the party to defeat in the 2015 general election. On 30 November 2016 Andrew Fahie replaced Julian Fraser as party leader, making Fraser the first (and, so far, the only) leader of the Virgin Islands Party not to ascend to either the Chief Minister or Premiership.

The party most recently held power after the 2019 general election held on 25 February 2019 winning 8 seats out of 13.

Virgin Islands Party had held power continuously from 1986 until 2003, winning four consecutive general elections, which is the longest unbroken streak in government for a political party in the British Virgin Islands.

== Party leaders ==
The party has had five leaders in its history. Four of the five leaders have served as Chief Minister or Premier of the Virgin Islands on at least one occasion. All five leaders have been men. The party's early history was dominated by two men: Lavity Stoutt who founded the party and led it until his death in 2015, and Ralph O'Neal who led the party through the next four general elections. No other leader has led the party in more than one general election.

VIP Party Leaders
Term	Leader	General Elections Contested	General Elections Won
1971 - 1995	Lavity Stoutt	7	4
1995 - 2014	Ralph T. O'Neal	4	2
2014 - 2016	Julian Fraser	1	0
2016 - 2022	Andrew Fahie	1	1
2022–Present	Natalio Wheatley	1	1

== Electoral history ==
=== House of Assembly elections ===
Election	Party leader	Votes	%	Seats	+/–	Position	Government
1971	H. Lavity Stoutt			2 / 7	New	▲2nd	Opposition
1975	H. Lavity Stoutt	1,591	53.82%	3 / 7	▲1	▲1st	Opposition
1979	H. Lavity Stoutt	733	27.78%	4 / 9	▲1	1st	Majority government
1983	H. Lavity Stoutt	1,355	44.90%	4 / 9	0	1st	Opposition
1986	H. Lavity Stoutt	1,838	46.63%	5 / 9	▲1	1st	Majority government
1990	H. Lavity Stoutt	2,409	46.54%	6 / 9	▲1	1st	Supermajority government
1995	H. Lavity Stoutt	2,122	41.76%	6 / 13	0	1st	Majority government
1999	Ralph T. O'Neal	2,649	42.34%	7 / 13	▲1	1st	Majority government
2003	Ralph T. O'Neal	3,772	52.03%	5 / 13	▼2	▼2nd	Opposition
2007	Ralph T. O'Neal	3,838	52.63%	10 / 13	▲5	▲1st	Supermajority government
2011	Ralph T. O'Neal	3,864	43.59%	4 / 13	▼6	▼2nd	Opposition
2015	Julian Fraser	2,828	30.94%	2 / 13	▼2	2nd	Opposition
2019	Andrew Fahie	4,855	50.03%	8 / 13	▲6	▲1st	Majority government
2023	Natalio Wheatley	3,632	39.60%	6 / 13	▼2	1st	Coalition government
