= United Party (British Virgin Islands) =

The United Party (sometimes referred to as the BVI United Party) (or UP) was a political party of the British Virgin Islands.

It was formed by Conrad Maduro, H. Lavity Stoutt, Terrance B. Lettsome and Ivan Dawson during the first session of the Legislative Council of the British Virgin Islands under the new constitution in 1967 subsequent to the general election on 14 April 1967. Although Conrad Maduro was the President of the party, he did not win his seat at the 1967 general election, and so it was agreed that Lavity Stoutt would be appointed Chief Minister. Leading up to the 1971 general election Lavity Stoutt and Terrance Lettsome left the party to form the Virgin Islands Party, presumably for the ostensible reason of Stoutt seeking to remain as Chief Minister if Maduro should win his seat at the next election. Although Maduro did win his seat, the election was won by the rival VI Democratic Party.

The United Party held power three times in the Territory. Firstly, from its formation in 1967 until 1971. In 1975 it regained power as part of a coalition with Willard Wheatley until 1979. It regained power for the final time in November 1983 as part of a coalition with Cyril Romney. However, when Cyril Romney stepped down as Chief Minister and left the party, the party lost its overall majority and was replaced by the Virgin Islands Party, and never again emerged subsequently as a major political force.

The last election in which the United Party won a seat was the 1995 general election when Conrad Maduro and Andre Penn were the only candidates to win a seat. Although various candidates ran under the United Party banner in the 1999 general election, none were elected. In the 2003 general election only Conrad Maduro ran for the party (unsuccessfully). Maduro ran again in the 2005 by-election following the death of Paul Wattley (also unsuccessfully), and thereafter the United Party had ceased to function as a political party.

== Possible revival ==
In June 2014 Conrad Maduro announced his desire to return the United Party to political prominence, and confirmed that if selected as a candidate he would run in the next general election. It is unclear who the prospective candidates might be, but Maduro referred to the people expressing an interest as being "young people". In the end the party did not put any candidates forward at the 2015 election.

Another potential revival was also suggested in July 2018.

== Electoral results ==
United Party electoral history
Year	Leader	Seats (Available)	Percentage	Result
1967	H. Lavity Stoutt	4 (7)	42.8%	Won; Majority of 1
1971	Conrad Maduro	1 (7)	--	Lost; VI Democratic Party
1975	Conrad Maduro	3 (7)	31.7%	Won; Plurality*
1979	Conrad Maduro	0 (9)	6.7%	Lost; Virgin Islands Party
1983	Conrad Maduro	4 (9)	42.3%	Won; Plurality**
1986	Ralph T. O'Neal	2 (9)	24.3%	Lost; Virgin Islands Party
1990	Conrad Maduro	0 (9)	8.1%	Lost; Virgin Islands Party
1995	Conrad Maduro	1 (9)	16.5%	Lost; Virgin Islands Party
1999	Conrad Maduro	0 (9)	--	Lost; Virgin Islands Party
* Coalition government with Willard Wheatley (Ind) ** Coalition government with Cyril Romney (Ind)
