= Cyril Romney =

The Honourable Cyril Romney

Chief Minister of the British Virgin Islands
- In office 11 November 1983 – 17 November 1986
- Monarch: Elizabeth II
- Governor: David Robert Barwick
- Preceded by: Lavity Stoutt
- Succeeded by: Lavity Stoutt

Personal details
- Born: 1 March 1931 Tortola, British Virgin Islands
- Died: 19 July 2007 (aged 76) Florida, United States
- Spouse: Lillian Romney
- Children: Five

Cyril Brandtford Romney (1 March 1931 – 19 July 2007) was a British Virgin Islander politician who served as Chief Minister of the British Virgin Islands from 1983 to 1986. He also served as a member of the Legislative Council of the British Virgin Islands from 1979 to 1995. He was the first British Virgin Islander to hold the post of Financial Secretary, and was also a business leader in the Territory and the region.

After an early career as a teacher, he studied economics at Inter-American University of Puerto Rico and then pursued a master's program in economics and political science at Syracuse University in New York.

== Politics ==
Cyril Romney's first foray into politics was in 1975, when he stood as an independent candidate in the First District against Lavity Stoutt. He lost, but was subsequently elected in 1979 as the representative for the Fifth District and became a member of the opposition. He served a second political term from 1983 to 1986 and was Chief Minister of a coalition government with the United Party led by Willard Wheatley. During Romney's term as Chief Minister the International Business Companies Act, which was responsible for so much of the Territory's economic success, came into force.

In 1986 Romney's ruling coalition lost power after calling an early election, but he was re-elected and continued to serve on the opposition benches for two more consecutive terms. In both 1995 and 1999, he tried unsuccessfully to recapture the Fifth District seat standing on a pro-independence platform.

Romney was a permanent justice of the peace, a founding member of the Rotary Club of Tortola and a member of the BVI Chamber of Commerce and Hotel Association.

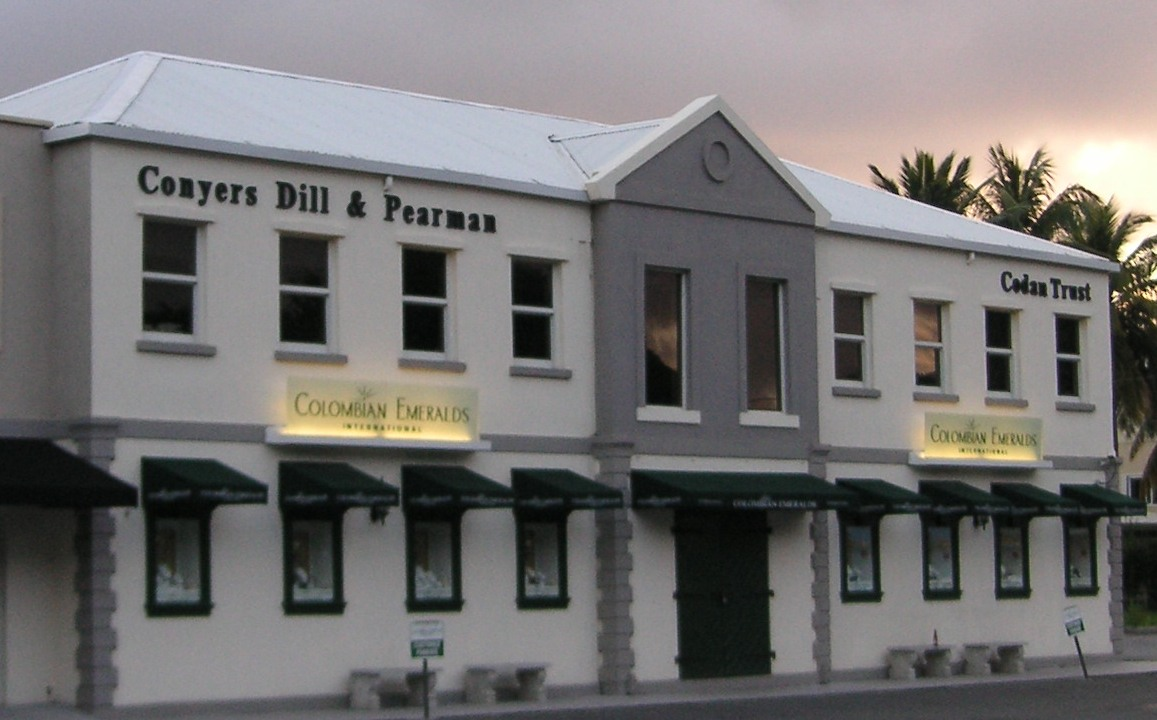
Colombian Emeralds in Road Town, one of Romney's business ventures

== Business interests ==
Romney had wide ranging commercial interests, including commercial and residential real estate development, and various aspects of the tourism industry. He was closely involved in the BVI's cruise ship industry; he founded a local travel agency, Travel Plan, in 1969 and a taxi company in 1979. He also purchased one of the Territory's major hotel chains, Prospect Reef, and opened a local franchise of Dolphin Discovery. He also opened the British Virgin Islands franchise of Colombian Emeralds International.

In addition to his commercial interests, Romney was for many years an active member of the British Virgin Islands Tourist Board and he initiated several strategies for promoting the Territory.

== Alleged money laundering ==
Whilst serving as Chief Minister Romney was the 99% owner of a trust company called Financial Management Trust, which had been linked with laundering drugs money. Although Romney was not personally implicated in the money laundering scheme, he was serving as Chief Minister at the time, the Legislative Council resolved to debate a no-confidence motion. To preempt the motion, Romney dissolved the Legislative Council and called a general election, which he lost.

Romney was never personally implicated, and argued that the day-to-day running of the company was conducted by the manager, Shaun Murphy, who later turned Queen's evidence in relation to the Brink's-Mat bullion robbery. Because of trade licensing laws in the British Virgin Islands it is not uncommon for prominent local businessmen to appear as owners of businesses where they have little to do with the running of the business. However Romney was not awarded the customary OBE given to political leaders in British Overseas Territories by the Queen.

== Death ==
Romney died on 19 July 2007 in a Florida hospital after a long battle with cancer. He was survived by his wife, former BVI First Lady Lillian Romney, five daughters, and several grandchildren. On his death he was given an official government funeral. Chief Minister Orlando Smith said Romney's death marked the end of an era for the British Virgin Islands, stating: "Our community lost a leader and a hero today."

=== Electoral history ===
Cyril Romney electoral history
Year	District	Party	Votes	Percentage	Winning or losing margin	Result
1975	1st District	Independent	111	24.9%	-223	Lost; H.L. Stoutt
1979	5th District	Independent	222	68.3%	+103	Won
1983	5th District	Independent	187	39.3%	+33	Won
1986	5th District	Independent	184	42.2%	+26	Won
1990	5th District	Independent	301	46.5%	+47	Won
1995	5th District	Independent	274	46.1%	-17	Lost; E.E. Smith
1999	5th District	Independent	233	31.8%	-45	Lost; E.E. Smith

== Sources ==
- British Virgin Islands Government Information Service - Press Release No 299R/07.
- Virgin Islands Daily News obituary

== Footnotes ==
Political offices
Preceded by Lavity Stoutt	Chief Minister of the British Virgin Islands; 1983-1986	Succeeded by Lavity Stoutt
Preceded by Conrad Maduro	Leader of the Opposition; 1990-1995	Succeeded by Walwyn Brewley
