= Hamilton Lavity Stoutt =

British Virgin Islander politician (1929–1995)

The Honourable H. Lavity Stouttt

Chief Minister of the British Virgin Islands
- In office 14 April 1967 – 2 June 1971
- Monarch: Elizabeth II
- Governor: Sir Ian Thomson
- Preceded by: New office
- Succeeded by: Willard Wheatley
- In office 12 November 1979 – 11 November 1983
- Governor: James Alfred Davidson, David Robert Barwick
- Preceded by: Willard Wheatley
- Succeeded by: Cyril Romney
- In office 17 November 1986 – 14 May 1995
- Governor: Mark Herdman, Peter Penfold
- Preceded by: Cyril Romney
- Succeeded by: Ralph T. O'Neal

Personal details
- Born: 7 March 1929 Tortola, British Virgin Islands
- Died: 14 May 1995 (aged 66) Tortola, British Virgin Islands
- Party: United Party; Virgin Islands Party
- Spouse: Hilda E. Stoutt (m. 1956)

Hamilton Lavity Stoutt (7 March 1929 – 14 May 1995) was a British Virgin Islander politician and the first and longest served Chief Minister of the British Virgin Islands. He won five general elections (1967, 1979, 1986, 1990 and 1995) and serving three non-consecutive terms of office from 1967 to 1971, again from 1979 to 1983 and again from 1986 until his death in 1995.

== Biography ==
=== Early life ===
Stoutt was born on 7 March 1929 in Long Bay, Tortola. He was the eighth child of Isaiah and Iallia Stoutt. He married Hilda E. Stoutt in 1956 and had three sons and three daughters. He was a staunch Methodist, and served as both a Sunday school superintendent and a lay preacher.

=== Career ===
Stoutt served as a parliamentarian in the Legislative Council from 1957 until 1967 prior to the adoption of the 1967 constitution, and at the time of his death was thought to be the longest serving Parliamentarian in the Caribbean. He was a founder of and the leader of the United Party, but after splitting from the party in 1971 went on to found the Virgin Islands Party.

Since Stoutt's death in 1995, a public holiday in the British Virgin Islands has been declared annually on the first Monday in the month of March in memory of his birthday.

The H. Lavity Stoutt Community College in Tortola bears his name. Stoutt himself left school after his primary school education, and obituary writers have suggested that it was his own lack of a formal education which so strongly inspired him to create and promote opportunities for BVIslanders to further their own educations.

During his lifetime, Lavity Stoutt was extremely fond of the quote from Proverbs 29:18 — "Where there is no vision, the people perish", a phrase he would recite frequently when arguing in favour of development projects.

== Electoral history ==
H. Lavity Stoutt electoral history
Year	District	Party	Votes	Percentage	Winning/losing margin	Result
1957	1st District	Non-party election	--	--	--	Won
1960	1st District	Non-party election	--	--	--	Won
1963	1st District	Non-party election	215	68.0%	+114	Won
1967	1st District	BVI United Party	221	65.4%	+54	Won
1971	1st District	Virgin Islands Party	--	--	--	Won
1975	1st District	Virgin Islands Party	334	75.1%	+223	Won
1979	1st District	Virgin Islands Party	328	57%	+72	Won
1983	1st District	Virgin Islands Party	421	53.0%	+85	Won
1986	1st District	Virgin Islands Party	416	64.9%	+203	Won
1990	1st District	Virgin Islands Party	520	85.8%	+464	Won
1995	1st District	Virgin Islands Party	489	68.3%	+292	Won

Lavity Stoutt's percentage of the votes in the 1990 general election remain records for a district seat in the British Virgin Islands (the margin of victory was a record at the time, but has since been surpassed). Stoutt's 11 electoral victories are also a record. Stoutt's 38 years as a parliamentarian was a record, but was surpassed by Ralph O'Neal in late 2013.

== Political offices ==
Political offices
Preceded by New office	Chief Minister of the British Virgin Islands; 1967–1971	Succeeded by Willard Wheatley
Preceded by Willard Wheatley	Chief Minister of the British Virgin Islands; 1979–1983	Succeeded by Cyril Romney
Preceded by Cyril Romney	Chief Minister of the British Virgin Islands; 1986–1995	Succeeded by Ralph T. O'Neal
Preceded by Q.W. Osborne	Leader of the Opposition; 1971-1975	Succeeded by Austin Henley
Preceded by Willard Wheatley	Leader of the Opposition; 1983-1986	Succeeded by Ralph T. O'Neal
Preceded by Wilfred W. Smith	Member for the 1st District; 1957-1995	Succeeded by Angel Smith
