= Willard Wheatley =

Chief Minister of the British Virgin Islands (1915–1997)

The Honourable Willard Wheatley

Chief Minister of the British Virgin Islands
- In office 2 June 1971 – 12 November 1979
- Monarch: Elizabeth II
- Governor: Derek George Cudmore; Walter Wilkinson Wallace; James Alfred Davidson
- Preceded by: Lavity Stoutt
- Succeeded by: Lavity Stoutt

Personal details
- Born: 16 July 1915 Tortola, British Virgin Islands
- Died: 22 January 1997 (aged 81) Tortola, British Virgin Islands
- Party: VI Democratic Party; United Party

Willard Wheatley MBE (16 July 1915 – 22 January 1997) was a British Virgin Islands educator and politician who served two consecutive terms as the Chief Minister of the British Virgin Islands from 1971 to 1979. He was the second ever Chief Minister of the Territory, and the first ever minister of finance. He served as Chief Minister at the head of two different coalition governments: one as de facto leader of the United Party, and the other the VI Democratic Party.

At an event to commemorate what would have been the 100th birthday of Wheatley, then Premier Orlando Smith made a commitment to provide public funds to memorialise his achievements and for a book about his life to be published.

His grandson Natalio Wheatley became Premier of the British Virgin Islands in May 2022.

== Electoral history ==
Willard Wheatley electoral history
Year	District	Party	Votes	Percentage	Winning/losing margin	Result
1971	6th District	Independent	--	--	--	Won
1975	6th District	BVI United Party	319	52.7%	+33	Won
1979	8th District	BVI United Party	Unopposed			Won
1983	8th District	BVI United Party	Unopposed			Won
1986	8th District	BVI United Party	166	47.6%	-12	Lost; L. Walters
1990	8th District	Progressive People's Democratic Party	139	26.5%	-175	Lost; L. Walters
1995	At-large	Independent	265	1.36%	-1,123*	Lost
* For at-large candidates (general elections) who won, this is the vote differential from the 5th placed candidate (i.e. the candidate with the highest number of votes who was not elected). For at-large candidates who lose, this is the vote differential from the 4th placed candidate (i.e. the candidate with the lowest number of votes who was elected).

== Political offices ==
Political offices
Preceded by Lavity Stoutt	Chief Minister of the British Virgin Islands; 1971–1979	Succeeded by Lavity Stoutt
Preceded by Oliver Cills	Leader of the Opposition; 1979-1983	Succeeded by Lavity Stoutt
