= Politics of the British Virgin Islands =

Politics of the British Virgin Islands takes place in a framework of a parliamentary representative democratic dependency, whereby the Premier is the head of government, and of a multi-party system. The British Virgin Islands (officially the "Virgin Islands") are an internally self-governing overseas territory of the United Kingdom. The United Nations Committee on Decolonization includes the islands on the United Nations list of non-self-governing territories. The Constitution of the Islands was introduced in 1971 and amended in 1979, 1982, 1991, 1994, 2000 and 2007. Executive power is exercised by the government. Legislative power is vested in both the government and the House of Assembly. The Judiciary is independent of the executive and the legislature. Military defence is the responsibility of the United Kingdom.

A new constitution was made in 2007 (the Virgin Islands Constitution Order 2007) and came into force after the Legislative Council (the former name of the House of Assembly) was dissolved for the 2007 general election.

== Executive branch ==
Main office-holders
| Office | Name | Party | Since |
|---|---|---|---|
| King | Charles III | | 8 September 2022 |
| Governor | Daniel Pruce | | 29 January 2024 |
| Premier | Natalio Wheatley | VIP | 5 May 2022 |

The Governor is appointed by the Monarch. The Premier (formerly Chief Minister) is appointed by the Governor from among the members of the Legislative Council, and is by parliamentary convention the leader of the party holding the largest number of seats.

The Cabinet (formerly named the Executive Council) is appointed by the Governor upon the advice of the Premier from amongst the elected members of the House of Assembly.

== Legislative branch ==
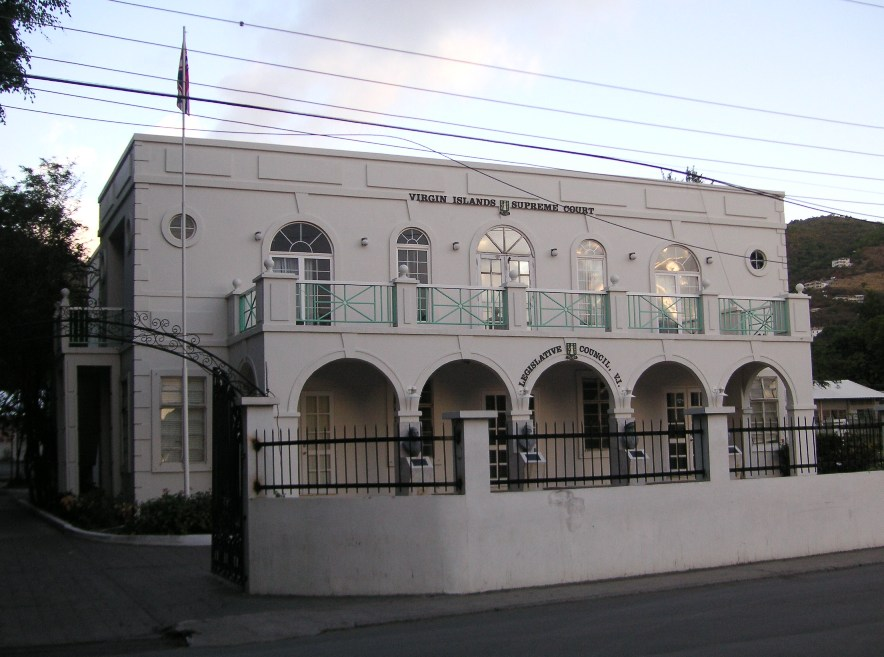
House of Assembly building in Road Town. The High Court sits upstairs.

The British Virgin Islands elects on territorial level a legislature. The House of Assembly (formerly Legislative Council) has 15 members, 13 members elected for a four-year term, 9 of them in single-seat constituencies and 4 at large, one ex officio member and one speaker chosen from outside the council.

=== "At large" seats ===
The 4 at large seats are a comparatively recent innovation in British Virgin Islands politics. They were introduced under some pressure from the British Foreign and Commonwealth Office in the mid-1990s. The rationale behind their introduction was that there was a risk that constituency seats can become too closely tied to a particular local figure, and that if a certain number of local figures join the same political party, then the voters have no real choice in selection of their government. Under the proposals any person in the Territory could stand as an at large candidate, and each voter would have four at large votes in addition to their constituency vote. The four at large candidates who received the highest total number of votes would be elected to the Legislative Council.

The proposals were strongly opposed by Lavity Stoutt, the Chief Minister of the day; he arranged for the entire Territory to be polled to ascertain how the voters felt about new rules being "foisted" upon them by the FCO in London, (Note: The results of the poll were largely inconclusive. Voters were asked if they would prefer (i) to have at large seats introduced, (ii) prefer not to have at large seats introduced, or (iii) no preference. The votes were almost equally split into thirds, but the largest proportion of the votes was in favour of introducing at large seats. Nonetheless, Lavity Stoutt cited the poll as an indication that over half the population either did not want change, or had no preference, and thus constitutional change was inappropriate.) and then later flew to London with an entire delegation (including the Attorney General) to try to dissuade them. Despite this opposition the at large seats were introduced.

Although Lavity Stoutt died shortly after the first election with at large seats in 1995, his fears proved to be well founded. Although his Virgin Islands Party was returned to power in 1995, and retained power in the following election under the leadership of Ralph T. O'Neal in 1999, the at-large seats have since become a stronghold for the opposition National Democratic Party.

=== List of Members ===
| Name | Party | Member of | First elected | Title | Previous Roles | Constituency |
|---|---|---|---|---|---|---|
| Karl Dawson | VIP | Government | 2023–present | | | First District |
| Melvin Turnbull | PVIM | Opposition | 2015–present | | | Second District |
| Julian Fraser | PU | Opposition | 1999–present | | | Third District |
| Luce Hodge-Smith | VIP | Government | 2023–present | | | Fourth District |
| Kye Rymer | VIP | Government | 2019–present | | | Fifth District |
| Myron Walwyn | NDP | Opposition | 2023–present | | | Sixth District |
| Natalio Wheatley | VIP | Government | 2019–present | Premier | | Seventh District |
| Marlon Penn | NDP | Opposition | 2011–present | | | Eighth District |
| Vincent Wheatley | VIP | Government | 2019–present | | | Ninth District |
| Sharie de Castro | VIP | Government | 2019–present | | | Territorial At-Large |
| Lorna Smith | VIP | Government | 2023–present | | | Territorial At-Large |
| Ronnie Skelton | PVIM | Opposition | 2023–present | | | Territorial At-Large |
| Stacy Mather | PVIM | Opposition | 2023–present | | | Territorial At-Large |
| Corine George-Massicote | None | Independent | 2022–present | Speaker of the House | | Appointed |
| Dawn Smith | None | Independent | 2020–present | Attorney General | | Appointed |

== Political parties and elections ==
The two main political parties in the British Virgin Islands at present at the Virgin Islands Party (VIP) and the National Democratic Party (NDP). The only parties other than the VIP and the NDP which has ever won power at a general election in the British Virgin Islands is the now defunct United Party, which won the 1967, 1975 and 1983 general elections, and the now defunct VI Democratic Party, which won the 1971 general election as part of a coalition government.

Political parties in the British Virgin Islands are not generally formed on an ideological basis, and do not normally affiliate themselves with a political school of thought. Political parties do not identify themselves are being on the political right or the political left. Similarly parties do not normally identify themselves with mainstream political movement such as green politics. Although there are no religious parties in the British Virgin Islands, all parties typically identify themselves with Christianity. Most parties campaign on a concepts with close affinity to nationalism, and core competency in relation to administration of Government. Because of the high numbers of economic migrants in the British Virgin Islands, much political campaigning has a xenophobic tinge to it, and often focuses on political patronage for BVIslanders.

=== Crossing the floor ===
There is relatively little party loyalty in the British Virgin Islands (which may be reflective of the lack of party ideology), and most significant elected politicians have changed party allegiance at least once, and sometimes more frequently, during their careers. Notable politicians who have switched parties include:

| Politician | Details |
|---|---|
| Lavity Stoutt | Former Chief Minister. Founded the United Party in 1967 and contested the 1967 general election. In 1971 left the United Party to form the Virgin Islands Party. |
| Terrance B. Lettsome | Former Minister. Member of the United Party in 1967 and contested the 1967 general election. In 1971 left the United Party to form the Virgin Islands Party. |
| Q.W. Osborne | Former Minister and Leader of the Opposition. Founded the VI Democratic Party, and served as Leader of the Opposition and Minister for Natural Resources and Public Health. Left the party in 1972 and joined the Virgin Islands Party to contest the 1975 general election. Subsequently, left and re-joined the VI Democratic Party. |
| Willard Wheatley | Former Chief Minister. Won the 1971 general election in a coalition with the VI Democratic Party. Left the VI Democratic Party to join United Party and led them to general election victory in 1975. In 1990 left the United Party to form the Progressive People's Democratic Party. |
| Ralph T. O'Neal | Former Chief Minister and Premier. Contested the 1971 general election on behalf of the VI Democratic Party. Subsequently, ran as an independent before joining the Virgin Islands Party in 1983. Left and joined the United Party for the 1986 general election and served as leader of the opposition. Left the United Party in 1988 to rejoin the Virgin Islands Party for a ministerial seat. |
| Oliver Cills | Former Minister. Contested the 1971 and 1975 general elections on behalf of the VI Democratic Party and served as party leader and leader of the opposition after the death of Austin Henley. Subsequently joined the Virgin Islands Party and contested the 1986, 1990 and 1995 elections on behalf of the Virgin Islands Party. |
| Alvin Christopher | Former Minister. Initially elected as an independent. Joined the Virgin Islands Party for a ministerial seat. Left the Virgin Islands Party and joined the National Democratic Party. Left the National Democratic Party and rejoined the Virgin Islands Party. Left the Virgin Islands Party to form the People's Empowerment Party. |
| Eileene L. Parsons | Former Minister. Initially elected as an independent. Joined the Virgin Islands Party for a ministerial seat. Left the Virgin Islands Party in July 2000 and joined the National Democratic Party. |
| Omar Hodge | Former Minister. Initially ran as an independent. Joined the Virgin Islands Party in 2001. Left the Virgin Islands Party in 1988 and contested the 1990 election for the Independent People's Movement. Rejoined the Virgin Islands Party prior to the 1995 election. |
| Mark Vanterpool | Minister for Communication and Works. Initially elected as a member of National Democratic Party in 1999. Joined the Virgin Islands Party in 2001. Left the Virgin Islands Party in 2007 and re-joined the National Democratic Party. |
| Julian Fraser | Initially elected as member of the Virgin Islands Party and served as party leader. Left to form his own party in 2018. |
| Ronnie Skelton | Initially elected as a member of the National Democratic Party and served as a Minister. Left to form his own party in 2019. |
| Alvera Maduro-Caines | Initially elected as a member of the National Democratic Party. Left to join the Virgin Islands Party in 2020. |
| Shereen Flax-Charles | Initially elected as a member of the Virgin Islands Party. Crossed the floor to join the PVIM. |
| Lorna Smith | Contested the 2023 general election as a member of the National Democratic Party. Crossed the floor the day after the election to join the Virgin Islands Party in government. |

== Judicial branch ==
The British Virgin Islands is a member state of the Eastern Caribbean Supreme Court. Judges in the British Virgin Islands are appointed rather than elected politically. By convention, judges on the Eastern Caribbean are always appointed to sit outside of the jurisdiction they are from to minimise the possibility of political interference with the judiciary.

== International organization participation ==
Caricom (associate), CDB, ECLAC (associate), Interpol (subbureau), IOC, OECS (associate), UNESCO (associate)
