= 2023 British Virgin Islands general election =

- 24 April 2023

All 13 elected seats in the House of Assembly 7 seats needed for a majority
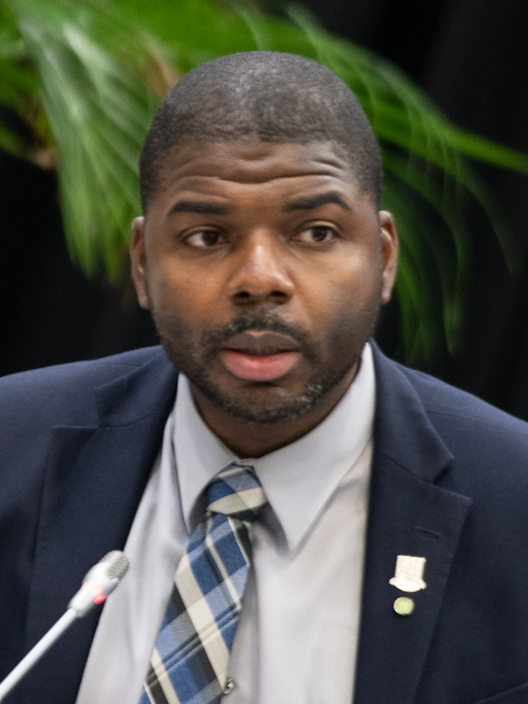

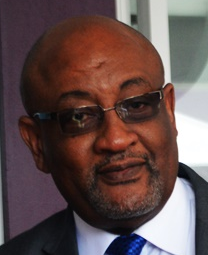

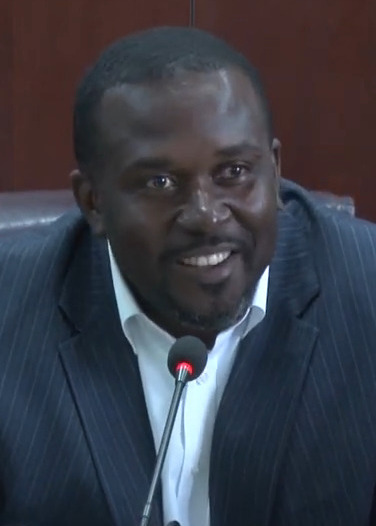

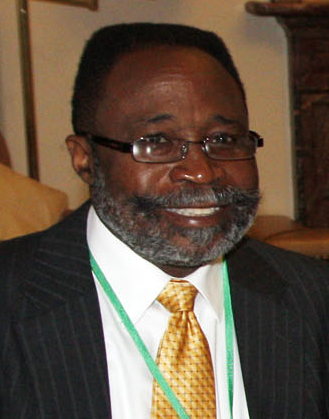
| | First party | Second party |
|---|---|---|
| Leader | Natalio Wheatley | Ronnie Skelton |
| Party | VIP | PVIM |
| Last election | 8 seats | 1 seat |
| Seats won | 6 | 3 |
| Seat change | ▼2 | ▲2 |
| | Third party | Fourth party |
| Leader | Marlon Penn | Julian Fraser |
| Party | NDP | PU |
| Last election | 3 seats | 1 seat |
| Seats won | 3 | 1 |
| Seat change | Steady | Steady |
Premier before election
Natalio Wheatley
Virgin Islands Party
Premier after election
Natalio Wheatley
Virgin Islands Party

General elections were held in the British Virgin Islands on 24 April 2023. The governing Virgin Islands Party (VIP) remained the largest party in the House of Assembly but lost its majority resulting in a hung parliament.

The VIP won six seats, with the Progressive Virgin Islands Movement (PVIM) and the National Democratic Party (NDP) each winning three seats, and Progressives United (PU) winning a single seat. There followed a period of intense discussions between the party to either individually attract members or to try and form a coalition between parties. In the end former first lady Lorna Smith agreed that she would join the VIP as a single person in coalition to give them a working majority and keep them in power.

== Background ==
The House of Assembly normally sits in four-year terms. The Governor must dissolve the House within four years of the date when the House first meets after a general election unless it has been dissolved sooner. Once the House is dissolved a general election must be held after at least 21 days, but not more than two months after the dissolution of the House.

The elections are the first since the 2021 Commission of Inquiry which recommended the suspension of the Territory's constitution after finding that "[a]lmost everywhere, the principles of good governance, such as openness, transparency and even the rule of law, are ignored". Ultimately the UK government did not act upon that recommendation. In response to the report the Territory formed a "unity government" including members of the opposition National Democratic Party (NDP) and Progressive Virgin Islands Movement (PVIM) in the Cabinet.

The elections followed the arrest of the country's Premier Andrew Fahie, in Miami on charges relating to drug smuggling. Fahie was removed as Premier, representative of the First District, and leader of his political party. Natalio Wheatley succeeded him as Premier and party leader.

== Electoral system ==
The House of Assembly has a total of 15 members, 13 of whom are members elected by the public to serve a four-year term, plus two ex-officio non-voting members: the Attorney General and the Speaker of the House. Of the 13 elected members, nine are elected via first-past-the-post voting to represent territorial district seats, and four are elected on a territory-wide "at-large" basis via plurality block voting.

Although there was a delay in announcing the date of the elections, campaigning began some weeks before the it was announced. After the House of Assembly was dissolved for the election on 10 March 2023 there was then a short delay before the election date was confirmed.

== Parties and candidates ==
=== Virgin Islands Party ===
The incumbent Virgin Islands Party (VIP) was led by Fahie in the previous general election, but following his arrest on charges of drug smuggling offences, leadership of the party passed to Wheatley. The party was the only political party to contest every single seat.

=== National Democratic Party ===
The NDP is led by Marlon Penn (D8). They fielded nine candidates.

=== Progressive Virgin Islands Movement ===
The leader of the PVIM, Ronnie Skelton, failed to win a seat in the 2019 election, and so Mitch Turnbull (D2) assumed leadership of the party in the House. However, for the 2023 campaign Skelton resumed leadership of the party. The party's ranks were also bolstered when representative Shereen Flax-Charles (at-large) crossed the floor to join the PVIM.

=== Progressives United ===
Julian Fraser, the current Leader of the Opposition by default being the only member of the House of Assembly not in the "unity government", is the leader and only sitting member of the Progressives United (PU). On 1 April 2023 the PU announced a 'soft alliance' with the PVIM. No PU candidates were announced other than Fraser.

=== Candidates stepping down ===
Mark Vanterpool (NDP) confirmed that he would not be defending his District 4 seat and was retiring from politics.

=== Candidates crossing the floor ===
a number of candidates were contesting the elections for new parties having "crossed the floor" after being originally elected representing a different party. Flax-Charles left the ruling VIP to join the PVIM, and former NDP representative, Alvera Maduro-Caines, left her party to join the VIP.

== Developments ==
=== Merger talks ===
The NDP and PVIM conducted exploratory merger talks, but ultimately those talks were not successful. The PVIM had originally been formed when a number of members of the NDP split away and formed a competing party before the 2019 election. Despite the absence of any formal alliance, it is noteworthy that in only two of the nine districts are candidates from the two parties contesting against each other.

On 1 April 2023 the PVIM subsequently announced a 'soft alliance' with the PU. No PU party candidates were announced other than Fraser in District 3.

== Platforms and election conduct ==
=== Polling ===
No public polling was published.

=== Policies and platforms ===
None of the political parties published a political manifesto, but a number of issues arose in press commentary and at party rallies.

Opposition parties campaigned on Fahle's arrest and the findings of the commission of inquiry relating to corruption , treating the election as "a referendum on the corrupt VIP and the corrupt Premier". Former VIP leader, Fraser, said the party has no place in government.

Another sensitive issue which was discussed is the controversial Retiring Allowances (Legislative Services) Amendment Act, 2021 which gave extremely generous payments over a number of years to retiring members of the House of Assembly. The NDP pledged to repeal the Act, calling "political wickedness and greed". The VIP in response accused NDP politicians of profiting equally from the act despite criticising it.

The PVIM indicated that it would make reform of the NHI scheme a priority commitment in government. Party leader, Skelton, spent eight years as Minister for Health in an NDP-led government.

=== Bribery allegations ===
Allegations of political candidates or their paying persons to vote for them were reported in local news. The allegation was made by Flax-Charles, a PVIM candidate, during a radio broadcast. She did not name any politicians or agents, but did say that it related to residents in Virgin Gorda. She also did not clarify whether she had reported her concerns to the Electoral Commissioner, the allegations remained unresolved.

== Results ==
| Party | District | | | At-large | | | Total seats | +/– |
| Party | Votes | % | Seats | Votes | % | Seats | Total seats | +/– |
|---|---|---|---|---|---|---|---|---|
| Virgin Islands Party | 3,632 | 39.60 | 5 | 11,576 | 31.90 | 1 | 6 | –2 |
| Progressive Virgin Islands Movement | 1,439 | 15.69 | 1 | 12,405 | 34.18 | 2 | 3 | +2 |
| National Democratic Party | 2,668 | 29.09 | 2 | 9,464 | 26.08 | 1 | 3 | 0 |
| Progressives United | 459 | 5.00 | 1 | | | | 1 | 0 |
| Independents | 973 | 10.61 | 0 | 2,844 | 7.84 | 0 | 0 | 0 |
| Speaker and Attorney General | | | | | | | 2 | 0 |
| Total | 9,171 | 100.00 | 9 | 36,289 | 100.00 | 4 | 15 | 0 |
| Valid votes | 9,171 | 98.88 | | 36,289 | 97.81 | | | |
| Invalid/blank votes | 104 | 1.12 | | 811 | 2.19 | | | |
| Total votes | 9,275 | 100.00 | | 37,100 | 100.00 | | | |
| Registered voters/turnout | 16,130 | 57.50 | | | | | | |
Source: Government of the British Virgin Islands, BVI Platinum

=== District seats ===
First District
| Candidate | Party | Votes | % | Notes |
|---|---|---|---|---|
| Karl Dawson | Virgin Islands Party | 452 | 52.25 | Elected |
| Sylvia Moses | Progressive Virgin Islands Movement | 260 | 30.06 | |
| Chad George | Independent | 153 | 17.69 | |
| Total | | 865 | 100.00 | |
| Valid votes | | 865 | 99.43 | |
| Invalid/blank votes | | 5 | 0.57 | |
| Total votes | | 870 | 100.00 | |

Karl Dawson won the seat formerly held by Fahie. Outside of by-elections, he becomes only the third person after Fahie and Lavity Stoutt to win District One in its history.

Second District
| Candidate | Party | Votes | % | Notes |
|---|---|---|---|---|
| Melvin Turnbull Jr. | Progressive Virgin Islands Movement | 560 | 57.20 | Re-elected |
| Troy Christopher | Independent | 303 | 30.95 | |
| Marieta Flax-Headley | Virgin Islands Party | 116 | 11.85 | |
| Total | | 979 | 100.00 | |
| Valid votes | | 979 | 99.90 | |
| Invalid/blank votes | | 1 | 0.10 | |
| Total votes | | 980 | 100.00 | |

Incumbent Melvin Turnbull won the Second District for the third time in a row.

Third District
| Candidate | Party | Votes | % | Notes |
|---|---|---|---|---|
| Julian Fraser | Progressives United | 459 | 46.27 | Re-elected |
| Aaron Parillon | National Democratic Party | 347 | 34.98 | |
| Kevin "OJ" Smith | Virgin Islands Party | 186 | 18.75 | |
| Total | | 992 | 100.00 | |
| Valid votes | | 992 | 98.61 | |
| Invalid/blank votes | | 14 | 1.39 | |
| Total votes | | 1,006 | 100.00 | |

Incumbent Fraser won District Three for the seventh time in a row. His seven general election wins are fourth most in BVI history.

Fourth District
| Candidate | Party | Votes | % | Notes |
|---|---|---|---|---|
| Luce Hodge-Smith | Virgin Islands Party | 322 | 42.15 | Elected |
| Sandy Harrigan-Underhill | National Democratic Party | 285 | 37.30 | |
| Ian Smith | Progressive Virgin Islands Movement | 145 | 18.98 | |
| Rosita Scatliffe-Thompson | Independent | 12 | 1.57 | |
| Total | | 764 | 100.00 | |
| Valid votes | | 764 | 99.35 | |
| Invalid/blank votes | | 5 | 0.65 | |
| Total votes | | 769 | 100.00 | |

Luce Hodge-Smith (VIP) won the 4th District at her second attempt.

Fifth District
| Candidate | Party | Votes | % | Notes |
|---|---|---|---|---|
| Kye Rymer | Virgin Islands Party | 840 | 71.07 | Re-elected |
| Marvin Blyden | Progressive Virgin Islands Movement | 342 | 28.93 | |
| Total | | 1,182 | 100.00 | |
| Valid votes | | 1,182 | 98.25 | |
| Invalid/blank votes | | 21 | 1.75 | |
| Total votes | | 1,203 | 100.00 | |

Incumbent Kye Rymer defended his seat.

Sixth District
| Candidate | Party | Votes | % | Notes |
|---|---|---|---|---|
| Myron Walwyn | National Democratic Party | 736 | 63.72 | Elected |
| Alvera Maduro-Caines | Virgin Islands Party | 419 | 36.28 | Unseated |
| Total | | 1,155 | 100.00 | |
| Valid votes | | 1,155 | 98.38 | |
| Invalid/blank votes | | 19 | 1.62 | |
| Total votes | | 1,174 | 100.00 | |

Former NDP party leader, Myron Walwyn, won over incumbent, Maduro-Caines.

Seventh District
| Candidate | Party | Votes | % | Notes |
|---|---|---|---|---|
| Natalio Wheatley | Virgin Islands Party | 487 | 57.03 | Re-elected |
| Perline Scatliffe-Leonard | Independent | 367 | 42.97 | |
| Total | | 854 | 100.00 | |
| Valid votes | | 854 | 97.71 | |
| Invalid/blank votes | | 20 | 2.29 | |
| Total votes | | 874 | 100.00 | |

Incumbent Wheatley defeated his lone challenger in District Seven.

Eighth District
| Candidate | Party | Votes | % | Notes |
|---|---|---|---|---|
| Marlon Penn | National Democratic Party | 885 | 73.50 | Re-elected |
| Allen Wheatley | Virgin Islands Party | 319 | 26.50 | |
| Total | | 1,204 | 100.00 | |
| Valid votes | | 1,204 | 98.69 | |
| Invalid/blank votes | | 16 | 1.31 | |
| Total votes | | 1,220 | 100.00 | |

Marlon Penn won his fourth consecutive contest in District Eight, continuing the Penn family domination of that seat.

Ninth District
| Candidate | Party | Votes | % | Notes |
|---|---|---|---|---|
| Vincent Wheatley | Virgin Islands Party | 491 | 41.75 | Re-elected |
| Coy Levens | National Democratic Party | 415 | 35.29 | |
| Shereen Flax-Charles | Progressive Virgin Islands Movement | 239 | 20.32 | |
| Vernon Vanterpool | Independent | 31 | 2.64 | |
| Total | | 1,176 | 100.00 | |
| Valid votes | | 1,176 | 99.75 | |
| Invalid/blank votes | | 3 | 0.25 | |
| Total votes | | 1,179 | 100.00 | |

Vincent Wheatley held on to his seat amid a crowded field as Coy Levens and Flax-Charles split the anti-government vote.

=== At-large seats ===
the four at-large seats were split amongst three different parties. Incumbent Sharie de Castro was returned, but other VIP incumbents Neville Smith and Carvin Malone were ousted. Skelton returns to the house after losing his seat in 2019, and is joined by new member Stacy "Buddha" Mather. Former first lady Lorna Smith also won for the first time in her first contest for the NDP.

| Candidate | Party | Votes | % | Notes |
|---|---|---|---|---|
| Stacy "Buddha" Mather | Progressive Virgin Islands Movement | 3,617 | 9.97 | Elected |
| Lorna Smith | National Democratic Party | 3,578 | 9.86 | Elected |
| Sharie De Castro | Virgin Islands Party | 3,471 | 9.56 | Re-elected |
| Ronnie Skelton | Progressive Virgin Islands Movement | 3,332 | 9.18 | Elected |
| Neville Smith | Virgin Islands Party | 2,978 | 8.21 | Unseated |
| Kedrick Pickering | National Democratic Party | 2,860 | 7.88 | |
| Shaina Smith-Archer | Progressive Virgin Islands Movement | 2,781 | 7.66 | |
| Zoe Walcott | Virgin Islands Party | 2,697 | 7.43 | |
| Ingrid Moses-Scatliffe | Progressive Virgin Islands Movement | 2,675 | 7.37 | |
| Carvin Malone | Virgin Islands Party | 2,430 | 6.70 | Unseated |
| Renard Estridge | National Democratic Party | 1,630 | 4.49 | |
| Daniel Fligelston-Davies | Independent | 1,490 | 4.11 | |
| Allen O'Neal | National Democratic Party | 1,396 | 3.85 | |
| Lesmore Smith | Independent | 851 | 2.35 | |
| Karen Vanterpool | Independent | 244 | 0.67 | |
| Mitsy Ellis-Simpson | Independent | 164 | 0.45 | |
| Ishmael Brathwaite | Independent | 95 | 0.26 | |
| Total | | 36,289 | 100.00 | |
| Valid votes | | 36,289 | 97.81 | |
| Invalid/blank votes | | 811 | 2.19 | |
| Total votes | | 37,100 | 100.00 | |

== Aftermath ==
=== Coalition discussions ===
Because of the division of seats, no party had won overall control of the House of Assembly. There followed a period of intense discussions between the parties to either pry away members or to try and form a coalition between parties. Within 24 hours Lorna Smith, who campaigned as a member of the NDP (and whose husband had led three NDP governments), agreed that she would join the VIP as a single person in coalition to give them a working majority and keep them in power. Almost immediately there followed an announcement that she would be the Deputy Premier in the new government.

=== Cabinet ===
the new government and ministers were sworn in but without confirming ministerial portfolios. Party leader, Natalio Wheatley, was sworn in as Premier, and Lorna Smith was sworn in as Deputy Premier. Kye Rymer, Vincent Wheatley and Sharie de Castro were also sworn in as Ministers but without specifying their portfolios, and Karl Dawson and Luce Hodge-Smith were sworn in as Junior Ministers. This effectively brought an end to the cross-party "unity government" which was put in place following the 2021 Commission of Inquiry.

Cabinet of the British Virgin Islands
| Office | Members | Notes |
|---|---|---|
| Premier | Natalio Wheatley | Minister of Finance |
| Governor | John Rankin | |
| Ministers | Lorna Smith | Deputy Premier; Minister for Financial Services, Labour and Trade |
| Ministers | Kye Rymer | Minister for Communications and Works |
| Ministers | Sharie de Castro | Minister for Education, Youth Affairs and Sports |
| Ministers | Vincent Wheatley | Minister for Health and Welfare |
| Junior Ministers | Karl Dawson | Junior Minister for Agriculture and Fisheries |
| Junior Ministers | Luce Hodge-Smith | Junior Minister for Culture and Tourism |
| Attorney General | Dawn Smith | Ex-officio, non-voting |
| Cabinet Secretary | Sandra Ward | |

Ronnie Skelton was confirmed as the Leader of the Opposition.

=== Other ===
The Premier, Natalio Wheatley, called upon all parties to put the election behind them and move forward together.

local commentary on the election focused on when Lorna Smith switched from a lifetime supporting the NDP to join the VIP - a party she had repeatedly and loudly attacked throughout her campaign. Shortly after the election the NDP announced that she was being expelled from the party.

Separately, the Supervisor for Elections called for a wholesale reform of the Election Act ahead of the next general election.
