= Cabinet of the British Virgin Islands =

Collective decision-making body of the British Virgin Islands government

The Cabinet of the British Virgin Islands (formerly referred to as the Executive Council, or sometimes ExCo) is the collective decision-making body of the British Virgin Islands government. It is composed of the Premier, four other Ministers of Government, and the Attorney General as an ex officio, non-voting, member. The Governor attends and presides over meetings of Cabinet where possible. The Cabinet has responsibility for the formulation of policy, including directing the implementation of such policy, insofar as it relates to every aspect of government, except those matters for which are reserved to the Governor under the Constitution. The Cabinet is collectively responsible to the House of Assembly for such policies and their implementation.

The Cabinet is supported by a Cabinet Secretary, who summons meetings of Cabinet. The agenda of Cabinet is set by the Cabinet Steering Committee, which consists of the Cabinet Secretary, the Governor, and the Premier. Each of the governors and the Premier has the authority to add matters to the Cabinet agenda.

== Current members ==
The following Cabinet was provisionally announced on 25 April 2023 following the general election, but without specifying the exact Ministerial portfolios, but these were confirmed a few days later. This effectively brought an end to the cross-party "unity government" which was put in place following the 2021 Commission of Inquiry.

Cabinet of the British Virgin Islands
Office	Members	Notes
Premier	Natalio Wheatley	Minister of Finance
Governor	Daniel Pruce	
Ministers	Lorna Smith	Deputy Premier; Minister for Financial Services, Labour and Trade
Ministers	Kye Rymer	Minister for Communications and Works
Ministers	Sharie de Castro	Minister for Education, Youth Affairs and Sports
Ministers	Vincent Wheatley	Minister for Health and Welfare
Junior Ministers	Karl Dawson	Junior Minister for Agriculture and Fisheries
Junior Ministers	Luce Hodge-Smith	Junior Minister for Culture and Tourism
Attorney General	Dawn Smith	Ex-officio, non-voting
Cabinet Secretary	Sandra Ward	

== History ==
Along with other political institutions in the British Virgin Islands, the role of the Cabinet or Executive Council has evolved.

The first ever Executive Council was formed on 30 November 1773, and consisted initially of twelve members, all nominated by the Governor (who at this time had regional responsibility for the Territory, but was based in St Kitts). At the same time the first Legislative Council was elected. For a while these organs were successful, but they withered in line with other political institutions during the economic decline of the British Virgin Islands in the 1800s such that by 1867 the Legislature at least was no longer functional. In 1871 a single federal colony was formed for British dominions in the Caribbean but, tellingly, the British Virgin Islands was not represented by a member. The Executive Council was formally abolished in 1902.

When democracy was reintroduced into the British Virgin Islands in 1950 following the 1950 general election there was no Executive Council to accompany the new Legislative Council. However, after the 1957 general election an Executive Council was formed by the Administrator of the British Virgin Islands, two other "Ministers" appointed by the Administrator, and two ex officio members, the Financial Secretary and "Attorney General". Those terms did not exactly exist in their present form at the time: there were no Ministers before 1967, but certain members were appointed with Ministerial type responsibilities. Similarly, there was no formal Attorney General until 1967 either, but Herman A. Besson filled that role under the slightly less grand title of Legal Assistant. The members of the first-ever Executive Council of the British Virgin Islands were: Geoffrey Pole Allesbrook (Administrator), H.R. Penn (Member for Trade and Production), Glanville Fonseca (Member for Works and Communications), Dennis S. Mordecai (Financial Official, ex officio), and Herman A. Besson (Legal Assistant, ex officio).

Over the ensuing years, the composition of the Executive Council gradually morphed, vesting more responsibility in the Legislative Council, and then after the introduction of Ministerial rule in 1967, the Chief Minister. Following the 1967 general election, it would take the form that it would broadly follow for the next 50 years:

- Governor
- Chief Minister
- Two other Ministers appointed by the Governor on the advice of the Chief Minister
- Two ex officio non-voting members, the Financial Secretary and the Attorney General

In 1979 the number of Ministers was expanded to three, and the Financial Secretary ceased to sit as part of the Executive Council. In 1999 the Cabinet was expanded to the current format of four Ministers. In 2007 the Executive Council was renamed the Cabinet, and in addition to the existing members, a Cabinet Secretary was appointed.
