= Shereen Flax-Charles =

British Virgin Islands politician

Junior Minister for Trade and Economic Development of the British Virgin Islands
- Incumbent
- Assumed office 26 November 2019
- Preceded by: Sharie de Castro

Member of the House of Assembly of the British Virgin Islands
- Incumbent
- Assumed office 25 February 2019

Personal details
- Party: Virgin Islands Party

Shereen D. Flax-Charles is a British Virgin Islands politician. She is an At-large representative for the House of Assembly of the British Virgin Islands, a position that she has held since the 2019 general election. She is the current Junior Minister for Trade and Economic Development.

== Early life ==
Flax-Charles is the daughter of Norma and Andy Flax, who own the Fischer's Cove Beach Hotel in Virgin Gorda. Her sister, Sharon P. Flax-Brutus, serves as director of tourism for the British Virgin Islands and her niece, Sasha D. A. Flax, is the Sister Island coordinator. She is a calypsonian who goes by the name Queen Shereen and signs for the band "It's a Secret". She was the first runner-up in the Calypso Monarch competition in both 2015 and 2016. She worked for nearly twenty years as Sister Islands Tourism Development Manager and Projects Manager for the BVI Tourist Board.

== Political career ==
Flax-Charles was first elected to the House of Assembly of the British Virgin Islands on 25 February 2019. She ran as one of four candidates from the Virgin Islands Party (VIP) to be an At-large representative. She campaigned on a promise to focus on youth development, affordable housing, clean energy and providing accommodations for people with special needs. She has supported the call for a new constitutional review and has pledged her commitment to the Sister Islands. She was the first female legislator from Virgin Gorda. Alongside Vincent Wheatley, she was also part of only the second set of legislators from the Sisters Islands to serve in the House of Assembly concurrently, the first set being Ralph T. O'Neal and Reeial George. She is also one of three women in the legislator, alongside Alvera Maduro-Caines and Sharie de Castro, for the first time ever.

Flax-Charles was assigned as the Junior Minister for Tourism following the election. On 26 November 2019, she was reassigned as Junior Minister for Trade and Economic Development, an appointment that was effective the previous day. As a result of the 2021 Commission of Inquiry report, Natalio Wheatley proposed a new Cabinet, comprising ministers from all three major political parties. The new Unity Government was sworn in on 5 May 2022, with Flax-Charles retaining her portfolio as Junior Minister for Trade and Economic Development.

== Personal life ==
Her husband is Lilly Walter-Charles and she has three children.
