= 2019 British Virgin Islands general election =

- 25 February 2019

All 13 elected seats in the House of Assembly 7 seats needed for a majority
- Turnout: 64.64%
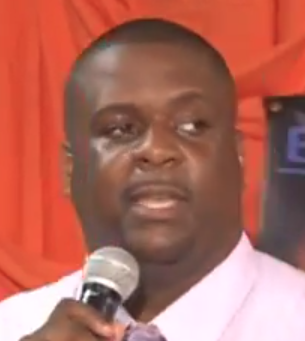

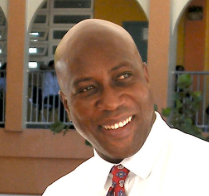

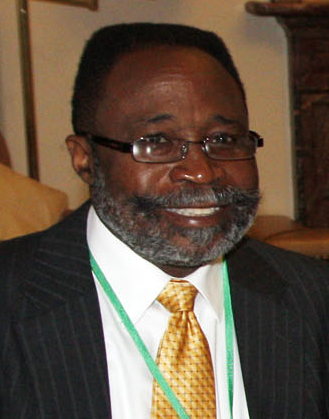

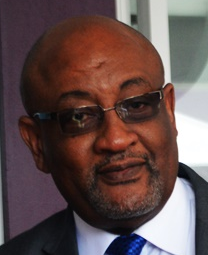
	First party	Second party
Leader	Andrew Fahie	Myron Walwyn
Party	VIP	NDP
Last election	2 seats	11 seats
Seats won	8	3
Seat change	▲6	▼8
	Third party	Fourth party
Leader	Julian Fraser	Ronnie Skelton
Party	PU	PVIM
Last election	–	–
Seats won	1	1
Seat change	New	New
Premier before election
Orlando Smith
National Democratic Party
Premier after election
Andrew Fahie
Virgin Islands Party

General elections were held in the British Virgin Islands on 25 February 2019. For the first time, four parties with at least one incumbent member were contesting an election.

The result was a decisive victory for the Virgin Islands Party, which won eight of the 13 elected seats. The ruling National Democratic Party won only three seats, with party leader Myron Walwyn losing his seat. Seven of the thirteen seats were won by candidates contesting an election for the first time, all for the Virgin Islands Party, a territorial record.

The elections were the first in the British Virgin Islands to use electronically tabulated voting rather that manual counts. Voter turnout was 64.64%.

Election monitors reported that they saw "no real evidence of corruption", but highlighted a large influx of voter registrations in Districts 5 and 8 which had been regarded in some quarters as potential attempt to manipulate results.

== Background ==
The House of Assembly normally sits in four-year terms. The Governor must dissolve the House within four years of the date when the House first meets after a general election unless it has been dissolved sooner. Once the House is dissolved a general election must be held after at least 21 days, but not more than two months after the dissolution of the House. The third session of the House of Assembly first met on 23 June 2015, and therefore in the ordinary course of things the latest possible date of the next British Virgin Islands general election would have been one day short of four years and two months after that date, i.e. on 22 August 2019.

However, Delores Christopher, member of the House of Assembly representing the 5th District died on 16 October 2018. There was broad agreement that it was undesirable to hold two elections so close together (a by-election to appoint a new representative for the 5th District, followed by a general election). Accordingly, after taking legal advice and consulting with the Premier Orlando Smith the Governor, Augustus Jaspert, advised that it had been agreed that no separate by-election should be held, and the election would be held on or before 16 April 2019.

The House of Assembly was dissolved on 23 January 2019 and an election date was immediately announced for 25 February 2019.

== Electoral system ==
The House of Assembly has a total of 15 members, 13 of whom are members elected by the public to serve a four-year term, plus two ex-officio non-voting members: the Attorney General and the Speaker of the House. Of the 13 elected members, nine are elected via first-past-the-post voting to represent territorial district seats, and four are elected on a territory-wide "at-large" basis via plurality block voting.

== New leaders and new parties ==
Both of the main political parties which had contested the prior election had leadership contests, and in both cases the person who lost the leadership contest left to form their own party. Accordingly, in the 2019 election, there were an unprecedented four different political parties with at least one sitting member contesting the general election.

=== National Democratic Party ===
In June 2018 the Premier and leader of the National Democratic Party (NDP), Orlando Smith indicated he would be stepping down and not contesting the next general election. In the subsequent leadership contest the party chose Education Minister Myron Walwyn to lead the party into the next election.

In the wake of Dr Smith's announced retirement, rumours of splits within the ruling National Democratic Party began to circulate almost immediately. Eventually Ronnie Skelton, runner up in the leadership contest, left to form his own political party, named the Progressive Virgin Islands Movement (PVIM).

Deputy Premier, Kedrick Pickering, also left the party to run as an independent.

Second District Representative Melvin "Mitch" Turnbull also left the NDP to join Skelton, as did at-large representative, Archie Christian. Certain media houses began to sarcastically refer to the PVIM as "NDP 2".

=== Virgin Islands Party ===
The Virgin Islands Party (VIP) also had a leadership contest, and the sitting leader, Julian Fraser, was ousted by the challenger, Andrew Fahie. Fraser subsequently announced he would leave the VIP and set up his own party, which he called Progressives United (PU).

=== Controversies ===
==== Myron Walwyn Eligibility Issue ====
In the run up to the election there were repeated suggestions in the press that Myron Walwyn was not eligible for election to the House of Assembly because his parents are not from the BVI. His father is from Nevis and his mother is from Antigua. Leader of the opposition Virgin Islands Party, Andrew Fahie, distanced himself from questions about Walwyn's eligibility.

==== Speaker of the House Issue ====
Some controversy arose when leaked lists of candidates suggested that the speaker of the House, Ingrid Moses-Scatliffe, was to stand as an NDP candidate. A number of public figures, the most prominent being Deputy Premier Kedrick Pickering, expressed concern at her being held out as a candidate for a political party whilst occupying the position of Speaker of the House. Ms Moses-Scatliffe refused to confirm or deny that she would be a candidate for the NDP, and the Attorney General rendered an opinion indicating that even if she were, this would not legally preclude her from acting as Speaker of the House in the interim. Ultimately she was not named as a candidate.

== Results ==
Party	District			At-large			Total seats	+/–
Party	Votes	%	Seats	Votes	%	Seats	Total seats	+/–
Virgin Islands Party	4,855	50.30	4	17,441	45.60	4	8	6
National Democratic Party	2,701	27.98	3	10,798	28.23	0	3	–8
Progressive Virgin Islands Movement	1,188	12.31	1	7,126	18.63	0	1	New
Progressives United	571	5.92	1	1,279	3.34	0	1	New
Independents	338	3.50	0	1,607	4.20	0	0	0
Speaker and Attorney General							2	0
Total	9,653	100.00	9	38,251	100.00	4	15	0
Valid votes	9,653	99.31		38,251	98.38			
Invalid/blank votes	67	0.69		629	1.62			
Total votes	9,720	100.00		38,880	100.00			
Registered voters/turnout	15,038	64.64						
Source: Election Centre

=== District seats ===
1st District
Candidate	Party	Votes	%
Andrew Fahie	Virgin Islands Party	742	81.45
Sylvia C. Romney-Moses	Progressive Virgin Islands Movement	141	15.48
Stephanie A. Brewley	Progressives United	28	3.07
Total		911	100.00
Valid votes		911	99.45
Invalid/blank votes		5	0.55
Total votes		916	100.00

Incumbent Andrew Fahie (VIP) easily won his sixth consecutive election over his two challengers each contesting their first. District 1 had the lowest turnout of any district with 60.38% of voters participating. Fahie's victory was the highest in terms of margin of votes (601) and the percentage of votes cast (81.45%).

2nd District
Candidate	Party	Votes	%
Melvin Mitchell Turnbull	Progressive Virgin Islands Movement	550	54.19
Carnel Clyne	Virgin Islands Party	465	45.81
Total		1,015	100.00
Valid votes		1,015	99.12
Invalid/blank votes		9	0.88
Total votes		1,024	100.00

Incumbent Melvin Turnbull retained his seat after switching parties to join the PVIM, defeating political newcomer Carnel Clyne (VIP).

3rd District
Candidate	Party	Votes	%
Julian Fraser	Progressives United	519	47.10
Aaron F. Parillon	National Democratic Party	294	26.68
Arlene Smith-Thompson	Virgin Islands Party	289	26.23
Total		1,102	100.00
Valid votes		1,102	99.64
Invalid/blank votes		4	0.36
Total votes		1,106	100.00

Incumbent Julian Fraser won his sixth election but his first as the leader of the PU after leaving the VIP. He has never lost an election in his 3rd district stronghold. His opponents, Aaron Parillon (NDP) and Arlene Smith-Thompson (VIP) were each contesting their first election.

4th District
Candidate	Party	Votes	%
Mark Vanterpool	National Democratic Party	442	49.72
Luce Hodge-Smith	Virgin Islands Party	385	43.31
Karl Marcus Scatliffe	Progressive Virgin Islands Movement	38	4.27
Vincent Gregory Scatliffe	Progressives United	24	2.70
Total		889	100.00
Valid votes		889	98.67
Invalid/blank votes		12	1.33
Total votes		901	100.00

Incumbent Mark Vanterpool (NDP) won his fifth election in six contests, narrowly holding off newcomer Luce Hodge-Smith. District 4 had the highest proportion of spoiled ballots of any district.

5th District
Candidate	Party	Votes	%
Kye Rymer	Virgin Islands Party	638	51.53
Wade Noel Smith	Progressive Virgin Islands Movement	396	31.99
Elvis Jerome Harrigan	National Democratic Party	204	16.48
Total		1,238	100.00
Valid votes		1,238	98.96
Invalid/blank votes		13	1.04
Total votes		1,251	100.00

Incumbent Delores Christopher died prior to the election leaving the seat vacant. Newcomer Kye Rymer (VIP) overcame fellow newcomer Wade Smith (PVIM) and political veteran Elvis "Juggy" Harrigan (NDP), who was contesting his fifth election (including once as an at-large candidate).

6th District
Candidate	Party	Votes	%
Alvera Maduro-Caines	National Democratic Party	575	51.85
John M. Samue	Virgin Islands Party	534	48.15
Total		1,109	100.00
Valid votes		1,109	99.11
Invalid/blank votes		10	0.89
Total votes		1,119	100.00

Incumbent Alvera Maduro-Caines (NDP) won her third consecutive election narrowly defeating newcomer John Samuel (VIP). Less than a year after the election Maduro-Caines would "cross the floor" to join the VIP.

7th District
Candidate	Party	Votes	%
Natalio Wheatley	Virgin Islands Party	384	44.76
Kedrick Pickering	Independent	338	39.39
Hipolito Diego Penn	National Democratic Party	136	15.85
Total		858	100.00
Valid votes		858	99.08
Invalid/blank votes		8	0.92
Total votes		866	100.00

Incumbent Kedrick Pickering running as an independent in his fifth election, having won his previous four contests, lost to Natalio Wheatley who was contesting his third-ever general election for a third different party. The same seat was formerly held by Wheatley's grandfather, former Chief Minister, Willard Wheatley.

8th District
Candidate	Party	Votes	%
Marlon A. Penn	National Democratic Party	726	57.94
Dean B. Fahie	Virgin Islands Party	527	42.06
Total		1,253	100.00
Valid votes		1,253	99.68
Invalid/blank votes		4	0.32
Total votes		1,257	100.00

Marlon Penn (NDP) won his third consecutive contest, comfortably defeating Dean Fahie (VIP) who was standing for election for the first time.

9th District
Candidate	Party	Votes	%
Vincent Wheatley	Virgin Islands Party	891	69.72
Hubert O'Neal	National Democratic Party	324	25.35
Jose de Castro	Progressive Virgin Islands Movement	63	4.93
Total		1,278	100.00
Valid votes		1,278	99.84
Invalid/blank votes		2	0.16
Total votes		1,280	100.00

Political newcomer Vincent Wheatley (VIP) easily defeated incumbent Hubert O'Neal (NDP) who was contesting his seventh general election (having won only once previously, in 2015). District 9 had the highest turnout of any district with 71.03% of voters participating. Wheatley's 891 votes were the highest total of any district candidate.

=== At-large seats ===
Candidate	Party	Votes	%
Sharie De Castro	Virgin Islands Party	4,778	12.49
Neville Smith	Virgin Islands Party	4,694	12.27
Shereen Flax-Charles	Virgin Islands Party	4,033	10.54
Carvin Malone	Virgin Islands Party	3,936	10.29
Myron Walwyn	National Democratic Party	3,335	8.72
Henry Osmond Creque	National Democratic Party	2,799	7.32
Ronnie W. Skelton	Progressive Virgin Islands Movement	2,639	6.90
Sandy Michelle Harrigan-Underhil	National Democratic Party	2,418	6.32
Trefor Arvid Grant	National Democratic Party	2,246	5.87
Shaina Mary Ann Smith	Progressive Virgin Islands Movement	1,805	4.72
Curnal Pedrito Fahie	Progressive Virgin Islands Movement	1,619	4.23
Dancia Penn	Independent	1,607	4.20
Lesmore Smith	Progressive Virgin Islands Movement	1,063	2.78
Dirk Laurence Walters	Progressives United	769	2.01
Verna Veronica Smith	Progressives United	278	0.73
Rajah Smith	Progressives United	232	0.61
Total		38,251	100.00
Valid votes		38,251	98.38
Invalid/blank votes		629	1.62
Total votes		38,880	100.00

The VIP candidates won all four of the at-large seats. Each of them other than Sharie DeCastro (contesting her second election, after being unsuccessful in 2015), were standing for election for the first time.

Incumbents Myron Walwyn and Ronnie Skelton were not returned (the two other previous incumbents, Orlando Smith and Archie Christian, did not run).

== Pre-election polling ==
Although no formal or scientific polls were conducted in the Territory, an unofficial online poll was conducted by VI Platinum News which suggested that a majority of voters prefer the Virgin Islands Party, and a plurality of voters prefer Andrew Fahie as leader. However the highly fragmented outcome of the polling (which does not include independents) pointed to the possibility of a coalition government.

Party	Votes	%age	Leader	Votes	%age
VIP	1,518	51.7%	Andrew Fahie	1,485	47.8%
NDP	831	28.3%	Myron Walwyn	896	28.8%
PVIM	485	16.5%	Ronnie Skelton	557	17.9%
PU	101	3.5%	Julian Fraser	169	5.4%
Total:	2,935	100.0%	Total:	3,107	100.0%

Although unscientific, previous polls have correctly predicted the outcome of past elections. In this election the final results were also relatively similar to the informal advance polls, each party polling within 2.5% (the normal margin of error on a scientific poll) of the predicted result.

== Manifestos ==
Myriad political promises were made and publicised by each party. Manifestos for each political party were launched before the election date of 25 February 2019 as follows:

- The National Democratic Party (NDP) launched their election manifesto Manifesto 2019: Better, Stronger Together on Friday 15 February 2019.
- The Virgin Islands Party (VIP) launched their election manifesto Restoring Hope & Prosperity for All: Virgin Islands Party Manifesto 2019 on Tuesday 19 February 2019.
- The Progressive Virgin Islands Movement (PVIM) launched their Business Plan of the People of the Virgin Islands by Friday 18 January 2019.
- Progressives United (PU) launched Our Vision.
- NDP. Promised to increase scholarships for Virgin Islands to include postgraduate studies, and to make $10 million available to support local businesses.
- PVIM. Promised to cut tax by increasing the tax free allowance on payroll taxes from $10,000 to $15,000 and promised to introduce a bonus scheme for public sector employees. They also suggested legalising gambling.
- PU. Promised free legal services, elderly healthcare and free school lunches, as well as pledging to give $1,000,000 a year to research into chronic diseases. Also pledged to introduce "American black history" into school curriculum.
- VIP. Promised to introduce 'district councils', reduce the need for imported labour and introduce whistleblower laws. They also advocated laws mandating the purchase of local foods before importing food from overseas, and providing subsidies for farmers.

== Government ==
As the leader of the party with a majority, Andrew Fahie was appointed Premier and invited to form a government.

In appointing his Cabinet, Fahie reshuffled various ministerial portfolios from the traditional division of responsibilities. Unusually, every member of Cabinet except for Fahie himself is a political newcomer entering the House of Assembly for the first time.

Cabinet of the British Virgin Islands
Office	Members	Notes
Premier	Andrew Fahie	Minister of Finance
Governor	Augustus Jaspert	
Ministers	Carvin Malone	Ministry of Telecommunications, Health & Welfare
Ministers	Natalio Wheatley	Ministry of Education, Culture, Agriculture, Fisheries, Sports & Youth Affairs
Ministers	Kye Rymer	Minister of Transportation, Works & Utilities
Ministers	Vincent Wheatley	Ministry of Natural Resources, Labour & Immigration
Attorney General	Baba Aziz	Ex-officio, non-voting
Cabinet Secretary	Sandra Ward	

In addition, Shereen Flax-Charles was appointed a junior minister for tourism.

== Subsequent events ==
Following the shock defeat of Myron Walwyn, Marlon Penn was appointed Leader of the Opposition. After initially prevaricating, Walwyn confirmed that he would not be quitting politics.

As is customary, the opposition pledged to work with the new government.

Eight days after the election, the successful District 4 candidate and former Cabinet Minister, Mark Vanterpool shocked the country by announcing he was resigning from politics and stepping down from his seat. He subsequently withdrew his resignation and alleged it was invalid as it was sent to the Cabinet Secretary and not the Speaker of the House as required by the Constitution. The Speaker has insisted that the seat is vacant, but in subsequent legal proceedings the court eventually ruled in favour of Mr Vanterpool.
