= Progressive Virgin Islands Movement =

- Leader: Ronnie Skelton
- Founded: 2018
- Split from: National Democratic Party
- Ideology: Progressivism; British Virgin Islands independence
- House of Assembly: 3 / 13

The Progressive Virgin Islands Movement (PVIM) is a political party in the British Virgin Islands. It is presently led by Ronnie Skelton.

Although the party uses the word 'progressive' in its name, this is generally taken as a reflection of a desire for 'progress' in terms of the Territory's development rather than an ideological attachment to traditional socially progressive politics. The party's leader supports the independence of the British Virgin Islands.

== Founding ==
The party was founded in 2018 following an acrimonious split in the ruling National Democratic Party. The then-Premier, Orlando Smith, indicated that he would retire from politics at the next election. This created a leadership contest, and the two main candidates were Myron Walwyn and Ronnie Skelton. Walwyn won, and thereafter Skelton resigned to form his own party.

== Electoral history ==
The party contested the 2019 British Virgin Islands general election, but only won a single seat ("Mitch" Turnbull in District 2). Although Skelton failed to win election to the House, he remained leader of the party, although Turbull represented it in the House.

Ahead of the 2023 British Virgin Islands general election the party doubled the number of representatives it had in the house when Junior Minister Shereen Flax-Charles "crossed the floor" to join the PVIM. Ms Flax-Charles was unsuccessful in her re-election bid, but three PVIM candidates were elected, including incumbent Mitch Turnbull and party leader Ronnie Skelton.

=== House of Assembly elections ===
Election	Leader	Votes	%	Seats	+/–	Position	Status
2019	Ronnie Skelton	1,188	12.31%	1 / 13	▲1	▲3rd	Opposition
2023	Ronnie Skelton	1,546	16.86%	3 / 13	▲2	▲2nd	Opposition
