= Lorna Smith =

British Virgin Islands politician

Lorna Smith MHA

Member of the House of Assembly of the British Virgin Islands
- Incumbent
- Assumed office 24 April 2023

Deputy Premier of the British Virgin Islands
- In office 2023–2024

Personal details
- Party: Virgin Islands Party (since 2023)
- Other political affiliations: National Democratic Party (until 2023)
- Spouse: Orlando Smith

Lorna G. Smith OBE is a British Virgin Islands politician.

== Biography ==
Smith is the wife of former premier Orlando Smith. Lorna Smith was elected in the 2023 British Virgin Islands general election for an at-large seat. She was elected for the National Democratic Party (NDP). After the election she switched from a lifetime supporting the NDP to join the Virgin Islands Party (VIP).

Smith was appointed Deputy Premier and Minister for Financial Services, Labour and Trade by Natalio Wheatley. She was dismissed in October 2024. In March 2025, she left the opposition and re-joined the government.

Smith was awarded the Order of the British Empire (OBE) by Elizabeth II.
