= 2011 British Virgin Islands general election =

← 2007	7 November 2011	2015 →

13 of the 15 seats in the House of Assembly 7 seats needed for a majority
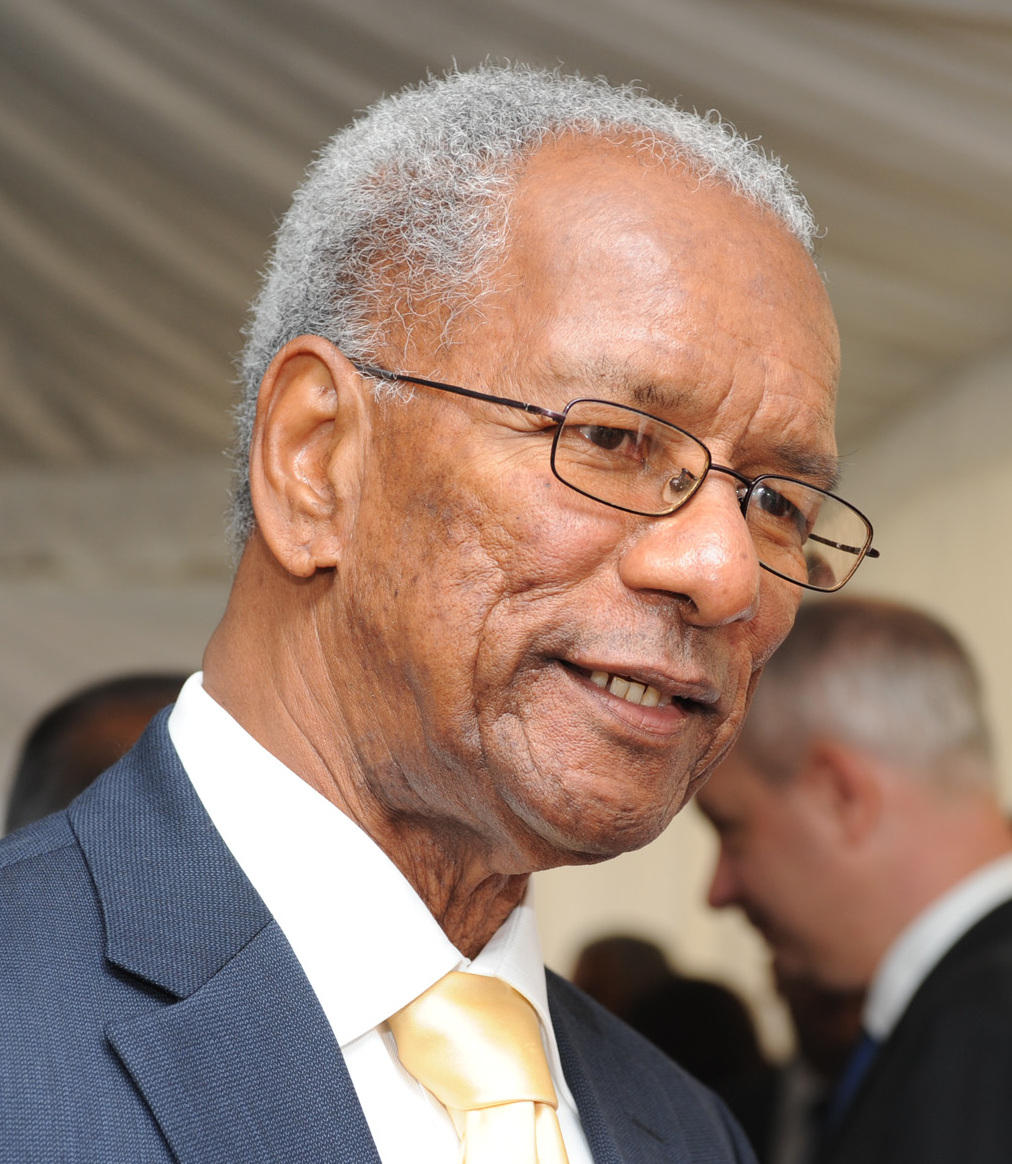

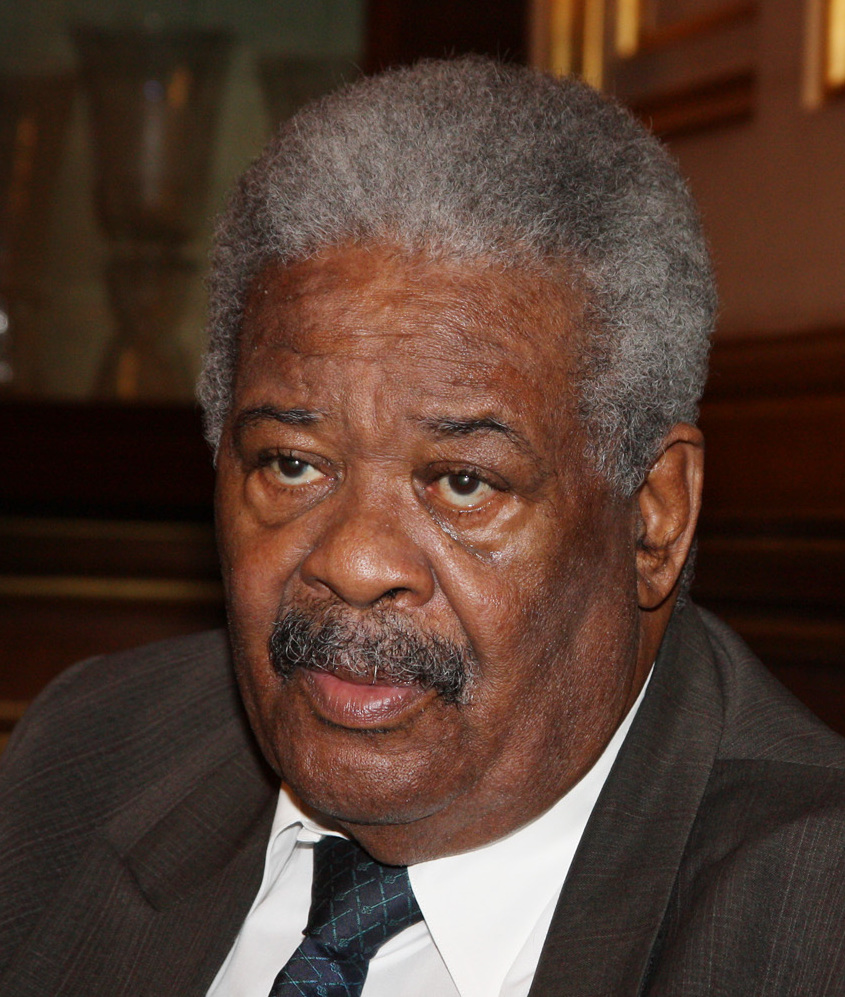
	First party	Second party
Leader	Orlando Smith	Ralph T. O'Neal
Party	NDP	VIP
Last election	46.74%, 2 seats	50.31%, 10 seats
Seats won	9	4
Seat change	▲7	▼6
Percentage	52.91%	38.34%
Premier before election
Ralph T. O'Neal
VIP
Premier after election
Orlando Smith
NDP

General elections were held in the British Virgin Islands on 7 November 2011. The result was a decisive victory for the opposition National Democratic Party (NDP) led by Orlando Smith over the incumbent Virgin Islands Party (VIP), led by Premier Ralph T. O'Neal. No minor parties or independent candidates won any seats.

== Background ==
The House of Assembly was dissolved on 13 September 2011, by the Governor, Mr William Boyd McCleary, on advice from the Premier. However, the date of the election was not announced until 23 September 2011.

Premier Ralph O'Neal confirmed that he would lead his party at the 2011 general election, even though he would turn 78 shortly after the election, and would be 82 at the end of the term of office (if re-elected).

Second district representative, Alvin Christopher (who received the highest percentage of votes for a territorial candidate (75.9%) in the 2007 election) announced that he would run for the Virgin Islands Party. Mr Christopher has formerly run for the VIP, the NDP and as an independent candidate.

Although the ruling Virgin Islands Party had a huge majority following the 2007 election the intervening years had been characterised by difficult economic times, and a series of natural disasters had hit the Territory damaging its infrastructure. Both of these events led to criticism being directed towards the ruling Government.

== Results ==
The 2011 general election was largely a complete reversal of the 2007 election. Whereas in 2007 everything seemed to go the way of the VIP, in 2011 every closely contested seat seemed to end up falling to the NDP. The VIP characteristically dominated their safe seats in the First, Second and Third Districts, and the NDP characteristically dominated the At-large seats, sweeping all four. But surprise defeats for the VIP in Fifth, Sixth and Eighth Districts handed victory to the NDP. Former Premier Ralph O'Neal managed to cling on to his seat in the Ninth District, which he had held for 40 years, by just 28 votes.

Party	District			At-large			Total seats	+/–
Party	Votes	%	Seats	Votes	%	Seats	Total seats	+/–
National Democratic Party	4,271	48.18	5	18,447	52.91	4	9	+7
Virgin Islands Party	3,864	43.59	4	13,367	38.34	0	4	–6
People's Patriotic Alliance				2,266	6.50	0	0	New
Party of the People	72	0.81	0				0	New
Independents	657	7.41	0	782	2.24	0	0	–1
Speaker and Attorney General							2	0
Total	8,864	100.00	9	34,862	100.00	4	15	0
Valid votes	8,864	99.23		8,843	99.05			
Invalid/blank votes	69	0.77		85	0.95			
Total votes	8,933	100.00		8,928	100.00			
Registered voters/turnout	12,609	70.85		12,609	70.81			
Source: Election Centre

=== District seats ===
One of the bigger surprises was the defeat of Government minister and veteran politician, Omar Hodge, in the 6th district by political newcomer, Alvera Maduro-Caines. Early counts showed incumbent Premier, Ralph O'Neal, trailing his challenger, Hubert O'Neal, in the 9th district, but he eventually overhauled the challenger to retain the seat which he has held since 1975.

In the Territorial seats, the highest percentage of votes and greatest margin of victory (nearly 50 points) was Kedrick Pickering in the 7th district. The largest number of individual votes however was Delores Christopher in the 5th district. The lowest percentage of votes by a winning candidate was Marlon Penn (48.1%) in the four way race in the 9th district. The lowest total number of votes by a victorious candidate was Alvin Christopher (423) in the 2nd district.

1st District
Candidate	Party	Votes	%
Andrew Fahie	Virgin Islands Party	611	65.84
Preston Stoutt	Independent	317	34.16
Total		928	100.00
Valid votes		928	99.36
Invalid/blank votes		6	0.64
Total votes		934	100.00
Registered voters/turnout		1,384	67.49

2nd District
Candidate	Party	Votes	%
Alvin Christopher	Virgin Islands Party	423	52.42
Claude Skelton-Cline	National Democratic Party	324	40.15
Leall Rymer	Independent	53	6.57
Allewine Smith	Independent	7	0.87
Total		807	100.00
Valid votes		807	98.66
Invalid/blank votes		11	1.34
Total votes		818	100.00
Registered voters/turnout		1,248	65.54

3rd District
Candidate	Party	Votes	%
Julian Fraser	Virgin Islands Party	613	52.39
Kevin Smith	National Democratic Party	557	47.61
Total		1,170	100.00
Valid votes		1,170	99.49
Invalid/blank votes		6	0.51
Total votes		1,176	100.00
Registered voters/turnout		1,530	76.86

4th District
Candidate	Party	Votes	%
Mark Vanterpool	National Democratic Party	661	68.50
Vincent Scatliffe	Virgin Islands Party	209	21.66
Collin Scatliffe	Independent	95	9.84
Total		965	100.00
Valid votes		965	99.18
Invalid/blank votes		8	0.82
Total votes		973	100.00
Registered voters/turnout		1,346	72.29

5th District
Candidate	Party	Votes	%
Delores Christopher	National Democratic Party	520	52.10
Elvis Harrigan	Virgin Islands Party	478	47.90
Total		998	100.00
Valid votes		998	99.20
Invalid/blank votes		8	0.80
Total votes		1,006	100.00
Registered voters/turnout		1,521	66.14

6th District
Candidate	Party	Votes	%
Alvera Maduro-Caines	National Democratic Party	612	61.38
Omar Hodge	Virgin Islands Party	385	38.62
Total		997	100.00
Valid votes		997	99.11
Invalid/blank votes		9	0.89
Total votes		1,006	100.00
Registered voters/turnout		1,520	66.18

7th District
Candidate	Party	Votes	%
Kedrick Pickering	National Democratic Party	536	70.07
Ronnie Lettsome	Virgin Islands Party	157	20.52
Allen Wheatley	Party of the People	72	9.41
Total		765	100.00
Valid votes		765	98.84
Invalid/blank votes		9	1.16
Total votes		774	100.00
Registered voters/turnout		1,158	66.84

8th District
Candidate	Party	Votes	%
Marlon Penn	National Democratic Party	524	48.12
Dancia Penn	Virgin Islands Party	423	38.84
Bevis Sylvester	Independent	112	10.28
Nolan Davis	Independent	30	2.75
Total		1,089	100.00
Valid votes		1,089	99.27
Invalid/blank votes		8	0.73
Total votes		1,097	100.00
Registered voters/turnout		1,404	78.13

9th District
Candidate	Party	Votes	%
Ralph T. O'Neal	Virgin Islands Party	565	49.34
Hubert O'Neal	National Democratic Party	537	46.90
Lorie Rymer	Independent	20	1.75
Rheudel Samuel O'Neal	Independent	12	1.05
Devon Osborne	Independent	11	0.96
Total		1,145	100.00
Valid votes		1,145	99.65
Invalid/blank votes		4	0.35
Total votes		1,149	100.00
Registered voters/turnout		1,498	76.70

=== Territorial At-Large Seats ===
The results for the at-large seats were as following. The top four vote receiving candidates are elected to the at-large seats.

Candidate	Party	Votes	%
Orlando Smith	National Democratic Party	5,117	14.68
Myron Walwyn	National Democratic Party	4,619	13.25
Ronnie W. Skelton	National Democratic Party	4,489	12.88
Archibald Christian	National Democratic Party	4,222	12.11
Irene Penn-O'Neal	Virgin Islands Party	3,870	11.10
Zoë Walcott-McMillan	Virgin Islands Party	3,417	9.80
Vernon Elroy Malone	Virgin Islands Party	3,041	8.72
Keith L. Flax	Virgin Islands Party	3,039	8.72
Shaina Smith	People's Patriotic Alliance	906	2.60
Natalio Wheatley	People's Patriotic Alliance	798	2.29
Bertrand Lettsome	Independent	478	1.37
Elton Callwood	People's Patriotic Alliance	354	1.02
Khoy Smith	People's Patriotic Alliance	208	0.60
Edmund Gregory Maduro	Independent	123	0.35
Lionel Penn	Independent	100	0.29
Eileene Baronville	Independent	81	0.23
Total		34,862	100.00
Valid votes		8,843	99.05
Invalid/blank votes		85	0.95
Total votes		8,928	100.00
Registered voters/turnout		12,609	70.81

Orlando Smith, being the leader of the victorious National Democratic Party, was invited by the Governor to form a new Government as the Premier.

== Aftermath ==
On 9 November 2011 Governor Boyd McCleary officially appointed Orlando Smith as the Premier under section 52(1) the constitution. He became the third person in BVI political history to serve two non-consecutive terms of office as Chief Minister/Premier, and the fourth to win more than one general election as party leader

On the same day the first cabinet was sworn in under Orlando Smith. In addition to serving as Premier, Smith was appointed Minister of Finance and Tourism. Kedrick Pickering was appointed Deputy Premier and Minister of Natural Resources and Labour, Myron Walwyn was appointed Minister of Education and Culture, Mark Vanterpool was appointed Minister of Communications and Works and Ronnie Skelton was appointed Minister of Health and Social Development.

== Sources ==
- Virgin Islands News Online - 2011 General Election
- Platinum News BVI - 2011 General Election
