= 1975 British Virgin Islands general election =

General election held in the British Virgin Islands

- 1 September 1975

All seats in the British Virgin Islands Legislative Council 4 seats needed for a majority
- Turnout: 74.6%
	First party	Second party
Leader	Lavity Stoutt	Willard Wheatley
Party	VIP	United Party
Leader since	1971	1975
Leader's seat	1st District	6th District
Seats before	2	1
Seats won	3	2
Seat change	▲1	▲1
Chief Minister before election
Willard Wheatley
VI Democratic Party
(Coalition)
Elected Chief Minister
Willard Wheatley
United Party
(Coalition)

General elections were held in the British Virgin Islands on 1 September 1975. The result was one of the most confused in the Territory's history, but is officially recorded as a victory for the United Party led by Willard Wheatley over the opposition Virgin Islands Party (VIP) led by former Chief Minister Lavity Stoutt.

In reality the election provided no clear consensus, and when the election was over, successful candidates dropped their prior allegiances and tried to broker deals that would enable them to secure power. At the end of this process Willard Wheatley retained his role as Chief Minister and led a coalition loosely affiliated to the United Party. But as has been recorded: "The 1975 General Elections did not produce a clear majority for any party and the loyalties, which appeared to have existed prior to and in the course of the election campaign, fell apart in the aftermath. Mr. W.W. Wheatly again emerged as Chief Minister, but with a different team."

== Background ==
The 1975 general election was something of a dangerous crossroad for British Virgin Islands politics. The first party political election in 1967 had been won by the United Party. However, internal struggles relating to who should be leader led to the party fragmenting before the next election. That allowed the opposition VI Democratic Party to win the 1971 election, but exactly the same thing happened to them: disagreements between party leader Q.W. Osborne and Chief Minister Willard Wheatley led Wheatley to remove Osborne from his Ministerial seat. The resulting discord meant that, despite technically being the party in power, the VI Democratic Party did not actually promote any candidates at all for the 1975 election - Wheatley left to form an alliance with the United Party, and Osborne left to join the Virgin Islands Party.

== Results ==
Willard Wheatley won the election in a coalition with the United Party. Although the United Party only won two seats, fewer than the Virgin Islands Party (which won three), Wheatley was able to assemble a coalition and remain Chief Minister and at the head of government.

Austin Henley was a former member of the VI Democratic Party, but ran as a United Party candidate. However, after the election he was named Leader of the Opposition. Henley later died in office, and Oliver Cills continued as Leader of the Opposition. Both Henley and Cills were recorded as members of the VI Democratic Party whilst Leaders of the Opposition.

Candidates elected for the first time included future Chief Minister and Premier, Ralph T. O'Neal.

Party	Votes	%	Seats	+/–
Virgin Islands Party	1,591	53.82	3	+1
United Party	797	26.96	2	+1
VI Progressive Party	89	3.01	0	New
Oliver Cills	0	0.00	1	–
Independents	479	16.20	1	0
Total	2,956	100.00	7	0
Valid votes	2,956	98.66		
Invalid/blank votes	40	1.34		
Total votes	2,996	100.00		
Registered voters/turnout	4,018	74.56		
Source: BVI Deputy Governor's Office

=== By constituency ===
Oliver Cills was elected unopposed in the 3rd District.

1st District
Candidate	Party	Votes	%
Hamilton Lavity Stoutt	Virgin Islands Party	334	75.06
Cyril Romney	Independent	111	24.94
Total		445	100.00
Valid votes		445	99.55
Invalid/blank votes		2	0.45
Total votes		447	100.00
Registered voters/turnout		564	79.26

2nd District
Candidate	Party	Votes	%
Austin Henley	United Party	191	50.13
Stanford Connor	Virgin Islands Party	190	49.87
Total		381	100.00
Valid votes		381	97.69
Invalid/blank votes		9	2.31
Total votes		390	100.00
Registered voters/turnout		568	68.66

4th District
Candidate	Party	Votes	%
Alban Anthony	Virgin Islands Party	288	60.25
Noel Lloyd	Virgin Islands Progressive Party	89	18.62
Isaac Glanville Fonseca	Independent	60	12.55
Walter Lindy DeCastro	United Party	41	8.58
Total		478	100.00
Valid votes		478	98.56
Invalid/blank votes		7	1.44
Total votes		485	100.00
Registered voters/turnout		714	67.93

5th District
Candidate	Party	Votes	%
Qwominer William Osborne	Virgin Islands Party	323	56.77
Conrad Maduro	United Party	246	43.23
Total		569	100.00
Valid votes		569	98.27
Invalid/blank votes		10	1.73
Total votes		579	100.00
Registered voters/turnout		779	74.33

6th District
Candidate	Party	Votes	%
Willard Wheatley	United Party	319	52.73
Terrance B. Lettsome	Virgin Islands Party	286	47.27
Total		605	100.00
Valid votes		605	98.69
Invalid/blank votes		8	1.31
Total votes		613	100.00
Registered voters/turnout		839	73.06

7th District
Candidate	Party	Votes	%
Ralph T. O'Neal	Independent	306	64.02
Reeial George	Virgin Islands Party	170	35.56
Reuben Wheatley	Independent	2	0.42
Total		478	100.00
Valid votes		478	99.17
Invalid/blank votes		4	0.83
Total votes		482	100.00
Registered voters/turnout		554	87.00
