= Vincent Wheatley =

British Virgin Islands politician

Vincent Wheatley MHA

Member of the House of Assembly of the British Virgin Islands
- Incumbent
- Assumed office 25 February 2019

Minister for Health and Welfare
- Incumbent
- Assumed office 2023

Minister for Natural Resources, Labour and Immigration
- In office 1 March 2019 – 5 May 2022
- Succeeded by: Melvin Turnbull

Personal details
- Party: Virgin Islands Party
- Website: www.vincentwheatley.com

Vincent O. Wheatley is a British Virgin Islands politician.

== Biography ==
Wheatley is from one of the main political families in the British Virgin Islands. In 2017, as the Sister Islands Programme Coordinator in the Deputy Governor’s Office, dealt with the response to Hurricane Irma. Vincent Wheatley was elected in 2019 and 2023 for the ninth district. Wheatley was appointed Minister for Health and Welfare by Natalio Wheatley.
