= Karl Dawson =

British Virgin Islands politician

Karl Dawson MHA

Member of the House of Assembly of the British Virgin Islands
- Incumbent
- Assumed office 24 April 2023

Junior Minister for Agriculture and Fisheries
- In office 25 April 2023 – 11 March 2025

Personal details
- Party: Virgin Islands Party
- Education: University of Florida

Karl Dawson is a British Virgin Islands politician.

== Biography ==
Karl Dawson is a graduate of the University of Florida with a doctorate in higher education administration. In 2021, he was appointed consultant at the Ministry of Education, Culture, Youth Affairs, Fisheries and Agriculture. Karl Dawson was elected in the 2023 British Virgin Islands general election for the first district. Dawson was appointed Junior Minister for Agriculture and Fisheries by Natalio Wheatley. On 11 March 2025, he left the government and became deputy speaker.
