= Alvera Maduro-Caines =

British Virgin Islands politician

Ex Member of the House of Assembly of the British Virgin Islands for the Sixth District
- Incumbent
- Assumed office 9 November 2011
- Preceded by: Omar Hodge

Personal details
- Born: June 5, 1960 (age 65)
- Party: National Democratic Party (2011–2020); Virgin Islands Party (2020–present)

Alvera Maduro-Caines is a British Virgin Islands politician. She is a ex member of the House of Assembly of the British Virgin Islands for the Sixth District, a position that she has held since the 2011 general election. She was originally elected as a representative of the National Democratic Party but in 2020, she crossed the floor to join the Virgin Islands Party. She is the current Junior Minister for Culture and Tourism.

== Early life ==
She attended BVI High School in Tortola from 1971 to 1976, and the Gary Training Center in Texas from 1977 to 1979. She began her career in 1979 as a registry clerk for the Government of the British Virgin Islands before joining Devcon International as an accounts clerk in 1980. She was an officer manager and human resources officer for the British Virgin Islands Philatelic Bureau for a year, before joining Citco B.V.I. Limited as a system operator, legal secretary, office manager and supervisor of operations. From 2004 to 2011, she was assistant post mistress for the Government of the British Virgin Islands.

== Political career ==
Maduro-Caines was first elected to the House of Assembly of the British Virgin Islands in the 2011 general election. She ran on a promise to establish a trade school for young people in the district and improving the physical infrastructure. Her opponent, Omar Hodge, referred to her as "the lady with the bag". She was a representative for the Sixth District and served primarily as a backbencher for the National Democratic Party (NDP), although she briefly held the position of Junior Minister of Trade, Investment Promotion and Consumer Affairs. The NDP lost in the 2019 general election, allowing the Virgin Islands Party (VIP) to take the majority, although Maduro-Caines retained her seat.

On 20 January 2020, Maduro-Caines "crossed the floor" to join Premier Andrew Fahie as a member of the VIP. This increased the party's majority to nine and its number of female members to three. During the debate on constitutional review on 27 June 2020, she advocated for the constitution to define marriage to prevent the legalisation of same-sex marriage. She served as the acting Minister for Education, Culture, Youth Affairs, Fisheries and Agriculture from 27 February 2022 to 4 March 2022 while Natalio Wheatley was attending a CARICOM summit. On 5 May 2022, as part of the swearing in of the new Unity Government, Maduro-Caines was appointed as the Junior Minister for Tourism. Her portfolio was expanded on 27 October 2022 to include culture and Maduro-Caines became the Junior Minister of Culture and Tourism.

== Personal life ==
She is married to Emmett Caines until his death in 2022 and they have two children.
