= Peebles Hospital =

- Peebles Hospital. The new building is the main building shown. The original building is visible in the foreground below.

Geography
- Location: Road Town, Tortola, British Virgin Islands
- Coordinates: 18.4171°N 64.6191°W

Organisation
- Type: District General

Services
- Beds: 120

History
- Opened: 1922

Peebles Hospital is the main public hospital in the British Virgin Islands. The hospital is located in the capital, Road Town, on the island of Tortola. It was founded in 1922 by Major H.W. Peebles, and was originally known as the Cottage Hospital.

The main hospital building six stories plus a mechanical penthouse, with 168,700 square feet of floor space. It has facilities for patient care, surgery, and recovery, and an intensive care unit.

== Name ==
In the 1950s the hospital was renamed after Major Peebles. During the early 1990s it was briefly renamed the H.R. Penn Hospital (after H.R. Penn) before reverting to its current name. In 2015 it was again suggested that it be renamed after Orlando Smith, but that suggestion was unpopular, and has not been acted upon.

== Redevelopment ==
After surviving in its original building for nearly 90 years, the Government embarked upon an ambitious attempt to build a new hospital complex immediately behind the existing hospital. The new hospital was originally budgeted at approximately US$10 million, and expected to take just under 2 years to construct. In the event, the hospital cost well over US$100 million to construct, and took over a decade. It also costs a further US$16 million to furnish to become operational. The Government was forced to appeal to private donors to help pay some of the cost of furnishing the new hospital.

After numerous false starts, the hospital finally opened on 29 December 2014. Deputy Premier Kendrick Pickering described the new hospital as "a dream come true".

The cost overruns were caused by a combination of bad project management, disputes with construction crews, and ever-changing lists of specifications. Although historically the British Virgin Islands has normally produced a Government budget surplus, but shortly after commencing the new Peebles Hospital projectthe Territory began to run at a deficit (this time period also coincided with the 2008 financial crisis). In 2011 the Territory had its largest ever budget deficit, of US$29 million (approximately 2.6% of GDP), and by 2012 public debt had quadrupled from pre-2007 levels to approximately US$113 million (approximately 10.3% of GDP). Nearly 84% of that public debt was attributable to the new public hospital project. The Economist argued that deteriorating economic conditions in the British Virgin Islands were caused "not [by] sagging revenues but public-sector profligacy", an oblique reference to the disastrous financial mismanagement of the hospital project.
