= Ralph T. O'Neal =

British Virgin Islands politician (1933–2019)

The Honourable Ralph T. O'Neal OBE
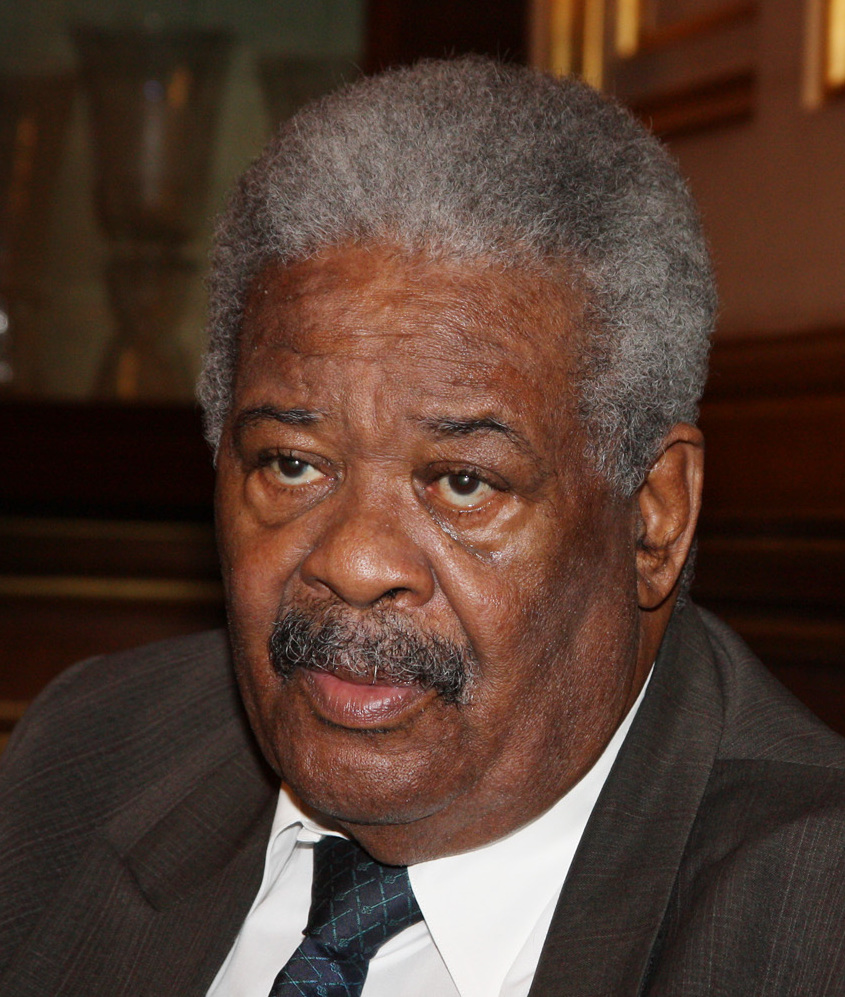
- O'Neal being appointed Premier by Governor David Pearey.

Premier of the British Virgin Islands
- In office 23 August 2007 – 9 November 2011
- Monarch: Elizabeth II
- Governor: David Pearey; Inez Archibald (Acting); William Boyd McCleary
- Preceded by: Orlando Smith (Chief Minister)
- Succeeded by: Orlando Smith

Chief Minister of the British Virgin Islands
- In office 15 May 1995 – 17 June 2003
- Monarch: Elizabeth II
- Governor: Peter Alfred Penfold; David Mackilligin; Frank Savage; Elton Georges (Acting); Tom Macan
- Preceded by: Hamilton Lavity Stoutt
- Succeeded by: Orlando Smith

Personal details
- Born: Ralph Telford O'Neal; 15 December 1933 Virgin Gorda, British Virgin Islands
- Died: 11 November 2019 (aged 85) Tortola, British Virgin Islands
- Party: Virgin Islands Party
- Spouse: Reverend Edris O'Neal
- Education: University of Oxford

Ralph Telford O'Neal, OBE (15 December 1933 – 11 November 2019) was a British Virgin Islander politician. He was the longest ever serving elected representative in the British Virgin Islands, and served as Chief Minister (when the office was so titled) or Premier of the British Virgin Islands for three terms.

== Politics ==
Ralph O'Neal was first elected to represent the district for Virgin Gorda and Anegada on 1 September 1975, and he held that seat continuously until the 2015 general election. He is the longest serving elected politician in British Virgin Islands history having served in the House of Assembly and Legislative Council for 39 years, 280 days, and his 10 election victories (including one uncontested) are second only to Lavity Stoutt in the Territory's political history. Ralph O'Neal indicated in 2014 that he would stand down at the 2015 general election.

Ralph O'Neal was first appointed Chief Minister when Lavity Stoutt died in office on 14 May 1995. He then served as Chief Minister until the 1999 general election, which he won. His party would later lose the 2003 general election, but he would return to power as Premier (as the office was renamed) for the third and final time following a landslide victory in the 2007 general election. He remained in office until 7 November 2011, after the Virgin Islands Party lost its majority following the 2011 general election. His combined 12 years as head of the elected Government is the second longest in the British Virgin Islands, behind only Lavity Stoutt.

Ralph O'Neal also served as Leader of the Opposition in the British Virgin Islands on three occasions – more than any other politician. He first served as opposition leader for the United Party from 1986 to 1988. He then served in the role for the Virgin Islands party from 2003 to 2007, and then finally from 2011 to 2015.

For most of his political career Ralph O'Neal was a member of the Virgin Islands Party, and he led the party from the time of Lavity Stoutt's death, until he stepped down as party leader and was replaced by Julian Fraser. However, like most BVI politicians, Ralph O'Neal has "crossed the floor". He contested his first election, the 1971 general election, unsuccessfully on behalf of the VI Democratic Party. He then ran for office twice as an independent candidate before joining the Virgin Islands Party. Then, in 1983, he left to join the ruling United Party, and contested the 1986 general election on behalf of the United Party. He later rejoined the Virgin Islands Party in 1988 to take up a Ministerial position in Lavity Stoutt's government and was a member of the Virgin Islands party ever since.

== Personal ==
Ralph O'Neal was educated at University of Oxford where he studied economics. He was also property owner and developer in the British Virgin Islands. Apart from his property investments, O'Neal had a number of other commercial interests during his life before serving in the House of Assembly under the Ralph O'Neal Group of Companies.

In October 2016 O'Neal was flown overseas for emergency medical treatment after reportedly suffering a stroke.

O'Neal died at his home in the McNamara area of Tortola on 11 November 2019.

== Electoral history ==
Ralph T. O'Neal electoral history
Year	District	Party	Votes	Percentage	Winning/losing margin	Result
1971	7th District	VI Democratic Party	--	--	--	Lost; R. George
1975	7th District	Independent	306	64.0%	+136	Won
1979	9th District	Independent	403	70.8%	+234	Won
1983	9th District	Virgin Islands Party	unopposed			Won
1986	9th District	United Party	337	47%	+91	Won
1990	9th District	Virgin Islands Party	445	50.9%	+28	Won
1995	9th District	Virgin Islands Party	534	66.1%	+282	Won
1999	9th District	Virgin Islands Party	617	66.2%	+317	Won
2003	9th District	Virgin Islands Party	596	60.8%	+226	Won
2007	9th District	Virgin Islands Party	476	47%	+9	Won
2011	9th District	Virgin Islands Party	565	49.3%	+28	Won

Political offices
Preceded by Hamilton Lavity Stoutt	Chief Minister of the British Virgin Islands; 1995–2003	Succeeded by Orlando Smith
Preceded by Orlando Smith as Chief Minister of the British Virgin Islands	Premier of the British Virgin Islands; 2007–2011	Succeeded by Orlando Smith
Preceded by H. Lavity Stoutt	Leader of the Opposition; 1986–1988	Succeeded by Conrad Maduro
Preceded by Orlando Smith	Leader of the Opposition; 2003–2007	Succeeded by Orlando Smith
Preceded by Orlando Smith	Leader of the Opposition; 2011–2015	Succeeded by Julian Fraser
Preceded by Reeial George	House of Assembly Member, Anegada and Virgin Gorda; 1975–2015	Succeeded by Hubert O'Neal
