= Constitution of the British Virgin Islands =

The Constitution of the British Virgin Islands is a predominantly codified constitution documented primarily within the Virgin Islands Constitution Order, 2007 a statutory instrument of the United Kingdom. The 2007 Constitution was the fourth written constitution of the British Virgin Islands, and superseded the 1976 constitution. In addition to the constitution itself, a number of the constitutional powers of the British Virgin Islands government are specified a "letter of entrustment" from the Foreign and Commonwealth Office which delegates powers to the British Virgin Islands government to represent itself in certain external affairs.

The 2007 Constitution was adopted as part of a wider consultation between the United Kingdom and the British Overseas Territories. Accordingly, the Constitution is in substantially similar form to the constitutions of a number of other British dependent territories. The Constitution came into force immediately following the dissolution of the old Legislative Council prior to the 2007 general election. The new constitution adopted new nomenclature: the Chief Minister was renamed the premier, the Executive Council was renamed the Cabinet, and the Legislative Council was renamed the House of Assembly.

The Constitution is framed on the classic "separation of powers" precept, although as with other Westminster system constitutions, there is a blurring of the distinctions between legislature and executive.

== Constitutional history ==
The British Virgin Islands has had four written constitutions during its modern history. Although prior to 1954 various constitutional arrangements were made for the territory in relation to its former colonial legislatures and executive councils, there are few direct records remaining in relation to those provisions.

From 1901, when the original Legislative Council was formally dissolved, until 1950 the territory was officially administered as part of the Leeward Islands Federation through the governor of the Leeward Islands. Following civil unrest in 1947 the territory was granted its first modern written constitution in 1950, although at this time it still remained part of the wider Federal Colony of the Leeward Islands.

The main purpose of the 1950 Constitution was to re-devolve power back to the reformed Legislative Council in the British Virgin Islands from the governor of the Leeward Islands. Historically it is regarded a holding measure. It was famously described by McWelling Todman QC as "an instrument minimal in its intent and its effect." Historically it was a part of the process that eventually led to the more fundamental constitutional change. In 1954 the Constitution and Elections Act, 1954, was passed, which provided for universal adult suffrage for the first time in the territory's history (the 1950 general election had been conducted on the basis of votes of landowners who were able to pass a literacy test – scarcely a representative sample of the population as a whole in 1950).

The British government had hoped that after the Leeward Islands Federation was abolished in 1956 the British Virgin Islands would join the new Federation of the West Indies, but there was little enthusiasm for that, and so eventually the 1967 Constitution was promulgated.

The 1967 Constitution was eventually replaced by a revised and updated constitution which came into force on 1 June 1977, and the 1976 Constitution was amended at various points, including in 1994 pursuant to the Elections Act, 1994 to introduce "at-large" representatives into the legislature. The 1976 constitution was in turn superseded in 2007 by the current form which came into force on 15 June 2007.

In 2022 a new constitutional review was undertaken, and the Commission issued its report and recommendations in February 2024.

== Framework ==
The constitution provides for a unicameral House of Assembly (legislature) based upon representative democracy and a multi-party system. The head of state is the British monarch, who is represented in the territory by the governor. The governor appoints as premier and head of government the leader of the party with the largest number of seats in the House of Assembly. Executive authority is vested in the Cabinet which consists of the premier, four other ministers appointed by the governor on the advice of the premier, and the attorney general, ex officio.

== Structure and provisions ==
=== Recitals ===
Prior to the commencement of Chapter I (but after the legal boilerplate Article 1) the Constitution contains a number of recitals relating to the heritage of the British Virgin Islands, which includes a professed national belief in God. The second paragraphs of the recitals contains the words:

[T]he society of the Virgin Islands is based upon certain moral, spiritual and democratic values including a belief in God.

The recitals also contain an express statement: "the people of the territory of the Virgin Islands have over centuries evolved with a distinct cultural identity which is the essence of a Virgin Islander". This operates as a prelude to various provisions in the Constitution which reserve specific rights of privileges to Belongers.

The remainder of the recitals are more generic and common in form to the constitutions of other British Overseas Territories, including "respect for fundamental rights and freedoms and the rule of law", the "quest for social justice, economic empowerment and political advancement", governance based upon "based on adherence to well-established democratic principles and institutions" and "[a] country based on qualities of honesty, integrity, mutual respect, [and] self-reliance".

=== Chapter I: Interpretation ===
The first chapter of the Constitution simply sets out a number of defined terms and generally applicable principles. This includes the definition of "belonger status" under British Virgin Islands law.

=== Chapter II: Fundamental Rights and Freedoms of the Individual ===
The second chapter, which is made up of articles 9–34, lays out the fundamental rights and freedoms of those in the British Virgin Islands. The wording is broadly taken from documents such as the Universal Declaration of Human Rights and the European Convention on Human Rights, although there is a greater emphasis on the right of self-determination. Chapter II expressly reserves the right to the British Virgin Islands Government to legislate in a way which is prejudicial to non-belongers.

Article 27 permits the governor to declare a "state of emergency". The only time this power has ever been exercised was after Hurricane Irma in 2017. However the declaration is required to be either posted in the Gazette or announced on radio – because of the devastation caused by the hurricane neither of those was possible. Accordingly, the declaration had to be "posted in public places".

=== Chapter III: The Governor ===
The third chapter, which is made up of articles 35–45, states that there shall be a governor of the British Virgin Islands and describes the appointment process for that office. The chapter also sets out how the duties and powers of the governor are determined, making reference to the role of the sovereign through the sovereign's secretary of state. Article 37 of the chapter describes the times when an acting governor is required and the appointment process for that position.

=== Chapter IV: The Executive ===
The fourth chapter, which is made up of articles 46–61, sets out the structure and composition of the Executive. Article 46 provides that executive authority is vested in the British monarch, and exercised through the governor. The remainder of the chapter sets out the appointment of Cabinet, which is constituted by the premier, four other ministers, and the attorney general ex officio.

The premier is appointed by the governor as the head of the largest party in the House of Assembly. Other ministers are appointed by the governor on the advice of the premier.

=== Chapter V: The Legislature ===
The fifth chapter, which is made up of articles 62–88, sets out the regulation and procedures of the House of Assembly, giving the House of Assembly the power to make laws, describing the sittings, voting and the quorum of the House of Assembly, as well as detailing the role and election of the speaker of the Legislative Assembly. The House of Assembly is unicameral. The governor has reserve powers to disallow laws passed by the House of Assembly and (in an emergency) to declare laws to have been passed in accordance with the constitution.

The chapter sets out both the qualifications and disqualifications for elected membership. It also confirms that the governor, acting on advice of the premier, has power to prorogue and dissolve the House of Assembly. The House of Assembly must be dissolved within four years of first sitting, and fresh general elections held. General elections must be held within two months, but not earlier than 21 days, after dissolution.

The Constitution does not make express provision for privileges and immunities of the House of Assembly, but permits the Legislature to make laws to determine the same, provided always that such laws do not exceed the position in relation to the House of Commons of the United Kingdom.

=== Chapter VI: The Judiciary ===
The sixth chapter, which is made up of articles 89 and 90, sets out the provisions relating to the judiciary. This simply provides for the continuing authority of the Eastern Caribbean Supreme Court in the British Virgin Islands.

=== Chapter VII: The Public Service ===
The seventh chapter, which is made up of articles 91–101, specifies that there shall be a Public Service Commission, a Teaching Service Commission, a Judicial and Legal Services Commission and a Police Service Commission. The power to appoint, remove and exercise disciplinary control over the public offices judiciary, the police force is vested in the governor who shall ordinarily exercise that power on the advice of the relevant commission (there is no equivalent power for teaching posts).

=== Chapter VIII: Finance ===
The eighth chapter, which is made up of articles 102–109, regulates the powers of the Government of the British Virgin Islands over the public finances. The chapter provides for the Consolidated Fund for the storage of public funds, and article 104 regulates the authorisation of expenditure.

Article 106 creates a Contingencies Fund, to be used in the event of an urgent and unforeseen need for expenditure. Use of the fund requires the approval of the House of an Assembly by way of an appropriation bill.

=== Chapter IX: Complaints Commissioner ===
The ninth chapter, which is made up of articles 110–112, sets out the procedure for the appointment of a complaints commissioner and describes its process and function. The first complaints commissioner was the former deputy governor Elton Georges. In May 2015 he was replaced by Sheila Brathwaite. The complaints commissioner appears to be the least well functioning part of the Constitution; although complaints are reported and then investigated, the usual outcome is that the relevant government department simply ignores the findings.

=== Chapter X: Miscellaneous ===
The tenth and final chapter, which is made up of articles 113–119, deals principally with revocations and the continuing validity of existing laws and offices and officers. Article 119, the final article, provides:

There is reserved to Her Majesty full power to make laws for the peace, order and good government of the Virgin Islands.

== Public offices ==
The Constitution provides for various public offices in the British Virgin Islands. These include:

- Governor
- Deputy Governor
- Premier
- Ministers of Government
- Cabinet Secretary
- Attorney General
- Director of Public Prosecutions
- Speaker of the House of Assembly
- Deputy Speaker of the House of Assembly
- Leader of the Opposition
- Auditor General
- Complaints Commissioner

== Commissions, councils and committees ==
The Constitution also provides for various public commissions and committees. These include:

- a human rights commission
- an advisory committee on the prerogative of mercy
- a National Security Council
- a Public Service Commission
- a Teaching Service Commission
- a Judicial and Legal Services Commission
- a Police Services Commission

== Amendments ==
The 2007 constitution has never been amended (although previous constitutions had been), nor have any of the letters delegating authority to the territory to manage its external affairs. However, in 2010 the premier at the time, Ralph O'Neal, publicly stated that the constitution may soon have to be amended to delegate further powers to the territory from the United Kingdom. In 2016 the subsequent premier, Orlando Smith, also called for further constitutional review.

== External Affairs ==
Under the Constitution the governor is given responsibility for all external affairs, and in practice this power is exercised by or under the direction of the Foreign and Commonwealth Office. However, the Constitution also provides that this power is then to be delegated by the governor either to the premier or a minister of government in relation to a number of specific areas:

1. the Caribbean Community, the Organisation of Eastern Caribbean States, the Association of Caribbean States, the United Nations Economic Commission for Latin America and the Caribbean, or any other Caribbean regional organisation or institution;
2. other Caribbean regional affairs relating specifically to issues that are of interest to or affect the Virgin Islands;
3. the relationship between the British Virgin Islands and the United States Virgin Islands in matters of mutual interest;
4. tourism and tourism-related matters;
5. taxation and the regulation of finance and financial services; and
6. European Union matters directly affecting the interests of the British Virgin Islands.

Pursuant to a "letter of entrustment" dated 13 June 2007 the British government has devolved wide discretion to the government of the territory to manage its own external affairs, and adds that the British government would give "sympathetic consideration" for requests to take action on other matters.

== Constitutional challenges ==
In the comparatively brief history of the 2007 constitution, there has only been one legal challenge brought against it to date. In 2012 two police officers brought proceedings against the acting chief of police, David Morris, and the governor, Boyd McCleary, alleging that the Police Service (Delegation of Powers) Regulations, 2012 were unlawful under article 97(5) of the Constitution. Their claim eventually failed.

== Hickinbottom Report ==
In the British Virgin Islands 2021 Commission of Inquiry, Sir Gary Hickinbottom recommended that the territory's constitution be suspended and reviewed.
