= Orlando Smith =

British Virgin Islands politician (born 1944)

The Honourable Orlando Smith OBE
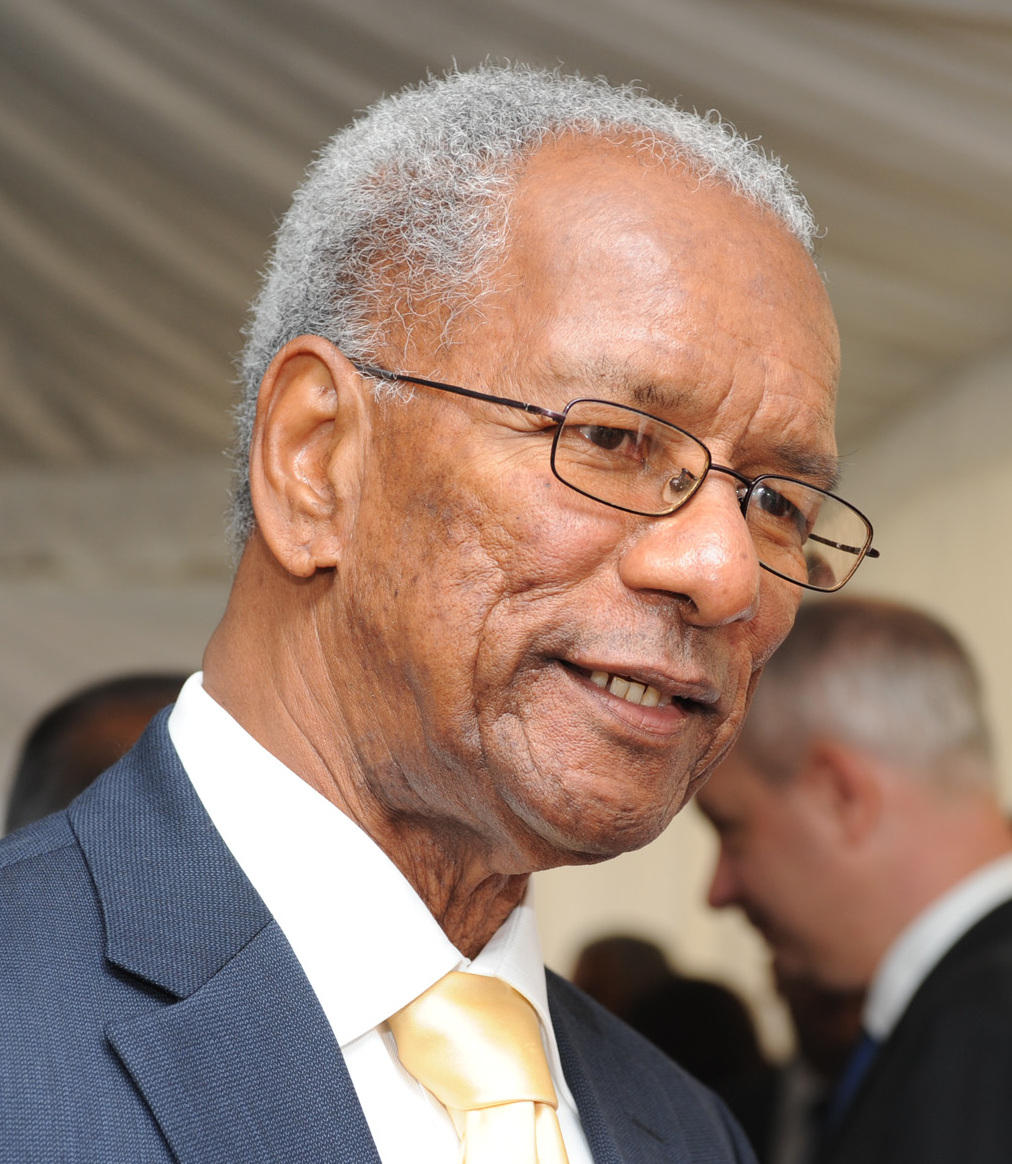

Premier of the British Virgin Islands
- In office 9 November 2011 – 26 February 2019
- Monarch: Elizabeth II
- Governor: John Duncan; Augustus Jaspert
- Preceded by: Ralph O'Neal
- Succeeded by: Andrew Fahie
- In office 17 June 2003 – 23 August 2007
- Monarch: Elizabeth II
- Governor: Tom Macan; Dancia Penn (Acting); David Pearey
- Preceded by: Ralph O'Neal
- Succeeded by: Ralph O'Neal (Premier)

Personal details
- Born: 28 August 1944 (age 81) Tortola, British Virgin Islands
- Party: National Democratic
- Spouse: Lorna Smith
- Children: 3

Daniel Orlando Smith, OBE (born 28 August 1944) is a British Virgin Islands politician who served as Premier of the Virgin Islands from 2003 to 2007, and 2011 to 2019. As leader of the National Democratic Party he Leader of the Opposition from 1999 to 2003, and 2007 to 2011.

== Early life and education ==
He was educated at British Virgin Islands High School from 1955 to 1961. He attended the University of the West Indies from 1963 to 1969, the Royal College of Surgeons of Edinburgh from 1971 to 1974, The Royal School of Public Health from 1972 to 1973, and the London School of Hygiene & Tropical Medicine from 1984 to 1985.

At Peebles Hospital Smith was a medical officer from 1970 to 1971. He was a medical officer in London from 1971 to 1974. He was a senior registrar of surgery in the British Virgin Islands from 1975 to 1975, and worked as a surgeon from 1979 to 1999.

== Career ==
Smith was a founding member of the National Democratic Party (NDP). As head of the NDP Smith was the Leader of the Opposition after winning a seat in the House of Assembly of the British Virgin Islands in the 1999 election.

From 2003 to 2007, and 2011 to 2019, Smith was the Premier of the Virgin Islands. He was leader of the opposition from 2007 to 2011. Smith led a trade mission to South Africa, Kenya, and Nigeria in 2018; it was the first trade mission the British Virgin Islands sent to Africa.

Smith declined to seek reelection as leader of the NDP on 23 June 2018, and was succeeded by Myron Walwyn. Smith did not contest the 2019 election.

== Personal life ==
Queen Elizabeth II included Smith in the New Year Honours list in 2000. The Order of the British Empire was awarded to him. Peebles Hospital was renamed in honour of him in 2019. He is married and is the father of three children.

== Electoral history ==
D. Orlando Smith electoral history
Year	District	Party	Votes	Percentage	Winning/losing margin	Result
1999	At-large	National Democratic Party	3,094	12.93%	+1,997*	Won (1st)
2003	At-large	National Democratic Party	4,300	14.72%	+1,026*	Won (1st)
2007	At-large	National Democratic Party	3,549	12.29%	+18*	Won (4th)
2011	At-large	National Democratic Party	5,117	14.7%	+1,247*	Won (1st)
2015	At-large	National Democratic Party	5,753	15.95%	+2,333*	Won (2nd)
* For at-large candidates (general elections) who won, this is the vote differential from the 5th placed candidate (i.e. the candidate with the highest number of votes who was not elected). For at-large candidates who lose, this is the vote differential from the 4th placed candidate (i.e. the candidate with the lowest number of votes who was elected).

== Works cited ==
=== News ===
- "BVI to send first trade mission To Africa". The Virgin Islands Daily News. 24 September 2018. Archived from the original on 30 June 2025.
- "Premier D. Orlando Smith's final address to the BVI". The Virgin Islands Daily News. 19 February 2019. Archived from the original on 30 June 2025.
- Greenaway, Dean (29 April 2023). "Skelton named Opposition Leader for BVI's House of Assembly". The Virgin Islands Daily News. Archived from the original on 30 June 2025.
- Greenaway, Dean (25 June 2018). "Walwyn replaces Smith as head of BVI's ruling party". The Virgin Islands Daily News. Archived from the original on 30 June 2025.
- Smith, Davion (19 June 2018). "Premier not seeking re-election as NDP leader". BVI News. Archived from the original on 29 June 2025.
- Ulrich, Amanda (31 January 2019). "Hospital to be renamed after Dr. Smith". BVI Beacon. Archived from the original on 30 June 2025.

=== Web ===
- "Dr. the Honourable D Orlando Smith, OBE, MHA". British Virgin Islands. Archived from the original on 3 April 2016.
- "Hon. D. Orlando Smith, OBE, MHA,". Oyster BVI. Archived from the original on 29 August 2016.

Political offices
Preceded by Ralph O'Neal	Chief Minister of the British Virgin Islands; 2003–2007	Succeeded by Ralph O'Neal as Premier of the British Virgins Islands
Preceded by Ralph O'Neal	Premier of the British Virgin Islands; 2011–2019	Succeeded by Andrew Fahie
Preceded by E. Walwyn Brewley	Leader of the Opposition; 1999–2003	Succeeded by Ralph O'Neal
Preceded by Ralph O'Neal	Leader of the Opposition; 2007–2011	Succeeded by Ralph O'Neal
