= Sharie De Castro =

Economist and model

- Born: 31 December 1990 (age 35); Road Town, British Virgin Islands
- Beauty pageant titleholder
- Title: Miss British Virgin Islands 2012; Miss Caribbean World 2013
- Hair color: Brown
- Eye color: Brown
- Major competitions: Miss British Virgin Islands 2012; Miss Universe 2013; Miss Caribbean World 2013

Minister for Education, Youth Affairs and Sports
- Incumbent
- Assumed office 5 May 2022
- Preceded by: Natalio Wheatley

Junior Minister of Tourism
- In office 26 February 2019 – 5 May 2022
- Succeeded by: Alvera Maduro-Caines

Sharie De Castro (born 31 December 1990) is a Virgin Islander beauty pageant titleholder and politician. She was crowned Miss British Virgin Islands 2012 and represented the British Virgin Islands in the 2013 Miss Universe pageant. She is an At-large representative for the House of Assembly of the British Virgin Islands, a position that she has held since the 2019 general election. She is the current Minister for Education, Youth Affairs and Sports.

== Early life ==
Sharie is a graduate of Texas Christian University. She's a member of Delta Sigma Theta sorority. She was employed at Elmore Stoutt High School.

== Pageant career ==
The finals of Miss British Virgin Islands 2012 held at Multi Purpose Sports Complex in Road Town on 5 August 2012. As well as the title, she also won Miss Congeniality, People's Choice, Miss Poise, Best BVI Promotion, Best Talent, Best Interview (prelim) and Miss Intellect (composed of Best Introduction, Question and Answer and Pre-done interview).

The final of the 8th Annual Miss Caribbean World 2013 was held at Multi Purpose Sports Complex in Road Town on 4 May 2013. As well as the title, she also won Miss Poise, Best Talent, Best Evening Wear and Miss Intellect and tied with Miss Dominica in the Best Swimwear category.

Awards and achievements
Preceded by Abigail Hyndman	Miss British Virgin Islands; 2012	Succeeded by Rosanna Chichester
