= Dawn Smith =

British Virgin Islands lawyer

27th Attorney General of the British Virgin Islands
- Incumbent
- Assumed office 1 October 2020
- Appointed by: Augustus Jaspert
- Monarchs: Elizabeth II; Charles III
- Premier: Andrew Fahie; Natalio Wheatley
- Preceded by: Baba Aziz

Personal details
- Born: Road Town, Tortola, British Virgin Islands
- Education: University of the West Indies (LEC, LLB); Middlebury College (BLA)

Dawn Smith is a British Virgin Islander lawyer who serves as the Attorney General of the British Virgin Islands since 2020.

== Early life and education ==
Smith was born at Peebles Hospital in Road Town, Tortola, British Virgin Islands. She holds a Legal Education Certificate from Norman Manley Law School in Kingston, Jamaica, a Bachelor of Laws, Upper Second Class Honours from the University of the West Indies, Barbados; and Bachelor of Liberal Arts, cum laude with Highest Honours in Sociology-Anthropology from Middlebury College, Middlebury, Vermont, USA.

== Career ==
Smith worked as an attorney at O'Neal Webster O'Neal Myers Fletcher & Gordon from 1997 to 2001. From 2002 to 2006 and again from 2009 to 2012, she was an attorney at Conyers Dill & Pearman, from 2006 to 2009 she served as director of the London office. From 2013 to 2020, she was general counsel at the Financial Services Commission. From 2017 to 2019, she served as acting permanent secretary of the premier's office, where she supervised and coordinated the work of departments under the premier's portfolio; preparing and managing the ministry's annual budget; developing and implementing strategic plans and serving as an ex-officio member on statutory boards and organisations such as the BVI Tourist Board and BVI Finance.

=== Attorney General ===
In May 2020, Smith was selected as attorney general, with the premier naming a Virgin Islander. On 18 September 2020, Smith was appointed by Augustus Jaspert as Attorney General of the British Virgin Islands, effective 1 October 2020. She was sworn in on 1 October 2020. She is the seventh woman to be appointed as attorney general.

Legal offices
Preceded by Baba Aziz	Attorney General of the British Virgin Islands; 2020–present	Incumbent
