= Premier of the Virgin Islands =

Head of government of the British Virgin Islands

- Arms of His Majesty's; British Virgin Islands Government

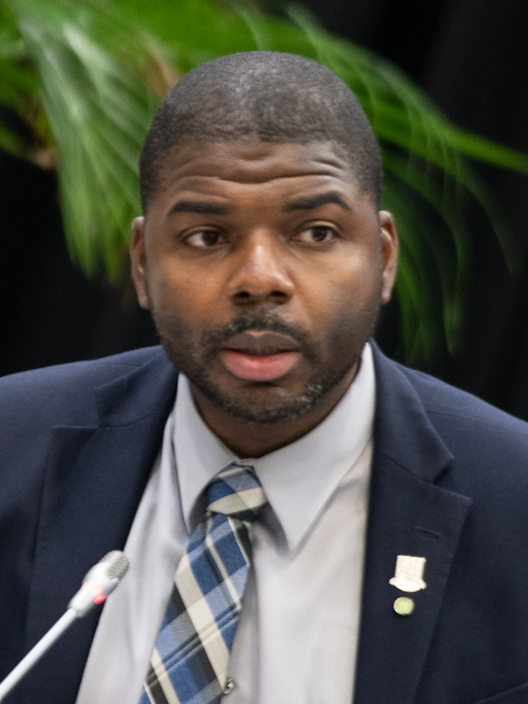
- Incumbent; Natalio Wheatley since 5 May 2022
- Style: The Honourable
- Appointer: Governor of the Virgin Islands
- Term length: At the governor's pleasure; Normally 4 years
- Formation: 14 April 1967
- First holder: Hamilton Lavity Stoutt as Chief Minister
- Website: Office of the Premier

The Premier of the Virgin Islands is the head of government for the British Virgin Islands. As a British Overseas Territory, the Premier is appointed by the Governor on behalf of the British monarch, currently King Charles III. Until 2007, the head of government was known as the Chief Minister of the Virgin Islands, but a constitutional change in 2007 renamed the position as Premier.

The current Premier is Natalio Wheatley. He is serving since 5 May 2022.

== History of the office ==
Since the 1967 constitution was adopted, only seven different people (all men) have served as Premier or Chief Minister. Prior to 1967, executive power in the British Virgin Islands was held by the British appointed Commissioner of the Virgin Islands, advised by the partially-elected Legislative Council. In 1967, the Virgin Islands Constitution Order was passed in order to introduce ministerial governance to the colony. The office of Chief Minister of the Virgin Islands was created for the leader of the largest elected party in the new Legislative Assembly. The Chief Minister would be appointed by the Administrator (later Governor of the Virgin Islands). H. Lavity Stoutt has won the most general elections of any leader (he won five), followed by Orlando Smith (three).

During negotiations for the 2007 constitutional reforms, there were proposals that the Premier would chair the Cabinet of the British Virgin Islands with the Governor only being advised and provided information about meetings. However, due to internal disagreements within the BVI party, it was instead agreed that the Premier would be just an ordinary member of the Cabinet while the Governor would be the non-voting chairman.

== List ==
(Dates in italics indicate de facto continuation of office)

UP VIDP VIP NDP
No.	Portrait	Name (Birth–Death)	Term of office (Note: Duration of terms are calculated as commencing on the date of the election; not the actual subsequent date of appointment by the Governor, which is usually a few days later.)			Political party	Elected	Notes
No.	Portrait	Name (Birth–Death)	Took office	Left office	Time in office	Political party	Elected	Notes
Chief Ministers (1967–2007)
1		H. Lavity Stoutt (1929–1995)	14 April 1967	2 June 1971	4 years, 49 days	United Party	1967	First tenure
2		Willard Wheatley (1915–1997)	2 June 1971	12 November 1979	8 years, 163 days	VI Democratic Party	1971; 1975	
(2)		Willard Wheatley (1915–1997)	2 June 1971	12 November 1979	8 years, 163 days	United Party (Note: Wheatley led a coalition of himself plus the VI Democratic Party in the 1971 election and then another coalition of himself plus the United Party in the 1975 election.)	1971; 1975	
(1)		H. Lavity Stoutt (1929–1995)	12 November 1979	11 November 1983	3 years, 364 days	Virgin Islands Party	1979	Second tenure
3		Cyril Romney (1931–2007)	11 November 1983	17 November 1986	3 years, 6 days	United Party	1983	
(1)		H. Lavity Stoutt (1929–1995)	17 November 1986	14 May 1995	8 years, 178 days	Virgin Islands Party	1986; 1990; 1995	Third tenure. Died in office
4		Ralph T. O'Neal (1933–2019)	15 May 1995	17 June 2003	8 years, 33 days	Virgin Islands Party	1999	
5		D. Orlando Smith (born 1944)	17 June 2003	23 August 2007	4 years, 67 days	National Democratic Party	2003	
Premiers (2007–present)
1		Ralph T. O'Neal (1933–2019)	23 August 2007	9 November 2011	4 years, 78 days	Virgin Islands Party	2007	
2		D. Orlando Smith (born 1944)	9 November 2011	25 February 2019	7 years, 108 days	National Democratic Party	2011; 2015	
3		Andrew Fahie (born 1970)	26 February 2019	5 May 2022	3 years, 69 days	Virgin Islands Party	2019	
4		Natalio Wheatley (born 1980)	5 May 2022	Incumbent	4 years, 194 days	Virgin Islands Party	2023	

All previous Chief Ministers or Premiers have served at least two terms except for Cyril Romney and Andrew Fahie.

No.	Name	General election victories	Total time in office (days)
1	Lavity Stoutt	5	6,117
2	Ralph O'Neal	2	4,494
3	Orlando Smith	3	4,194
4	Willard Wheatley	2	3,085
5	Natalio Wheatley	1	1,655
6	Andrew Fahie	1	1,164
7	Cyril Romney	1	1,055

== See also ==
- List of current heads of government in the United Kingdom and dependencies
- Politics of the British Virgin Islands
- Governor of the Virgin Islands
