= Sandra Ward =

British Virgin Islands civil servant

Cabinet Secretary of the British Virgin Islands
- Incumbent
- Assumed office 23 January 2012
- Preceded by: Otto O'Neal

Personal details
- Occupation: civil servant

Sandra I. Ward is a British Virgin Islands civil servant.

== Biography ==
Ward joined the public service in July 1988 as an information officer. In 2002, Ward was made private secretary to the chief minister. In June 2009, she became deputy secretary in the Premier’s Office. In 2011, Ward was appointed Permanent Secretary of the Premier’s Office. On 23 January 2012, she was named the new cabinet secretary. She is the first woman to hold the role. Ward is head of the cabinet office. She is a member of the Cabinet of the British Virgin Islands. In the role she attends cabinet meetings.
