= Luce Hodge-Smith =

British Virgin Islands politician

Luce Hodge-Smith MHA

Member of the House of Assembly of the British Virgin Islands
- Incumbent
- Assumed office 24 April 2023

Junior Minister for Culture and Tourism
- Incumbent
- Assumed office 2023

Personal details
- Party: Virgin Islands Party

Luce D. Hodge-Smith is a British Virgin Islands politician.

== Biography ==
Hodge-Smith was elected in the 2023 British Virgin Islands general election for the Fourth District. Hodge-Smith was appointed Junior Minister for Culture and Tourism by Natalio Wheatley.
