= The Virgin Islands Official Gazette =

Government gazette of the British Virgin Islands

The Virgin Islands Official Gazette is the government gazette of the British Virgin Islands.

== History ==
The Gazette has been published in Tortola since 9 March 1967 under the provisions of Section 2 of the Interpretation and General Clauses Act 1955. It replaced The Antigua, Montserrat and Virgin Islands Official Gazette which was published in Antigua for the then West Indies Federation.

== See also ==
- List of British colonial gazettes
