= Carvin Malone =

British Virgin Islands politician (1959–2024)

Minister for Health and Social Development
- In office 2019–2022

Personal details
- Born: 12 June 1959
- Died: 14 January 2024 (aged 64) Road Town, British Virgin Islands
- Party: Virgin Islands Party

Carvin Malone (12 June 1959 – 14 January 2024) was a British Virgin Islands politician, who served as a Member of the House of Assembly of the British Virgin Islands from 2019 until 2023.

Malone died at the Dr. D. Orlando Smith Hospital on 14 January 2024, at the age of 64. He was given an official funeral.
