= Myron Walwyn =

British Virgin Islander government official

Myron Vernel Walwyn (born 22 February 1972) is a Virgin Islander politician and Attorney who has served as Leader of the Opposition since March 2025. He is the former Minister of Education and Culture and Member for the Sixth District in the House of Assembly of the British Virgin Islands. He was elected as an "at-large" representative in the 2011 British Virgin Islands general election, garnering 4,605 votes, the 2nd highest number of votes in the election. He was re-elected again in 2015 where he garnered 5,777 votes, the highest number of votes ever received by any candidate in an election in the British Virgin Islands. He is a member of the National Democratic Party. Prior to election, he was appointed the Chairman of the British Virgin Islands Tourist Board.

On 23 June 2018, after Premier Orlando Smith announced he was stepping down, Walwyn was elected as the new President of the National Democratic Party, although Orlando Smith remained Premier. However he subsequently lost his seat in the 2019 general election. In 2023, he was elected to represent the Sixth District in the HOA.

== Education ==
He received a Bachelor of Laws degree from the University of Wolverhampton. Post graduate work includes a Post Graduate Diploma from BPP Law School (London, England) and a Hospitality Executive Training Certificate from Cornell University.

== Career ==
Walwyn is a founder and partner at Orion Law Barristers and Solicitors and owner of MVW International, a hospitality firm. Walwyn started his career as a bus boy in a local restaurant. After law school, he served as a trainee lawyer at Harney Westwood and Riegels LLP Barristers & Solicitors, London, England and as Crown Counsel in the Office of the Director of Public Prosecutions Government of the Virgin Islands.

Myron was called to the Bar of England and Wales and to the Bar of the Eastern Caribbean Supreme Court in 2007.

Walwyn's previous experience in the hospitality industry landed him a job as a senior manager at Treasure Isle Hotel and Restaurant when he returned to the BVI in the 1990s. At the age of 24 he went into partnership with local businessman, Al Henley and the two opened Big Banana Bar and Restaurant in Cane Garden Bay, Tortola. A few years later, Myron formed his hospitality management company, MVW International.

For the last 12 years, his company has operated several established businesses in the BVI including the Moorings Mariner Hotel and Restaurant, Cafesito Restaurant, Calypso Cafe (formerly Nexus Café, Bar and Grill), Charlie's Italian Restaurant and the newly opened Ginny's Tapas Bar.

== Controversy ==
In November 2022 Walwyn was arrested and charged with breach of trust by a public officer in relation the controversial High School perimeter wall project which had occurred whilst he was Minister of Education. In a formal statement Walwyn acknowledged that there had been procedural issues, but asserted that he did "not believe that any of those procedural issues warranted or met the criteria of Breach of Trust to justify such a charge".

On 20 January 2025 the Chief Magistrate ruled that Walwyn had no case to answer after reviewing the prosecution evidence or lack thereof and a no case submission made by Attorney Terrence Williams (KC) who represented Walwyn in the matter.

== Personal ==
Walwyn was born in Road Town, Tortola and grew up at the family home in Freebottom. At age 14, Myron was relocated to his mother's birthplace of Antigua to complete his secondary school education.

At 15 years old, Walwyn found employment at a well established hotel and restaurant in Antigua working after school to purchase his school supplies, necessary Caribbean Examinations Council exams and living needs. Ever determined, he was able to work his way up the ranks and before his high school graduation from the Princess Margaret Secondary School in 1990, had a complement of staff under his supervision. It was also during this time, that the exposure to the hospitality fueled his passion for the industry.

== Electoral history ==
Myron Walwyn electoral history
| Year | District | Party | Votes | Percentage | Winning/losing margin | Result |
|---|---|---|---|---|---|---|
| 2011 | At-large | National Democratic Party | 4,605 | 13.3% | +841* | Won (2nd) |
| 2015 | At-large | National Democratic Party | 5,777 | 16.0% | +2,357* | Won (1st) |
| 2019 | At-large | National Democratic Party | 3,335 | 8.6% | -601* | Lost |
| 2023 | District 6 | National Democratic Party | 736 | 63.7% | +317 | Won |
* For at-large candidates (general elections) who won, this is the vote differential from the 5th placed candidate (i.e. the candidate with the highest number of votes who was not elected). For at-large candidates who lose, this is the vote differential from the 4th placed candidate (i.e. the candidate with the lowest number of votes who was elected).
