= House of Assembly of the British Virgin Islands =

Legislative body

House of Assembly of the Virgin Islands
- 5th House of Assembly

Type
- Type: Unicameral
- Sovereign: Monarch of the United Kingdom
- Established: 1950

Leadership
- Speaker: Corine George-Massicote since 26 May 2022
- Deputy Speaker: Stacy Mather, PVIM since 18 May 2023
- Premier: Natalio Wheatley, VIP since 5 May 2022
- Leader of the Opposition: Ronnie Skelton, PVIM since 27 April 2023

Structure
- Seats: 15
- Political groups: Government (7) VIP (7) Opposition (6) PVIM (3) NDP (2) PU (1) Ex officio (2) Ex officio (2)

Elections
- Voting system: FPTP (9), plurality block voting (4), ex officio members (2)
- Last election: 24 April 2023

Meeting place
- Richard C. Stoutt Building, Road Town, Tortola

Website
- www.legco.gov.vg

The House of Assembly of the British Virgin Islands, until 2007 known as the Legislative Council, has 15 members: 13 directly elected for four-year terms (nine in single-seat constituencies and four "at large"), and two ex officio members (the Attorney General and a Speaker chosen from outside the house).

Sittings of the House of Assembly are divided into "terms" with each term following from a general election. The House of Assembly is presently sitting its fourth term, but the first term of the House of Assembly followed the 15th term of the old Legislative Council. Accordingly, in aggregate the legislature is sitting its 19th term since the restoration of democracy in the Territory. Each term has a series of "sittings". At the end of each sitting the House is either prorogued until the next sitting, or dissolved for a general election.

The Corine George-Massicote was elected Speaker of the House on 26 May 2022. The official record is Hansard.

== Latest elections ==
Party	District			At-large			Total seats	+/–
Party	Votes	%	Seats	Votes	%	Seats	Total seats	+/–
Virgin Islands Party	3,632	39.60	5	11,576	31.90	1	6	–2
Progressive Virgin Islands Movement	1,546	16.86	1	12,405	34.18	2	3	+2
National Democratic Party	2,668	29.09	2	9,464	26.08	1	3	0
Progressives United	459	5.00	1				1	0
Independents	866	9.44	0	2,844	7.84	0	0	0
Speaker and Attorney General							2	0
Total	9,171	100.00	9	36,289	100.00	4	15	0

== History ==
The history of legislatures in the British Virgin Islands can be roughly divided into two: colonial legislatures in the 18th and 19th centuries, and then a hiatus, followed by the modern legislature after the re-introduction of democracy in 1950.

=== Colonial legislatures ===
There was no attempt to impose any form of local legislature prior to the British taking control of the islands in 1672. But in 1735 the Governor of the Leeward Islands, William Matthew, sought to establish executive councils and legislative assemblies in Virgin Gorda and Tortola. The assemblies were to consist of nine members, elected by the free inhabitants of the islands. After the elections, it was determined that the governor had no such power and therefore the assemblies were ultra vires and were never called into session (although the councils did take up their duties).

During the 18th and 19th centuries the British Virgin Islands had a number of legislative councils, but these proved to be largely ineffective, and the last one was formally dissolved in 1901.

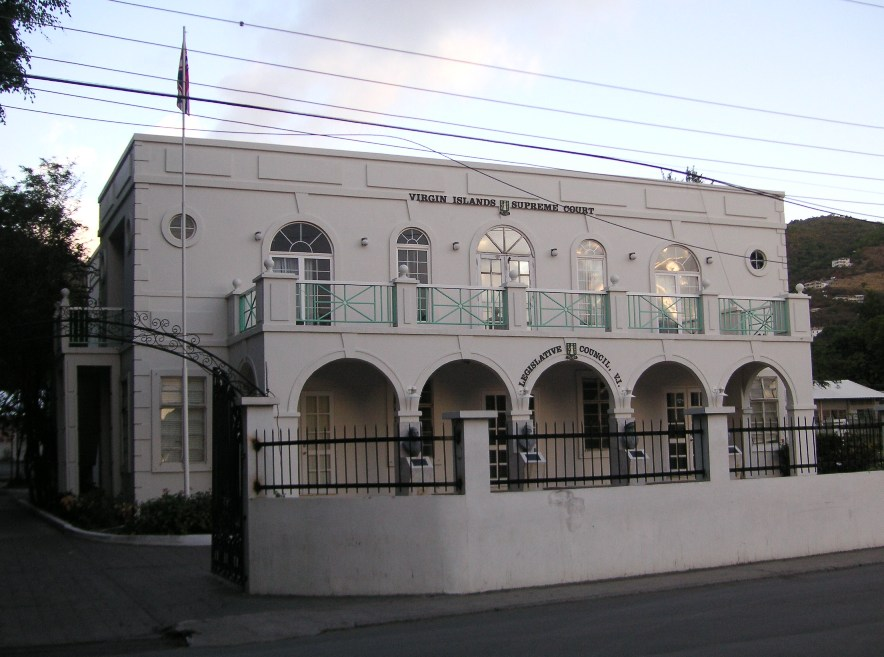
House of Assembly (the former Legislative Council) building, the High Court is located upstairs.

Between 1747 and 1754 Lieutenant Governor James Purcell pressed for some form of formal government in the British Virgin Islands, but in this he was rebuffed by Governor George Thomas. But by 1773 the new Leeward Islands Governor, Sir Ralph Payne, was instructed to introduce a system of representative government in the Virgin Islands, consisting of a governor, an appointed council, and an elected assembly. On 30 November 1773 legislation was introduced which provided for, amongst other things, an eleven-member assembly (eight for Tortola, two for Virgin Gorda and one for Jost Van Dyke), with various qualification to vote or to stand. The assembly opened on 31 January 1774, but got off to an inauspicious start. After an impassioned speech from Governor Payne about the need for immediate action to pass laws for good government, the legislature (consisting of plantation owners) almost immediately fell into stalemate with the governor over a tax bill and confirmation of land titles. Accordingly, the legislature refused to pass legislation to establish a court system. Powers were eventually conferred on the governor to create a court system directly, which led to further mistrust and division between the plantation owners in the legislature on the one hand, and the governor and the newly appointed judge on the other.

In around 1783 the legislature was reconstituted with 15 members and districts were redrawn, and a certain amount of détente emerged. In 1815 (after the abolition of the trade in African slaves, but prior to the abolition of slavery itself) the territory was inhabited by an increasing number of free blacks who petitioned for civil rights, and in 1818 their request was granted and free black men were permitted to vote, although they could still only vote for white landowners. It appears that this may not have been so much of a great leap forward in civil rights so much as an attempt to shore up interest in the legislature, which was being increasingly abandoned and marginalised by the plantation owners at this time.

By 1867, when the Territory was struck by a fierce hurricane, "all pretence to the operation of a Legislative Council in which there were elected representatives came to an end". Legislation was passed reconstituting the assembly again so that it consisted of three official members and three appointed members, but with no elections. In 1871 a single federal colony consisting of all the Leeward Islands was created, and tellingly the Virgin Islands was not given a seat at this assembly. In 1902 the Federal Council formally abolished the local Virgin Islands legislature and council, neither of which had met for many years by that time. It was grimly noted that the legislature "had practically nothing of any real importance ... to legislate about and the functions of the executive was the maintenance of law and order and the collection of taxes from miserably poor people".

=== 1950 onwards ===
The first Legislative Council of modern times was formed in 1950 pursuant to the Constitution Act, 1950. It had eight members: two ex officio members, two nominated members and four elected members. Requirements for standing for election included income, property, and a deposit (forfeited with failure to garner a certain percentage of votes). The four members were elected in 1950 on a Territory-wide basis.

In 1954 the existing constitutional provisions were replaced by the Constitution and Elections Ordinance, 1954 which expanded the elected membership to six, divided amongst five district seats (with Road Town having two representatives).

The 1967 Constitution expanded the elected membership to seven, with each district having a single representative. In 1977 the Elections Ordinance increased the number of district seats to nine.

Pursuant to the Elections Act, 1994 the British Virgin Islands introduced four territorial at-large seats in addition to the nine district seats, making a total of 13 elected members to sit alongside the two ex officio members (the Speaker and the Attorney General). The introduction of the territorial at-large seats was bitterly opposed by the Chief Minister of the day, Lavity Stoutt.

=== Modern legislatures ===
British Virgin Islands legislatures
Election	Years	Term	Elected seats
Legislative Council
1950	1950–1954	First	4 – Four at-large
1954	1954–1957	Second	5 – Five territorial
1957	1957–1960	Third	5 – Five territorial
1960	1960–1963	Fourth	5 – Five territorial
1963	1963–1967	Fifth	5 – Five territorial
1967	1967–1971	Sixth	7 – Seven territorial
1971	1971–1975	Seventh	7 – Seven territorial
1975	1975–1979	Eighth	7 – Seven territorial
1979	1979–1983	Ninth	9 – Nine territorial
1983	1983–1986	Tenth	9 – Nine territorial
1986	1986–1990	Eleventh	9 – Nine territorial
1990	1990–1995	Twelfth	9 – Nine territorial
1995	1995–1999	Thirteenth	13 – Nine territorial plus four at-large
1999	1999–2003	Fourteenth	13 – Nine territorial plus four at-large
2003	2003–2007	Fifteenth	13 – Nine territorial plus four at-large
House of Assembly
2007	2007–2011	First	13 – Nine territorial plus four at-large
2011	2011–2015	Second	13 – Nine territorial plus four at-large
2015	2015–2019	Third	13 – Nine territorial plus four at-large
2019	2019–2023	Fourth	13 – Nine territorial plus four at-large
2023	2023–Present	Five	13 – Nine territorial plus four at-large

== Qualifications ==
=== Qualifications for membership ===
Qualifications to be elected as a member of the House of Assembly are now regulated by article 65 of the Constitution (there are no similar restrictions in relation to the two appointed members). Broadly speaking this requires that the candidate must be a second generation Belonger, and must either be domiciled in the British Virgin Islands or have completed a period of residence.

In order to be elected as a member of the House, a person must either be a Virgin Islander (as defined) over the age of 21, and otherwise qualified to vote in the Territory. For these purposes a "Virgin Islander" means a Belonger who is either:

1. a person who was born in the British Virgin Islands to a mother or father who was a British Overseas Territories Citizen (by birth or descent);
2. a person who was born in the British Virgin Islands to a mother or father who was also a Belonger (by birth or descent); or
3. a person who was born outside of the British Virgin Islands to a mother or father who was also a Belonger (by birth or descent) provided that one of his or grandparents also belonged to the British Virgin Islands by birth.

A person may also be qualified to stand for election if they were qualified to stand under the previous Constitution on the date of the last election before it was repealed. The restrictions under the earlier constitution were much more relaxed (a person only needed to be a Belonger, over the age of 21, and resident and domiciled in the British Virgin Islands), and preserving them was intended to preserve the right of any sitting members of the House from accidentally being disqualified. However, the wording used suggests that any person who was so qualified on the day the 2007 constitution came into effect remains so qualified (i.e. any Belonger who was born before 1986 and was resident and domiciled in the British Virgin Islands on the date the 2007 constitution came into effect).

However, a person shall be disqualified from being elected (regardless of where they are born) if they are not domiciled in the British Virgin Islands unless:

1. in the case of a person who has never been domiciled in the British Virgin Islands, they have resided in the Territory for at least 5 years immediately before the date of their nomination for election; or
2. in the case of a person who was formerly domiciled in the British Virgin Islands, but have lived outside of the Territory for at least 10 years, they have resided in the Territory for at least 3 years immediately before the date of their nomination for election.

The High Court has jurisdiction to hear and determine any questions relating to the eligibility of a person to stand for election as a member. An application to the court may be made by any person who is (a) a registered voter in the relevant district, (b) a person who was a candidate in that district, or (c) the Attorney General.

There are no residency or similar restrictions as to who may stand for any particular district seat. Accordingly, a candidate could stand for election in a district where they did not live, and, theoretically, had never been to.

=== Disqualifications from membership ===
A person is disqualified from being elected as a member of the House if:

1. they hold any public office;
2. they are declared bankrupt in any country;
3. they are adjudged to be of unsound mind in any country;
4. a sentence of death has been imposed upon them, or if they have served a term of imprisonment of at least 12 months within the previous five years;
5. they are disqualified or suspended under the laws of the British Virgin Islands relating to elections offences; or
6. they are a party to, or a partner in a firm, or director or manager of company, with any contract with the Government for a public service (unless they have published a notice in the Gazette or other British Virgin Islands newspaper disclosing the nature of the contract and their interest).

=== Qualifications for voters ===
Qualifications to be registered as a voter in the British Virgin Islands are now regulated by article 68 of the Constitution. A person is qualified to vote if they are a Belonger aged 18 or older, and are resident in either the British Virgin Islands or the United States Virgin Islands.

However a person is disqualified from voting if:

1. they are adjudged to be of unsound mind under British Virgin Islands law;
2. a sentence of death has been imposed upon them, or if they are serving a term of imprisonment of at least 12 months; or
3. they are disqualified or suspended under the laws of the British Virgin Islands relating to elections offences.

Persons are registered to vote in the Territorial district which they reside within.

== District seats ==
Map of electoral constituencies in the British Virgin Islands

The current district seats are as follows:

British Virgin Islands electoral districts
District	Area	Polling Divisions	Current representative
First	Tortola (West)	Zion Hill, Carrot Bay	Karl Dawson; Since 2023
Second	Tortola (West Central) and Jost Van Dyke	Jost Van Dyke, Can Garden Bay, Brewers Bay, Meyers	Melvin Turnbull Jr. Since 2015
Third	Tortola (Central)	Sea Cow's Bay	Julian Fraser; Since 1999
Fourth	Tortola (Central) and Salt Island	Road Town, Salt Island	Luce Hodge-Smith; Since 2023
Fifth	Tortola (Central)	Huntum's Ghut, Long Trench	Kye Rymer; Since 2019
Sixth	Tortola (Central)	Baugher's Bay, Bell Vue	Myron Walwyn; Since 2023
Seventh	Tortola (East)	Long Look	Natalio Wheatley; Since 2019
Eighth	Tortola (East)	East End, Hope Estate	Marlon Penn; Since 2011
Ninth	Virgin Gorda and Anegada	The Valley, North Sound, Anegada	Vincent Wheatley; Since 2019

== At-large seats ==
At-large seats were reintroduced in 1994 pursuant to the Elections Act, 1994. The at-large seats were in addition to the district seats. Candidates had been elected to at-large seats in the 1950 general election, but not subsequently.

At present four seats in the House of Assembly are elected on a territory-wide basis and these are referred to as the at-large seats. Accordingly, at each general election every voter may cast up to five votes: one in relation to the representative for their District, and up to four in favour of candidates standing for the at-large seats (each voter may only vote for any candidate one time - it would not be possible to vote for the same at-large candidate four times). Accordingly, in recent times the at-large seats have tended to work as a swing vote – if one party is more popular than the other Territory-wide, then they will normally win most or all of the at-large seats, which helps ensure that the winning party has a working majority.

The present at-large representatives in the House of Assembly are Stacy Mather, Sharie de Castro, Ronnie Skelton, and Lorna Smith (Stacy Mather was elected for the first time and appointed Deputy Speaker, and Lorna Smith was elected as an NDP candidate, but crossed the floor to form the government with the Virgin Islands Party and was appointed Deputy Premier]]).

== Terms ==
The House of Assembly normally sits in four-year terms. A new term must commence within three months of the dissolution of the House from the previous term. The Governor, acting in accordance with the advice of the Premier, may dissolve the House at any time (thereby calling a "snap election"). However the Governor must dissolve the House within four years of the date when the House first meets after a general election unless it has been dissolved sooner. Once the House is dissolved a general election must be held after at least 21 days, but not more than two months after the dissolution of the House. The next sitting of the House must commence within three months of the dissolution (i.e. a minimum of 28 days and a maximum of 41 days after the general election, depending upon the date of dissolution and the calendar date that the election fell upon).

The House must also be prorogued at least once per calendar year, and this is normally done over the summer.

== Powers ==
The principal power of the House of Assembly is as a legislature. The House is vested with power to enact laws for the Territory. The House also, by implication, has power to amend and revoke existing laws. However, no Bill may be brought before the House, and the House shall not proceed on any Bill, which makes provision for imposing or increasing any tax, or imposing or increasing any charge on the revenues or other funds of the Territory except upon the recommendation of the Minister of Finance.

In 2014 the House of Assembly passed the Law Revision Act, 2014. That legislation purports to confer direct power on the Attorney General to amend primary legislation, ostensibly to tidy up and modernise existing laws. However, it is not yet clear whether the House of Assembly has constitutional power to delegate its law making (and law amending) powers in this manner.

== Procedures ==
A quorum in the House is constituted by seven members. If a sufficient number of members leave a sitting session and do not return such that the number remaining falls below a quorum, the sitting shall be adjourned.

All questions decided by the House are decided by a majority of votes. However, on certain specific matters, only the elected members of the House are eligible to vote:

1. in an election of the Speaker or Deputy Speaker;
2. on a motion for the removal of the Speaker or Deputy Speaker; or
3. on a motion of no confidence.

The House has power to make, amend and revoke Standing Orders for the regulation and orderly conduct of its own business and the dispatch of business. The Speaker or, in her absence, the Deputy Speaker, presides over proceedings. Where both the Speaker and Deputy Speaker are absent, the members of the House may choose any one from amongst their number who is not a Minister to preside.

== See also ==
- List of speakers of the House of Assembly of the British Virgin Islands
