= Kye Rymer =

British Virgin Islands politician

Deputy Premier of the British Virgin Islands
- Incumbent
- Assumed office 6 June 2019

Minister for Communications and Works
- Incumbent
- Assumed office 5 May 2022

Minister for Transportation, Works and Utilities
- In office 1 March 2019 – 5 May 2022

Personal details
- Party: Virgin Islands Party

Kye M. Rymer is a British Virgin Islands politician from the Virgin Islands Party who has served as Deputy Premier of the British Virgin Islands since 6 June 2019.

He is also Member of the House of Assembly of the British Virgin Islands for the Fifth District.
