= National Democratic Party (British Virgin Islands) =

- Leader: Marlon A. Penn
- Founded: 1998
- House of Assembly: 3 / 13

Website
- www.ndpbvisolutions.com

The National Democratic Party (NDP) is a political party in the British Virgin Islands. In the 2019 general election the NDP was voted out of office; it most recently held power after winning the 2015 general election.

== Leadership ==
The party had only one leader for the first 19 years of its existence: Orlando Smith. In June 2018 Orlando Smith announced he would be stepping down, and on 23 June Myron Walwyn was elected as the new party leader. At the same time the title of the party leader was changed from chairman to president. In February 2019, after the territory's general election Marlon A. Penn became the party president due to Myron Walwyn not being successful in the election.

== History ==
Prior to 2011 the party most recently held power after the 2003 general election held on 16 June 2003, the party won 52.4% of popular votes and 8 out of 13 elected seats. It fought that campaign on a platform offering new leadership for the 21st century and promises to clean up corruption and victimisation. The NDP garnered much credit during its time in office for taking a pro-active approach to the development of the offshore finance industry, working closely with the private sector in relation to a number of initiatives. Ultimately however, this was not sufficient to prevent a resounding defeat when it returned to the polls in 2007.

During the party's term of office following the 2003 election, the party's majority was cut to just one in May 2006 when the Hon. Alvin Christopher was removed from his position as Minister of Communications and Works, and at the next meeting of the legislative council he "crossed the floor" to sit with the opposition; both moves are believed to be related to differences of opinion in relation to the Telecommunications Bill 2006 and telecoms liberalisation programme in the British Virgin Islands generally, although neither side has given any public indication of this. Mr Christopher subsequently ran as an independent against the NDP in the 2007 election, and was returned with a handsome majority. During the party's time in office, the loss of Mr Christopher was offset by Hon. Mark Vanterpool leaving the Virgin Islands Party to join the NDP.

The party was ousted from power in the 2007 general election, but was voted back into office in the 2011 general election. It was then re-elected in the 2015 general election with an increased majority.

== Electoral history ==
=== House of Assembly elections ===
Election	Party leader	Votes	%	Seats	+/–	Position	Government
1999	Orlando Smith		37.3%	5 / 13	▲5	▲2nd	Opposition
2003	Orlando Smith		52.4%	8 / 13	▲3	▲1st	Majority government
2007	Orlando Smith	15,836	39.6%	2 / 13	▼6	▼2nd	Opposition
2011	Orlando Smith	22,858	52.5%	9 / 13	▲7	▲1st	Supermajority government
2015	Orlando Smith	27,070	60.2%	11 / 13	▲2	1st	Supermajority government
2019	Myron Walwyn	13,499	28.18%	3 / 13	▼8	▼2nd	Opposition
2023	Marlon Penn	12,132	26.69%	3 / 13	Steady	▼3rd	Opposition
