= Natalio Wheatley =

British Virgin Islands politician

The Honourable Natalio Wheatley MHA
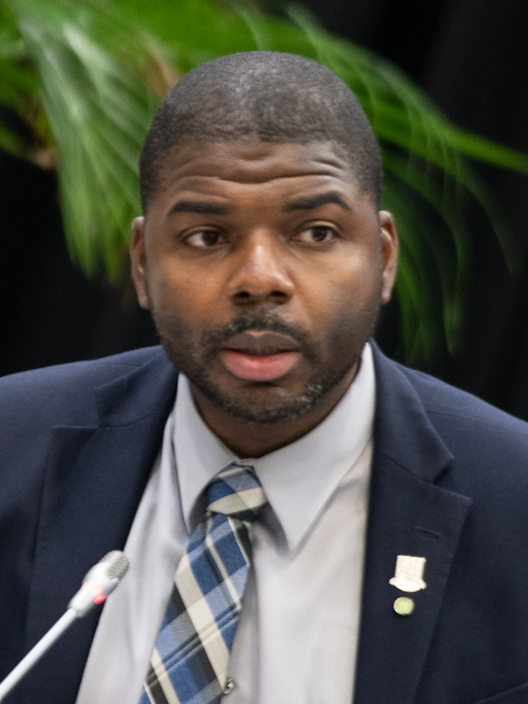
- Wheatley in 2022

Premier of the British Virgin Islands
- Incumbent
- Assumed office 5 May 2022
- Monarchs: Elizabeth II; Charles III
- Governor: John Rankin; Daniel Pruce
- Preceded by: Andrew Fahie

Deputy Premier of the British Virgin Islands
- In office 7 August 2020 – 5 May 2022
- Monarch: Elizabeth II
- Premier: Andrew Fahie
- Governor: Augustus Jaspert; John Rankin
- Preceded by: Carvin Malone
- Succeeded by: Kye Rymer
- In office 6 March 2019 – 6 June 2019
- Monarch: Elizabeth II
- Premier: Andrew Fahie
- Governor: Augustus Jaspert
- Preceded by: Kedrick Pickering
- Succeeded by: Kye Rymer

Personal details
- Born: 2 June 1980 (age 46)
- Party: Virgin Islands Party
- Education: Clark Atlanta University; Purdue University; SOAS University of London

Natalio Dixon Wheatley (born 2 June 1980) is a British Virgin Islands politician currently serving as Premier of the British Virgin Islands. He is the grandson of former Chief Minister, Willard Wheatley. He has at times expressed a preference to be referred to by his adopted African name, Sowande Uhuru.

== Political career ==
Wheatley is from one of the main political families in the British Virgin Islands.

He first ran for election in the 2011 general election for the People's Patriotic Alliance (PPA) as an at-large candidate. He finished 10th in the voting with 798 votes (2.3%). He subsequently ran in the 2015 general election for the People's Empowerment Party (PEP), also as an at large candidate. He finished 11th in the voting with 470 votes (1.3%). He then ran in the 2019 general election for the Virgin Islands Party for the seventh district, and was elected after defeating incumbent Kedrick Pickering with 44.76% of the vote.

He was appointed Minister for Education, Culture, Youth Affairs, Fisheries and Agriculture from 2019. He was the acting Premier during the arrest of Andrew Fahie in April 2022 on drug trafficking and money laundering charges in Miami, United States. A Commission of Inquiry into corruption in the British Virgin Islands found that there were "appalling" failures in the islands' governance and a "high likelihood" of serious corruption, with the inquiry recommending the partial suspension of the islands’ constitution and the imposition of direct British rule of the islands for up to two years. He opposes direct rule from London during the crisis. On 5 May 2022, he brought a motion of no confidence against his own government for the removal of Andrew Fahie as Premier. The motion was passed unanimously. Wheatley was sworn in as Premier on the same day.

In February 2025, Wheatley found himself at the center of a growing trade dispute with the U.S. Virgin Islands over substantial fee hikes on USVI-based charter boats operating in BVI waters. The proposed increases, which would raise annual fees by thousands of percent, have sparked backlash from USVI officials, with Governor Albert Bryan Jr. threatening retaliatory tariffs and suggesting he may seek support from U.S. President Donald Trump. Wheatley has rejected these threats, stating that the BVI “will not be bullied” and emphasizing the need for fair economic contributions from foreign charter operators.

== Electoral history ==
Year	District	Party	Votes	Percentage	Winning/losing margin	Result
2011	At-large	People's Patriotic Alliance	798	2.3%	-3,424	Lost
2015	At-large	People's Empowerment Party	470	1.3%	-4,160	Lost
2019	7th District	Virgin Islands Party	384	44.8%	+46	Won
2023	7th District	Virgin Islands Party	487	57.0%	+120	Won

Political offices
Preceded by Kedrick Pickering	House of Assembly Member, 7th District; 2019–present	Incumbent
Preceded by Andrew Fahie	Premier of the British Virgin Islands; 2022–present	Incumbent
