= 2017 in the British Virgin Islands =

- Decades
- See also: Other events of 2017; Timeline of BVI history

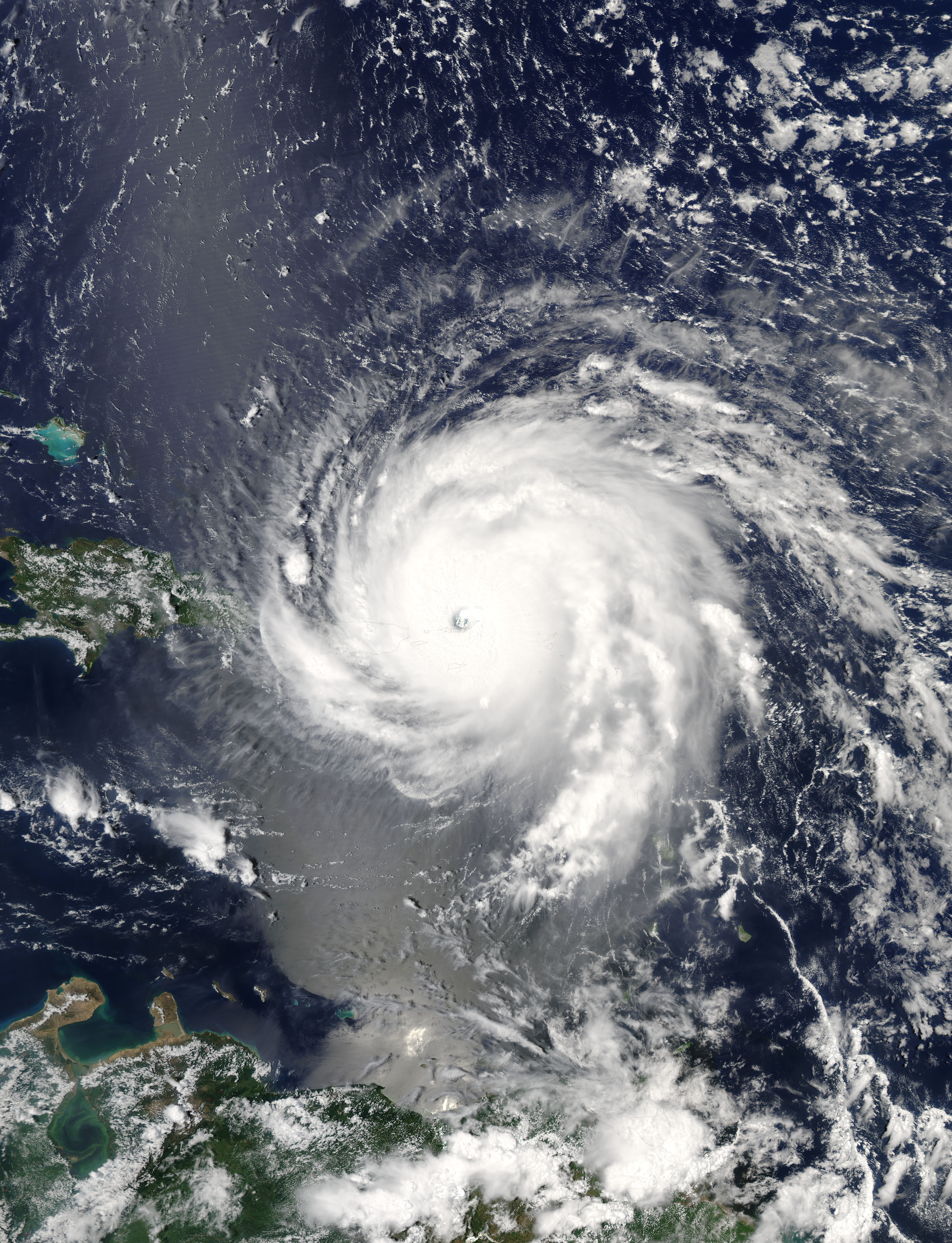
Hurricane Irma struck the British Virgin Islands with devastating effect on 6 September 2017, one of two Category-5 hurricanes to strike within a fortnight.

Events from the year 2017 in the British Virgin Islands.

== Incumbents ==
- Governor:
  - until 8 August: John Duncan
  - 8 August - 12 August: Robert Mathavious (acting)
  - 12 August - 22 August: Rosalie Adams (acting)
  - starting 22 August: Augustus Jaspert
- Premier: Orlando Smith

== Events ==
=== January ===
- 9 January 2017 - Bishop John Cline resigns from the BVI Health Services Authority after criticising the Government.
- 11 January 2017 - Social Security Board signs a contract to build 43 homes as part of a social housing project, the Territory's first.
- 23 January 2017
  - Former US President Barack Obama visits the British Virgin Islands.
  - BVI Finance appoints a new board of director from the private sector, transitioning from a publicly run body.

=== February ===
- 6 February 2017 - Andrew Fahie replaces Julian Fraser as leader of the opposition Virgin Islands Party.
- 8 February 2017 - Earl ‘Bob’ Hodge and Robert ‘Tico’ Harrigan are remanded into custody in relation to a long-standing extradition request from the United States.

=== March ===
- 3 March 2017 - Minister of Health, Ronnie Skelton, calls for the decriminalisation of marijuana.

=== April ===
- 1 April 2017 - retirement age is increased from 60 to 65.
- 25 April 2017 - UNICEF publishes a controversial report on the state of the British Virgin Islands.

=== May ===
- 3 May 2017 - new British Virgin Islands Electricity Corporation power plant comes online.
- 8 May 2017 - the Territory records its fifth murder, the highest total since 2008 and second highest ever.

=== July ===
- 1 July 2017 - registers of beneficial ownership are introduced for British Virgin Islands companies.
- 18 July 2017 - BVI Airways announced it was laying off all staff as it had exhausted its funds, despite having received a $7 million Government subsidy. This followed tit-for-tat accusations between the Government and the airline.

=== August ===
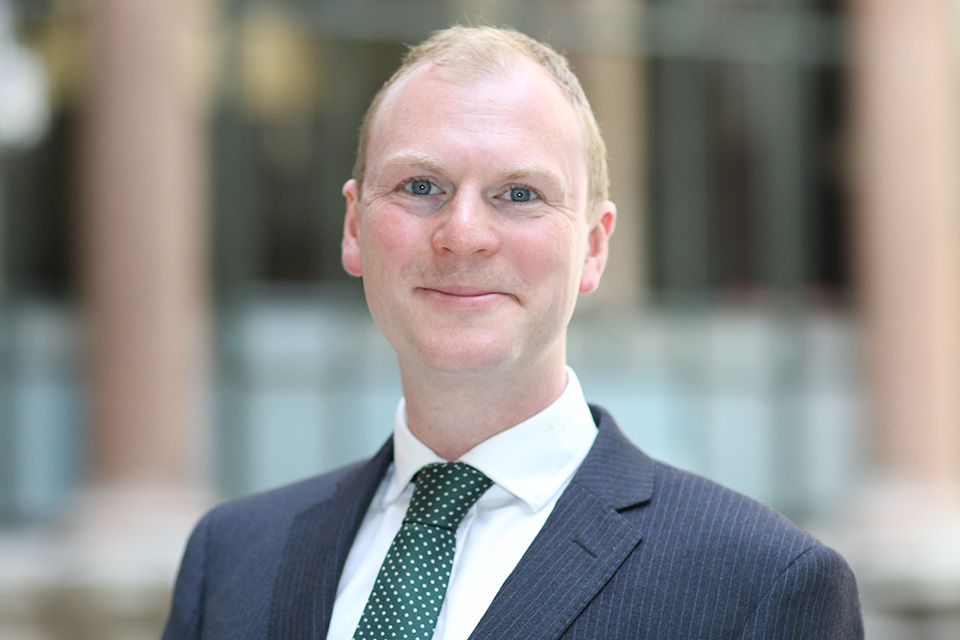
Gus Jaspert was sworn in as the BVI's new Governor.

- 8 August 2017 - Emancipation Festival celebrations are cancelled after flooding damage caused by torrential rains, the first cancellation due to weather in decades.
- 17 August 2017 - contrary to expectations, the Financial Services Commission announces an increase in incorporation rates since the introduction of beneficial ownership registration.
- 22 August 2017 - Augustus "Gus" Jaspert is sworn in as the new Governor of the Virgin Islands.

=== September ===
- 6 September 2017 - Hurricane Irma strikes the British Virgin Islands directly causing widespread damage and 4 deaths.
- 7 September 2017 - Governor declares state of emergency under the Constitution of the British Virgin Islands, the first time this has ever happened.
- 20 September 2017 - Hurricane Maria strikes the British Virgin Islands obliquely, causing modest damage. Damage caused by the Hurricane to nearby Puerto Rico affects recovery efforts following Hurricane Irma.
- 27 September 2017 - A number of high-risk inmates are transferred from Tortola to Bordelais Correctional Facility in St Lucia because of the damaged state of the Balsam Ghut prison.

=== November ===
- 14 November 2017 - At the third attempt the US government secures a ruling to extradite Earl 'Bob' Hodge and Roberto 'Tico' Harrigan to the US to face drugs charges. The initial extradition request was made in 2012.
- 22 November 2017 - a double homicide brings the country's tally of murders for the year to 10, the highest total ever in a single calendar year.

=== December ===
- 19 December 2017 - The Social Security board acquires a 33% shareholding in National Bank of the Virgin Islands. The bank was formerly wholly owned by the Government of the Virgin Islands.

== Deaths ==
- 20 December - Omar Hodge, politician.
