= 2016 in the British Virgin Islands =

- Decades
- See also: Other events of 2016; Timeline of BVI history

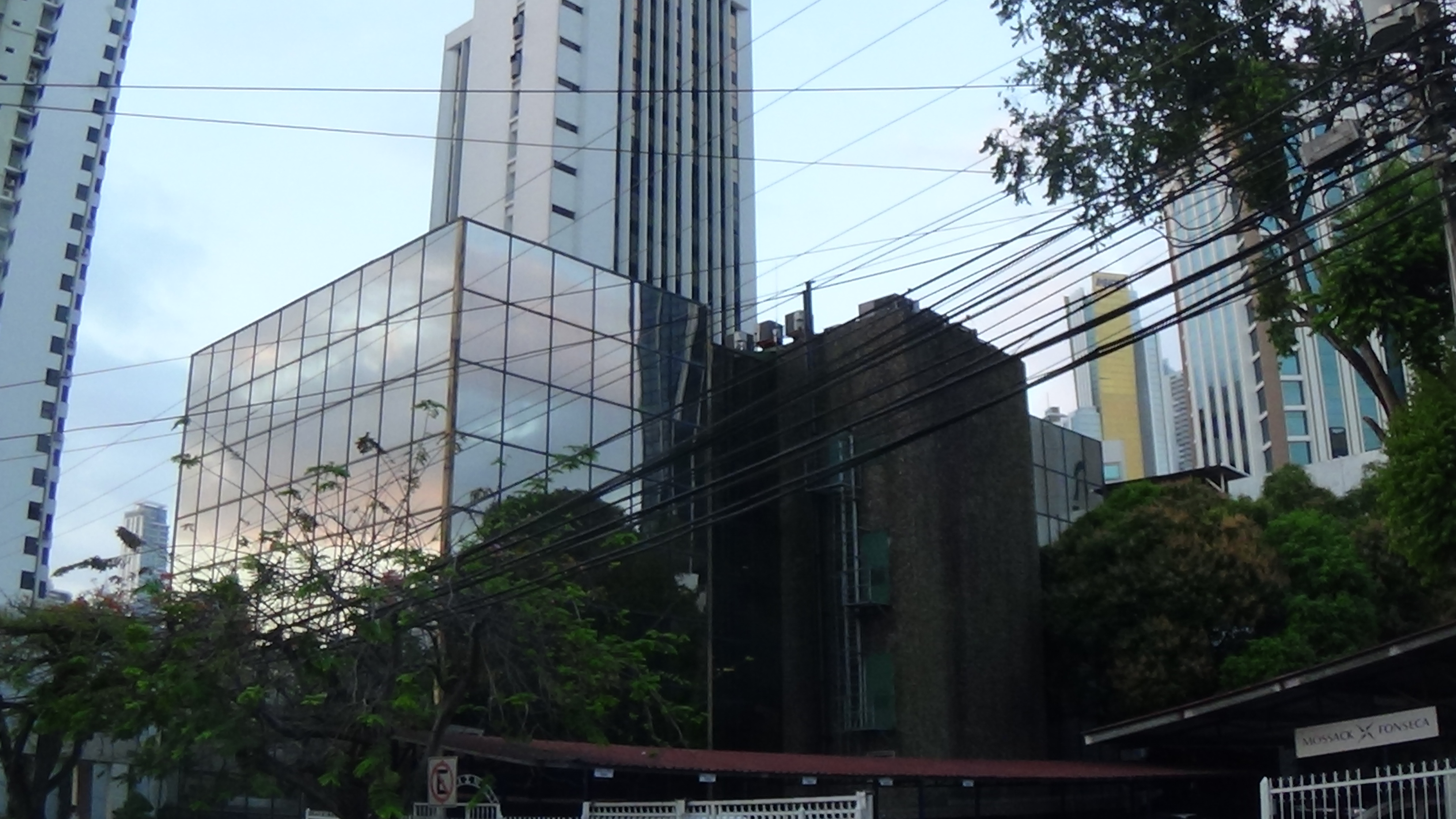
Mossack Fonseca, the company at the centre of the 2016 Panama Papers leak.

Events from the year 2016 in the British Virgin Islands.

== Incumbents ==
- Governor: John Duncan
- Premier: Orlando Smith

== Events ==
=== January ===
- 1 January 2016 - The National Health Insurance scheme comes into effect.
- 12 January 2016 - Government announces a controversial $7 million investment in startup BVI Airways.
- 20 January 2016 - The inaugural Virgin Islands General Legal Council is appointed, headed by Dancia Penn QC.
- 25 January 2016 - Minister of Works Mark Vanterpool announces that the public pier park project was cost $85 million, more than double the original budget of $35 million.

=== March ===
- 19 March 2016 - The BVI is affected by a magnitude 6.0 earthquake. No major damage is reported.

=== April ===
- 3 April 2016 - The Panama Papers are published, revealing the previously confidential beneficial owners of a large number of companies incorporated in the Territory.

=== June ===
- 23 June 2016 - The House of Assembly adopts the Virgin Islands pledge.

=== July ===
- 22 July 2016 - It is announced that Elinah Phillip will represent the British Virgin Islands at the 2016 Summer Olympics, the first time a swimmer has represented the Territory at the games.
- 31 July 2016 - Gunfire was shot at or near to the Premier's vehicle; the Premier, Orlando Smith, was not in the vehicle at the time.

=== August ===
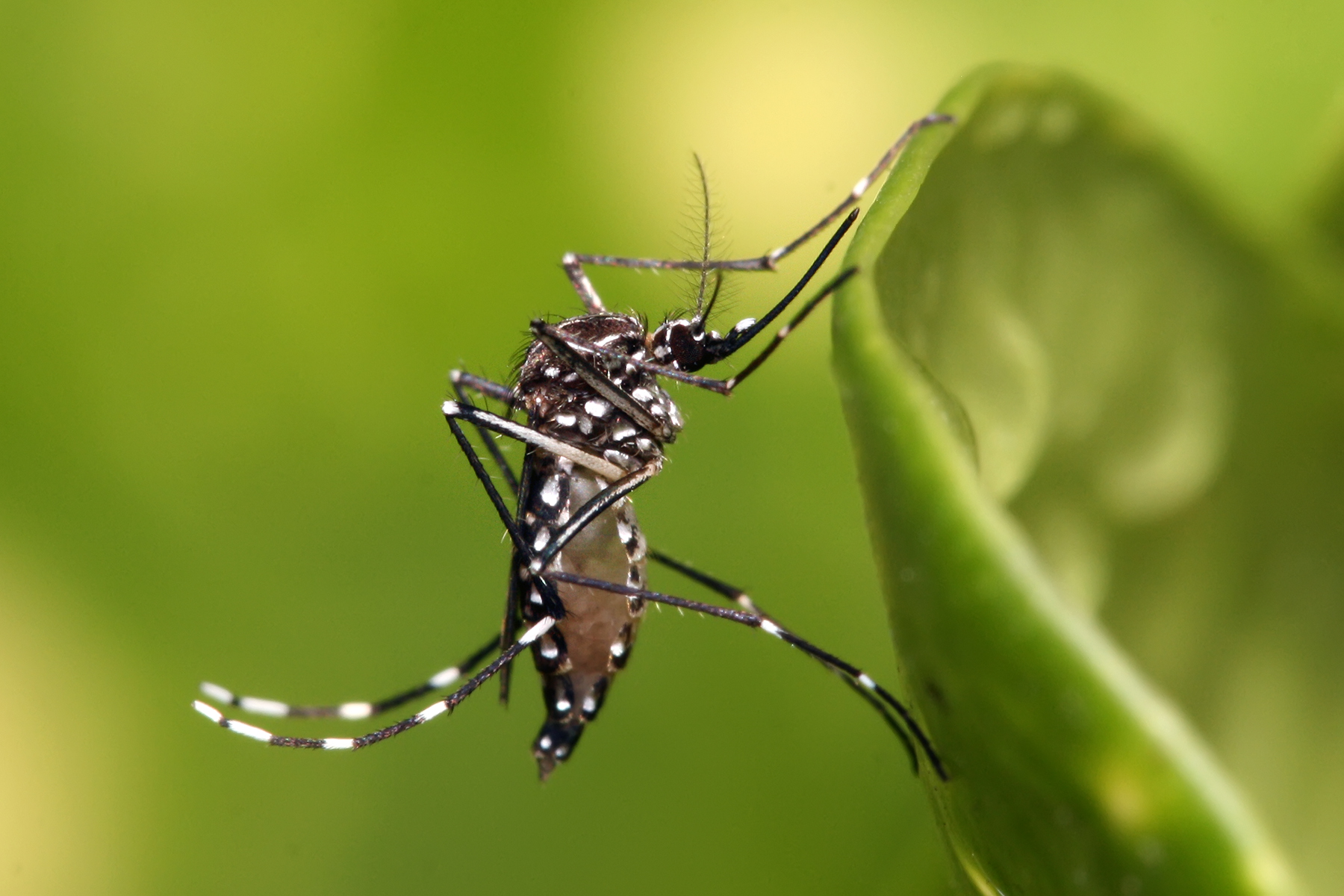
In August the 2015–16 Zika virus epidemic first affected the BVI.

- 22 August 2016 - Billionaire BVI resident Sir Richard Branson is injured in a serious cycling accident on Virgin Gorda.
- 25 August 2016 - Five cases of the Zika virus are confirmed in the Territory as part of a wider global outbreak.

=== September ===
- 29 September 2016 - Former Premier Ralph O'Neal suffers a stroke.

=== October ===
- 1 October 2016 - The minimum wage raised from $4 an hour to $6 an hour.
- 17 October 2016 - The Judicial Committee of the Privy Council rules against HM Customs in a long running dispute with Delta Petroleum.

=== November ===
- 28 November 2016 - The National Health Insurance scheme suspends benefits for over 1,000 workers because of their employer's failure to pay contributions. This action is subsequently agreed to be unlawful.

=== December ===
- 27 December 2016 - Government awards the contract for the expansion of Terrance B. Lettsome International Airport to China Communications Construction Company for US$153,432,572.10. It is the largest government contract awarded in the Territory's history, and concerns are expressed about the company's bidding practices.
