= 2018 in the British Virgin Islands =

- Decades
- See also: Other events of 2018; Timeline of BVI history

Events from the year 2018 in the British Virgin Islands.

== Incumbents ==
- Governor: Augustus Jaspert
- Premier: Orlando Smith

== Events ==
=== January ===
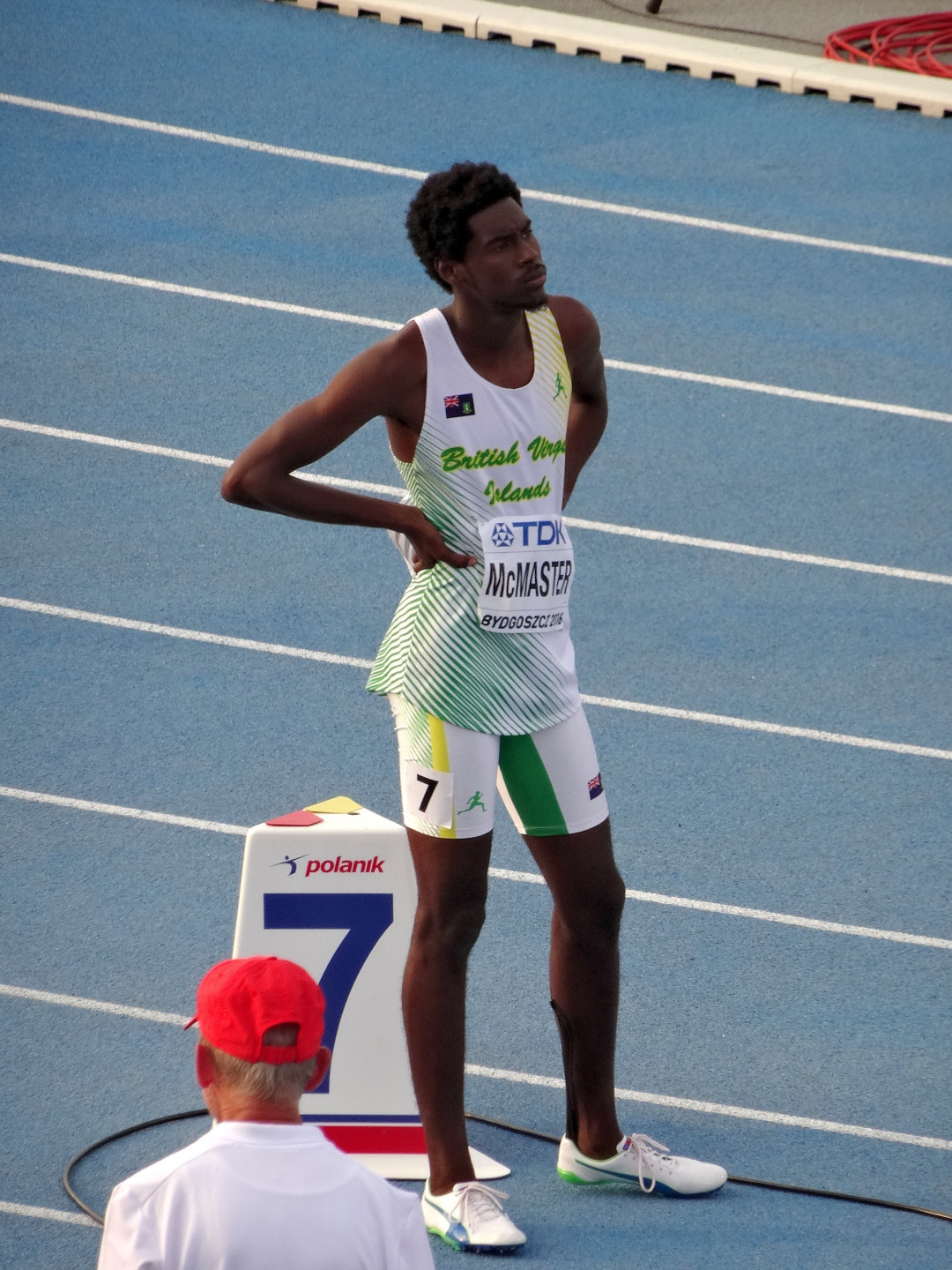
Kyron McMaster at the 2018 Commonwealth Games.

- 16 January - the opposition Virgin Islands Party states in a press conference that former leader, Julian Fraser, would not be named as a candidate for the party in the next general election.
- 18 January - Government announces proposals for the Terrance B. Lettsome International Airport to be privatised for a period of 20 years as part of a wider redevelopment under a Public–private partnership.

=== February ===
- 10 February 2018 - two people are gunned down in a double murder, the Territory's first of the year.
- 19 February 2018 - Deputy Premier Kedrick Pickering announces the Government is actively considering legalising medical marijuana.
- 17–28 February 2018 - a rapid succession of shooting incidents occur in Tortola, including one fatality.

=== March ===
- 1 March 2018 - David Archer succeeds Rosalie Adams as Deputy Governor.
- 28 March 2018 - After a threatened "backbencher revolt", the House of Assembly passes the Virgin Islands Recovery and Development Agency Bill, paving the way for £300 million in loan guarantees from the United Kingdom to assist rebuilding after Hurricane Irma.

=== April ===
- 6 April 2018 - A 5.2 magnitude earthquake hits the Territory. No damage or injuries are reported.
- 12 April 2018 - Kyron McMaster wins the gold medal in the 400m hurdles at the 2018 Commonwealth Games, the Territory's first ever medal at the games. This followed the death of his longtime coach, Dag Samuels, late the previous year during Hurricane Irma.

=== May ===
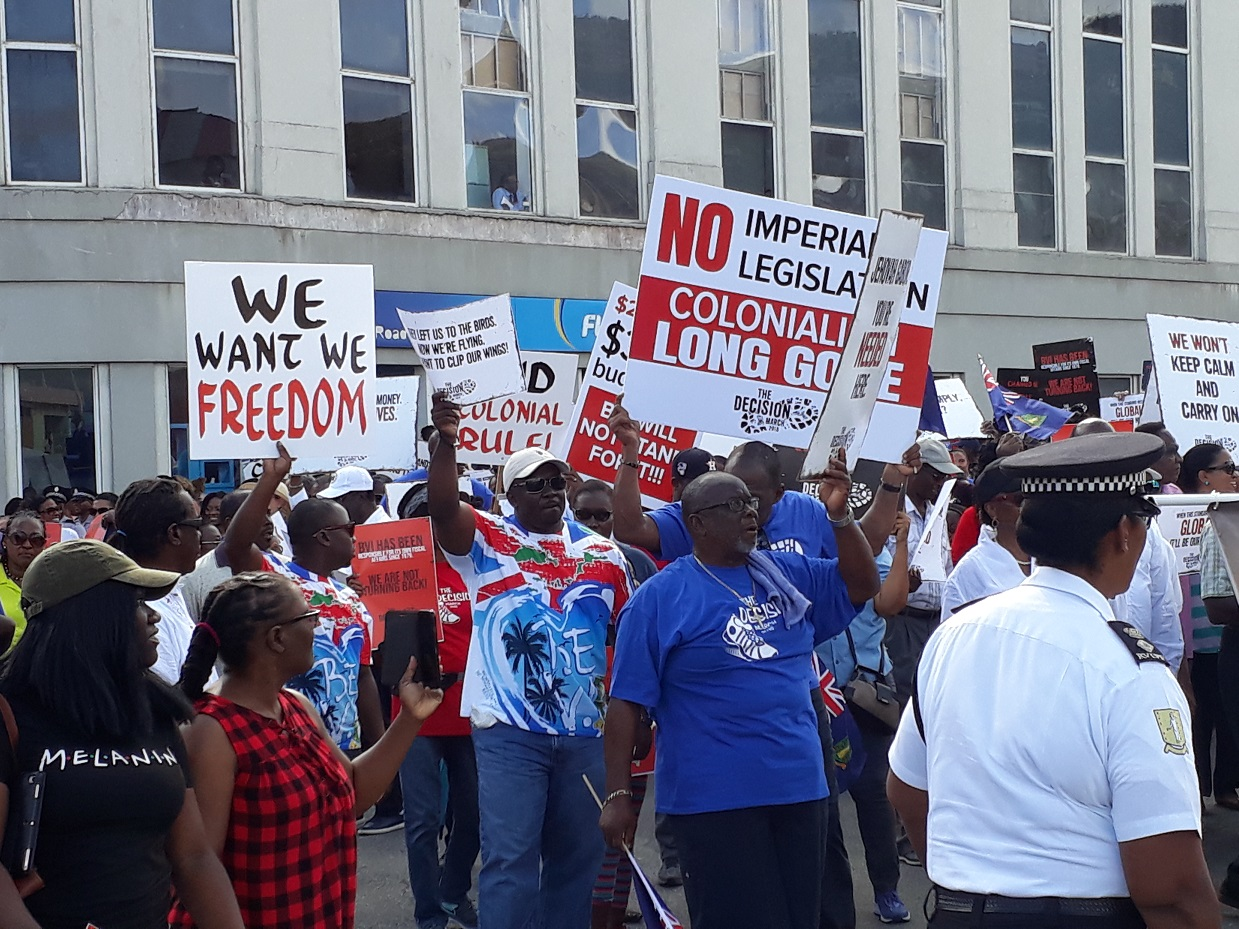
Protesters at the "Decision March".

- 1 May 2018 - The United Kingdom House of Commons votes in favour of an amendment to the Sanctions and Anti-money Laundering Act 2018 mandating public registers of beneficial ownership in all British Overseas Territories by 31 December 2020.
- 24 May 2018 - A public rally - the "Decision March" - protests against the British Parliament's decision to unilaterally impose legislative changes on the Territory. Opposition leader Andrew Fahie called for an immediate constitutional review, and Deputy Premier Kedrick Pickering referred to "entering a divorce" with the United Kingdom.
- 25 May 2018 - The immigration department announces that the population of the Territory has dropped by approximately 11% since Hurricanes Irma and Maria struck the previous year.
- 30 May 2018 - The Territory is plagued by Sargassum blooms.

=== June ===
- 8 June 2018 - A march organised to protest against the incumbent Government attracts fewer than 50 demonstrators.
- 19 June 2018 - Premier Orlando Smith announces he will be stepping down.
- 23 June 2018 - Myron Walwyn is elected as the new President of the governing National Democratic Party, although Orlando Smith remains Premier.
- 25 June 2018 - A 3.6 magnitude earthquake hits the Territory. No damage or injuries are reported.
- 29 June 2018 - A judge rejects the extradition of Bob Hodge and Tico Harrigan, overturning a previous ruling. The extradition proceedings have now been ongoing for nearly a decade.

=== July ===
- 18 July 2018 - One person is killed in a plane crash taking off from Beef Island airport.
- 20 July 2018 - A House of Commons Foreign Affairs Select Committee announces an inquiry on the future relationship of the United Kingdom with the British Overseas Territories, including the British Virgin Islands.

=== August ===
- 10 August 2018 - A man is gunned down in Purcell Estate, the Territory's fourth murder of the year.
- 19 August 2018 - A 3.2 magnitude earthquake is felt in the Territory, the third minor earthquake in the past five months. No damage or injuries ar reported.
- 24 August 2018 - House of Assembly member Julian Fraser launches a new political party, the Progressives United.

=== September ===
- 10 September 2018 - The Financial Services Commission publishes statistics for Q1 2018, which should a 12% jump in company incorporation rates.
- 12 September 2018 - A 4.3 magnitude earthquake is felt in the Territory, the fourth minor earthquake in the past six months. No damage or injuries ar reported.

=== October ===
- 11 October 2018 - The Royal Virgin Islands Police Force issued a report indicating that crime had fallen 23% over a 5-year period. The report also indicated that during 2017 (the year of Hurricane Irma), crime fell by 8% despite the widespread perception of a spike in criminal activity during that period.
- 22 October 2018 - Two people are murdered in separate, but possibly connected, incidents. They are the fifth and sixth murders in the Territory during the year.

=== November ===
- 3 November 2018 - Another minor earthquake affects the Territory, the fifth of the year.
- 19 November 2018 - Ronnie Skelton is fired as Minister for Health after stating proposals to form a rival party to the Government.
- 26 November 2018 - An explosion leads a massive fire at the Pockwood Pond incinerator.

=== December ===
- 7 December 2018 - A new party, the Progressive Virgin Islands Movement (PVIM) launches under the leadership of former Cabinet Minister, Ronnie Skelton.
- 22 December 2018 - Ronnie Skelton is officially appointed as the Leader of the Opposition, by virtue of leading an opposition party with three sitting members of the House of Assembly.

== Deaths ==
- 4 April 2018 - Elton Georges, long time Deputy Governor.
- 16 October 2018 - Delores Christopher, politician and member of the House of Assembly representing the 5th District.
