= 2019 in the British Virgin Islands =

- Decades
- See also: Other events of 2019; Timeline of BVI history

Events from the year 2019 in the British Virgin Islands.

== Incumbents ==
- Governor: Augustus Jaspert
- Premier:
  - Orlando Smith (until 25 February 2019)
  - Andrew Fahie (from 26 February 2019)

== Events ==
=== January ===
- 23 January - The House of Assembly is dissolved in anticipation of the 2019 general election, called for 25 February.

=== February ===
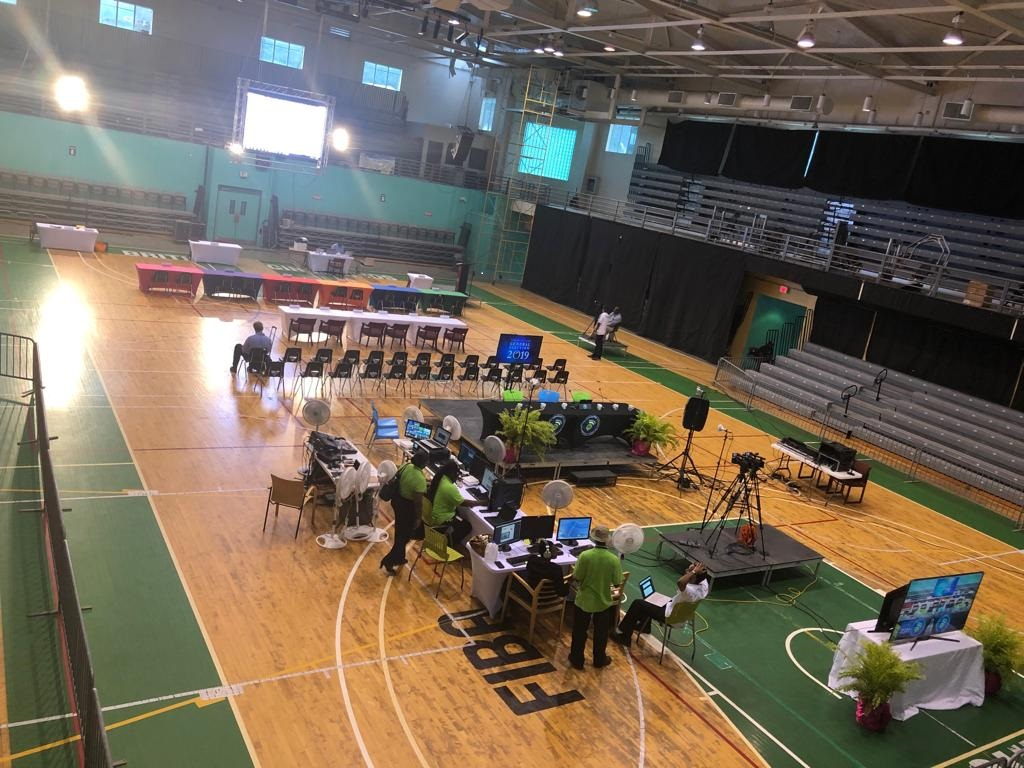
2019 general election.

- 3 February - The Territory records its first murder of the year.
- 25 February - The Virgin Islands Party wins the 2019 British Virgin Islands general election with 8 seats. A record seven first-time candidates (all VIP) won. Andrew Fahie was appointed premier.
- 28 February - Marlon Penn is sworn in as Leader of the Opposition following the surprise defeat of party leader, Myron Walwyn.

=== March ===
- 5 March - Former Cabinet Minister Mark Vanterpool abruptly resigns from politics just eight days after winning his seat in the 2019 general election.
- 14 March - Former Cabinet Minister Mark Vanterpool withdraws his resignation and alleges it was legally invalid. A dispute arises with the Speaker of the House as to whether the seat is vacant or not.

=== April ===
- 24 April - Controversy arises in relation to a non-tender US$98,000 six month consultancy contract awarded by the new Government to Claude Skelton-Cline, a media personality who endorsed the party. Contracts under US$100,000 are not required to be tendered under local law.
- 25 April - Premier Andrew Fahie indicates he has received death threats, and has retained bodyguards.

=== May ===
- 2 May
  - Mark Vanterpool is successful in his court action validating his claim to still be entitled to take up his seat in the House of Assembly despite attempting to resign before being sworn in.
  - Controversy arises in relation to a non-tendered purchase of a $115,000 vehicle for the use of the premier.

=== August ===
- 28 August - The Territory is struck lightly by Hurricane Dorian. No deaths or serious injuries are reported.

=== September ===
- 5 September - The exemption from requiring a work permit in favour of students is repealed.
- 13 September - Phase 1 of the new territorial system for addresses is rolled out.

=== November ===
- 11 November - Former chief minister and premier Ralph T. O'Neal dies.
- 14 November - In the 'speech from the Throne' Governor Augustus Jaspert indicates that the Government proposes to legalise and regulate gambling.
- 15 November - Government announces it is passing laws to permit the growing of medical marijuana.
- 20 November - Premier Andrew Fahie announced that the National Health Insurance scheme was to be restructured because "the current scheme is unsustainable and is in threat of failure".

== Deaths ==
- 11 November - Ralph T. O'Neal, former premier
