= 2014 in the British Virgin Islands =

- Decades
- See also: Other events of 2014; Timeline of BVI history

Events from the year 2014 in the British Virgin Islands.

== Incumbents ==
- Governor:
  - until August 1: William Boyd McCleary
  - August 1-August 15: V. Inez Archibald (acting)
  - starting August 15: John Duncan
- Premier: Orlando Smith

== Events ==
=== January ===
- 13 January 2014 - First cases of the 2013–14 chikungunya outbreak are confirmed in the British Virgin Islands.
- 17 January 2014 - Premier Orlando Smith promises Government will address the "harsh and brutal reality" of the Territory's $300 million unfunded public pension deficit.

=== March ===
- 29 March 2014 - The People's Empowerment Party, led by Alvin Christopher, is launched.

=== April ===
- 8 April 2014 - A major fire burns down a number of buildings in the capital, Road Town, during the early hours of the morning.

=== July ===
- 25 July 2014 - The Auditor General issues a highly critical report relating to a $6 million public greenhouse project. The greenhouses never produced any crops, and were eventually destroyed by Hurricane Irma.
- 29 July 2014 - The House of Assembly amends the Computer Misuse and Cybercrimes Bill after the Governor, Boyd McCleary, refuses to sign it, citing concerns over press freedom.

=== August ===
- 30 August 2014 - William "Kenny" Industrious dies at the age of 104. He is believed to be the oldest ever Virgin Islander.

=== October ===
- 7 October 2014 - Minister for Health, Ronnie Skelton, flies overseas for medical treatment leading to criticism.
- 25 October 2014 - Former legislator Irene Penn-O'Neal is charged with gun possession alongside her children. She is later acquitted.
- 31 October 2014 - The law is amended so that legitimate and illegitimate children are to be treated equally.

=== November ===
- 17 November 2014 - The 2010 BVI Census is finally published, nearly five years after it is conducted. The Territory census is conducted every 10 years.

=== December ===
- 31 December 2014 - BVI Airways suspends scheduled services "temporarily".

== Deaths ==
- 3 April - J.S. Archibald, QC - former Crown Counsel (predecessor office to Attorney General).
