= Governor Duncan =

Governor Duncan may refer to:

- John Duncan (diplomat) (born 1958), Governor of the British Virgin Islands from 2014 to 2017
- Jonathan Duncan (Governor of Bombay) (1756–1811), Governor of Bombay from 1795 to 1811
