= 2015 in the British Virgin Islands =

- Decades
- See also: Other events of 2015; Timeline of BVI history

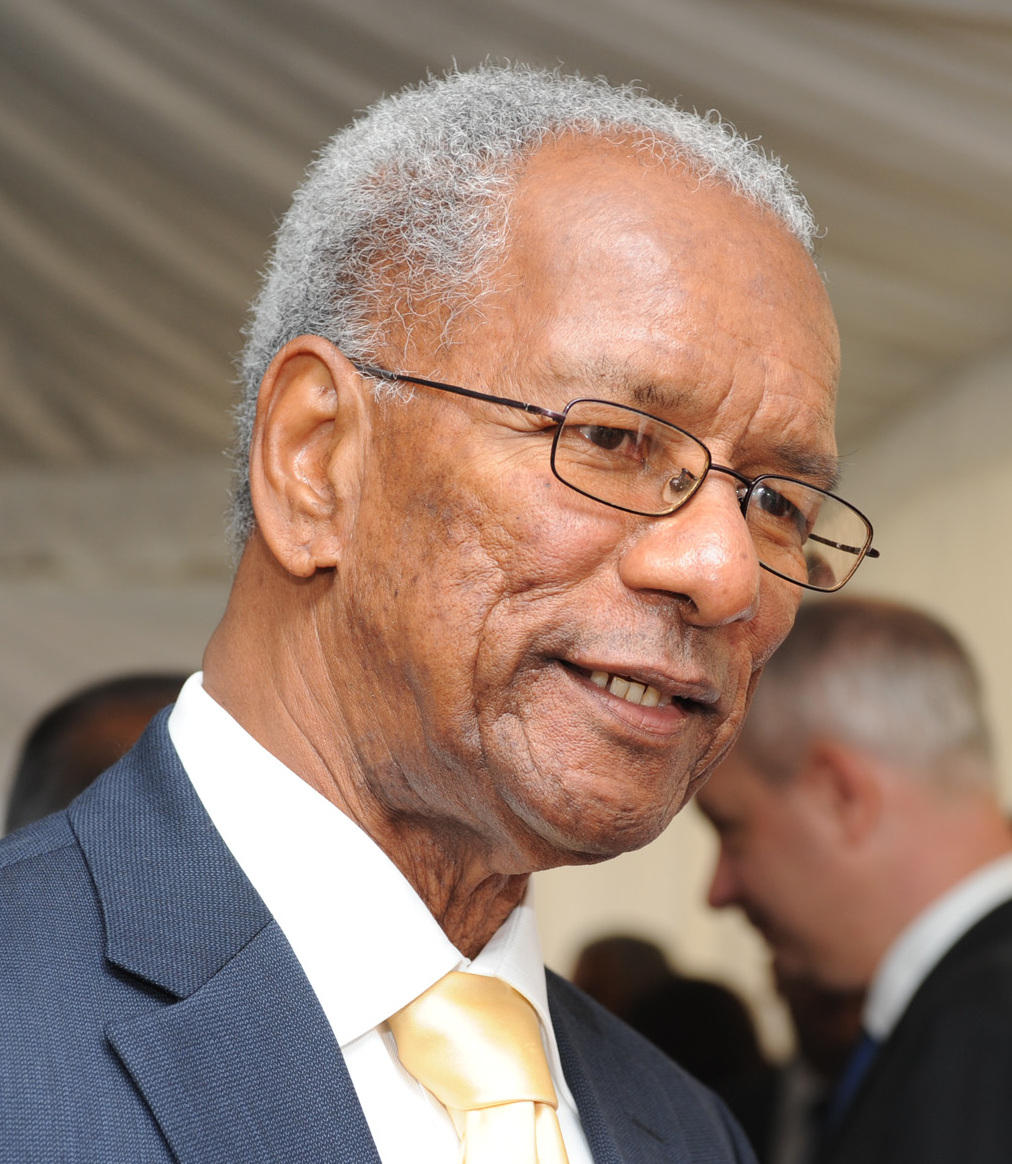
Orlando Smith won his third general election in 2015.

Events from the year 2015 in the British Virgin Islands.

== Incumbents ==
- Governor: John Duncan
- Premier: Orlando Smith

== Events ==
=== January ===
- 18 January 2015 - James Taylor, the oldest living resident in the Territory, dies at the age of 101.
- 29 January 2015 - Telecoms Regulatory Commission launches enquiry into poor broadband service in the Territory.

=== February ===
- 10 February 2015 - Baba Aziz is confirmed as Attorney General. He had previously held the post on an "acting" basis.

=== March ===
- 26 March 2015 - After years of delays, the Legal Professions Act 2015 is passed into law.

=== April ===
- 28 April 2015 - The new cruise ship pier park is officially opened, even though it has not actually been completed.

=== June ===
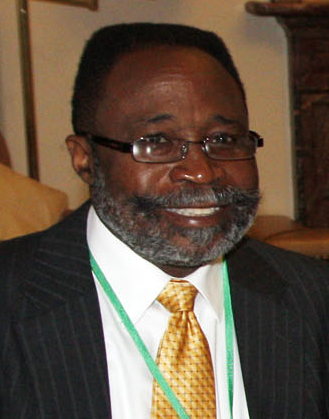
Julian Fraser.

- 8 June 2015 - The ruling National Democratic Party cruises to victory in a snap general election, increasing its overall majority. Orlando Smith remains Premier. A post-election report released afterwards by the Election Observer Mission to the Virgin Islands stated that voters described the 2015 campaign as the most negative they had ever witnessed.

=== July ===
- 16 July 2015 - Premier Orlando Smith, whilst affirming his traditional beliefs in marriage, indicates he is open to public consultation on gay marriage.
- 21 July 2015 - After a month long political impasse, Governor John Duncan determines that Julian Fraser should be appointed Lead of the Opposition.

=== August ===
- 24 August 2015 - The Telecom Regulatory Commission confirmed that it had received and rejected an application to block WhatsApp and other VOIP software.

=== October ===
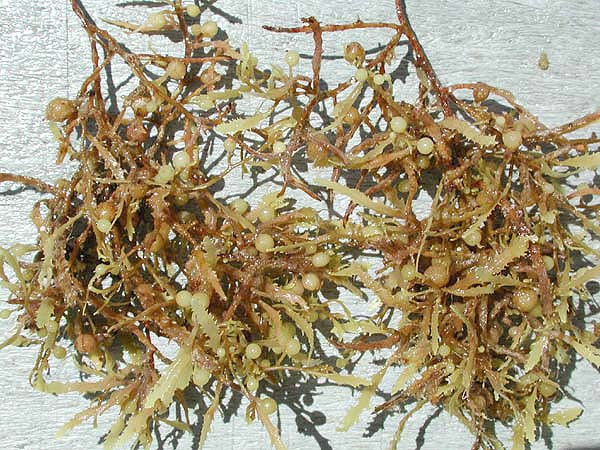
The BVI was affected by the 2015 Sargassum crisis in the Caribbean Sea.

- 2 October 2015 - Fisheries Department confirms that the months-long invasion of Sargassum weed is responsible for widespread fish deaths in the Territory.
