= Meteorological history of Hurricane Irma =

Hurricane Irma
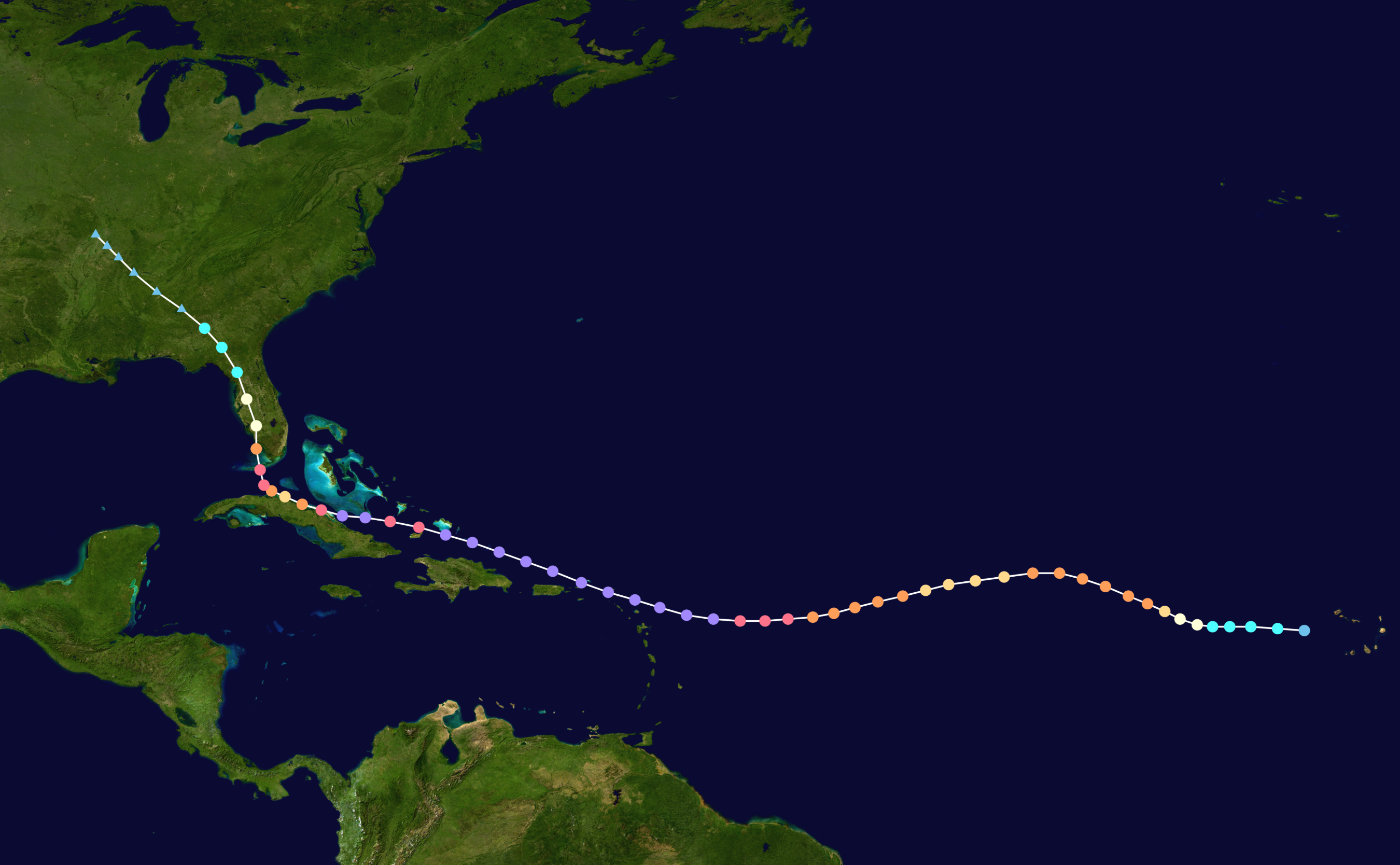
- Track of Hurricane Irma

Meteorological history
- Formed: August 30, 2017
- Extratropical: September 12, 2017
- Dissipated: September 13, 2017

Category 5 major hurricane
- 1-minute sustained (SSHWS/NWS)
- Highest winds: 180 mph (285 km/h)
- Lowest pressure: 914 mbar (hPa); 26.99 inHg

Overall effects
- Areas affected: Cape Verde; Leeward Islands; Greater Antilles; Lucayan Archipelago; Eastern United States
- Part of the 2017 Atlantic hurricane season
- History: Meteorological history; Effects: Lesser Antilles; Florida; Other wikis: Commons: Irma images

Hurricane Irma was an extremely powerful Cape Verde hurricane that caused extensive damage in the Caribbean and Florida. Lasting from late August to mid-September 2017, the storm was the strongest open-Atlantic tropical cyclone on record and the first Category 5 hurricane to strike the Leeward Islands. Classified as the ninth named storm, fourth hurricane, and second major hurricane of the hyperactive 2017 Atlantic hurricane season, Irma developed from a tropical wave near the Cape Verde Islands on August 30. Favorable conditions allowed the cyclone to become a hurricane on the following day and then rapidly intensify into a major hurricane by September 1 as it moved generally westward across the Atlantic. However, dry air and eyewall replacement cycles disrupted further strengthening, with fluctuations in intensity during the next few days. Irma resumed deepening upon encountering warmer sea surface temperatures, while approaching the Lesser Antilles on September 4. The system reached Category 5 intensity on the following day and peaked with winds of 180 mph (290 km/h) shortly thereafter.

Irma made its first landfall on Barbuda early on September 6 at peak intensity. The hurricane also struck Saint Martin and Virgin Gorda in the British Virgin Islands at Category 5 intensity later that day. Upon clearing the Leeward Islands, the cyclone continued west-northwestward toward the Bahamas. Around the time of landfall on Little Inagua Island early on September 8, Irma weakened to a Category 4 hurricane, after being a Category 5 hurricane for about 60 consecutive hours, the second longest contiguous time period as a Category 5 hurricane on record. Late on September 8, the storm re-intensified to Category 5 southwest of Ragged Island. Irma made landfall near Cayo Romano, Cuba, at that intensity, becoming the first Category 5 hurricane to strike the island since 1924. Although land interaction weakened Irma to a high-end Category 2 hurricane, the system re-intensified to Category 4 status as it crossed the warm waters of the Straits of Florida, before making landfall on Cudjoe Key on September 10. Irma weakened to Category 3 status prior to another landfall in Florida on Marco Island later that day. The system degraded into a remnant low over Alabama, and ultimately dissipated on September 13 over Missouri.

Irma caused widespread devastation in the Caribbean, with a total of $27.16 billion (2017 USD) in damages and 27 deaths being attributed to the hurricane accumulative of all affected areas in the Caribbean. The hurricane was the second costliest to ever impact the state of Florida, with at least $50 billion in damages and 92 fatalities left behind by the storm. With damages totaling to $77.16 billion (2017 USD), Irma is the sixth-costliest tropical cyclone on record.

== Formation and initial rapid intensification ==
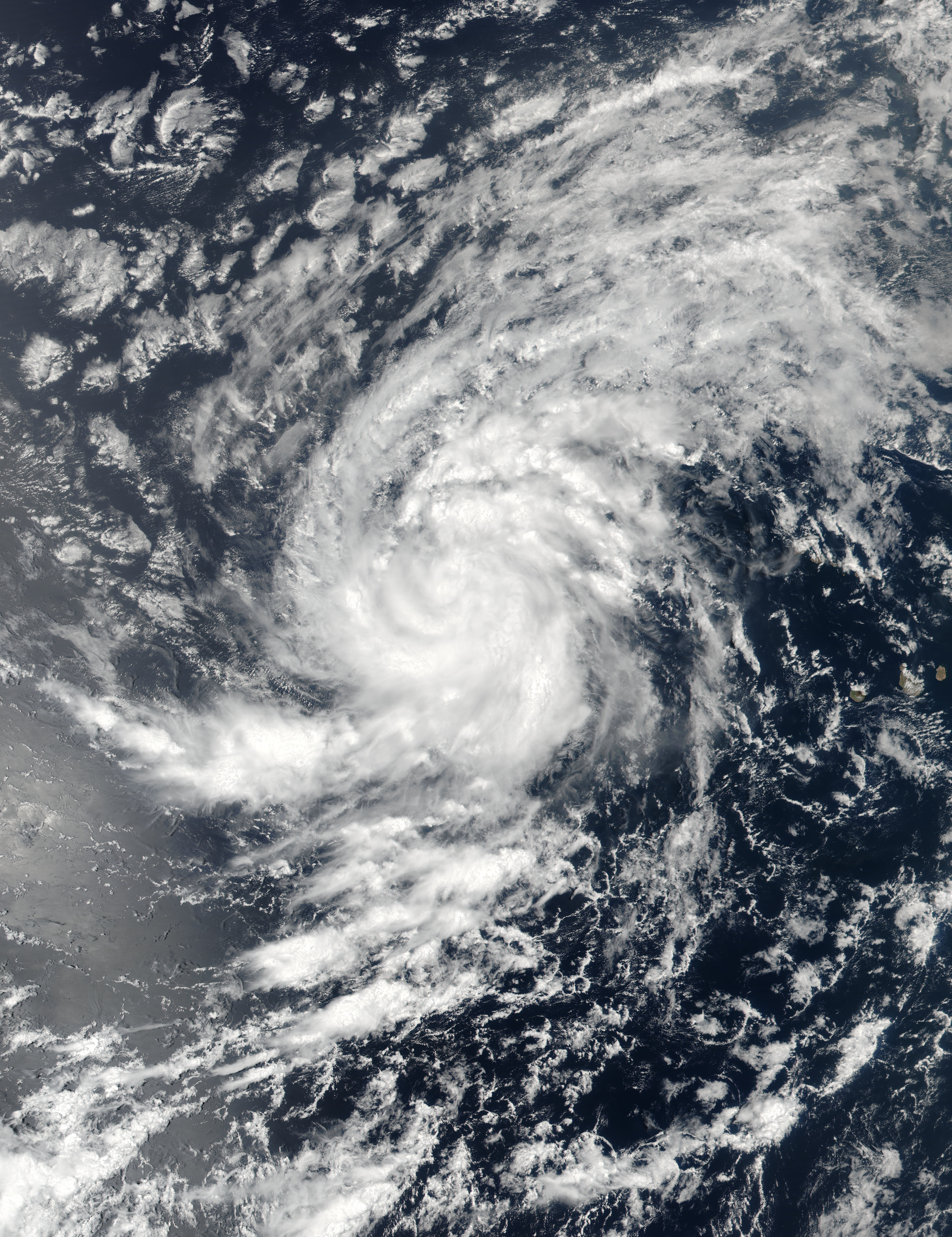
Tropical Storm Irma shortly after formation on August 30

The National Hurricane Center (NHC) began monitoring a tropical wave over western Africa on August 26. The tropical wave, which was producing a large area of deep convection, moved off the coast of the continent late on August 27. Throughout the next two days, showers and thunderstorms associated with the wave became better organized and gradually coalesced into a low-pressure area, as the system passed just south of and then through the Cape Verde Islands on August 29; the NHC stated that any significant organization of the disturbance would result in the classification of a tropical depression. With satellite imagery indicating that a well-defined circulation developed by early on August 30, it was estimated that the system developed into the tenth tropical depression of the season at 00:00 UTC while situated about 140 mi (230 km) west-southwest of São Vicente in the Cape Verde Islands. Shortly after forming, the banding features associated with the depression increased, and the depression intensified slightly, becoming Tropical Storm Irma at 06:00 UTC. The NHC operationally began advisories at 15:00 UTC that day, with cyclone already at tropical storm status, based on scatterometer data and satellite estimates. Strengthening was anticipated due to warm sea surface temperatures and low wind shear, and only slightly cooler waters and drier air were foreseen as a hindrance to intensification.

Moving westward due to a mid-level ridge over the eastern Atlantic, the nascent storm began developing upper-level poleward outflow, as an anticyclone became established over the system, with banding features becoming increasingly evident in satellite images. Early on August 31, a central dense overcast (CDO) and an eye feature developed, indicating that Irma intensified into a Category 1 hurricane around 06:00 UTC, only 30 hours after tropical cyclogenesis. The mid-level ridge to the north weakened slightly late on August 31, resulting in the storm curving west-northwestward. Irma underwent rapid intensification after reaching hurricane status, becoming a Category 2 hurricane at 18:00 UTC and then a Category 3 hurricane, becoming a major hurricane – around 00:00 UTC on September 1. In a 48-hour period, the hurricane's intensity had increased by 65 mph (105 km/h), a feat achieved only by about 1-in-30 Atlantic hurricanes. On September 2, a ship passed 60 mi (97 km) to the west of the center of Irma, recording maximum winds of 45 mph (72 km/h), while hurricane-force winds were estimated to have extended up to 17 mi (27 km) from the center, both of which indicated that the inner core of Irma remained compact. After being a major hurricane for about 30 hours, the system weakened slightly to a strong Category 2 hurricane at 12:00 UTC on September 2, likely as a result of drier air and eyewall replacement cycles, with the eye sometimes becoming obscured and the deep convection lining the eyewall appearing weaker. During this time, Irma began moving west-southwestward under the influence of a strong high pressure area to the north. The first aircraft reconnaissance flight into the hurricane occurred early on September 4; during the mission, an eye 29 mi (47 km) in diameter and surface winds of 115 mph (185 km/h) were observed. Although the NHC operationally considered Irma to be a Category 3 hurricane at that time, post-analysis indicated that the storm was still at Category 2 status.

== Peak intensity and the Caribbean islands ==
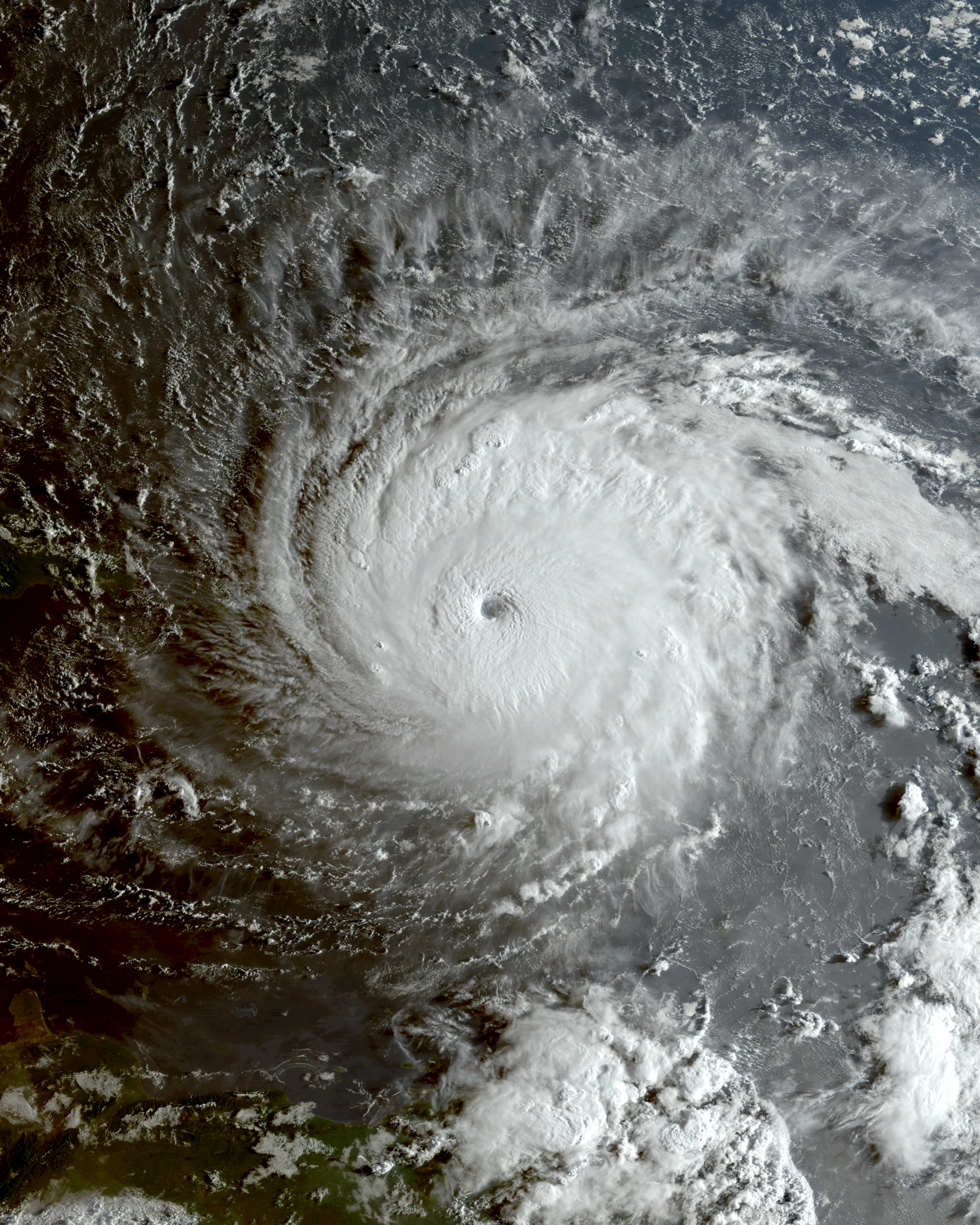
Hurricane Irma at peak intensity while making landfall in Saint Martin on September 6

Irma re-intensified into a Category 3 hurricane at 12:00 UTC on September 3 as it moved southwestwards under the influence of the ridge. Beginning early the following day, the eye began increasing in size and improving in appearance, while deep convection surrounding the eye became more symmetrical. Additionally, the hurricane headed into warmer sea surface temperatures as it approached the Leeward Islands. As a result, Irma underwent another period of rapid intensification, reaching Category 4 intensity at 18:00 UTC on September 4 and Category 5 status at 12:00 UTC on September 5. The extremely powerful hurricane grew in size and became increasingly symmetric, acquiring annular characteristics, with mesovortices being observed within the well-defined eye, signaling the continued intensification of the storm. Sustained winds peaked at 180 mph (290 km/h) near 18:00 UTC on September 5 – although it was operationally assessed at 185 mph (298 km/h). Early on September 6, the storm reached its minimum barometric pressure of 914 mbar (27.0 inHg) just before 06:00 UTC, an estimate based on a dropsonde surface pressure observation and measurements from Barbuda and Saint Barthélemy. This was the lowest barometric pressure in the Atlantic since Dean in 2007.

Irma made landfall along the northern coast of Barbuda around 05:45 UTC on September 6, at peak intensity; Irma maintained its peak until 12:00 UTC on September 6. After crossing the island of Barbuda, the hurricane, which maintained its intensity and impressive satellite appearance, struck Saint Martin at 11:15 UTC on September 6 and later Virgin Gorda at 16:30 UTC with winds of 180 mph (290 km/h), though Irma's pressure had risen slightly by the time of its third landfall in Virgin Gorda. As the hurricane moved away from the Virgin Islands late on September 6, observations from reconnaissance flights indicated that the cyclone weakened and had concentric eyewalls, while a Doppler radar in San Juan, Puerto Rico, also noted a double eyewall. However, Irma remained a Category 5 hurricane and the wind field expanded. Late on September 6, the cyclone passed about 60 mi (97 km) north of Puerto Rico. Moving west-northwestward, Irma closely paralleled the northern coast of Hispaniola throughout the day on September 7. By late that day however, an eyewall replacement cycle began to take place within the hurricane; reconnaissance aircraft found an elliptical eye later that day, though the wind field continued to expand. As a consequence of this internal structure change, Irma weakened to a Category 4 hurricane as it passed south of the Turks and Caicos Islands early on September 8. This subsequently ended the 60-hour contiguous period of Irma maintaining Category 5 intensity, the second longest any Atlantic storm had maintained winds above 156 mph (251 km/h) – only the 1932 Cuba hurricane had lasted for a longer consecutive time period at that intensity, at 78 hours.

== The Bahamas and Cuba ==
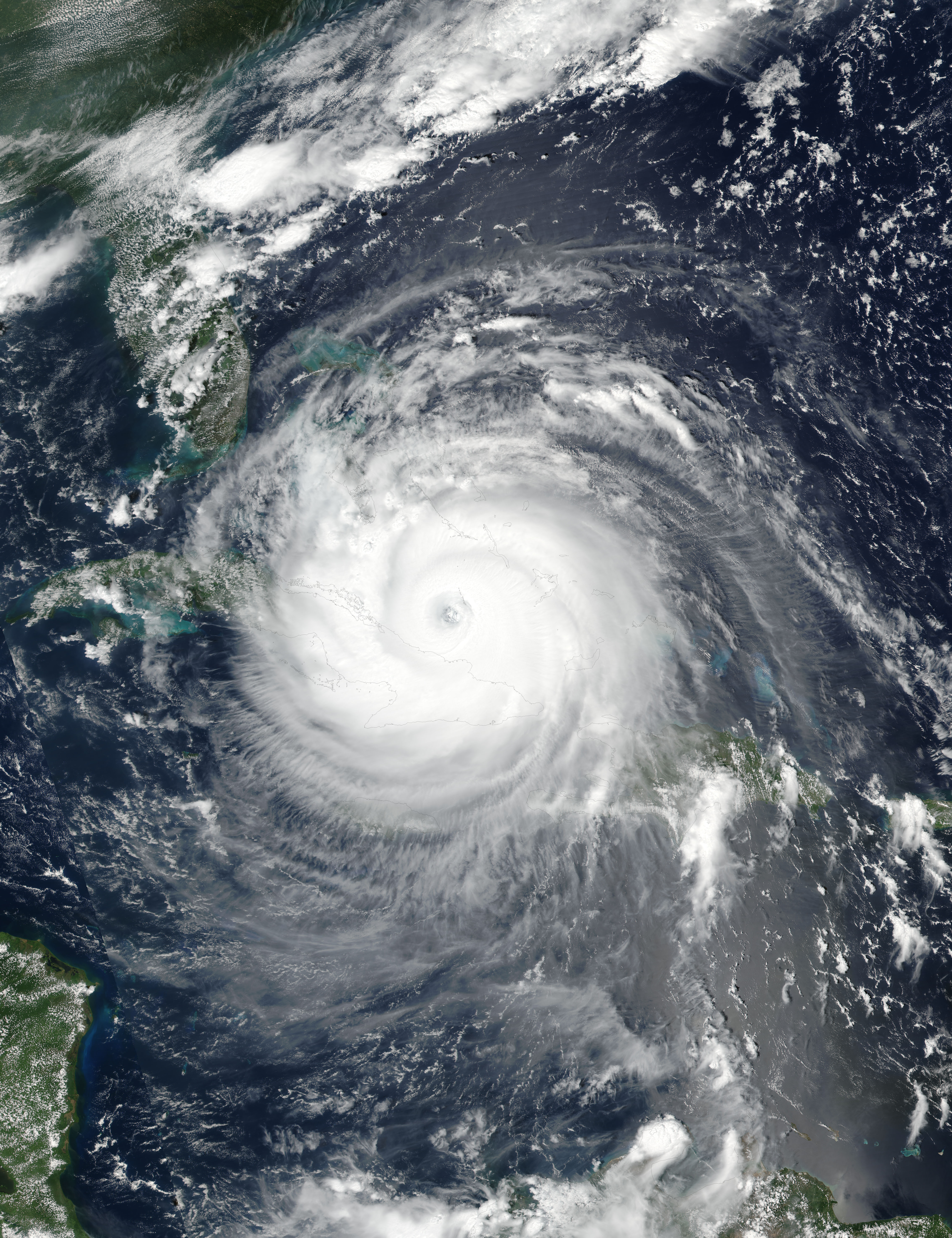
Hurricane Irma approaching Cuba late on September 8

At 05:00 UTC, early on September 8, the eye of Irma made landfall on the island of Little Inagua in the Bahamas, with winds of 155 mph (249 km/h) and a central pressure of 924 mbar (27.3 inHg). The hurricane then began tracking more to the west due to the intensification of a subtropical ridge to its north. Once the eyewall replacement cycle was completed, Irma began to re-intensify, and it re-attained Category 5 intensity at 18:00 UTC that day east of Cuba, as deep convection became more pronounced and organized. The hurricane then made landfall in Cayo Romano, Cuba, at 03:00 UTC on September 9, at Category 5 intensity, with winds of 165 mph (266 km/h) and a central pressure identical to its previous landfall. This made Irma only the second Category 5 hurricane to strike Cuba in recorded history, after the 1924 Cuba hurricane – both had identical wind speeds at landfall. As the eye of Irma moved along the northern coast of Cuba, gradual weakening ensued due to land interaction, with the eye becoming cloud-filled and the intensity falling to a high-end Category 2 later on September 9 – operationally, it had been assessed as never falling below 120 mph (190 km/h), though it was lowered in post-analysis, possibly due to shoaling interfering with reconnaissance data.

By later that night, the forward speed of Irma had begun to slow down, which allowed it to finally begin moving northwestward towards Florida in response to a complex steering pattern, which involved Irma moving around the southwestern edge of the subtropical high to its northeast and a low-pressure system that was located over the continental United States. Moving over the Florida Straits which contained sea surface temperatures of near 31 °C (88 °F), allowed Irma to quickly restrengthen, and re-attain Category 4 intensity at 06:00 UTC on September 10 while located about 65 mi (105 km) from Key West, Florida, as deep convection improved and the eye becoming better defined. By this time, the NHC anticipated Irma would maintain its intensity before making landfall in the state of Florida later that day. In addition, Irma's wind field continued to increase in size, with hurricane-force winds spanning out a region of 80 mi (130 km) and gale-force winds spanning 220 mi (350 km) in diameter.

== Florida landfalls and dissipation ==
Radar loop of Irma making landfall in the Florida Keys on September 10

Irma made landfall in Cudjoe Key, Florida at 13:00 UTC on September 10 at Category 4 intensity, with winds of 130 mph (210 km/h) and a central pressure of 931 mbar (27.5 inHg). This made Irma the first Category 4 hurricane to strike Florida since Hurricane Charley in 2004. In addition, Irma's landfall in the Florida Keys marked the first time on record two Category 4 hurricanes made landfall in the continental U.S. within the same season – with Hurricane Harvey having made landfall at roughly the same intensity in Texas just over two weeks prior. Increasing wind shear and land interaction caused the satellite appearance of the storm to become ragged later that day, and Irma weakened to Category 3 intensity before making its seventh and final landfall at 19:30 UTC in Marco Island, Florida, with winds of 115 mph (185 km/h) and a central pressure of 936 mbar (27.6 inHg).

Once Irma had moved inland, it began to accelerate to the north-northwest, while rapid weakening began to occur due to the increasing wind shear, land interaction, and dry air, with the storm falling below Category 3 intensity hours after landfall. Passing east of Tampa as a weakening Category 1 hurricane around 06:00 UTC on September 11, Irma continued to weaken as most of the deep convection became more spread out towards the northern semi-circle of the circulation – though it retained a large wind field, with most of Florida experiencing gale-force winds. Irma finally weakened to a tropical storm around 12:00 UTC that day as it entered southern Georgia and began its transition to a post-tropical cyclone. At 06:00 UTC on September 12, Irma degenerated to a remnant low just as it entered Alabama, as most of the deep convection had dissipated. The remnants persisted for another day or so before dissipating on September 13.

== See also ==
- Hurricane Irma
- Meteorological history of Hurricane Georges
- 2017 Atlantic hurricane season
- Timeline of the 2017 Atlantic hurricane season
