= Oh, Beautiful Virgin Islands =

Territorial anthem of the British Virgin Islands

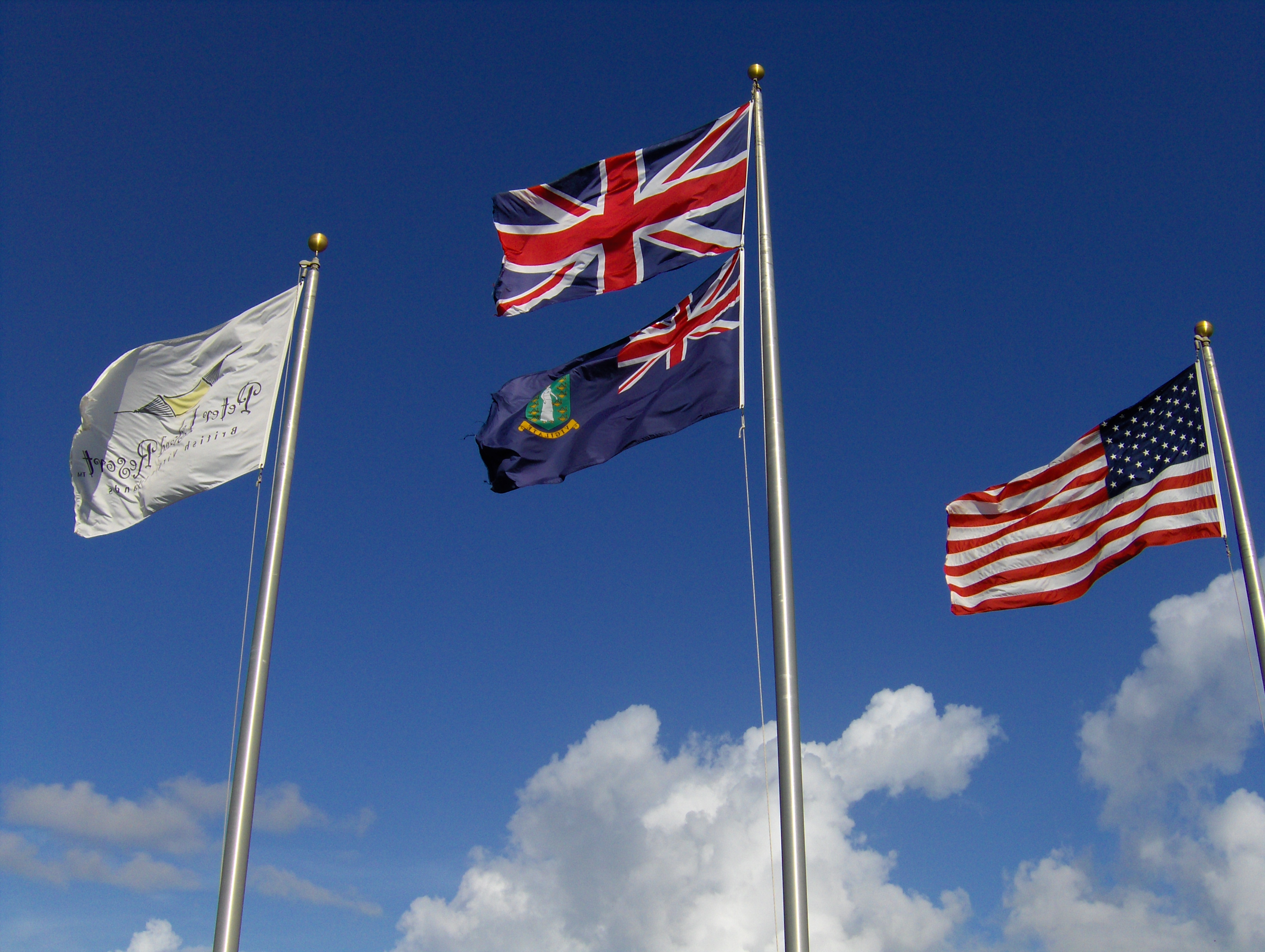
- From left-to-right: flag of Peter Island Resort and Spa, flag of the United Kingdom, flag of the British Virgin Islands, flag of the United States
- Territorial anthem of the British Virgin Islands
- Lyrics: Ayana Hull, 2012
- Music: Ayana Hull and Kareem-Nelson Hull, 2011
- Adopted: 2013

"Oh, Beautiful Virgin Islands" is the official territorial song of the British Virgin Islands (often called the BVI). The song was composed by brother and sister team Kareem Nelson Hull and Ayana Hull, both Virgin Islanders. It was adopted as the territorial song by resolution of the House of Assembly of the Virgin Islands on 24 July 2012. As a British Overseas Territory, the Virgin Islands retains "God Save the King" as its official national anthem.

== History ==
The Virgin Islands Minister for Education and Culture, Myron Walwyn, announced in December 2011 that the VI government would hold a "Territorial Song and Dress Competition". Walwyn explained that his government wished to adopt a "territorial song and dress that embodies who we are as a people" and that would "infuse Virgin Islands pride and provide a greater sense of identity". The minister acknowledged that the former government had begun a similar process in 2005. The minister added that the "new process will allow for entries from a wider base and give previous submissions the opportunity to redefine and submit their work".

Former culture minister, Ms. Eileene L. Parsons was chosen to spearhead the ad hoc Committee on Territorial Dress and Song. The other committee members were Mrs. Sheila Brathwaite, Dr. Charles Wheatley, Mrs. Delores Christopher and the acting director of culture, Mrs. Brenda Lettsome-Tye. Twenty-four submissions were received for the Territorial Song Competition. Ultimately, three songs were chosen as the finalists: "Virgin Islands, Land I Love", "Wonder of Creation: The Beautiful Virgin Islands" and the winning song. Members of the public were then invited to vote online for their preferred song.

An open presentation of the finalists for the Territorial Song and Dress Competition was hosted by the government on Sunday, 10 June 2012, at a celebration entitled "Defining Ourselves: A Virgin Islands Story in Dress and Song." The presentation was held at the Eileen L. Parsons Auditorium (named in honour of the Chairlady of the Territorial Song and Dress Committee) of the H. Lavity Stoutt Community College at 3pm. The Premier and the Culture Minister both delivered separate remarks at the Presentation. During the Presentation, the three finalist songs were performed.

Following a robust debate in the House of Assembly, the winning song received 10 votes out of a possible 13 votes from the elected members. Two Opposition members were absent while the former Culture Minister, the Hon. Andrew Fahie abstained based on the process that was being used. By that resolution (as rectified by the resolution below), the territorial song was chosen. The following is the text of the resolution (which also approved the official Territorial dress):

THE HOUSE OF ASSEMBLY OF THE VIRGIN ISLANDS

RESOLUTION NO. 18 OF 2012

[Gazetted 20th September, 2012]

WHEREAS on the 24th day of July, 2012, the House of Assembly of the Virgin Islands approved, by Resolution No. 12 of 2012, Oh, Beautiful Virgin Islands by Ayana Hull as the Territorial Song and collaborative design by Ms. Kristin Frazer and Mrs. Florence Phillips design, as the Territorial Dress;

AND WHEREAS on the 24th day of July, 2012 the House of Assembly by the said Resolution No. 12 of 2012 did recognise Ms. Ayana Hull as the composer/writer of Oh, Beautiful Virgin Islands instead of recognising Ms. Ayana Hull and Mr. Kareen Nelson Hull as having collaborated on the song.

NOW THEREFORE, BE IT RESOLVED that Oh, Beautiful Virgin Islands by Ayana Hull and Kareem Hull is the Territorial Song and the collaborative design by Ms. Kristin Frazer and Mrs. Florence Phillips, is the Territorial Dress.

Passed by the House of Assembly this 3rd day of September, 2012.

(Sgd.) Ingrid Moses-Scatliffe, Speaker.

(Sgd.) Phyllis Evans, Clerk of the House of Assembly.

=== Other symbols ===
The adoption of the territorial song was followed in 2016 by the adoption of a territorial pledge. The Virgin Islands pledge is now recited by school children in the territory on every school days. Its adoption was intended as another Government initiative aimed at instilling 'Virgin Islands pride'.

== Lyrics ==
I
Out of the huts of history’s pain
Our ancestors bled and died!
But with strength and willpower we overcame
To restore Virgin Islands pride!
To preserve our beauty we devised a plan
To obtain ownership of your precious lands!
Educating our people is the golden key
To maintain the success of this Territory!

Chorus:
Oh how radiant are your daughters!
And how wealthy are your sons!
Your beaches boast your beauty!
And your success is second to none!
Green and brilliant are your hillsides!
They replenish our hopes and pride!
Oh Beautiful Virgin Islands!
Your qualities can never be denied!

II
We shall protect your bountiful shores
And uphold your dignity!
We shall fight to preserve your culture
Your splendour and integrity!
And we shall never fail to understand
How blessed we are to possess this land!
So we shall unite standing proud and tall
Let none divide us, lest we fall!

Chorus

III
May God richly bless this territory!
May we ask three things of thee…
Courage for our great leaders
That they may rule our destiny!
We ask for wisdom for our people
That we may live in harmony!
And understanding for children
So they may cherish this legacy!

Chorus

== See also ==
- List of British anthems
