= Robert Mathavious =

Dr Robert A. Mathavious, OBE

Managing Director & CEO, British Virgin Islands Financial Services Commission
- Incumbent
- Assumed office December 2001

Personal details
- Born: Robert A. Mathavious
- Citizenship: British Virgin Islands
- Occupation: Economist, Public Servant, Speaker
- Awards: Order of the British Empire (OBE)

Robert Anderson Mathavious OBE served as Acting Governor of the British Virgin Islands from December 22 to December 29, 2017. He also served as Acting Governor in June and July 2016 and August 2017. He also served as Managing Director and Chief Executive Officer of the BVI Financial Services Commission.

Mathavious was appointed Officer of the Order of the British Empire (OBE) in the 2020 Birthday Honours for services to the British Virgin Islands and financial services.
