= Virgin Islands pledge =

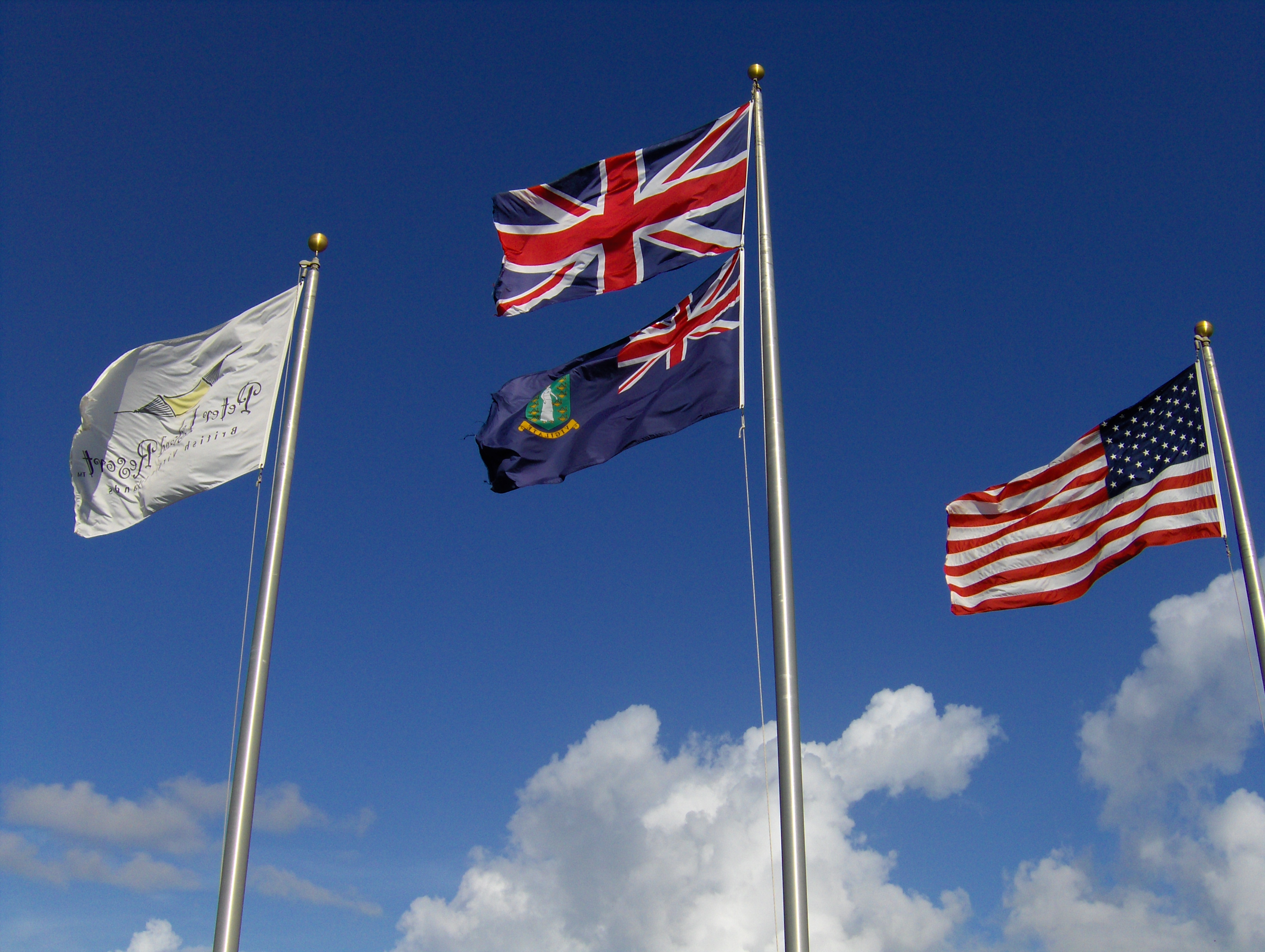
- Territorial pledge British Virgin Islands
- Adopted: 2016

The Virgin Islands pledge is a pledge of allegiance to the Virgin Islands, a British overseas territory. It was officially adopted by the territory's House of Assembly on 23 June 2016. It's intended to be commonly recited by Virgin Islanders in unison at public events, especially in schools, and during public celebrations. The pledge was first publicly recited on 1 July 2016 at Territory Day celebrations by Premier Orlando Smith and members of the government. The pledge reads:

I pledge to my country, the Territory of the Virgin Islands, to encourage national pride and dignity, render patriotic service, promote justice for all, be true to God and remain dedicated to these Virgin Islands.

Adoption of the pledge was a project of Myron Walwyn, the territory's Minister for Education and Culture. He explained that its adoption was part of the government's efforts "to build a nation of citizens and residents that understand and have deep reverence for our heritage as Virgin Islanders". In the same vein the government adopted a territorial song and an official territorial uniform. The government also erected flagpoles at each school and public schoolchildren now sing the territorial song as they raise the UK and VI flags each school day morning.

The pledge has received a mixed reaction. Some questioned the need for a pledge at all. The reference to God in the pledge is a source of some element of controversy too. House of Assembly member, Alvera Maduro-Caines argued it was appropriate. She said she saw 'nothing wrong with God being a part of the pledge as we are a Christian and God fearing society'. Others felt the overtly religious reference infringed their rights. The leader of the People's Empowerment Party, Natalio D. Wheatley, said there was a "glaring problem" with the pledge: that it is "oxymoronic" to refer to a territory as a country. The use of the capitalised term "Territory" suggests the word is part of the territory's name when it's not. Grammatically, the reference to "these Virgin Islands" rather than "the Virgin Islands" at the end of the pledge renders the pledge ungrammatical when recited outside the territory. There was little public engagement concerning the wording of the pledge before its adoption.
