= National Health Insurance (British Virgin Islands) =

Peebles Hospital in Road Town, British Virgin Islands.

The National Health Insurance scheme (or NHI) is a form of national health insurance established by the Government of the British Virgin Islands through the Ministry of Health, with a goal to provide access to and financial coverage for health care services to British Virgin Islands residents. A National Health Insurance scheme was first considered in 2006 (if one ignores the efforts as far back as 1985 as evidenced by the 1986 Budget Address by then chief minister Cyril B. Romney), but it took over a decade to come to fruition. It eventually came into effect on 1 January 2016.

The scheme is based on two fundamental principles:

1. payments are shared based on ability to pay, without worrying about health risks such as age, occupation or pre-existing health conditions; and
2. healthcare benefits are equally available to everyone.

The scheme is administered by the Social Security Board of the British Virgin Islands. The Deputy Director with responsibility for the scheme is Mr Roy Barry. The primary legislation relating to the scheme was implemented by amendments to the Social Security Act (Cap 266), and the subsidiary implementing legislation is the Social Security (National Health Insurance) Regulations, 2015.

From a relatively early stage of the scheme's life, doubts were expressed about its long term sustainability. In the year 2017 it ran at a deficit of nearly US$650,000, with greater losses predicted in 2018. In 2019 the Premier announced that the scheme was to be restructured because "the current scheme is unsustainable and is in threat of failure", but did not provide any details beyond stating that the review would be "comprehensive".

He expounded upon this in 2020, noting the government has to subsidise the scheme to the tune of US$42 million a year, and if it was not reformed it could "bankrupt the British Virgin Islands".

The National Health Insurance (British Virgin Islands) is part of the membership of the Inter-American Conference on Social Security it is a technical and specialized international organization, which has the objective of promoting the development of social protection and security in America.

== History ==
As of 2013 the British Virgin Islands Health Services Authority provided approximately US$6.6 million worth of services annually, but only receives about $1.8 million from patients. The shortfall is paid principally by the Ministry of Health and the balance is either written off or allowed to roll over as uncollected debts by the BVIHSA. Public health care is also effectively subsidised by pricing services at a level which is deliberately set below the actual cost of providing the care. User fees are estimated to recover just 8% of the operating costs of primary and secondary health care services. As a result, the net expenditure on health accounts for approximately 17% of total government expenditure. Attempts to reduce the strain on Government by increasing the cost of services have proved to be politically controversial.

To address the chronic shortfall, the Government proposed devising a National Health Insurance scheme to essentially pass most of this cost on to employed persons and the businesses that employed them. The Ministry of Health developed the supporting operational framework and legislation, in consultation with the University of the West Indies Health Economics Unit.

The proposed scheme was first suggested in approximately 2006. Whether by coincidence or design, this was approximately the same time as the Government embarked an ambitious rebuilding project in relation to the main Government hospital, Peebles Hospital. The new hospital has been a financial disaster for the Government. It was originally budgeted at approximately US$10 million, and expected to take just under 2 years to construct. In the event, the hospital cost well over US$100 million to construct, and took over a decade. It also costs a further US$16 million to furnish to become operational. by 2012 public debt had quadrupled from pre-2007 levels to approximately US$113 million (approximately 10.3% of GDP). Nearly 84% of that public debt was attributable to the new public hospital project, exacerbating budget stresses.

The NHI scheme was seen as a way of alleviating the cash-drain caused by underwriting public health expenditure. Initial budgets provided for the scheme to raise approximately US$22 million, leaving the Government still funding a balance of approximately US$8 million. However, the proposal remains controversial amongst the public, not least because - in simple terms - it amounts to the equivalent of a 7.5% increase in taxes.

However, even with the expected revenue from the NHI scheme, the hospital will still be heavily underfunded, with an estimated budget shortfall of US$7 million in 2016.

== Commencement ==
Implementation of the scheme was repeatedly delayed. Legislation was implemented to bring NHI into effect in 2014. Although the proposed date at the time was for NHI to have come into effect in October 2014, this did not happen. Revised dates have included January 2015 and September 2015, although during election campaigning the Minister for Health suggested this might be pushed back to January 2016. This is consistent with press assumptions that, because NHI will involve making deductions from payroll (which will be perceived similarly to a tax increase), implementation would likely to be postponed until after the 2015 general election (which occurred in June).

Eventually registration of persons commenced on 1 September 2015, and the scheme itself came into effect on 1 January 2016. Although it had previously been suggested that collections would start three months prior to any benefits being available, the Ministry for Health confirmed that benefits will be available immediately from the time of first payments.

=== Early experiences ===
In September 2016 a local newsite ran an article referring to the National Health Insurance scheme as a "national disappointment". But the article did note that much of the disappointment arose from local health service providers increasing fees beyond coverage levels forcing consumers to pay increased out-of-pocket claims.

== Controversy ==
The scheme has been controversial since its inception. Upon its implementation one news site described it as having been subjected to a "barrage of criticisms from the public". However, because all of the major political parties in the British Virgin Islands supported the scheme, there has been very little debate over the proposals and progress towards the scheme has continued despite changes in Government. Nonetheless, the strong criticisms have been voiced in relation to the proposals, including the relatively expensive cost of the insurance compared to the private sector, the relatively low lifetime cap (and that a person will continue having to pay contributions after they hit the lifetime cap), and questions regarding the validity of Government statistics which were used to justify the introduction of the scheme. Doubts have also been expressed whether the limited staff and resources will be able to handle the estimated 200,000 claims each year.

Shortly after registration commenced, an online petition started urging the Government to abandon the proposed National Health Insurance scheme and reconsider the issues. That petition was brushed aside, which led to threats of potential legal action.

=== Impact on small businesses ===
Concerns have also been expressed in the media and by politicians that the additional levy on salary (for both the employer and employee) would depress wages and limit job creation. These concerns have been largely brushed aside. The introduction on a further levy on employers may create a disincentive to employ additional persons and create downward pressure on wages, with one local news website warning of the risk of "huge layoffs".

=== Reinsurance ===
To date the scheme has no reinsurers, and has not tendered for any reinsurers. Private health insurance brokers in the Territory have questioned the viability of this.

=== Financing ===
The Government has come under periodic pressure, questioning whether the entire project is financially viable. Only in 2015 did the Government make limited details of actuarial studies conducted in 2012 available to the public. Opponents of the scheme have pointed to studies which purportedly show that the scheme could potentially run at a deficit of US$45 – 200 million by the fourth year of its operation, excluding costs associated with "lawsuits over confidentiality, malpractice and errors and omissions". Including such costs the shortfall may increase to as much as US$400 million. By comparison, annual Government revenues for the entire Territory in 2014 were US$302 million. Subsequent actuarial studies indicated that the Government may have underestimated the costs by as much as 14%. Despite the fact that the official census records a population of just over 28,000 in the Territory, nearly 40,000 enrolled in the NHI scheme, which may reflect a large number of non-residents living in the nearby U.S. Virgin Islands who hold BVI citizenship also registering.

A little over a year after the scheme was introduced, the Government was already expressing concerns about its sustainability.

=== Regulatory requirements ===
All insurers are required by British Virgin Islands law to maintain a regulatory licence to conduct insurance business, to have business plans and financial feasibility approved by the independent regulator, and to deposit capital in a secured account with respect to long term contingent liabilities. The NHI scheme was not required to do any of these things.

=== Withdrawal of benefits ===
In November 2016 the director of the scheme, Roy Barry, announced that thousands of employees were to have their benefits withdrawn because their employers had not paid over the relevant contributions. This action was taken notwithstanding that the employers in question had deducted the contributions from the employees' pay. Newspaper reports subsequently pointed out that this action was illegal under the relevant statutory instruments.

=== Lawsuits ===
In February 2017 it was reported that the Social Security Board was being sued a Florida-based company, JIPA Network, in relation to an October 2015 agreement to provide access to thousands of preferred healthcare providers overseas.

== Funding ==
=== Contributions ===
NHI will be funded by contributions made by all employed persons working in the British Virgin Islands, and deducted in the same manner as social security contributions. Contributions will be based on a percentage rate applied to a maximum of twice the national insurable earnings which was most recently set at US$38,610 per annum for 2014. Accordingly, the ceiling for NHI deductions on earnings would be US$77,220 - any income earned above that figure would not be subject to deduction. Income up to that level would be subject to the NHI deduction at the proposed initial rate is 7.5%. That rate is to be split equally between employer and employee - so the employee has 3.75% deducted from their salary, and the employer pays a 3.75% levy on payroll. The maximum monthly contribution for one individual would be US$482.63 per month based up on 2014 maximum insurable earnings.

However, unemployed spouses will have to contribute 7.5% based on their partners' insurable earnings. Accordingly, couples where only one partner works will be subject to effectively a double levy. Accordingly, an employed person with a non-working spouse might be required to pay as much as US$965.26.

Children under 18 will be exempt (or up to 25 if in full-time education).

=== Budget ===
Initially financial modelling (conducted in 2012) projected that the total revenue generated annually by NHI was expected to be $74,308,000, and expenditure was expected to be approximately $70,788,000 annually in the initial stage. The expected revenues were broken down into Government's direct contribution (approximately $39,273,000); premium contributions (approximately $28,825,000); and revenue from investment returns, co-payments and surcharges (approximately $6,210,000). Under some pressure from the public, the Government requested a fresh actuarial assessment in 2015. When released the second actuarial study indicated that the expenditure could be as high as $81,000,000 (or 14% higher than projected), and that the Government's contribution would thereby increase to approximately $43,000,000.

A revised consultants report in June 2016 indicated that costs were expected to be $80.5 million in the first year (2016) and rising to $92.5 million by 2020. 54 per cent of that cost is to be met directly by Government, and 46 per cent of the cost from mandatory contributions by workers. The same report also advised the Government to include a $16.7 million contingency on its accounts for the "numerous contingent events and risks" that the scheme is exposed to.

In July 2016 it was reported that "over 800 people" were penalised for registering late on the scheme.

=== Deficits ===
In June 2018 it was reported that the NHI scheme had run at a net loss of US$646,843 for the calendar year 2017. Losses were expected to be greater in 2018 because of the cumulative effects of Hurricane Irma. The same report also indicated that 36,057 persons were registered with NHI at the end of 2017, despite the resident population of the British Virgin Islands being only approximately 27,000.

== Benefits ==
The following categories of health care services will be insured under the NHI for treatment within the Territory only:

- Preventative care
- Hospital room and board
- Surgery
- Diagnostic procedures
- Intensive care
- Casualty and emergency care
- Pharmaceutical services
- Mental health
- Dental care
- Vision care
- Approved prosthetic devices

Approval for coverage for overseas treatment will be determined by a Medical Review Committee with five members who will control access to overseas care.

Under NHI there will be a proposed maximum lifetime limit for cost of care of US$1,000,000.

=== Copayments ===
Most treatment which is insured under NHI will be subject to a copayment. The present proposed copayments are:

- 0% at community health clinics
- 5% at the public hospital
- 10% at private clinics in network
- 40% at private clinics out of network (plus US$100 deductible)
- 20% at overseas clinics in network (plus US$500 deductible)
- 40% at overseas clinics out of network (required to be pre- approved by Medical Review Committee)

=== Limitations ===
Certain limitations on coverage are proposed:

- Air ambulance benefits will be capped at US$20,000
- No emergency overseas treatment without Medical Review Committee approval
- Maximum lifetime benefits limit of US$1,000,000
- Maternity benefits are restricted to treatment within the British Virgin Islands and to a maximum of US$1,500
- MRI scans restricted to US$1,500 per year and require Medical Review Committee pre-approval
- General diagnostic testing is capped at US$500 per year
- No overseas out-patient surgical procedures
- No coverage for overseas prescription pharmaceuticals

== Changes ==
In November 2016, after the scheme had been running for just under a year, Government announced it would make changes to the scheme to address some of the criticisms relating to health service providers increasing their charges and profiteering off the scheme. This followed a period of sustained criticism when allegations were made about providers dramatically increasing prices, and users of the scheme being left with large charges under the co-pay.

== See also ==
- National health insurance
- Universal health coverage
