= William Boyd McCleary =

British diplomat (born 1949)

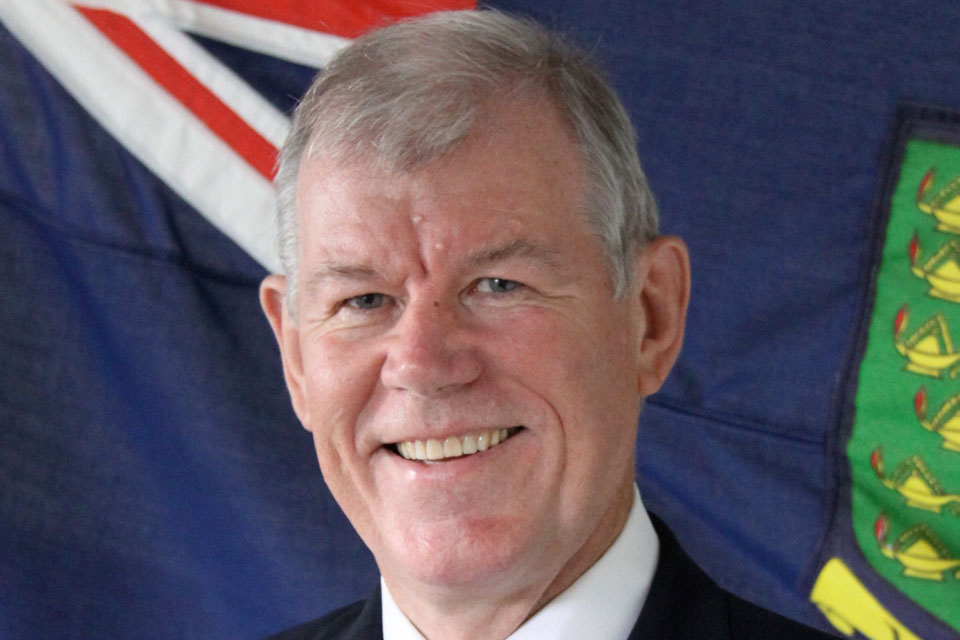

Governor of the British Virgin Islands
- In office 20 August 2010 – 1 August 2014
- Monarch: Elizabeth II
- Premier: Ralph T. O'Neal; Orlando Smith
- Preceded by: V. Inez Archibald (acting)
- Succeeded by: V. Inez Archibald (acting)

Personal details
- Born: 30 March 1949 (age 76) Belfast, Northern Ireland, UK

Viceregal styles of William Boyd McCleary (2010-2014)
- Reference style: His Excellency
- Spoken style: Your Excellency

William Boyd McCleary (born 30 March 1949) is a retired British diplomat originally from Belfast, Northern Ireland.

In September 2010 he was appointed Governor of the British Virgin Islands, to act as the de facto head of state in the Territory. Prior to his appointment as governor McCleary served as High Commissioner to Malaysia from 2006 to 2010. In 2008 he was presented by Malaysian activists with a memorandum condemning the Batang Kali massacre in which the Scots Guards executed 24 unarmed civilians.

Shortly after his arrival in the British Virgin Islands, the territory was damaged by Hurricane Earl. At the time of his appointment there was a degree of tension over constitutional matters between the United Kingdom and the British Virgin Islands,; McCleary was praised in the local press for his deft handling of the situation. He is on the advisory board of OMFIF where he is regularly involved in meetings regarding the financial and monetary system. Previously, he was also one of the patrons of the British Theatre Playhouse, a company aiming to produce British theatrical plays and musical shows.

== Offices ==
Preceded by David Pearey	Governor of the British Virgin Islands; 2010–2014	Succeeded by John Duncan
Preceded by Bruce Cleghorn	High Commissioner to Malaysia; 2006–2010	Succeeded by Simon Featherstone
