= Effects of Hurricane Irma in the Lesser Antilles =

Hurricane Irma
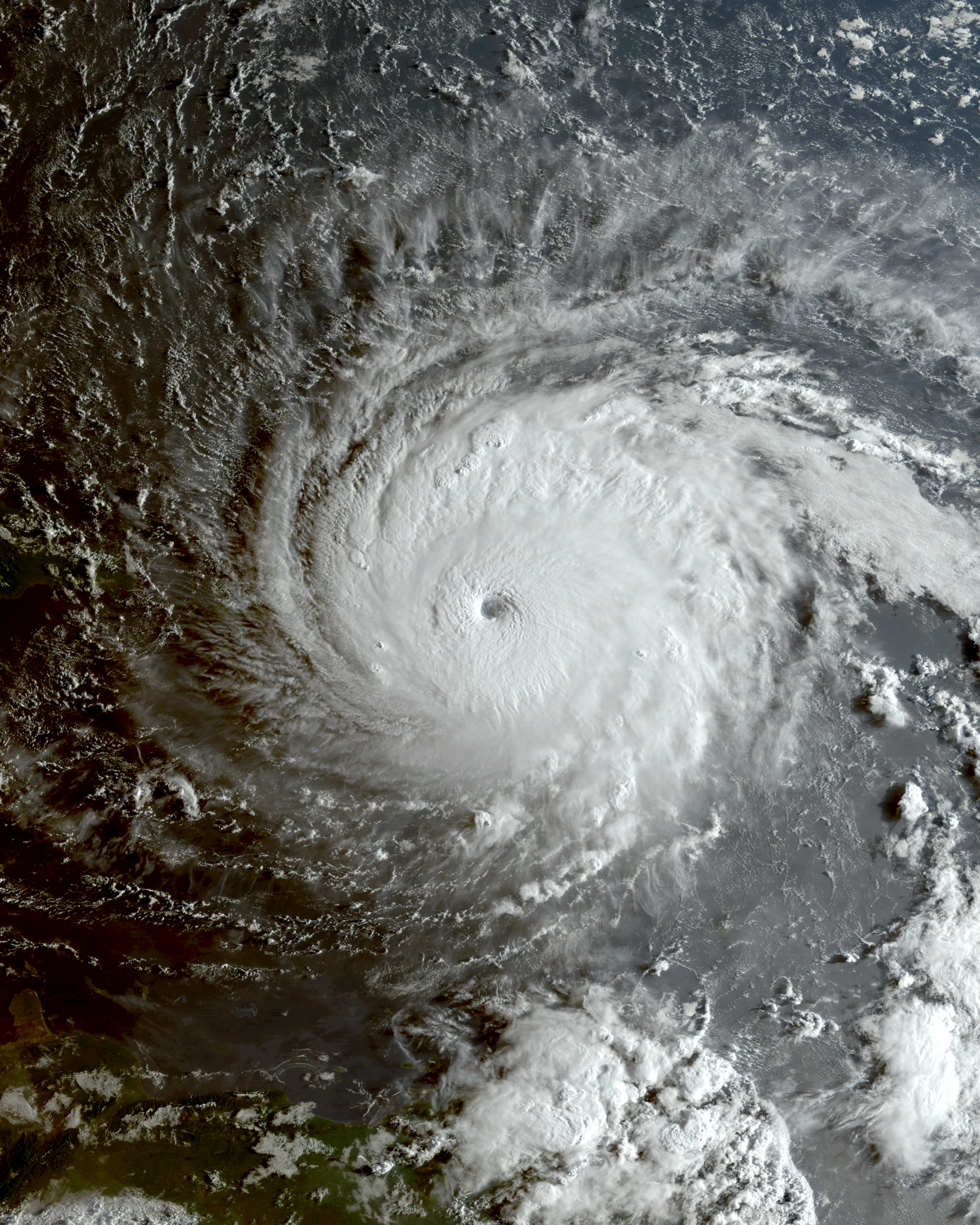
- Hurricane Irma at its peak intensity while making landfall in Saint Martin early on September 6

Meteorological history
- Duration: September 5–7, 2017

Category 5 major hurricane
- 1-minute sustained (SSHWS/NWS)
- Highest winds: 180 mph (285 km/h)
- Lowest pressure: 914 mbar (hPa); 26.99 inHg

Overall effects
- Fatalities: 24 direct
- Damage: $12.4 billion (2017 USD)
- Areas affected: Leeward Islands; Dominica; Barbados
- Part of the 2017 Atlantic hurricane season
- History: Meteorological history; Effects: Lesser Antilles; Florida; Other wikis: Commons: Irma images

Hurricane Irma caused severe damage and destruction in the Lesser Antilles.

== Preparations ==
Infrared satellite loop of Irma approaching the northern Leeward Islands on September 5, around the time of its upgrade to a Category 5 hurricane

In Antigua and Barbuda, residents safeguarded their homes and cleaned up their properties in anticipation of strong winds. Emergency crews were put on standby at public shelters and hospitals by September 5 to assist with any evacuations. Expecting a direct hit, more than half of the residents on Barbuda took shelter, and relief supplies were preemptively mobilized. The National Emergency Management Organization on Saint Lucia urged small craft operators and swimmers to be mindful of forecasts for high surf. Small Craft Warnings and High Surf Advisories were hoisted for Dominica, where residents were urged to remain vigilant of the potential for high waves, landslides, and flooding.

In Guadeloupe, low-lying and cliff-edge homes were evacuated at the threat of flooding and erosion. Schools and public businesses closed on September 5 and 6. Hospitals stocked up on three days' worth of supplies and checked the functionality of their generators. Of the island's 32 communes, 22 activated their emergency plans; 1,500 people were urged to take shelter. The island sustained relatively minor damage and became the base for relief efforts on Saint Martin and Saint Barthélemy. Though the core of the hurricane was expected to remain north of the island, a yellow alert was issued for Martinique due to the likelihood of rough seas. The island dispatched relief supplies and military reinforcements to its neighboring islands of Guadeloupe, Saint Martin. and Saint Barthélemy, which faced a greater risk of a direct impact.

From a relatively early stage of its development, Irma was predicted to travel close to, or over, the British Virgin Islands. However, the late stage intensification of the storm was less well anticipated. As little as two days before the storm struck, the BVI Department of Disaster Management were predicting maximum expected wind speed of 180 km/h (110 mph) - on the boundary between a Category 2 and Category 3 hurricane. Over the course of 5 September 2017 Hurricane Irma rapidly intensified until it had strengthened well beyond sustained wind speeds required for classification as a Category 5 hurricane, into the strongest hurricane ever recorded over the open Atlantic Ocean (excluding the Gulf of Mexico and Caribbean Sea). Although the BVI government recommended the full evacuation of Anegada, about 180 people stayed behind, while the rest went to Tortola.

== Impact ==
=== Antigua and Barbuda ===
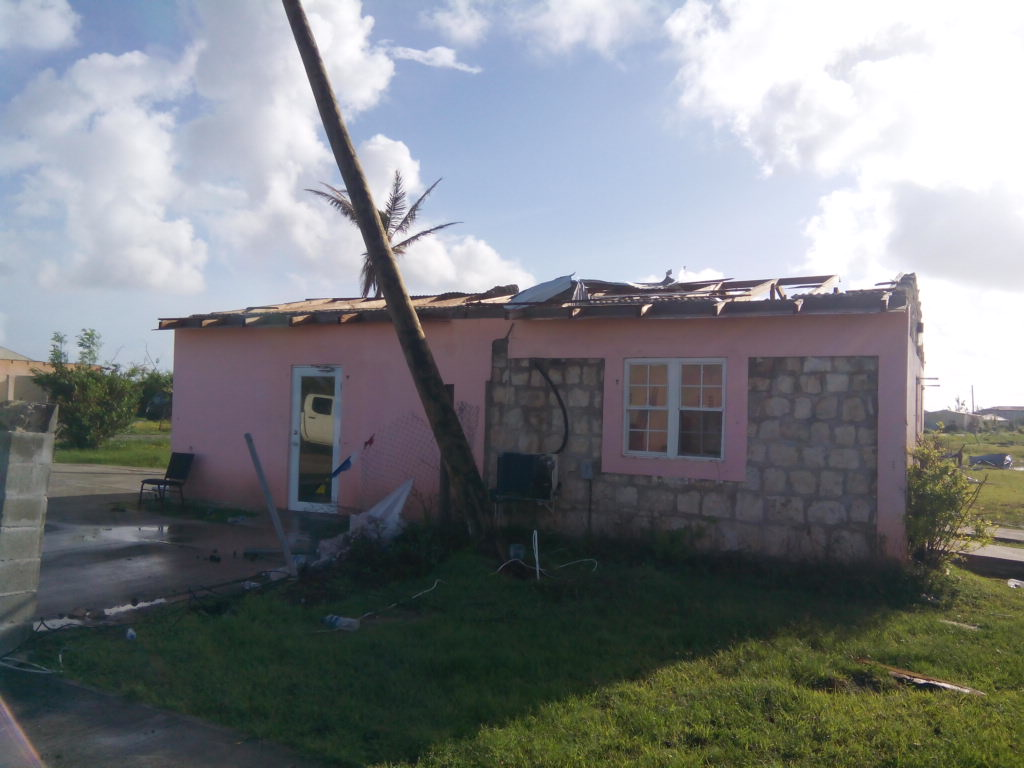
A house in Barbuda that was badly damaged by the hurricane

The eyewall of the hurricane moved over Barbuda at its record peak intensity early on September 6; a weather station observed a wind gust of 260 km/h (160 mph). The same station also recorded a minimum barometric pressure of 916.1 mbar (27.05 inHg). The exact state of the island remained unclear for hours after Irma's passage, as downed phone lines ceased all communication with nearby islands. Later that afternoon, Prime Minister Gaston Browne surveyed the territory by helicopter, revealing an effectively uninhabitable island. Irma damaged or destroyed 95% of the structures on Barbuda, including its hospital, schools, and both of its hotels; it completely flattened some residential blocks while submerging others. The destruction rendered the island's sole airport and much of its infrastructure inoperative—including water and telecommunication services—which further hampered relief efforts. Property damage on Barbuda ranged from $150 million to $300 million. A total of three storm-related deaths were reported on the island.

In addition to the catastrophic impact on Barbuda's human residents, concern turned to the storm's effects on the island's wildlife. The island's only endemic bird, the near-threatened Barbuda warbler, numbered less than 2,000 individuals prior to the hurricane. For some time it was unknown if the warbler survived the hurricane or its aftermath; however within a few months it was confirmed that not only did the species survive, but most of the birds survived the storm. Barbuda's Codrington Lagoon, home to the largest colony of magnificent frigatebirds in the Caribbean, with an estimated 2,500 nesting pairs, was also inundated by the storm surge.

Remaining just outside of Irma's strongest windfield, Antigua sustained less severe damage, in the form of leveled roofs and fences, downed power poles and lines, and uprooted trees. Some street flooding also took place in low-lying areas. Three people were treated for minor storm-related injuries. Forensic disaster analysts from the Center for Disaster Management and Risk Reduction Technology (CEDIM), a Germany-based risk management agency, estimate that economic losses for Antigua and Barbuda will exceed $120 million.

=== Saint Martin ===
Aerial video of the damage on Saint Martin, September 7, 2017

On the morning of September 6, Irma's center crossed the island of Saint Martin while the storm was at peak intensity, sweeping away entire structures, submerging roads and cars, and triggering an island-wide blackout. Irma's extreme winds ripped trees out of the ground and sent vehicles and debris from damaged structures scattered across the territory. On the French side of Saint-Martin, entire marinas around Marigot were left in ruins, littered with the stranded remnants of boats that had smashed into each other. A hotel caught on fire, but dangerous conditions and impassable roads prevented firefighters from putting out the blaze. Another hotel lost nearly all of its ground floor. Media images depicted devastated room interiors with furniture hurled around after the winds had shattered their windows. Irma killed four people on the French side of the island and injured 50 others, one of whom was in critical condition. As many as 95% of the buildings there were damaged to some degree; 60% of those were totally uninhabitable. Estimates from CEDIM indicate a minimum of $950 million worth of economic losses. Total losses exceeded €3.5 billion (US$4.17 billion).

A similar situation unfolded in Sint Maarten, Saint Martin's Dutch half, as intense winds ripped through buildings and lifted vehicles aloft "as if they were matches". The hurricane wreaked havoc on Princess Juliana International Airport, with "huge chunks of the building [strewn] across the runway and a jet bridge snapped in half." It demolished or severely damaged about 70% of Sint Maarten's houses, forcing thousands of residents into public shelters. There were 4 deaths and 23 injuries, 11 of which were serious, in the Dutch territory. Irma is considered the worst natural disaster to hit Sint Maarten; the extent of its damage far exceeded that of any previous hurricane. Total damages were estimated at €2.5 billion (US$2.98 billion).

=== Saint Barthélemy ===
Most intense landfalling Atlantic hurricanes Intensity is measured solely by central pressure
| Rank | Hurricane (Note: Storms with designations in quotation marks are officially unnamed. Tropical storms and hurricanes were not named before the year 1950.) | Season | Landfall pressure |
|---|---|---|---|
| 1 | "Labor Day" | 1935 | 892 mbar (hPa) |
| 2 | Melissa | 2025 | 897 mbar (hPa) |
| 3 | Camille | 1969 | 900 mbar (hPa) |
| 3 | Gilbert | 1988 | 900 mbar (hPa) |
| 5 | Dean | 2007 | 905 mbar (hPa) |
| 6 | "Cuba" | 1924 | 910 mbar (hPa) |
| 6 | Dorian | 2019 | 910 mbar (hPa) |
| 8 | Janet | 1955 | 914 mbar (hPa) |
| 8 | Irma | 2017 | 914 mbar (hPa) |
| 10 | "Cuba" | 1932 | 918 mbar (hPa) |
Sources: HURDAT, AOML/HRD, NHC

Irma left widespread destruction and disastrous flooding along its path over the French island of Saint Barthélemy, southeast of Saint Martin. Describing the extent of the destruction, one local compared it to "a bomb that burned all vegetation," while another said that it were as if the hurricane had effectively "erased the island from the map". Violent seas swept away entire coastal establishments, with one hotel being stripped of all but its foundation. Streets in the capital of Gustavia were turned into rushing rivers, which carried away vehicles and pieces of furniture. The island's fire station was inundated with up to 6.4 ft (2.0 m) of flood waters. With scores of homes and much of the infrastructure destroyed, the majority of the island's population was left stranded and without water, electricity or phone service. The associated economic losses could exceed $480 million according to CEDIM's analysts.

Preliminary assessments from the French government indicate that Hurricane Irma caused a combined €1.2 billion (US$1.43 billion) in insured losses across the French territories of Saint-Martin and Saint Barts. This total covered private property such as homes, vehicles and businesses (including lost revenue); the extent of the damage to infrastructural and public facilities remains undetermined. Nonetheless, this made Irma one of the costliest natural disasters to hit the French Republic in 50 years.

On January 30, 2018, roughly five months after Irma, an analysis was published indicating that an anemometer on the island recorded an unofficial gust to 320 km/h (199 mph) before failing.

=== Anguilla ===
The British Overseas Territory of Anguilla saw the eyewall of the storm pass over it on September 6. Many homes and schools were destroyed, and the island's only hospital was badly damaged. The devastation was particularly severe in East End, where the winds uprooted scores of trees and power poles and demolished a number of houses. In The Valley, the island's capital, the hurricane blew out the windows of government buildings. Rough seas inflicted heavy damage upon several bays and harbors, and a seaside restaurant was completely eradicated. About 90% of roads were left impassable. The island's air traffic control tower was damaged, exacerbating the already poor communication with the island. One death was reported on the island. Estimates of losses on the island total at least $190 million.

=== British Virgin Islands ===
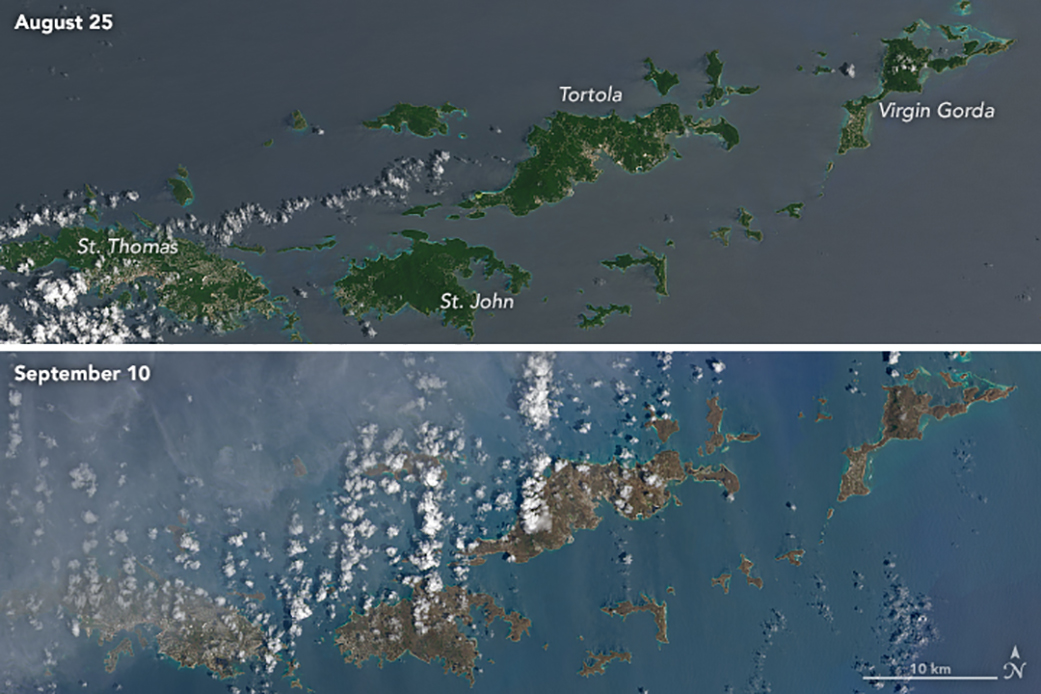
Operational Land Imager imagery by Landsat 8 of the Virgin Islands from before and after Hurricane Irma's impact, depicting a "browning" of the landscape and vegetation.

Damage in the British Virgin Islands was extensive. Numerous buildings and roads were destroyed on the island of Tortola, which bore the brunt of the hurricane's core. Four people were confirmed dead. The Territory also experienced an abnormally high number of deaths in the months of September to December 2017, after the passage of the hurricane. Along Cane Garden Bay, the storm surge submerged several seaside bars and a gas station. Satellite images revealed many of the island's residential zones had been left in ruins. The hurricane passed over Necker Island, also causing severe damage and destroying the mansion of Richard Branson. By the time the storm hit the British Virgin Islands, it had intensified to such a level as to be detected on seismometers calibrated for earthquakes.

The estimated damage to property in the British Virgin Islands was initially calculated to be US$3.6 billion. Approximately 85% of housing stock, consisting of 4,200 homes, were damaged or destroyed in the territory. Roads across the territory were left impassable. Communities were essentially cut-off from each other and the wider world. Telecommunications was rendered virtually non-existent by the destruction of the cellular telephone network and the almost total loss of telephone poles for landlines. Most homes and businesses were destroyed on the island of Jost Van Dyke, the smallest of the B.V.I.'s four main islands. Irma damaged the Elmore Stoutt High School on Tortola, causing students to move to a temporary building. The Balsam Ghut prison was heavily damaged, allowing some prisoners to escape. The building which housed the Department of Disaster Management was almost totally destroyed in the storm. The Governor, Gus Jaspert, who had only been sworn into office 13 days previously, declared a state of emergency - the first time this has ever happened in the Territory. After the storm, restoration of electricity took approximately 5 months.

=== U.S. Virgin Islands ===
U.S. Navy video of damage in the U.S. Virgin Islands

Irma's effects in the U.S. Virgin Islands were most profound on Saint Thomas, where at least 300 millimetres (12 in) of rain fell, and on Saint John. Saint Thomas island suffered widespread structural damage, including to its police station and airport. Patients from the fourth and third floors of Charlotte Amalie's hospital had to be relocated to lower floors due to flooding from roof leaks. Three deaths were attributed to Irma on the island. On nearby Saint Croix, there were communication issues and some damage to the infrastructure. Saint John lost access to ferry and cargo services, along with access to the local airport. Due to its normal reliance on electricity from Saint Thomas, the island was left without power. Total damage from the three islands was at least $1.1 billion.

=== Rest of the Lesser Antilles ===
Large swells ahead of Irma washed ashore debris and sea life in Castries, Saint Lucia, blocking some roads. Seaside roads were inundated with water. One surfer was killed amid rough surf in Barbados after hitting a reef and breaking his neck. Trees were also destroyed. The hurricane's effects, such as violent seas and rattling trees, were intense enough to be detected by seismographs in Guadeloupe. Several houses were damaged. Around 8,000 households and a water supply network on that island lost power during the storm, leaving several communes in the dark without running water. Overall damage was limited to external parts of houses and trees that were blown onto roads and three unmanned ships wrecked by rough seas.

Saint Kitts and Nevis endured similar conditions to other islands. Blustery rainstorms triggered scattered power outages and disabled the island's water system, but per the International Red Cross, the islands were spared the level of destruction seen elsewhere. Still, Prime Minister Timothy Harris stated that property and infrastructure had sustained "significant damage." The Dutch territories of Saba and Sint Eustatius were also struck by the hurricane's winds, resulting in infrastructural damage, water shortages and telecommunication outages. Several houses were left uninhabitable. On Saba, the hurricane also defoliated trees and injured a few people. CEDIM's analysts expect economic losses of $20–65 million for the two islands.

== Aftermath ==
=== Antigua and Barbuda ===
In response to Hurricane Jose's approach, the Government of Antigua and Barbuda issued a mandatory evacuation on September 9 for any remaining residents on Barbuda. A Miami cargo plane landed on Antigua later that day, carrying over 60 tons (120,000 lbs) of relief supplies for the displaced storm victims—including bottled water, canned food and power generators.

=== British Overseas Territories ===
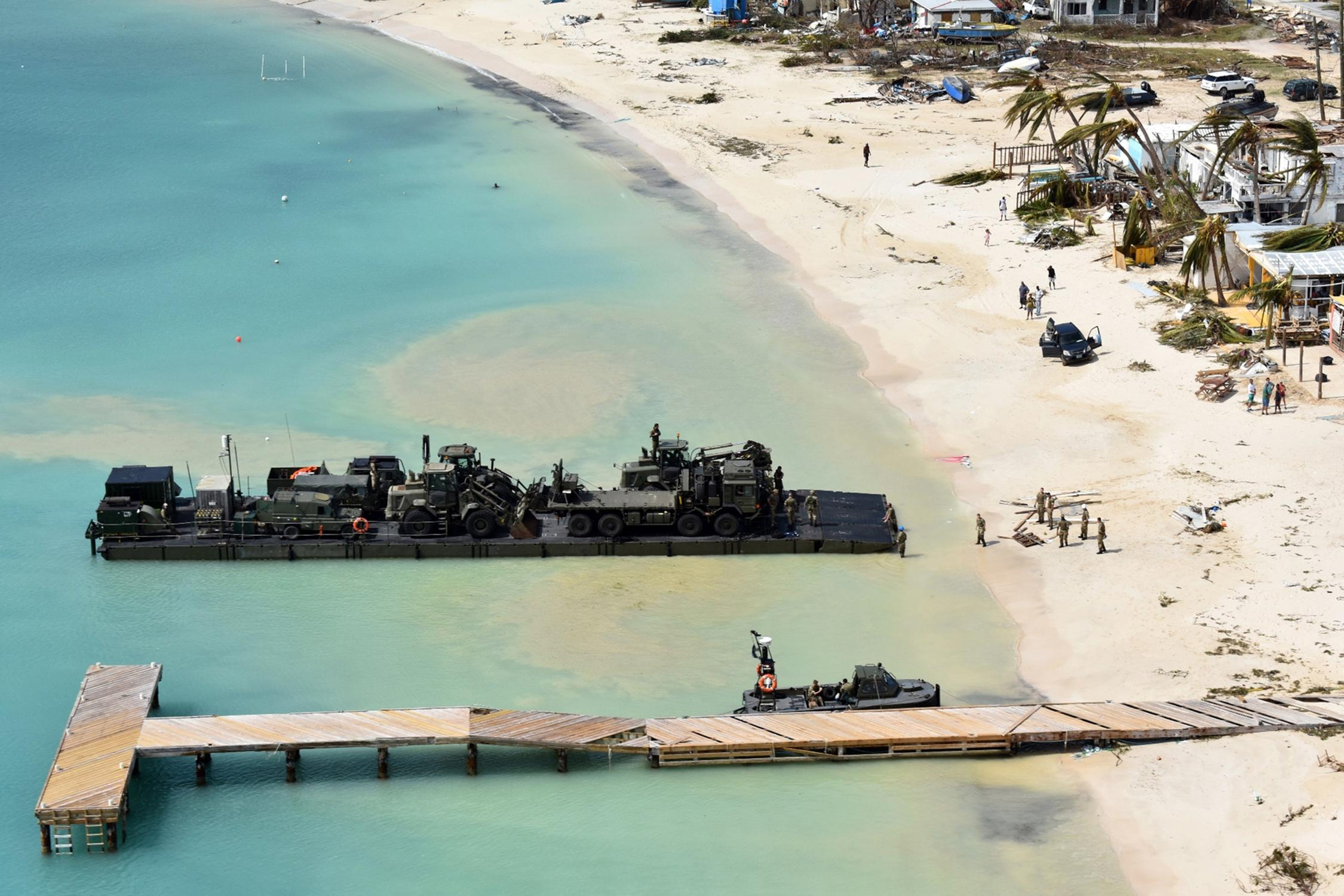
A UK Royal Logistics Corp landing raft delivers emergency relief to Anguilla

Availability of food, potable water, fuel and medicine were highly limited. Residents had to queue, sometimes for hours, in the sun to obtain necessities. Aid distribution centres were set up in Cane Garden Bay, East End and Hunthum's Ghut. In the days after the hurricane there were reports of looting of local businesses. This included not just food and medical supplies, but also non-essential consumer goods. The looting was brought under control when British troops arrived as part of the relief supplies. RFA Mounts Bay stationed itself near Anguilla and provided support and relief work to the island with its helicopters and 40 marines and army engineers. The ship delivered 6 tonnes of emergency aid to Anguilla and army engineers repaired a fuel leak at Anguilla's main petrol dump, restored power to the island's hospital and provided shelters for those left homeless by the hurricane. The ship arrived in the British Virgin Islands on September 8, 2017, to provide emergency relief to the islands, including providing shelters, food and water. HMS Ocean was diverted from the Mediterranean to provide relief from Gibraltar to the affected British Overseas Territories of Anguilla, British Virgin Islands and Turks and Caicos on September 7, and aid was also supplied by the Department for International Development from their disaster response center at Kemble Airfield. As part of a £32 million operation named Operation Ruman, nearly 500 UK military personnel with emergency relief were dispatched from RAF Brize Norton. This included the first deployment of No. 38 Expeditionary Air Wing with three RAF aircraft: two Airbus A400M Atlas and one C-130J Hercules to support relief efforts.

The British government also drafted two members of the UK police cadre into the region on September 10, and 53 police officers were drafted from RAF Brize Norton to the affected British Overseas Territories on September 15 to help maintain order. UK politicians, including the chairs of the foreign affairs and development select committees, criticized both the government's preparations for the storm and its response as inadequate. The UK's Foreign Secretary Boris Johnson visited Tortola on 13 September 2017 and said that he was reminded of photos of Hiroshima after it had been hit by the atom bomb.

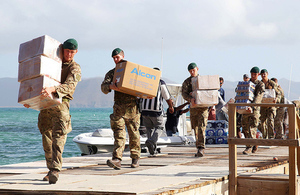
Royal Marines delivering aid and providing support to the islanders of Jost Van Dyke, British Virgin Islands

By September 15, the United Kingdom had over 70 military personnel and 4 police officers in Anguilla and had delivered 15 tonnes of aid to the island. In the British Virgin Islands, Royal Marines had cleared the airfield so that it was operational for the delivery of aid into the islands, with more than 200 British military personnel and 54 UK police officers on the ground and 8 tonnes of aid delivered to the islands. 120 British military personnel were on the ground in Turks and Caicos, and over 150 shelter kits and 720 liters of water were delivered to the islands on September 15.

Amendments to international aid rules by the Organisation for Economic Co-operation and Development (or OECD) allowed for the UK government to provide access to £13 billion worth of aid to the affected British Overseas Territories, through the UK's Official Development Assistance (ODA) by November 2017.

Recovery and rebuilding efforts in the Territory were hampered by low levels of insurance coverage. The Government itself had a policy of "self-insurance", and other than the Central Administration Complex, virtually none of its buildings or vehicles were insured. Private homeowners also have relatively low levels of hurricane insurance. In previous natural disasters the Government has provided emergency assistance to residents, providing funding for repairs to homes that are uninsured. This created a moral hazard in that only uninsured homes were eligible for Government assistance, and incentivised lower income property owners to be underinsured or completely uninsured. To assist insured homeowners, the Government formed a temporary dedicated Insurance Tribunal to hear and determine insurance claims.

It took several days before Terrance B. Lettsome International Airport reopened for non-military traffic after the passage of the hurricane. Although it was only lightly damaged, communications equipment was destroyed, and the runway needed to be inspected and secured before allowing flight operations. In the seven days after it was reopened, a total of 1,597 (or approximately 5% of the population) was evacuated by airlift. In the Territory's 2018 annual budget address, the Minister of Finance reported a 46% decline in tourist arrivals, and projected a 9.3% decline in Government revenues, and a contraction of 2.6% in GDP. In May 2018 the Immigration Department of the British Virgin Islands announced that the population of the Territory has dropped by approximately 11% since Hurricanes Irma and Maria struck the previous year.

=== United States territories ===
In the USVI, residents and tourists alike were described as being in a state of traumatic shock. By September 7, the amphibious assault ship USS Wasp had arrived in the USVI to provide supplies, damage assessment, and evacuation assistance. Four additional warships, some of which had already been on their way to Texas to assist with Hurricane Harvey relief, were redirected to the region. At a September 10 news conference, Governor Kenneth Mapp described Irma as a "horrific disaster" for which "[t]here will be no restorations or solutions in days or weeks." The Federal Emergency Management Agency airlifted in goods for residents, who were subjected to a curfew. Norwegian Cruise Lines and Royal Caribbean Cruise Line agreed to transport tourists to Florida, contingent upon port availability following the state's own experience with Irma.

On Saint John, described as "perhaps the site of Irma's worst devastation on American soil," it took six days for an active-theater disaster zone to be established, leading to criticism of the U.S. government response. The National Guard was delayed in reaching Saint John due to the number of overturned boats left in the harbor.

Five months after Irma, two-thirds of the hospital beds on Saint Thomas were still unavailable, due to extensive physical damage and staffing shortages.

=== Saint Martin and French Overseas Department ===
Damage to Sint Maarten's harbor and to Princess Juliana International Airport left the Dutch part of Saint Martin unreachable, although the smaller Grand Case-Espérance Airport on the French side could be reopened by September 7 for supply aid by helicopter and airplane. The French armed forces based in Guadeloupe and French Guiana flew equipment and troops on board a CASA/IPTN CN-235 aircraft.

The following day, the Dutch military was able to airlift dialysis patients off the island while also dropping leaflets to warn islanders about the rapidly approaching Hurricane Jose. Although the airport was closed, 435 students and faculty of the American University of the Caribbean were evacuated by the U.S. military. On September 10, Dutch King Willem-Alexander departed for the region, with intentions to visit Sint Maarten and other affected Dutch territories and commonwealth members.

French President Emmanuel Macron followed this announcement by stating his intentions to visit the French part of the island on September 12 in order to bring aid supplies. In response to criticism of the French handling of the disaster, 1,000 troops, police, and other emergency workers were sent to Saint Martin and Saint Barthélemy.

On both sides of Saint Martin, desperate conditions combined with food and water shortages in Irma's aftermath led to reports of violence, scavenging, and theft. In response, the French government increased its troop deployment to 2,200 and the Dutch government sent more than 600 military and police personnel.

The day after the hurricane hit Saint Barthelemy the French armed forces based in Guadeloupe and French Guiana flew equipment and troops into the reopened Grand Case-Espérance Airport. On September 7 and 9, equipment and personnel were flown from France to Guadeloupe and Martinique.
