= British Virgin Islands Financial Services Commission =

Financial supervisory authority of the BVI

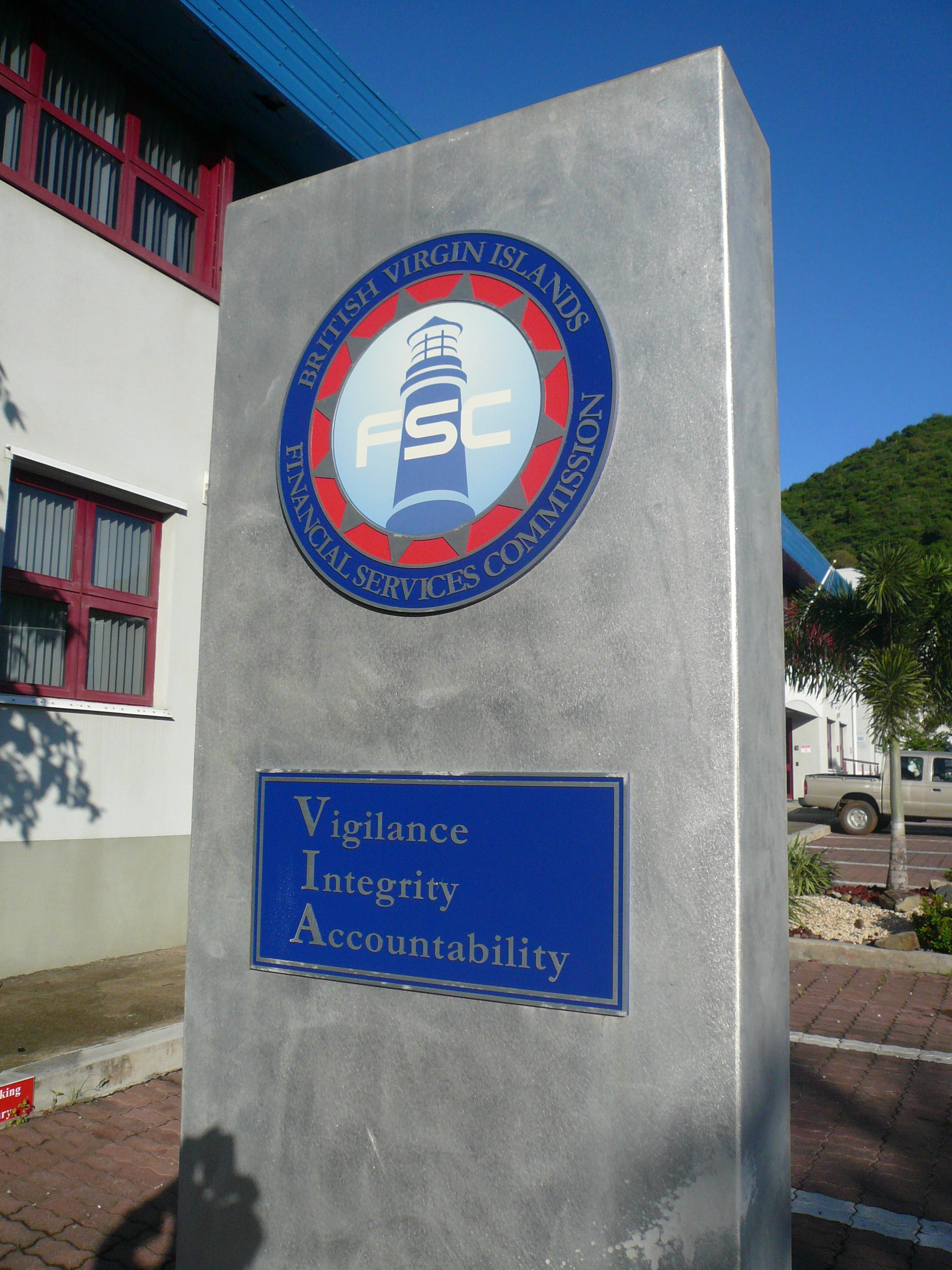
- outside the offices of the FSC

Agency overview
- Formed: December 2001
- Jurisdiction: British Virgin Islands
- Headquarters: Road Town, British Virgin Islands
- Agency executives: Mr Robin Gaul, Chairman; Mr Kenneth Baker, Managing Director/CEO
- Website: http://www.bvifsc.vg

The BVI Financial Services Commission is an autonomous regulatory authority responsible for the regulation, supervision and inspection of all the British Virgin Islands financial services including insurance, banking, trustee business, company management, mutual funds business, the registration of companies, limited partnerships and intellectual property.

It was established in 2001 pursuant to the Financial Services Commission Act, 2001. The commission now oversees all regulatory responsibilities previously handled by the government through its Financial Services Department; protecting the independence of financial services regulation and fulfilling international commitments to the prevention of international white collar crime while safeguarding the privacy and confidentiality of legitimate business transactions.

The commission also has new responsibilities including promoting public understanding of the financial system and its products, policing the perimeter of regulated activity, reducing financial crime and preventing market abuse.

The British Virgin Islands Financial Services Commission launched its Asia representative office in Hong Kong in April 2014 as part of a broader effort to support business development in the Asia Pacific Region.

== Governance ==
The Chairman of the Board of Commissioners is Mr Robin Gaul, who qualified as an accountant in the United Kingdom in 1967, was a partner of KPMG and had served on various boards and committees in the BVI public sector including the Development Bank of the Virgin Islands and the BVI Electricity Corporation. Mr Gaul was appointed as Deputy Chairman of the Inaugural Board of the Financial Services Commission in 2002 and chairman of the board in May, 2006.

The Managing Director/Chief Executive Officer of the Financial Services Commission is Robert Mathavious, who has held that position since the formation of the commission. Prior to that Mr Mathavious worked for 25 years as a civil servant. In 2013 he received an honorary doctorate from the University of the West Indies.

== See also ==
- List of company registers
- List of financial supervisory authorities by country
