= John Duncan (diplomat, born 1958) =

British diplomat (born 1958)

John Duncan OBE
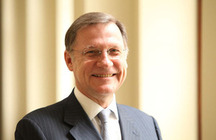

Governor of the British Virgin Islands
- In office 15 August 2014 – 8 August 2017
- Monarch: Elizabeth II
- Premier: Orlando Smith
- Preceded by: William Boyd McCleary
- Succeeded by: Augustus Jaspert

Personal details
- Born: 17 April 1958 (age 68)

Viceregal styles of John Duncan (2014-2017)
- Reference style: His Excellency
- Spoken style: Your Excellency

John Stewart Duncan OBE (born 17 April 1958) is a British diplomat. He was Ambassador for Multilateral Arms Control and Disarmament and UK Permanent Representative to the Conference on Disarmament, Geneva, 2006–11. In June 2013, he was appointed by Queen Elizabeth II on the advice of the British government, to represent the Queen as Governor of the British Virgin Islands, and to act as the de facto head of state in the Territory. Duncan arrived at the Islands on 14 August 2014 and was sworn in the following day and his term would last until 8 August 2017 when he was succeeded by Robert A. Mathavious.

== Career ==
John Stewart Duncan was educated at Wycliffe College, Paris-Sorbonne University, Keele University and the NATO Defence College. He joined the Foreign and Commonwealth Office (FCO) in 1980 and served in Paris and Khartoum and in various positions at the FCO before being posted to Tirana where he was chargé d'affaires 1992–1993 (the UK and Albania did not exchange ambassadors until 1996). Since then, Duncan has been a member of the UK delegation to NATO 1993–96, UK Political Adviser to SACEUR and Deputy SACEUR 1998–2001, director of the Paris office of UK Trade & Investment 2002–06, and Ambassador for Multilateral Arms Control and Disarmament and UK Permanent Representative to the Conference on Disarmament in Geneva 2006–11. He gave a keynote address at "Gov 2.0 L.A." in Los Angeles on 12 February 2011. He was British chief diplomat and Special Representative for a London Conference on Cyberspace held on 1 and 2 November 2011.

Preceded by William Boyd McCleary	Governor of the British Virgin Islands; 2014–2017	Succeeded by Augustus Jaspert
