= Augustus Jaspert =

Governor of British Virgin Islands from 2017 to 2021

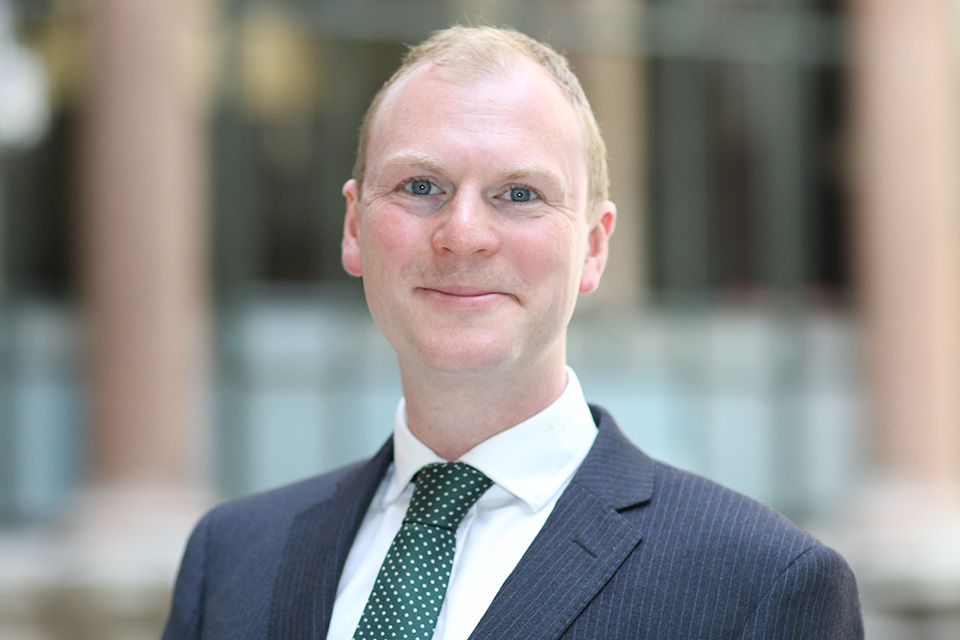

Governor of the British Virgin Islands
- In office 22 August 2017 – 23 January 2021
- Monarch: Elizabeth II
- Premier: Andrew Fahie; Orlando Smith
- Preceded by: John Duncan
- Succeeded by: John Rankin

Personal details
- Born: 1979 (age 46–47) Camden, London, England
- Spouse: Millie Jaspert (née Kilpatrick)
- Children: 2
- Education: University of Edinburgh (B.A., 2001); King's College London (M.A., 2015)

Viceregal styles of Augustus Jaspert (2017–2021)
- Reference style: His Excellency
- Spoken style: Your Excellency

Augustus James Ulysses "Gus" Jaspert (born 1979) is a British diplomat who was previously the Governor of the British Virgin Islands. He was sworn into office on 22 August 2017. He left office on 23 January 2021, and was succeeded by John Rankin who was sworn in after completing a 14-day COVID-19 quarantine.

As of March 2026 he is managing director of the Crown Estate's Marine business.

== Career and background ==
From 2001 to 2007 Jaspert worked for Surrey County Council as Lead Manager for Children's Services. He then spent two years at HM Treasury as part of the Prime Minister's Delivery Unit, followed by three years at the Home Office as Head of Drugs and Alcohol and Head of Policing. From 2012 to 2014 he worked at 10 Downing Street as Private Secretary to the Prime Minister, David Cameron, after which he spent a year studying at the Royal College of Defence Studies, an institution which grooms public servants who "have the potential to reach the highest ranks". He then spent two years in the Cabinet Office as Director of Security and Intelligence, National Security Secretariat, before taking up appointment as Governor of the British Virgin Islands.

He graduated with a first class degree in History and German from the University of Edinburgh in 2001, and in 2015 was awarded a master's degree with distinction in International Security and Strategy from King's College London.

== Governor of the British Virgin Islands ==
Shortly after being sworn into office as Governor, the British Virgin Islands was struck by Hurricane Irma. Jaspert declared a state of emergency 16 days after being sworn in, thus becoming the first ever Governor of the British Virgin Islands to exercise that power under the Constitution. Governor Jaspert was widely praised for his quick response which possibly saved the territory.

In 2021, Jaspert launched a corruption inquiry in the Territory shortly before demitting office, appointing Sir Gary Hickinbottom as commissioner. In April 2022, the Commission of Inquiry was published, concluding that governance in the Territory had been "appallingly bad", and that it was "highly likely" that serious dishonesty had taken place. It concluded that the constitution should be suspended and its government dissolved – returning direct rule from London. The British government subsequently decided it would not suspend the Territory's constitution, despite the recommendation.

Jaspert had been criticised and defamed in one Government-linked online news site for launching the corruption inquiry, yet the findings of the report confirmed Jaspert had been correct.

In April 2022, Premier of the British Virgin Islands Andrew Fahie was arrested in the United States on charges related to drug trafficking and money laundering – he was removed as Premier shortly afterwards. He was convicted of all charges on 8 February 2024.

== Footnotes ==
| Preceded by John Duncan | Governor of the British Virgin Islands; 2017–2021 | Succeeded by John Rankin (diplomat) |
