= 2025 in the British Virgin Islands =

- Decades
- See also: Other events of 2025; Timeline of BVI history

Events from the year 2025 in the British Virgin Islands.

== Incumbents ==
- Governor: Daniel Pruce
- Premier: Natalio Wheatley

== Holidays ==
- 1 January – New Year's Day
- 3 March – Lavity Stoutt's Birthday (In lieu of 7 March)
- 18 April – Good Friday
- 21 April – Easter Monday
- 9 June – Whit Monday
- 13 June – Sovereign's Birthday
- 7 July – Virgin Islands Day
- 4–6 August – Emancipation Day
- 20 October – Saint Ursula's Day (Heroes and Fore-parents Day)
- 24 November – The Commemoration of the Great March 1949 and the Restoration of the Legislative Council
- 25 December – Christmas Day
- 26 December – Boxing Day
