= List of newspapers in the British Virgin Islands =

This is a list of newspapers in the British Virgin Islands.

== Official ==
- The Virgin Islands Official Gazette

== Daily newspapers ==
- There are none, although The Virgin Islands Daily News from the neighbouring U.S. Virgin Islands has a moderate circulation in the British Virgin Islands.

== Weekly newspapers ==
- BVI Beacon
- The Island Sun

== Defunct newspapers ==
- The BVI Standpoint

== See also ==
- British Virgin Islands news websites
