= 2021 in the British Virgin Islands =

- Decades
- See also: Other events of 2021; Timeline of BVI history

Events from the year 2021 in the British Virgin Islands.

== Incumbents ==
- Governor:
  - Until 23 January Augustus Jaspert
  - 23 January - 29 January David Archer (acting)
  - From 29 January John Rankin
- Premier: Andrew Fahie

== Events ==
=== January ===
- 12 January – The UK Government announces that it is withdrawing funding from the British Virgin Islands' Recovery and Development Agency.
- 18 January – The Governor establishes a Commission of Inquiry to "look into whether corruption, abuse of office or other serious dishonesty in relation to officials — elected, statutory or public — may have taken place in recent years. If so, it will consider the conditions which allowed this to take place and make independent recommendations for improvement." The Commission is to be led by retired English Court of Appeal judge, Sir Gary Hickinbottom.

=== February ===
- 9 February – Earl "Bob" Hodge is shot and killed. The United States had made repeated, unsuccessful attempts to extradite Hodge on allegations of cocaine trafficking.
- 24 February – The Premier announces the formation of a Constitutional Review Commission in relation to the Constitution of the British Virgin Islands.

=== May ===
- 4 May – The Commission of Inquiry into the Government, led by Sir Gary Hickinbottom, begins its hearings.

=== July ===
- 2 July – The British Virgin Islands records its second death from COVID-19.

=== August ===
- 6 August – The British Virgin Islands' COVID-19 death toll climbs to 37.

=== October ===
- 22 October – The evidence-gathering stage of the Commission of Inquiry concludes.
- 28 October – The Government proposes a motion in the House of Assembly that the financial burden of a costs order against the Speaker of the House be met from public funds.
- 29 October – An online petition criticising the government's decision to pay the legal costs of the Speaker of the House in relation to a failed injunction application receives over 1,000 signatures in the first 24 hours.

== See also ==
- 2021 in the Caribbean
