= 2020 in the British Virgin Islands =

- Decades
- See also: Other events of 2020; Timeline of BVI history

Events from the year 2020 in the British Virgin Islands.

== Incumbents ==
- Governor: Augustus Jaspert
- Premier: Andrew Fahie

== Events ==
=== January ===
- 20 January - House of Assembly representative for the 6th District, Alvera Maduro-Caines "crosses the floor", leaving the opposition NDP to join the ruling VIP. Politicians crossing the floor is relatively common in the Territory.

=== March ===
- 25 March - The British Virgin Islands confirmed its first two cases of COVID-19. One was a visitor from Europe and one was a visitor from New York.

=== April ===
- 5 April - The Territory implements a 24 hour per day lockdown for a period of 14 days due to the 2020 coronavirus pandemic in the British Virgin Islands.
- 18 April
  - The Territory suffers its first death from COVID-19.
  - The Territory imposes a 7% tax on all money transfer services out of the Territory.
- 19 April - The Territory-wide 24 hour lockdown is extended by seven days.

=== May ===
- 24 May - Former first lady, Idris O'Neal OBE (wife of Ralph O'Neal) dies.
- 26 May - Health Authorities announce that there are now zero confirmed cases of Covid-19 in the Territory, but warned that the fight against the virus is "not over".

=== June ===
- 3 June - The report of the Auditor General in relation to the Government's controversial investment in BVI Airways is published.
- 8 June – An American commercial fisherman is arrested for illegal entry, unregistered and unlicensed fishing, and failure to arrive at a customs port.
- 15 June - Controversy arises as a local media outlet publishes a cartoon of Governor Augustus Jaspert standing on the neck of a local media personality, in imitation of the murder of George Floyd.

=== August ===
- 3 August - Government issues a directive barring work permit holders and work permit exempt persons from returning to the Territory indefinitely.
- 14 August - Curfew relating to Covid-19 pandemic ends after five months.
- 21 August
  - Gambling laws are liberalised in the Territory pursuant to the new Gaming and Betting Control Act 2020.
  - Nine new cases of Covid-19 diagnosed, leading the Government to reimpose curfew restrictions. The rise in infections was blamed by the Government on people re-entering the Territory illegally from the neighbouring U.S. Virgin Islands to evade mandatory quarantine restrictions.

=== September ===
- 21 September - Government announces a proposed 1 December re-opening of the Territory for tourist visitors.
- 22 September - Government announces its commitment to "implementing publicly accessible registers of company beneficial ownership" for the Territory.

=== October ===
- 8 October - Government warns the public of an apparent Dengue fever outbreak in the Territory.

=== November ===
- 6 November - A man is shot dead in the Baugher's Bay area of Tortola.
- 10 November - A serving police officer is arrested in the largest drugs bust in the Territory's history - around 2,300 kilogrammes.

== Deaths ==
- 24 May - Idris O'Neal OBE (wife of Ralph O'Neal)

== See also ==
- 2020 in the Caribbean
