= 2024 in the British Virgin Islands =

- Decades
- See also: Other events of 2024; Timeline of BVI history

Events from the year 2024 in the British Virgin Islands.

== Incumbents ==
- Governor:
  - John Rankin (Till 18 January)
  - Daniel Pruce (From 29 January)
- Premier: Natalio Wheatley

== Events ==
=== January ===
- 14 January - Former Health Secretary, Carvin Malone, who led the Territory through the Covid-19 pandemic dies.
- 25 January - The Virgin Islands Deposit Insurance Corporation, providing a government backed guarantee for bank deposits in the Territory.
- 29 January - The trial of former Premier Andrew Fahie on money laundering and drug trafficking charges begins.

=== February ===
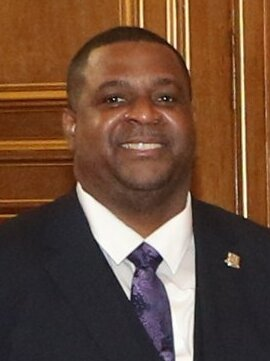
Andrew Fahie.

- 8 February - Former Premier Andrew Fahie is convicted by a Miami jury on all counts in relation to charges of conspiracy to import cocaine.

=== August ===
- 14 August - Tropical Storm Ernesto strikes the Territory, causing flooding.

=== October ===
- 23 October - Premier Natalio Wheatley fires Deputy Premier and coalition partner Lorna Smith, and replaces her with Julian Fraser in both capacities.

== Deaths ==
- 14 January - Carvin Malone, former politician.

== Holidays ==
- 1 January – New Year's Day
- 7 March – Lavity Stoutt's Birthday
- 29 March – Good Friday
- 1 April – Easter Monday
- 20 May – Whit Monday
- 14 June – Sovereign's Birthday
- 1 July – Virgin Islands Day
- 5 August – Emancipation Day
- 21 October – Saint Ursula's Day
- 25 November – The 1949 Great March and Restoration Day
- 25 December – Christmas Day
- 26 December – Boxing Day
