= Government House, British Virgin Islands =

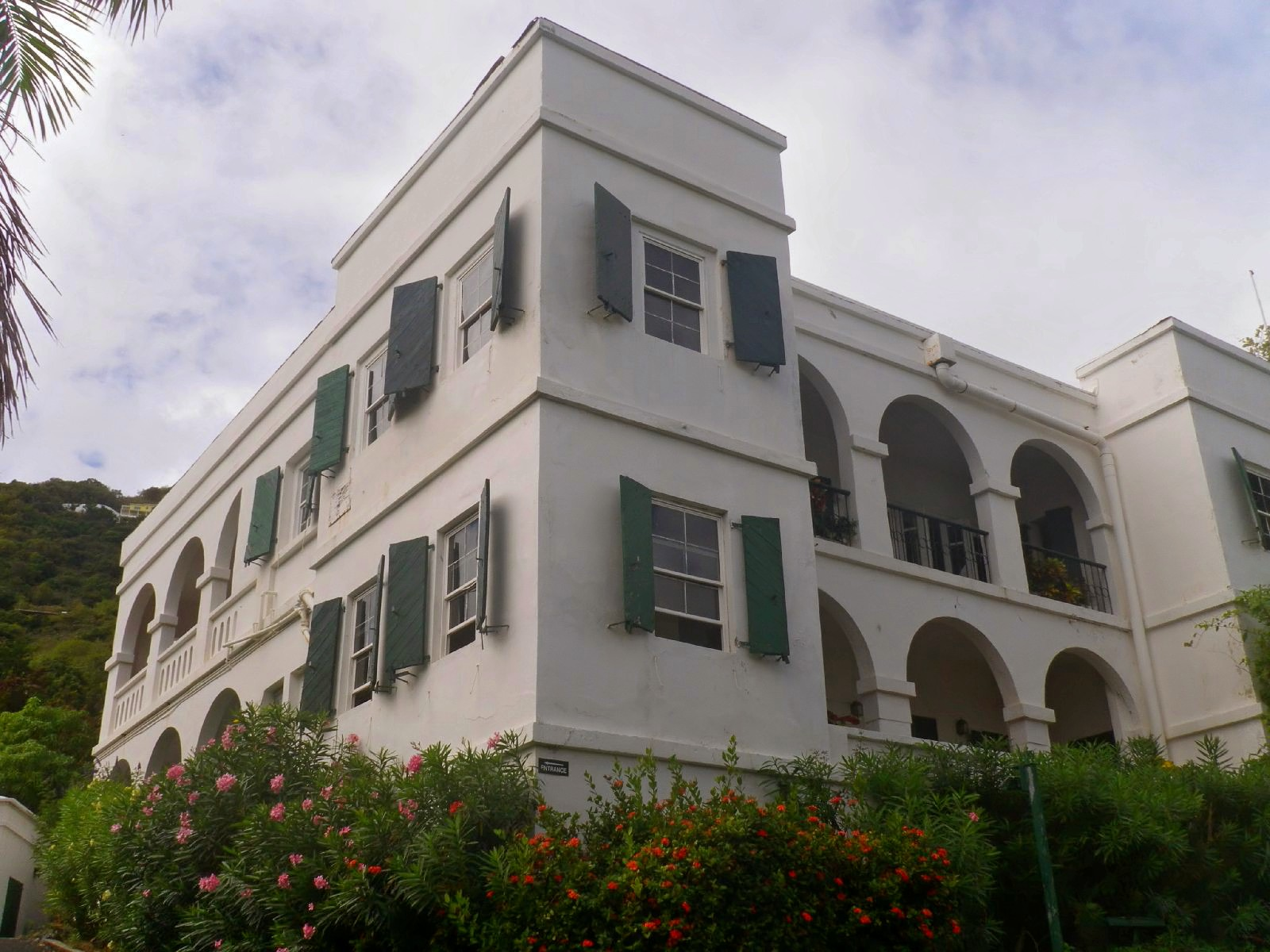
Old Government House, Road Town, Tortola

Government House, located in Road Town, Tortola, is the official residence of the governor of the British Virgin Islands. There have been several structures built on the same site, with the original dating back to 1889. The current residence was built in 2003 on an adjacent site, with the previous building adapted into a museum.

== History ==
The original structure, dating back to 1899, was destroyed by a hurricane in 1924. The present structure was built on the same site in 1925-26 and was the home of commissioners, presidents, administrators and governors until 1999, when it was deemed unsuitable. The Island Sun published an editorial against the demolition of the historic building and members of the public expressed their disagreement with the official decision. In 2003, a new Government House was built on adjacent land while the old structure has been transformed into a museum.

In November 2003, Governor Thomas Macan moved into the new residence located at Tortola. The project included the construction of the new Government House and a reception hall, as well as the restoration of the old Government House, which is now a museum. The structure was built by Meridian Construction and designed by OBM and FCO Estates.

The house is currently occupied by Governor Daniel Pruce.

== Royal visits ==
Government House was visited by Queen Elizabeth II in 1966, and again, accompanied by Prince Philip in 1977. Prince Philip returned to the British Virgin Islands aboard the Royal Yacht Britannia in 1993, and again paid a visit to Government House. Additionally, Princess Margaret stayed at Government House for five days as part of a state visit in 1972.

== See also ==
- Governor of the British Virgin Islands
- Government Houses of the British Empire
