= 2022 in the British Virgin Islands =

- Decades
- See also: Other events of 2022; Timeline of BVI history

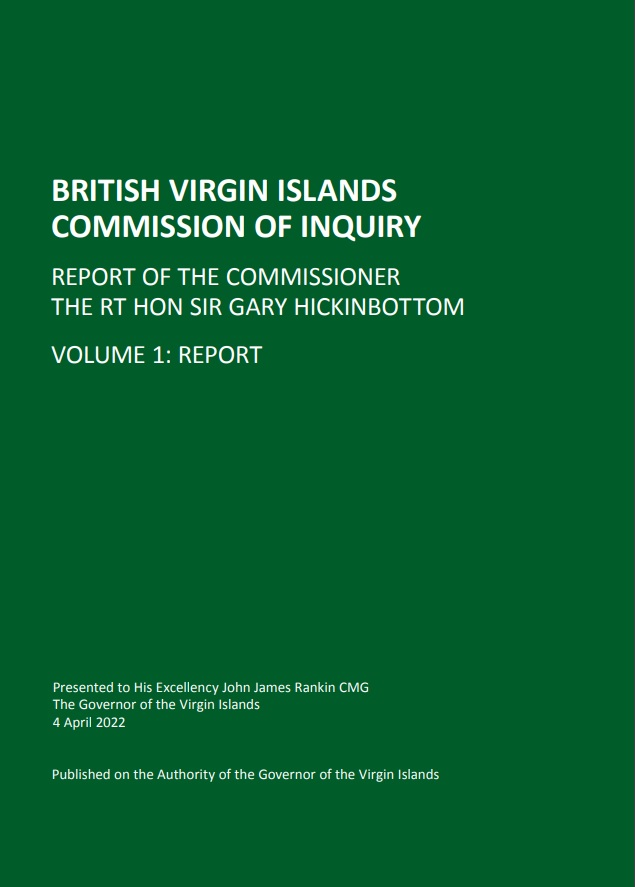
BVI Commission of Inquiry Report (vol 1)

Events from the year 2022 in the British Virgin Islands.

== Incumbents ==
- Governor: John Rankin
- Premier
  - Andrew Fahie (until 5 May)
  - Natalio Wheatley (from 5 May)

== Events ==
=== January ===
- 18 January - the Territory reports five deaths in a period of three days due to the Omicron variant of COVID-19. This brings the Territory's total death toll due to COVID-19 up to 47.

=== February ===
- 1 February - the Territory reports its 50th death due to the COVID-19 pandemic.

=== March ===
- 28 March - Premier Andrew Fahie confirms that the Territory has spent approximately $5 million on the Commission of Inquiry. This followed earlier refusals to confirm how much money had been spent on legal fees.
- 31 March - The Government indicated that there was "no timeline" for lifting COVID-19 restrictions for people arriving into the Territory.

=== April ===
- 4 April - Governor John Rankin receives the Commission of Inquiry report from Sir Gary Hickinbottom. He indicated an intention to review the report in full before publishing it - probably in June.
- 28 April - Premier Andrew Fahie and two others are detained in Miami on charges of conspiracy to import cocaine and money laundering. The arrests were reported to follow a "sting operation" by the US Drug Enforcement Administration.
- 29 April - The Commission of Inquiry report is published. It described the state of governance in the British Virgin Islands as "appallingly bad" and recommended suspension of the constitution and that the United Kingdom reintroduce direct rule for an initial period of up to two years. Acting Premier Natalio Wheatley issued a statement saying he was "very concerned" by the recommendations.

=== May ===
- 5 May - Andrew Fahie is removed as Premier and Natalio Wheatley is appointed in his stead. A new 'unity' government is sworn in, bringing Marlon Penn and "Mitch" Turnbull into the Cabinet. Julian Fraser is appointed Leader of the Opposition as the only elected representative who is not either in the VIP, the NDP or Cabinet.
- 27 May - It is reported that the BVI Government spent over $8 million in relation to the Commission of Inquiry, significantly more than the original $5 million government allocation. In a separate development, it was disclosed that the law firm acting for then-speaker Julian Willock who had sought to obstruct the commission by injuncting its lawyers was acting on instructions received from then-Premier, Andrew Fahie.

=== June ===
- 8 June - The British government announces it will not suspend the Territory's constitution as recommended by the Commission of Inquiry report. The governor announced that the new "unity government" would be given time to enact reforms.
- 13 June - Former Premier Andrew Fahie is reportedly released on bail following his arrest on drug charges in the United States.
- 15 June
  - The Territory ends its COVID-19 mandatory isolation rules and "mask mandate" in public places.
  - Former Minister of Health and Social Development Carvin Malone announced he was leaving the "unity government" and the Virgin Islands Party to join the opposition. Prior to Malone's decision the opposition in the House of Assembly consisted of just one person.

=== November ===
- 1 November - Former Minister of Education, Myron Walwyn, was arrested and charged with breach of trust by a public officer in relation the controversial High School perimeter wall project.

=== December ===
- 19 December - It is announced that the BVI will hold a referendum on whether same-sex marriage should be legalised. It would be the first referendum ever held in the Territory.

== See also ==
- 2022 in the Caribbean
