= 2023 in the British Virgin Islands =

- Decades
- See also: Other events of 2023; Timeline of BVI history

Events from the year 2023 in the British Virgin Islands.

== Incumbents ==
- Governor: John Rankin
- Premier: Natalio Wheatley

== Events ==
=== January ===
- 10 January - Former Speaker of the House of Assembly, Julian Willock, is reportedly arrested and then released in relation to suspicions of human trafficking. Through a statement released on an affiliated news website, Willock strenuously denied the allegations, and referred to them as "unfounded". Willock had previously resigned as speaker under pressure from his party in May 2022.

=== April ===
- 24 April - 2023 British Virgin Islands general election: Citizens of the British Virgin Islands elect the 13 members of the House of Assembly. No party won an overall majority but the incumbent Virgin Islands Party (VIP) won the most seats. Discussions to form a coalition ensued.
- 25 April - In a surprise move, Lorna Smith (wife of longtime National Democratic Party leader, Orlando Smith) switched allegiance to the VIP allowing them to form a government. Lorna Smith was made Deputy Premier.
- 27 April - The new Cabinet was announced. For the first time it included a new Ministerial position for financial services.

=== July ===
- 1 July - an armed robbery takes place during broad daylight at the Tortola Pier Park, a key tourist location.

=== October ===
- 3-4 October - Tropical Storm Philippe brings widescale flooding to the Territory, despite passing nearly 90 nautical miles to the north.
- 9 October - Unknown assailants opened fire on a prison van, reportedly to try and free a prisoner. One guard was injured.

== See also ==
- 2023 in the Caribbean
