= British Virgin Islands 2021 Commission of Inquiry =

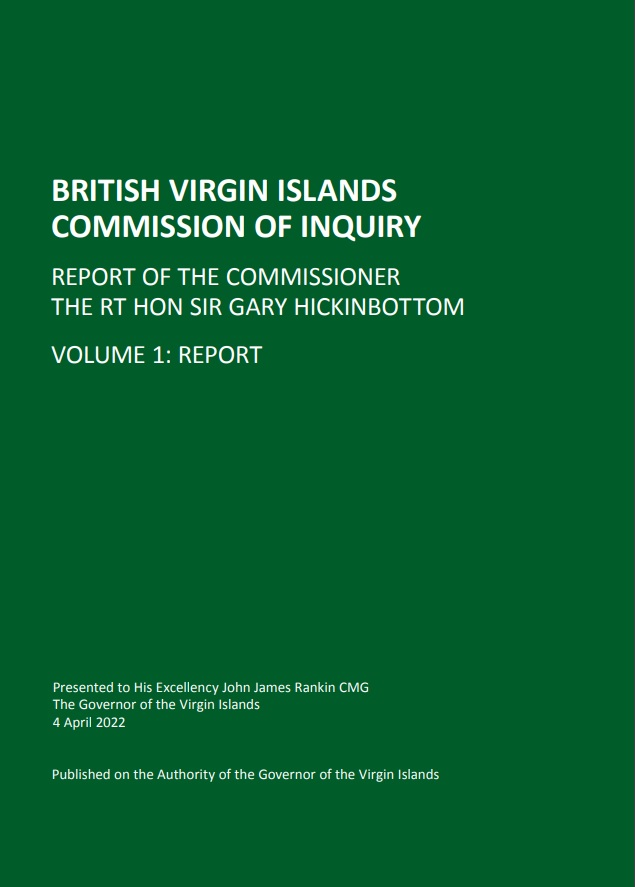
BVI Commission of Inquiry Report (vol 1)

The British Virgin Islands 2021 Commission of Inquiry was a public inquiry commissioned by the then Governor of the British Virgin Islands, Augustus Jaspert. The terms of reference were to make "a full, faithful and impartial inquiry into whether there was information that corruption, abuse of office or other serious dishonesty in relation to officials, whether statutory, elected or public, may have taken place in recent years; if there were such information, to consider the conditions which allowed such conduct to take place and whether they may still exist; and, if appropriate, to make independent recommendations with a view to improving the standards of governance and the operation of the agencies of law enforcement and justice in the Territory".

A former judge of the English Court of Appeal, Sir Gary Hickinbottom was appointed as the commissioner. The hearings and taking of evidence were conducted over several months in 2021 in different sittings, and the report was finally delivered on 4 April 2022 to Mr Jaspert's successor as Governor, John Rankin. After the Governor reviewed it privately it was published on 29 April 2022.

The report was 946 pages long (including appendices), and concluded that "[a]lmost everywhere, the principles of good governance, such as openness, transparency and even the rule of law, are ignored". He described the governance as "appallingly bad", and that it was "highly likely" that serious dishonesty had taken place. The report also noted that various civil servants in the British Virgin Islands, including the Auditor General and the Director of Internal Audit had repeatedly drawn attention to these matters in a way that was "brave, forthright and clear" but that "they have been consistently ignored". He expressed the view that "the people of the BVI have been badly served in recent years. Very badly indeed", and that "the people of the BVI deserve better ... [and] the UK Government owes them an obligation not only to protect them from such abuses but to assist them to achieve their aspirations for self government as a modern democratic state".

The report made a total of 49 recommendations, including four overarching recommendations. Most significantly amongst them, the report recommended that the Territory's Constitution be suspended and reviewed, and that the United Kingdom should reimpose direct rule over the islands for an initial period of up to two years. The UK Foreign Secretary, Liz Truss, dispatched Overseas Minister Amanda Milling to the British Virgin Islands for urgent talks as a result. The report recommended that direct rule be conducted in conjunction with an 'Advisory Council' of people from the Territory, referring to the "huge pool of talent and wisdom in the BVI".

In an apparently unrelated incident, after the inquiry concluded and the report had been delivered, but before it was published, the Premier, Andrew Fahie, was arrested in Miami relating to charges of conspiracy to import drugs and money laundering.

Acting Premier Natalio Wheatley issued a statement saying he was "very concerned" by the recommendations, and later confirmed that direct rule was "not acceptable". On 8 June 2022, subordinate UK legislation was made allowing for direct rule for the islands. However, the British government confirmed on that date that it would not in fact suspend the Territory's constitution, despite the recommendation by the Commission of Inquiry.

== Background ==
In October 2017 Augustus Jaspert was appointed as Governor of the British Virgin Islands, and just over a year afterwards Andrew Fahie's Virgin Islands Party (VIP) won a general election and formed a government. From a relatively early stage there were reports of hostility between the two men. Although the VIP ran on an anti-corruption platform, the Governor continued to express concerns and reservations about governance and transparency. Andrew Fahie firmly blamed the personal relationship for the decision to appoint a commission of inquiry. Jaspert did not respond to those specific allegations, but did speak warmly of the wider people of the BVI, saying that the "values of integrity, honesty and respect run deep in the BVI" and "We have an excellent financial services industry that is known worldwide for its strong regulations. We are one of the safest places in the Caribbean to come and visit and live and I don't want anything to jeopardise that". Later, in his own evidence before the inquiry, Jaspert indicated that he felt: "the Premier had behaved on more than one occasion was not “befitting of a professional or courteous manner from an elected leader of government”."

In 2021, shortly before his term as Governor ended, Jaspert used his powers to order a commission of inquiry into allegations of impropriety. The announcement was made by the Governor via Facebook on 18 January 2021.

Some of these allegations related to specific incidents of impropriety which had been well documented in the press, such as the BVI Airways fiasco, and the contracts for the building of the wall for the Elmore Stoutt High School in Road Town. But other allegations related to a more general culture of impunity and disregard for processes and procedures. He also subsequently intimated concerns about links between the governments and drug gangs.

== Response of the BVI Government ==
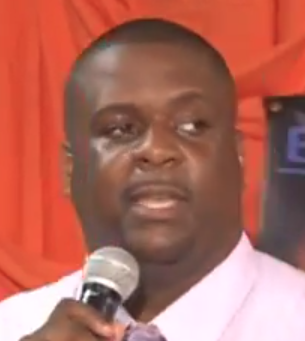
Andrew Fahie

The approach of the British Virgin Islands government to the commission was hostile from the outset. Sir Gary Hickinbottom noted that disclosure of government papers was "in shambolic order, and often incomplete". The British Virgin Islands government retained former Attorney General for England and Wales, Sir Geoffrey Cox QC, to represent them at the inquiry. In order to retain their lawyers the BVI government waived the tender process. The Premier later estimated that $5 million of taxpayer money had spent on the government's defence. In his report Sir Gary noted that although the various lawyers were theoretically retained to act for "the government" as a whole, the reality was that it was "impossible to avoid the conclusion that the primary role of Withers was to defend the interests of the elected Ministers, which was vigorously and fully done."

The Speaker of the House, Julian Willock, also attempted to obtain an injunction privately against the commission's attorneys from acting in the Territory. That claim was struck out and Willock was ordered to pay costs, but the government indicated that it would indemnify him from public funds prompting public protests.

When the Commission wrote to each sitting member of the House of Assembly with an open invitation to provide the commission with any information and documents which they had in their possession or control and which might be relevant: "No substantive response was received: none of the Ministers or other Members provided any documents or other information pursuant to the request."

The inquiry itself was also plagued with leaks on news website Virgin Islands News Online (VINO), a local news website associated with Julian Willock.

== Hearings ==
Hearings commenced on 22 January 2021 at the International Arbitration Centre in Road Town, Tortola. The hearings took over 50 days in total over a period of six months. The hearings were live streamed. The hearings were extended on a number of occasions due to the COVID-19 pandemic and to allow further evidence to be taken.

The hearings were conducted in two main phases: firstly from 4 May to 19 July 2021 (days 1 to 28), and secondly from 6 September to 24 November 2021 (days 29 to 55). The evidence gathering concluded on 22 October 2021, although a number of procedural matters and applications were resolved after that date.

In his report, Sir Gary noted "One substantial challenge was that some individuals who had information to divulge, expressed fear of discrimination or other forms of reprisal if they were seen to be assisting or even communicating with the COI."

He also noted that, despite public perceptions: "It was never intended that the COI would conduct in depth financial investigations into particular projects, programmes or people; or “chase” bad money. The Terms of Reference did not require or expect it, and the time and resources I had were tailored accordingly."

== Report ==
The report was delivered to the Governor of the British Virgin Islands, John Rankin, on 4 April 2022. After the Governor reviewed it privately it was published on 29 April 2022. The Governor indicated that the subsequent arrest of Andrew Fahie in Miami caused him to accelerate the publication of the report to try to avoid any suggestion that the two matters were somehow connected.

The report was strongly critical of successive government administrations in the Territory. The report indicated that "[a]lmost everywhere, the principles of good governance, such as openness, transparency and even the rule of law, are ignored". He described the governance as "appallingly bad", and that it was "highly likely" that serious dishonesty had taken place. The report also noted that various civil servants in the British Virgin Islands, including the Auditor General and the Director of Internal Audit had repeatedly drawn attention to these matters in a way that was "brave, forthright and clear" but that "they have been consistently ignored".

=== Recommendations ===
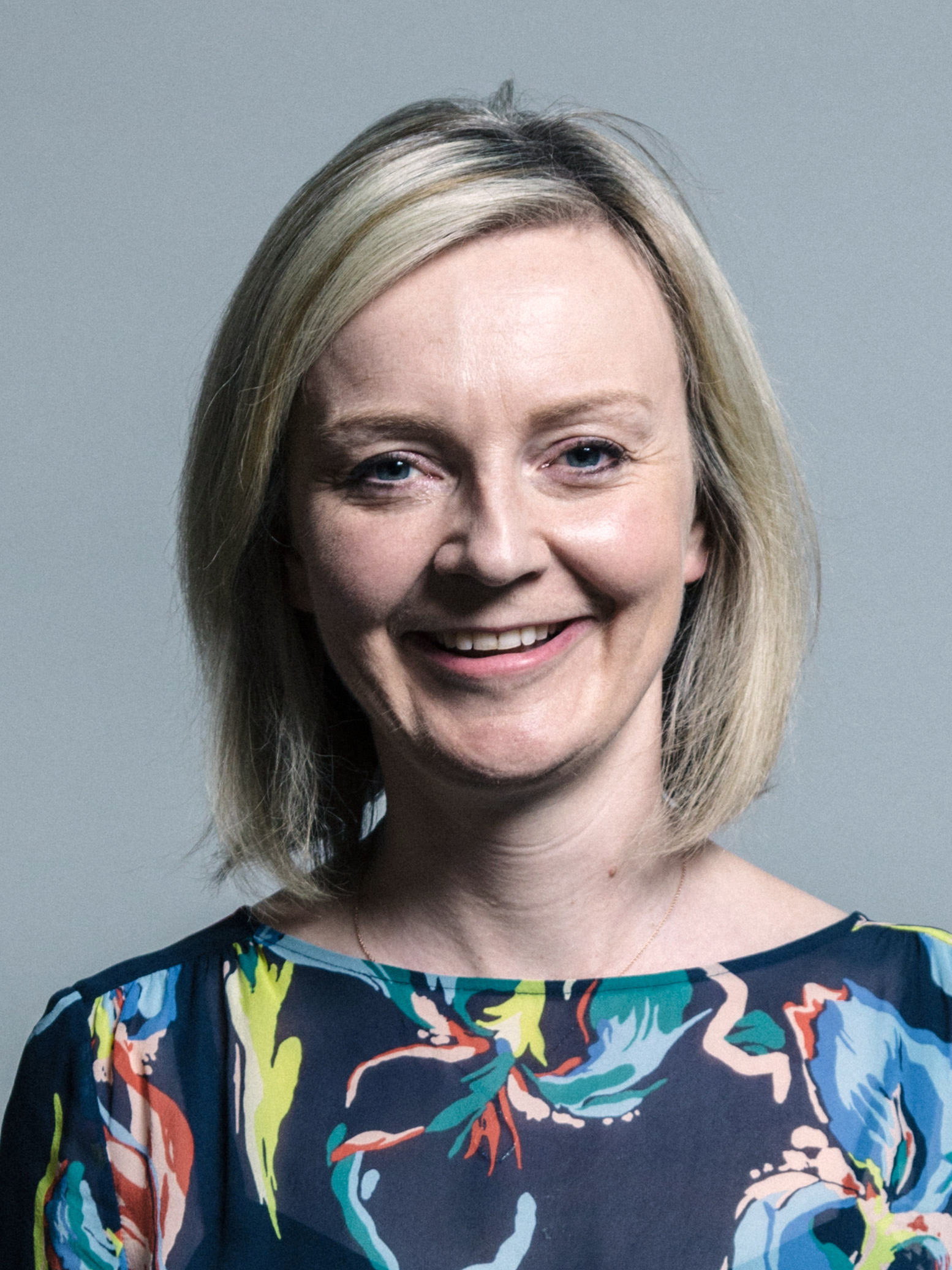
Liz Truss

The report made four overarching recommendations, followed by 45 further recommendations. The overarching recommendations were:

- A1. Temporary Partial Suspension of the Constitution. "I recommend partial suspension of the Constitution, by the dissolution of the House of Assembly, the cessation of ministerial government and necessary consequential suspension of provisions of the Constitution, for an initial period of two years." In his introductory remarks, Sir Gary had said that he made that recommendation "with a particularly heavy heart". He made the recommendation in forceful terms (emphasis original):

...whilst I appreciate that the Governor and the UK Government will consider this only as a last resort, as do I, I have concluded that the only way – and I stress, the only way – in which the relevant issues can be addressed is for there to be a temporary suspension of those parts of the Constitution by which areas of government are assigned to elected representatives. It is only with the most anxious consideration that I have been driven to the conclusion that such a suspension is not only warranted but essential, if the abuses which I have identified – which are abuses against the people of the BVI – are to be tackled and brought to an end.

- A2. Constitutional Review. "I recommend that there be an early and speedy review of the Constitution, with the purpose of ensuring that abuses of the type I have identified do not recur, and establishing a Constitution that will enable the people of the BVI to meet their aspirations, including those in respect of self-government within the context of modern democracy ... The Constitutional Review I propose must be broad."
- A3. Curtailment of Open-Ended Discretion. "I recommend that there be a review of discretionary powers held by elected public officials (including Cabinet), with a view to removing the powers where they are unnecessary; or, where they are considered necessary, ensuring that they are exercised in accordance with clearly expressed and published guidelines."
- A4. Audits and Investigations. Sir Gary made a number of recommendations for audits and investigations in relation to matters that came before the inquiry, including a recommendation for "the Auditor General, together with other independent persons or bodies instructed by her to assist, as soon as possible, initiate a review of all areas of government". He also recommended "the Governor establishes one or more independent unit(s) to conduct investigations into projects and/or individuals as identified by the unit(s), taking into account the information in this Report, the audits that have been and will be conducted by the Auditor General and Internal Audit Department and, of course, information and intelligence that the unit(s) themselves gather. The unit(s) should also be responsible for taking steps to secure money, land or other assets pending criminal and/or civil confiscation and/or recovery proceedings, if appropriate."

The remaining recommendations fell into several broad headings:

- B5. Commission of Inquiry. He recommended reform of the existing law based upon his experiences to assist any future inquiries.
- B2-B6. Elected officials interests. He made a number of recommendations around public registers of interests, and greater clarity around rules relating to members' private interests.
- B7-B17. Assistance Grants. "I recommend that there should be a wholesale review of the BVI welfare benefits and grants system, including House of Assembly Members’ Assistance Grants and Government Ministries’ Assistance Grants."
- B18-B23. Contracts. "I recommend all contracts in respect of major projects (i.e. projects valued at over $100,000, even if they have been the subject of contract splitting or sequential contracts) considered by Cabinet (or, if not considered by Cabinet, considered and approved by a Minister) over the last three years should be the subject of a full audit performed by the Auditor General or some other independent person or body instructed by her".
- B24-B29. Statutory Boards. The Report made a number of recommendations to improve the strength, integrity and independence of statutory boards.
- B30-B32. Disposals of Crown Land.
- B33-B34. Residence and Belonger Status. "I recommend that there should be a review of processes for the grant of residency and belongership status, and in particular the open discretion currently held by Cabinet to make grants."
- B35-B37. Public Service.
- B38-B44. Law Enforcement and Justice. "I recommend that there is a review of the law enforcement and justice systems, to include not only the front-line agencies (such as the Royal Virgin Islands Police Force, the Financial Investigation Agency, HM Customs and the Immigration Department, insofar as the last two mentioned are involved in the law enforcement system), but also the Prison Service and the Office of the Director of Public Prosecutions. Consideration should be given as to whether it should also cover the whole or parts of the Attorney General's Chambers and/or the courts". He also recommended revising the Jury Act (Cap 36) to widen the pool of potential jurors, and to make it easier to hold "judge only" trials.
- B45. Governance and Serious Dishonesty in Public Office "I recommend that the Complaints Commissioner be required to report annually to the Governor, Deputy Governor and the House of Assembly/Standing Finance Committee of the House of Assembly, setting out the extent to which there has been a response to her criticisms and recommendations."

=== Evidence and findings ===
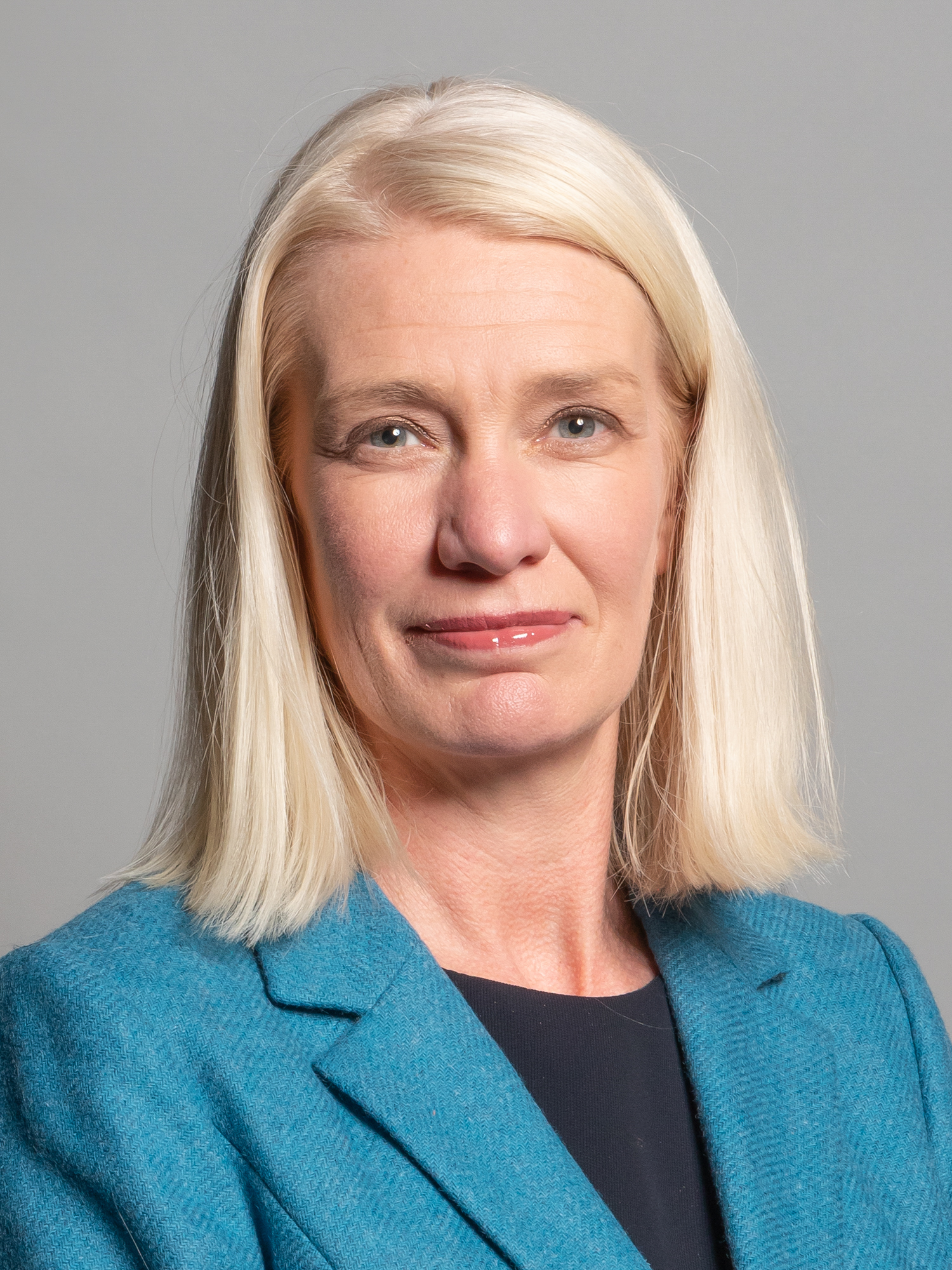
Amanda Milling

The commission made a wide range of findings based upon the evidence presented. These findings included:

- Register of Interests. The report found that "nearly all of the current and former Members had failed to comply with their constitutional and statutory obligations to file declarations in relation to their interests, and, more broadly, it painted a picture of general disregard of these obligations". He noted that this was in clear violation of the Register of Interests Act 2006. The report sets out a table listing breaches which runs to nine pages. He concluded "Registration of interests provides a very good example of where elected public officials have deliberately and persistently overridden constitutional controls on their behaviour. This has not simply been a case of elected officials failing to comply with their individual obligations. Collectively, they have deliberately, persistently and successfully undermined the system of controls imposed by the Constitution and statute, to the extent that the controls have been effectively "spiked" for more than two decades."
- Assistance Grants. The report indicated "On the basis of the evidence, assistance grants are distributed by Members of the House of Assembly in a legally arbitrary and unlawful manner", and "it is open to me to find (and I am driven by the evidence to find) that, in relation to these assistance grants, there is information before me that corruption, abuse of office or other serious dishonesty, in relation to elected public officials, may have taken place in recent years". He made identical findings relating to evidence of corruption and serious dishonest in relation to Ministerial grants and in relation to COVID-19 relief grants.
- Farmers & Fisherfolk grants. Sir Gary outlined much evidence of abuse of this programme. He referred to one example where a farmer applied for a grant for a weed eating machine in the sum of $285.99, which was increased to $4,085.99, and applicant eventually received a total of $13,500, and numerous similar examples of rapid inflation of claims of payments. He also referred to the complete lack of transparency and the probability of dishonesty and fraud.
- Obstruction. He concluded that the Chair of the Premier's Committee "took a deliberate decision" not to cooperate with the Auditor General to obstruct her work. This included demanding that all requests for information went through her, and then not responding to them for more than a year, and, in instances, specifically giving instructions that information should not be provided. He indicated that "consideration should be given by the appropriate authority (namely, the Governor) as to whether an investigation should be held into the conduct of the Premier's Office in obstructing the Auditor General in the way described above".
- Petty Contracts. The Commission reviewed a raft of public contracts going back to 1998 (Little A Racetrack) and 2003 (Beef Island Bridge), and noted the rapid inflation of costs in many of these. The Beef Island Bridge was originally tendered at $2.37 million, and ended up costing $8.3 million. He noted for the Sea Cow Bay Harbour Project a total of $1,157,088 in public money was spent before the project was abandoned with zero public benefit.
- High School Wall. The report indicated "The way in which the School Wall Project was contracted and implemented was, on any view, extraordinary. The construction of a single wall involved 70 different contractors, the majority of whom had no constructor's trade licence, in circumstances which disregarded the increased costs and complexity that the use of multiple contractors would inevitably entail, which would inevitably put at risk any desire to get the works completed at speed, as those involved including the Minister Hon Myron Walwyn well knew." And: "Mr Walwyn has failed to provide any satisfactory explanation for the quite extraordinary course he adopted, knowing that it would cause expenditure of public money in excess of that needed to individuals with the right to vote. It was, in fact, shortly before an election had to be called."
- BVI Airways. The Commission noted that former Premier Orlando Smith and Financial Secretary denied poor governance in relation to the project. He responded: "I simply cannot accept the assertion that the BVI Airways project was an example of good governance or, indeed, anything less than shockingly poor governance" and it was "an example of extremely poor governance with dire financial consequences for the BVI Government".
- Claude Skelton Cline. The Commission reviewed various contracts signed by the government with Pastor Cline, noting "There has been considerable public speculation in the BVI about these contracts and, in particular, concern that they were in essence payments made to Mr Skelton Cline without any (or any adequate or sufficient) public benefit." He noted that none of the contracts went through tender, and observed that when Pastor Cline "was being measured against the criteria and deliverables set out in the contracts, he did not measure up well". He found that "Mr Skelton Cline did not perform the contract, nor did he seek to do so. He gave no (or no adequate) value in those terms."
- Statutory Boards. The Commission noted: "Concerns about political interference with independent statutory boards in the BVI are not new: they have been expressed over many years." He reviewed the history, and summarised his "overarching concern is that the conduct I have described, including but certainly not confined to the Premier's policy to revoke all members of all statutory boards and replace them with individuals in whom he had confidence, was overt manipulation by the executive of institutions which are established by the legislature to perform identified public functions as autonomous bodies independent of the executive government." He expanded, "it is clear that (and I find that), on the Attorney General's advice, the Premier accepted that he and Cabinet appreciated the decision to revoke would be unlawful; but they proceeded with it anyway". In his conclusions he noted "the evidence is overwhelming that that independence has been severely – and, at times, cynically and with apparent disdain – eroded. As in other areas of government which the COI has looked at, the executive government appears to take the view that it can treat statutory boards as it wishes."
- Disposals of Crown Land. The report referred to "the disposal of these two plots of prime commercial land by the BVI Government for a nominal amount is inexplicable." He finds that "serious dishonesty in relation to public officials may have taken place. It is certainly a specific matter which, in my view, cries out for further investigation."
- Residency and Belongership. The Committee found: "On the evidence, it seems quite clear that at least 224 applicants for belongership were granted that status “outside the framework of the law” in 2011". It further noted that the cases the Commission reviewed "strongly suggestive that Cabinet is willing to act outside the statutory criteria where it wishes to do so" and that "Cabinet appears to be willing to act in a legally arbitrary manner".
- Governance and Dishonesty in Public Office. The report asserted that "governance within the areas of BVI Government under the control of the elected public officials is, at best, very poor, with principles such as openness and transparency not simply absent but positively shunned; and proper procedures, checks and balances being absent, or patently inadequate for their purpose, or ignored or by-passed. The evidence in this regard is overwhelming". He later added: "Within the areas of government under the control of elected public officials, governance is almost uniformly very poor with proper procedures, checks and balances being absent, patently inadequate for purpose, by-passed or ignored."
- Colonialism. The Commission noted that the "media, and even some political figures in the BVI, have suggested that the UK Government retains a colonialist mind-set – and wishes to maintain control over the BVI contrary to the wishes of its people – I have seen no evidence of the UK Government being other than fully and unequivocally committed to these obligations. It is important that that commitment, and the wider commitment of the UK Government to the people of the BVI, continue to be emphasised, monitored and met. The people of the BVI are entitled to keep the UK Government up to the mark in that respect. It is also vitally important that conditions in the BVI allow the aspirations of the people who live there to be achieved, and that the UK Government ensures that such aspirations are not thwarted."

=== Other Observations ===
The report noted that the Attorney General's chambers had 69% of its positions unfilled and was "overwhelmed". The Attorney General blamed low compensation levels and an "inexplicably long and opaque" recruitment process.

The Complaints Commissioner noted that public complaints about the government had declined from a high of 135 (in 2011) to a low of just 16 (in 2018), before rising slightly to 30 (in 2020, the last year for which there were figures). The Commissioner thought this was for two reasons: firstly, the devastation of Hurricane Irma, and secondly, improvements in government service.

The DPP gave evidence (on which no findings were made) that the criminal courts of the British Virgin Islands were "grossly understaffed and under-resourced".

In relation to Customs and Immigration, Sir Gary held: "I cannot exclude the possibility that corruption may exist among officers in HM Customs and the Immigration Department. The environment in each – but particularly the former – is conducive to such".

== Response ==
Acting Premier Natalio Wheatley did not reject the report, but did issue a statement saying he was "very concerned" by the recommendations, and later made a public statement confirming that direct rule was "not acceptable".

Leader of the Opposition, Marlon Penn, did not immediately comment directly on the report, but did say he was "shocked and embarrassed" in relation to the arrest of Fahie.

The UK Foreign Secretary, Liz Truss, made an official statement saying "I have instructed the Minister for Overseas Territories to travel to the Territory immediately to speak to the Governor and key stakeholders. We will then announce a clear path forward." She added: "The Overseas Territories are a core part of the UK family. The UK Government is committed to the security and wellbeing of the people of the British Virgin Islands." Amanda Milling subsequently travelled to the British Virgin Islands for urgent talks as a result.

Local leaders moved swiftly to organise demonstrations against the proposed suspension of the Constitution.

On 8 June 2022, subordinate UK legislation was made allowing for direct rule for the islands. However, on that date the British government announced that it would not suspend the Territory's constitution as recommended by the Commission of Inquiry. The governor announced that the new "unity government" would be given time to enact reforms.

== Bibliography ==
- Hickinbottom, Gary (2022). "British Virgin Islands Commission of Inquiry: Report of the Commissioner, the Rt Hon Sir Gary Hickinbottom" (PDF). Government of the British Virgin Islands.
