= British Virgin Islands news websites =

BVI Platinum News.

There are presently five principal British Virgin Islands news websites publishing news focused upon current affairs in the Territory:

- BVI News
- BVI Beacon
- Virgin Islands Platinum News
- Virgin Islands News Online
- 284 Media

The British Virgin Islands only has two newspapers (and those are both published weekly), and no full-time television station.

Of the two functioning newspapers in the Territory (the BVI Beacon and the Island Sun) both also have news websites that are updated regularly. In the neighbouring United States Virgin Islands, the main daily, the Virgin Islands Daily News reports on some stories developing in the British islands.

Some news sites in the Territory allow a great deal of latitude to the public to comment anonymously upon articles (referred to, slightly misleadingly, as "blogs" locally). In a community as small as the British Virgin Islands anonymous comments often indicate inside knowledge in relation to news items, or serve as a vox populi in relation to developing stories.

== Main news websites ==
=== Relative popularity ===
The relative popularity of the main online news sites in the British Virgin Islands ebbs and flows over time. As at 7 April 2017 online web traffic services ranked them as follows:

Website	SimilarWeb Rank		Alexa Rank	
Website	BVI	Global	BVI	Global
BVI Platinum	8	198,847	17	505,569
BVI News	9	188,739	13	441,913
VINO	10	212,639	12	459,065
BVI Beacon	188	1,993,886	117	2,206,990
BVI Hot Press	542	5,887,542	n/a	6,143,512
Island Sun	740	5,733,959	n/a	4,943,539

=== BVI News ===
BVI News arguably has the highest profile of the three mainstream sites outside of the Territory, ranking higher than all of its competitors internationally on both SimilarWeb and Alexa (within the British Virgin Islands it ranks second on both ranking sites). It is not viewed as politically affiliated. It does not publish the names of any of its senior staff or journalists. The parent company of BVI News is Media Expressions Limited.

Economics commentator Dickson Igwe is a regular contributor to BVI News (although he also frequently contributes the same articles to the BVI Beacon in print).

=== Virgin Islands Platinum News ===
Virgin Islands Platinum News was originally named "BVI Platinum", and is often still referred to as such. Although the firm's website address reflects its original name, it now uses the Government approved national moniker. The news site has been criticised as pro-National Democratic Party, and anti-Virgin Islands Party.

The news sites present senior reporters are Melissa Edwards and Gordon French. Platinum News does not publish details of its ownership online, but the web address is registered to Platinum Investors Limited, a company registered in the British Virgin Islands.

In 2013 BVI Platinum was accused of breach of ethics by local politician Archibald Christian in relation to the publication of a leaked Government report.

In 2017 BVI Platinum won the award for best online news site at the Best of the BVI Businesses Award Ceremony.

=== Virgin Islands News Online ===
Virgin Islands News Online (often referred to simply as "VINO", or sometimes "the Yellow Site" or "the Esteeme Site"). It is alleged that the site is align with the political viewpoint of the Virgin Islands Party (VIP). There is open conflict between the news site and the ruling National Democratic Party (NDP), because of the news sites frequent challenges of the policies of the NDP. VINO is also critical towards Police Commissioner David Morris. The website is associated with Julian Willock, who served from 2010 to 2012 as permanent secretary to Minister of Communications and Works.

The current Editor in Chief of VINO is Reuben J. A. Stoby, and the senior reporter is Nikolai J. Earle. According to its home page, VINO is owned by Advance Marketing and Professional Services. The domain name itself is registered in the name of an ownership privacy protection organisation.

VINO has been part of a number of controversies during its existence.

- Doubts as to whether its marketing manager John E. Leonard actually exists, or whether he was a cipher for other parties, have been expressed both in other media, and in the House of Assembly. In March 2015 it was announced that Mr Leonard was parting ways with VINO.
- VINO was sued for defamation by politician and ophthalmologist, Dr Hubert O'Neal. A court initially awarded Dr O'Neal US$20,000 but that was later made subject to appeal. VINO accused other new sites of a hidden agenda in relation to the reports, and alleged that the lead journalist of a competitor might be racist.
- In 2013 VINO refused to pull an article after the Magistrate threatened to initiate contempt of court proceedings.
- Also in 2013 VINO was criticised for showing pictures of a bloodied murder victim but many readers and the public came to their defense. The news site strongly defended its actions.
- In April 2016 Minister of Education Myron Walwyn sued the news site for libel.

=== Newspaper sites ===
The website of the BVI Beacon is ranked on SimilarWeb as only the 542nd most popular website in the Territory, and the Island Sun is ranked 720th.

== Press censorship ==
From time there have been criticisms of the British Virgin Islands government in relation to allegations of press censorship. This may be a by-product of having much of the online news reporting originating from politically affiliated sources. Allegations of attempted press censorship have usually focused upon one of two concerns.

1. The first relates to the controversial Computer Misuse and Cybercrimes Act, 2014, which was criticised both within the British Virgin Islands and aboard as an attack on press freedom. Amendments to the legislation to permit "public interest" publication of information somewhat mollified those criticisms.
2. The second area of criticism relates to unfulfilled promises to pass a Freedom of Information Act in the British Virgin Islands. Despite multiple promises to introduce such legislation, to date not even draft legislation has been issued for public consultation. The Government has blamed a busy legislative timetable.

Governments have increasingly been at pains to say that they have no intention of muzzling the press. External reviews consider that "The media enjoys freedom of the press and speech" in the Territory.
