= Standpoint =

Standpoint may refer to:

== Theories ==
- Standpoint theory, a postmodern method for analyzing inter-subjective discourses
- Standpoint feminism, an ideology that argues feminist social science should be practiced from the standpoint of women
- Perspective (cognitive), a point of view

== Media ==
- Standpoint (magazine), a monthly British cultural and political magazine
- The BVI Standpoint, a newspaper published in the British Virgin Islands
