= David Pearey =

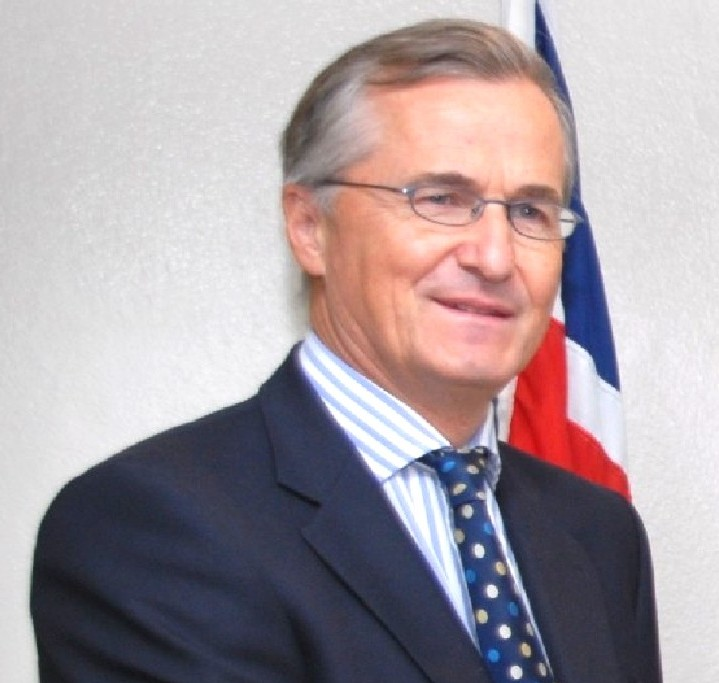

Governor of the British Virgin Islands
- In office 18 April 2006 – 5 August 2010
- Monarch: Elizabeth II
- Premier: Orlando Smith; Ralph T. O'Neal
- Preceded by: Tom Macan
- Succeeded by: William Boyd McCleary

High Commissioner of the United Kingdom to Malawi
- In office 2004 – 2005
- Monarch: Elizabeth II
- Prime Minister: Tony Blair
- Preceded by: Norman Ling
- Succeeded by: Richard Wildash

Personal details
- Born: 15 July 1948 (age 78)
- Spouse: Susan Pearey
- Children: 1
- Education: Corpus Christi College, Oxford

Viceregal styles of David Pearey (2006-2010)
- Reference style: His Excellency
- Spoken style: Your Excellency

David Pearey (born 15 July 1948) was the Governor of the British Virgin Islands from 18 April 2006 to 5 August 2010. He was appointed by Queen Elizabeth II on the advice of the British government, to represent the Queen in the territory, and to act as the de facto head of state.

Prior to his appointment as governor, Pearey served as High Commissioner to Malawi from 2004 to 2005.

== Education and personal life ==
Pearey was educated at the University of Oxford, where he studied PPE (Philosophy, Politics and Economics) at Corpus Christi College.

He has a wife, Susan, and one daughter Poppy who studies Archaeology and Anthropology at Keble College, University of Oxford following in her father’s footsteps.

| Preceded by Tom Macan | Governor of the British Virgin Islands; 2006-2010 | Succeeded by William Boyd McCleary |

== See also ==
- Governor of the British Virgin Islands

== Sources ==
- Foreign & Commonwealth Office - David Pearey
