= Tom Macan =

British diplomat (born 1946)

Governor of the British Virgin Islands
- In office 14 October 2004 – 10 April 2006
- Monarch: Elizabeth II
- Premier: Ralph T. O'Neal; Orlando Smith
- Preceded by: Frank Savage
- Succeeded by: David Pearey

Personal details
- Born: 14 November 1946 (age 79)

Viceregal styles of Tom Macan (2004-2006)
- Reference style: His Excellency
- Spoken style: Your Excellency

Thomas Townley Macan (born 14 November 1946) was Governor and Commander-in-Chief of the British Virgin Islands, an overseas territory of the United Kingdom in the Caribbean Sea, from 14 October 2004 to 10 April 2006. He was educated at Shrewsbury School and the University of Sussex.

On the advice of the British government, he was appointed by Queen Elizabeth II to represent the Queen in the territory and to act as the unofficial head of state.

Preceded by Frank Savage	Governor of the British Virgin Islands; 2002-2006	Succeeded by David Pearey
