= David Archer (politician) =

British Virgin Islander politician

David Archer is a British Virgin Islander politician who is serving as Deputy Governor of the British Virgin Islands and served as Acting Governor of the Virgin Islands under a dormant commission.

== Personal life ==
He comes from a family of politicians and community leaders where his grandfather, the late Hon. Prince Stoutt served as a politician and member of the Legislative Council. Prince Stoutt is the brother of the BVI's first Chief Minister, the late Hon. H. Lavity Stoutt. Prince and Lavity Stoutt were the first brothers to serve in the Legislature of the BVI.

== Career ==
Archer graduated from Tennessee Wesleyan College with a Bachelor of Science degree in business administration and human resources management. He later obtained two master's degrees: one from the online Capella University in business administration and another in human resources from the former Milano School of Policy, Management, and Environment in New York. Mr. Archer has served as the Director of Human Resources, a Permanent Secretary and a Strategic Liaison Officer to the Governor before taking on the role of Deputy Governor.

He was initially appointed Deputy Governor from 2 June to 31 July 2016 until Rosalie Adams took over the post after he resigned. He resigned in order to pursue a PhD in economics under a graduate scholarship from the University of the West Indies in Jamaica. He took on the same role after she resigned, becoming Deputy Governor on 1 March 2018.

Mr. Archer is known for transformative leadership of organizations and for the development of people. He is also an author of several books, entitled Pioneering Greatness.
