= Rosalie Adams =

British Virgin Islands politician

Rosalie Louise Adams, OBE served as Acting Governor of the British Virgin Islands under a dormant commission that was invoked in 2017. She had previously served as Deputy Governor of the British Virgin Islands. She also served as Permanent Secretary in the Ministry of Health and Social Development, Permanent Secretary, Ministry of Communications and Works, Permanent Secretary, Premier's Office and Interim Acting Permanent Secretary in the Premier's Office at various times.

In the 2018 Birthday Honours, Adams was appointed an Officer of the Order of the British Empire (OBE) for services to the British Virgin Islands.
