= BVI Airways =

Airline of the British Virgin Islands

IATA	ICAO	Call sign
4V	BVI	DRAKE
- Founded: 2009
- Commenced operations: 5 May 2010
- Hubs: Terrance B. Lettsome International Airport
- Fleet size: 2
- Destinations: 4
- Parent company: BVAirways
- Headquarters: Terrance B. Lettsome International Airport, Beef Island, Tortola, British Virgin Islands
- Key people: Jerry Willoughby (CEO) 2014
- Website: Former website

BVI Airways is a defunct airline of the British Virgin Islands. Its headquarters were located at its hub at Terrance B. Lettsome International Airport serving the territory's main island of Tortola with the capital, Road Town. It suspended inter-island operations in late 2014, shortly after a change of ownership to concentrate on a non-stop schedule directly to the United States. The company slogan was Your Caribbean Airline.

In July 2017 the airline made most of its staff redundant, and in March 2018 it was alleged that at least one of its aircraft had been sold off to a third party, Net Tune Airwaves. A number of controversial allegations have been made about the airline in a lawsuit.

In May 2020, following a report by the Auditor General, it was announced that there would be a 'full criminal investigation' into the Government's investment in the airline. In June 2020 it was announced that funding would be made available to hire specialist investigators to assist the Royal Virgin Islands Police Force in relation to an investigation into criminal aspects of the matter.

== History ==
BVI Airways was founded in 2009 and started operations in May 2010, initially serving the popular Beef Island (EIS) to St Maarten (SXM) route three times per week. In September 2010 the airline began flying some services on behalf of Winair, adding Dominica (DOM) to its route network.

In March 2014 the airline changed ownership with Jerry Willoughby taking over the company from Luke Smith. Willoughby was a former Delta Air Lines Captain and announced plans for bigger aircraft and an expanded route network, including plans to link Tortola directly with Miami International Airport (MIA).

In January 2016 it was announced by the Premier of the British Virgin Islands that a partnership was formed to launch flights starting in winter 2016-17 direct to Miami.

In June 2020 a report highly critical of the Auditor General in relation to the Government's handling of the investment into BVI Airways was published.

== Fleet ==
BVI Airways' initial fleet consisted of two 19-seater British Aerospace Jetstream Super 31 commuter turboprops. The new non-stop service to Miami will make use of the British Aerospace Avro RJ 100 jet with the Avro RJ 100 being a later model version of the British Aerospace Bae 146 jet. In October 2016, BVI Airways received its maiden airlines type RJ-100 aircraft naming BVI Airways with two more to be delivered. Once regulation plans are completed this aircraft will make the first non-stop international flight from Tortola to Miami in many years. However, at the present time, it appears there is no non-stop scheduled passenger jet service between Tortola and Miami according to FlightAware.

== Government Funding ==
In January 2016 the Government of the British Virgin Islands announced that it would be investing US$7 million into the airline. In July 2016 it was reported that there would be a small delay in the commencement of direct flights to Miami. Other proposed dates for commencement have come and gone. According to FlightAware, there is no scheduled passenger airline service being operated between Tortola and Miami with jet aircraft at the present time.

In July 2017 the airline implemented wide-ranging redundancies, casting doubts upon its future. Shortly thereafter Hurricane Irma struck the Territory causing widespread disruption to air carriers for an extended period of time.

In December 2017 the BVI Government served notices upon the airline accusing it of being in material breach of the $7 million contract it had signed with Government. In February 2018 it was reported that the Government had still not taken any steps to enforce its claims, and in July 2018 a Government minister gave a press conference saying they "could not locate" any of the principals of the airline. In March 2018 opposition politician Andrew Fahie called for a Commission of Inquiry into the investment, alleging that the money is now irrecoverable. He later described the payment to the airline as a "scam".

== Redundancies ==
In July 2017 BVI Airways announced that it was laying off all of its staff due to cash shortages. In a press release the airline indicated that the step was necessary because the airline had depleted most of cash reserves before it had begun flights, but expressed the hope that the layoffs would be temporary.

== Lawsuits ==
In a lawsuit filed in the New York courts between the present and previous owners of BVI Airways, a number of serious allegations of misconduct were made in relation to the running of the airline.

== Criminal investigation ==
The Auditor General issued a report into the Government's investment, which was delivered to the Governor in February 2020. After an initial delay it was shared with the Cabinet in April 2020, and then released to the public in June. In the statement the Governor, Augustus Jaspert, noted that the report "highlighted a number of areas where there have been failures to follow proper processes: in seeking competitive options for contracts; in failing to adopt legal and other advice; in the execution of a contract, and in weaknesses in financial and project performance management systems." He added: "This is all hugely concerning", noting "previous audit reports have highlighted similar failures which have also led to the loss of Government’s revenues." He further noted that "The Commissioner of Police has undertaken steps to launch a criminal investigation based on the contents of this report."

In May 2020, following a report by the Auditor General, it was announced that there would be a 'full criminal investigation' into the Government's investment in the airline. In June 2020 it was announced that funding would be made available to hire specialist investigators to assist the Royal Virgin Islands Police Force in relation to the investigation into criminal aspects of the matter.
