= BVI Beacon =

The BVI Beacon
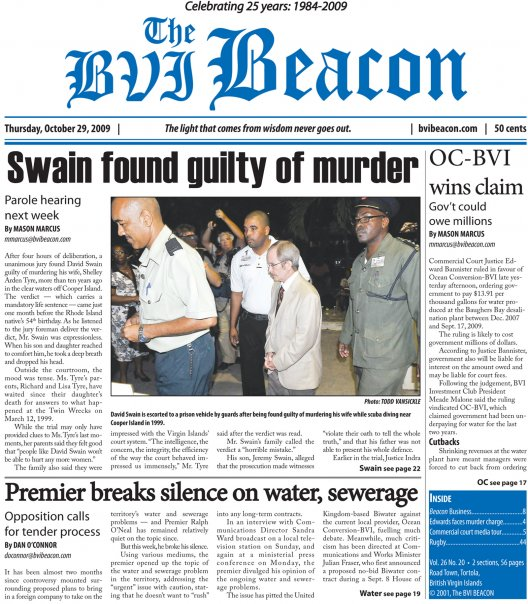
- The 29 October 2009, front page of BVI Beacon
- Type: Weekly newspaper
- Format: Tabloid
- Owner: Russell Harrigan
- Publisher: Russell Harrigan
- Editor: Freeman Rogers
- Staff writers: 3
- Founded: June 1984
- Headquarters: 10 Russell Hill Road, Road Town, Tortola, British Virgin Islands
- Website: bvibeacon.com

The BVI Beacon is a weekly British Virgin Islands newspaper founded in June 1984 and published on the island of Tortola. The Beacon is owned and published by local businessman Russell Harrigan, also the publisher of Business BVI. The online version of the newspaper was founded on February 14, 2001.

The paper's motto is "The light that comes from wisdom never goes out." The paper is published on Thursdays, and organised into sections: Local News, Business, Weekend and Culture and Sports.

The first Beacon cost 35 cents. In 2018, the price was raised to $1.

== History ==
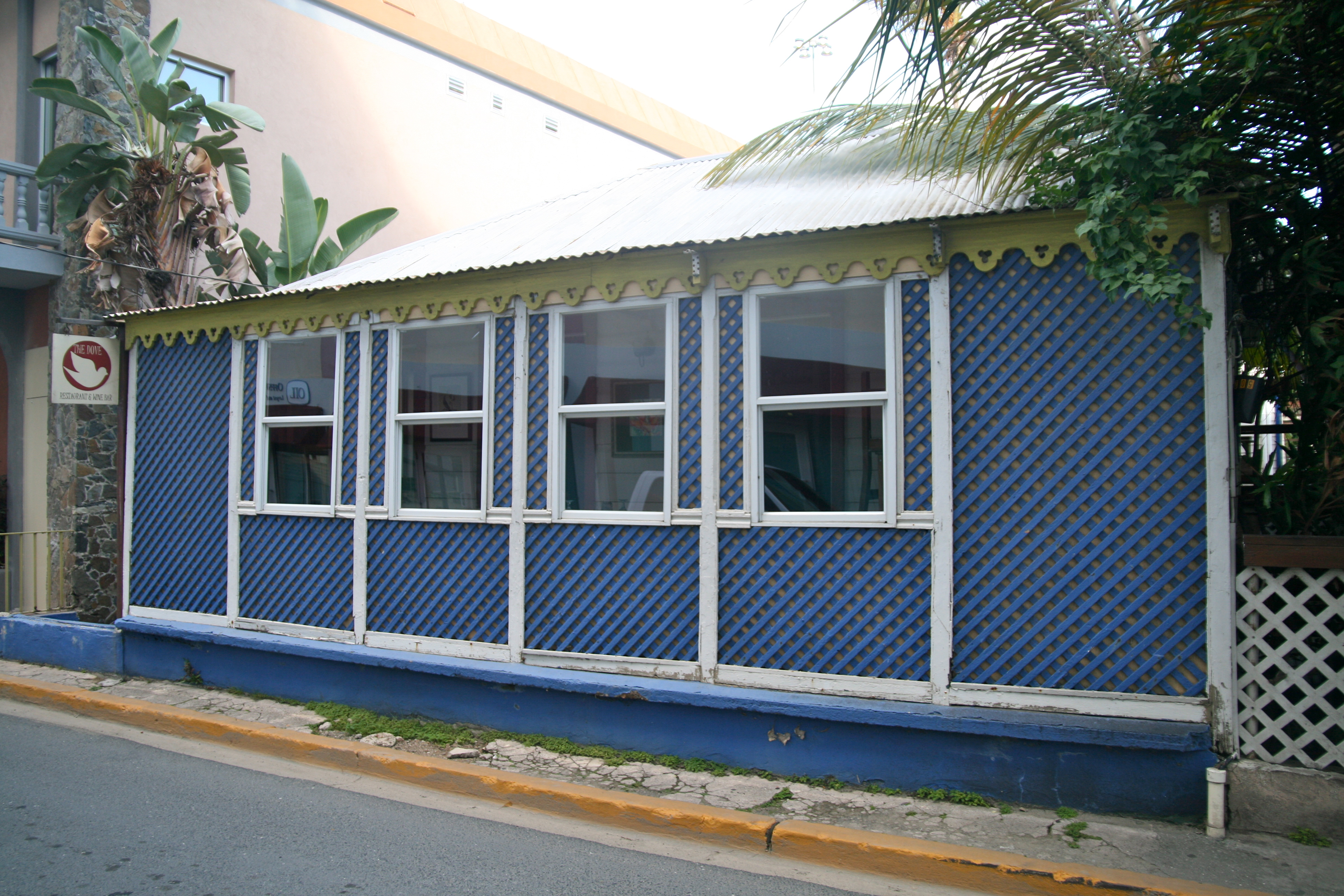
Former offices of The BVI Beacon, now The Dove Restaurant

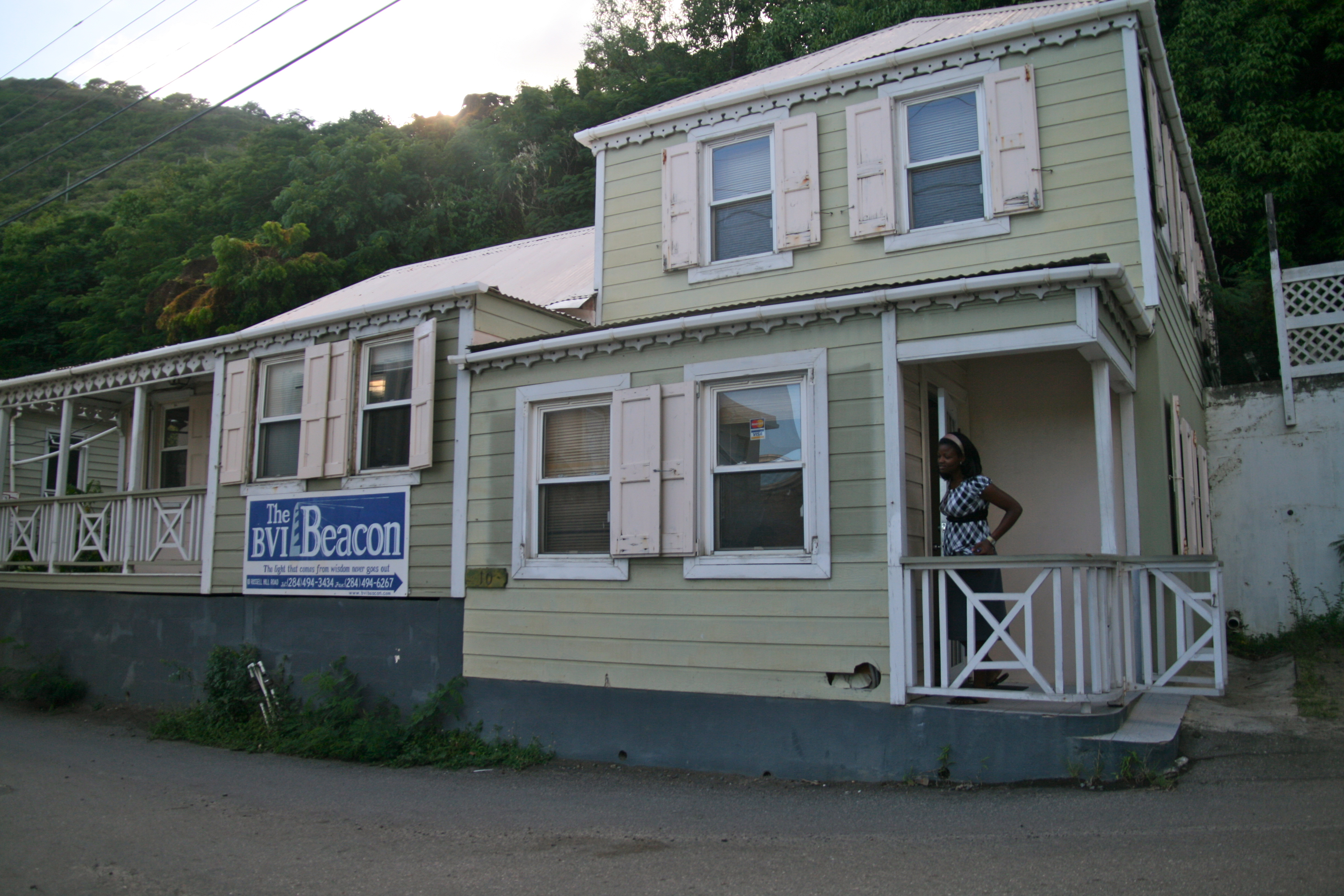
New BVI Beacon offices, at Russell Hill

The first issue of the Beacon was published on 7 June 1984. At the time, there was only one other newspaper in the territory, the Island Sun, which held a virtual monopoly on the business since 1962.

The first 12-page Beacon was produced by founders Linnell M. Abbott and her niece, Michelle Abbott. Originally published in black-and-white, the first paper included the lead story "Storm over VI fishing boundaries continues," and the Bulwiss wire, a short article written in local dialect.

On 12 February 1998, a Valentine's Day photo of a pink balloon heart, captioned "Love is in the air," heralded the start of regular colour photographs. In 2002, then-Assistant Editor Scott Bronstein began the DATELINE: Paradise column.

The Beacon was originally produced in a small house at 67 Main Street, now the location of the Dove Restaurant. In 1991, the paper moved into a traditional West Indian style house on Russell Hill Road.

The office was plagued with errant goats and chickens that would wander into the open-air workspace. Since, a modern expansion has been added, doubling the size of the facility, and air-conditioning installed. The goats and chickens still wander outside the gate. However, in September 2017, Hurricane Irma destroyed half the building.

Until 1987, the paper was written on a now-vintage Olympia portable typewriter. The same year, the Beacon began using computers. In 2006, the paper computerised layout and production of the paper, and in 2009, updated from 1998 iMac G3s to their modern counterpart.

In 2009, the newspaper was sold by Linnell M. Abbott and Business Manager Dora L. Harrigan, to its current owner, Russell Harrigan.
