= The BVI Standpoint =

- Type: Weekly newspaper (on Tuesdays)
- Headquarters: British Virgin Islands

The Standpoint is a defunct newspaper formerly published in the British Virgin Islands. It was originally published under the name Pennysaver, largely as a shopping-coupon promotional newspaper, and later emerged as one of the most influential sources of journalism in the Territory.

It was published weekly on Tuesdays.

== Motto ==
The newspaper's motto (published on its front page every week) is "If you don't stand for something, you'll fall for anything." The motto clearly adds a poignancy to the newspaper's name, and is derived from quotes variously attributed the American clergyman, Peter Marshall, and to the British journalist, Alex Hamilton (and frequently misattributed to American politician Alexander Hamilton), but latterly popularised by Ginger Rogers.
