= Daniel Pruce =

British public servant and diplomat

His Excellency Daniel Pruce
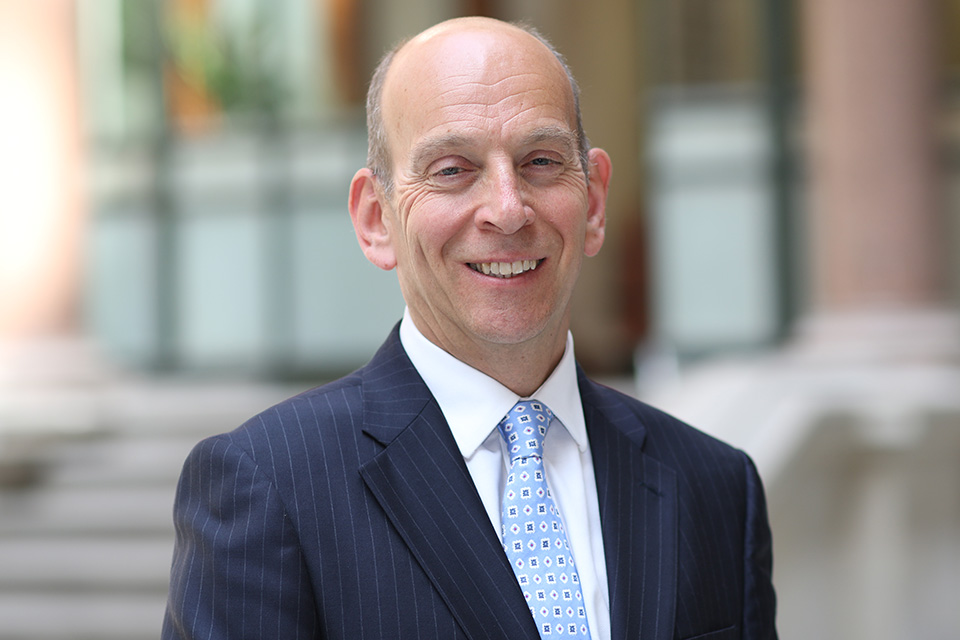
- Pruce in 2023

Governor of the Virgin Islands
- Incumbent
- Assumed office 29 January 2024
- Monarch: Charles III
- Premier: Natalio Wheatley
- Deputy: David Archer
- Preceded by: David Archer (acting)

British Ambassador to the Philippines and Ambassador to Palau
- In office August 2017 – August 2021
- Monarch: Elizabeth II
- Prime Minister: David Cameron; Theresa May; Boris Johnson
- Preceded by: Asif Ahmad
- Succeeded by: Laure Beaufils

Personal details
- Born: July 1966 (age 59–60)
- Citizenship: United Kingdom
- Spouse: Rachael Morgan

Daniel Pruce (born July 1966) is a British career public servant and diplomat who is currently serving as Governor of the Virgin Islands. The oath of office was administered by Justice Angelica Teeluckingh. He was previously, from 2021 to 2022, the interim director of communication at the Foreign, Commonwealth and Development Office (FCDO). He has also served as the British ambassador to the Philippines and a non-resident ambassador to Palau. He has worked in public service for over 30 years. He is married to Rachael Morgan.
