= The Island Sun =

Newspaper

The Island Sun

The Island Sun is a weekly newspaper in the British Virgin Islands. Founded on 23 June 1962, it is the oldest continuously published newspaper in the British Overseas Territory.

The Sun is published weekly by Sun Enterprises (B.V.I.) Limited, owned by businessman and historian Vernon W. Pickering.

== History ==
=== Early years ===
The Island Sun was founded in 1962 by Carlos and Esme Downing. Carlos Downing became the editor.

On June 23, 1962, the inaugural issue of The Island Sun was published. Having little public funding and no private financial backing, the paper struggled. However, there was significant support from readers, well-wishers and the British Virgin Islands government.

Contributing writers and columnists included Sir Alan Cobham, Dr. Norwell Harrigan, Dr. Pearl Varlack, Godfrey deCastro, Dr. Pierre Encontre, McW. Todman, QC, Sir. Ronald Sanders, Dr. Quincy Lettsome, Dr. Giorgio Migliavacca and Clarence Christian.

During the 1966 Royal Visit, Queen Elizabeth II asked Carlos Downing why he had ventured into publishing the newspaper. His answer was that "The Island Sun was not started in the sense of a business undertaking per se...(but) as a community venture and with confidence in the future of the Virgin Islands."

=== Later years ===
In 1985 Sun Enterprises (BVI) Ltd became the publisher for The Island Sun. Carlos Downing retired in 1987 and was replaced by Pickering, who had been assistant editor for three years. The first chairman of the board was the educator and historian, Dr. Norwell Harrigan.

Between 1986 and 1989, The Island Sun published a mid-week edition. The Island Sun originally used its own press. In 1987, the publishing was taken over by Caribbean Printing in St. Thomas, US Virgin Islands.

In 1989, The Island Sun was the only newspaper in both the British and US Virgin Islands to be published throughout Hurricane Hugo. In 1992 the BVI Hotel & Commerce Association bestowed on The Island Sun the "Past Merit Commerce Award". In 1997 The Island Sun became the first Virgin Islands (US and British) newspaper to have its website.

In 2002 the BVI Postal Authority issued two stamps to commemorate the 40th anniversary of The Island Sun. One stamp showed the front page of the 25th anniversary edition and the 1962 first edition. The second stamp depicted Carlos and Esme deCastro-Downing.

In 2008 The Island Sun was digitized, and in early 2014 the website was redesigned and revamped.

== Current newspaper ==
The Island Sun has gone from 12 pages of the 1970s, 20 in the early 1980s, to an average of 40 pages today. The paper has an eight-page supplement called "Sunny Side Up".

Pickering described The Island Sun as a "team achievement". He identified two pillars of The Island Sun in publishing consultant Dr. Giorgio Migliavacca, and circulation and advertising manager Delseita "Peggy" Carney-Liburd.

News items and editorials from The Island Sun are frequently reprinted or referred to in the international media, including The Washington Post, CNN, PBS, BBC, and the British Daily Telegraph. Also, Caribbean newspapers such as St. Croix Avis, and the Voice of St. Lucia carry reports from The Island Sun.

A survey of the daily traffic on The Island Sun website has shown an average 3,500 visits per day, and on certain days as many as 18,000 accesses have been reported.
