= Governor of the Virgin Islands =

Representative of the British monarch to the British Virgin Islands

- Standard of the governor

- Arms of the Virgin Islands

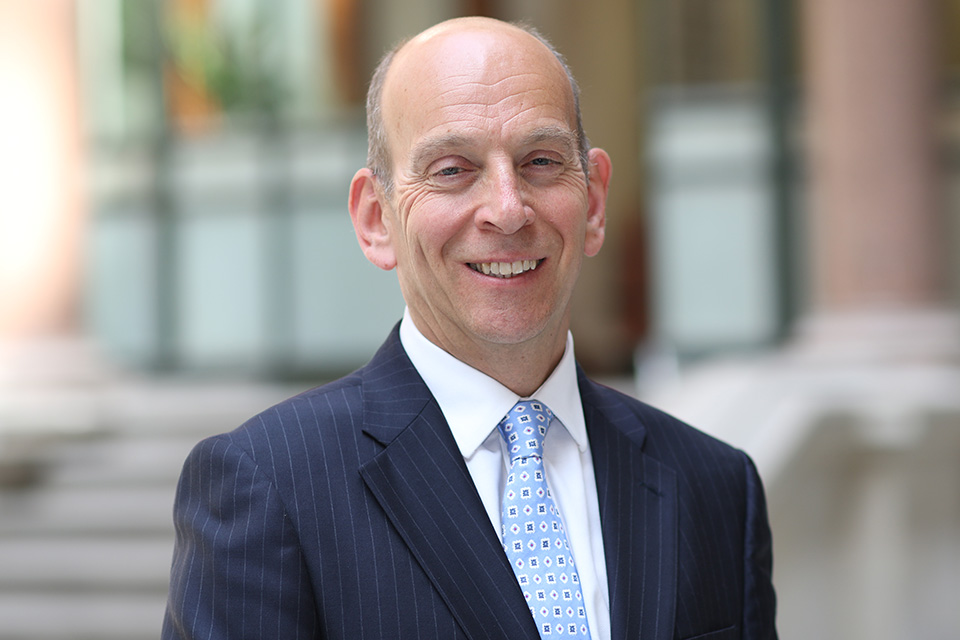
- Incumbent; Daniel Pruce since 29 January 2024
- Style: His Excellency
- Residence: Government House, Road Town, Tortola
- Appointer: King of the United Kingdom
- Formation: 1887
- First holder: Edward John Cameron as Administrator
- Website: Office of the Governor

The governor of the Virgin Islands is the representative of the British monarch in the United Kingdom's overseas territory of the British Virgin Islands. The governor is appointed by the monarch on the advice of the British government. The role of the governor is to act as the de facto head of state, and is responsible for appointing the premier and the executive council.

The current governor is Daniel Pruce.

The governor has a viceregal flag, the Union Flag defaced with the territory's coat of arms. The official residence of the governor is Government House located in Road Town, Tortola.

== History ==
The first colonial administration on the islands was the Dutch. England annexed the Islands in 1672. An administrator was appointed to the islands from 1887, and replaced by a governor in 1971 when the islands were created a distinct territory.

Prior to this date, the local council would elect one of their members to be president (see List of presidents of the British Virgin Islands).

Up until 1971, the administrators were answerable to the governors of the Leeward Islands, of which the British Virgin Islands formed a part.

== Powers ==
The governor is responsible for the conduct of any business of the Government of the Virgin Islands, including the administration of any department of government, with respect to the following matters:

1. External affairs;
2. Defence, including the armed forces;
3. Internal security, including the Police Force;
4. The terms and conditions of service of persons holding or acting in public offices, without prejudice to section 92; and
5. The administration of the courts.

The governor also has various powers to make and remove appointments, and a power of pardon.

Subject to certain exceptions, the Governor is required to consult with the Cabinet in the exercise of all functions conferred by the Constitution or any other law for the time being in force in the British Virgin Islands.

== List ==
=== Administrators of the British Virgin Islands ===
- Edward John Cameron (1887–1894)
- Alexander R. Mackay (1894–1896)
- Nathaniel George Cookman (1896–1903)
- Robert Stephen Earl (1903–1910)
- Thomas Leslie Hardtman Jarvis (1910–1919)
- Herbert Walter Peebles (1919–1922)
- R. Hargrove (1922–1923)
- Otho Lewis Hancock (1923–1926)
- Frank Cecil Clarkson (1926–1934)
- Donald Percy Wailling (1934–1946)
- John Augustus Cockburn Cruikshank (1946–1954)
- Henry Howard (1954–1956)
- Geoffrey Pole Allesbrook (1956–1959)
- Gerald Jackson Bryan (1959–1962)
- Martin Samuel Staveley (1962–1967)
- Sir Ian Thomson (1967–1971)

=== Governors of the British Virgin Islands ===
- Derek George Cudmore (15 October 1971 – 3 November 1974)
- Walter Wilkinson Wallace (3 November 1974 – 5 November 1978)
- James Alfred Davidson (5 November 1978 – 7 November 1982)
- David Robert Barwick (7 November 1982 – 2 September 1986)
- Mark Herdman (2 September 1986 – 17 March 1991)
- Peter Penfold (17 March 1991 – 3 February 1995)
- David Mackilligin (3 February 1995 - 16 October 1998)
- Frank Savage (16 October 1998 – 11 October 2004)
- Elton Georges (11–14 October 2004; acting)
- Tom Macan (14 October 2004 – 16 April 2006)
- Dancia Penn (16–22 April 2006; acting)
- David Pearey (22 April 2006 – 11 August 2010)
- V. Inez Archibald (11–20 August 2010; acting)
- William Boyd McCleary (20 August 2010 – 1 August 2014)
- V. Inez Archibald (1–15 August 2014; acting)
- John Duncan (15 August 2014 – 8 August 2017)
- Robert A. Mathavious (8–12 August 2017; acting)
- Rosalie Adams (12–22 August 2017; acting)
- Augustus Jaspert (22 August 2017 – 23 January 2021)
- David D. Archer, Jr (23–29 January 2021; acting)
- John Rankin (29 January 2021 – 18 January 2024)
- David D. Archer, Jr (18–29 January 2024; acting)
- Daniel Pruce (29 January 2024 – present)

Note: Acting governors are the incumbent deputy governor of the British Virgin Islands who was in office when they acted as governors under the terms of their dormant commissions.
