= British Virgin Islands =

British Overseas Territory in the Caribbean

The Virgin Islands
- British Overseas Territory
- Flag Coat of arms
- Motto: Vigilate (Latin) (Note: Therefore keep watch, because you do not know on what day your Lord will come.); English: "Be Vigilant" (Note: In Latin biblical passages and elsewhere, the phrase "vigilate et custodite" appears with the meaning "be vigilant and guard." In everyday English, it's used as "Stay vigilant.") (Matthew 24:42 NIV)
- Anthem: "God Save the King" (Note: "God Save the King" is the national anthem by custom, not statute, and there is no authorised version. Typically only the first verse is usually sung, although the second verse is also often sung as well at state and public events. The words King, he, him, his, used at present, are replaced by Queen, she, her when the monarch is female.)
- Territorial anthem: "Oh, Beautiful Virgin Islands"
- Location of British Virgin Islands (circled in red)

- Sovereignty: United Kingdom
- Before annexation: Dutch West Indies
- British capture: 1672
- Separate colony: 1960
- Autonomy: 1967
- Capital and largest city: Road Town; 18°25′53″N 64°37′23″W
- Official languages: English
- Vernacular language: Virgin Islands Creole
- Ethnic groups (2010): 76.9% Black; 5.6% Hispanic; 5.4% White; 5.4% Mixed; 2.1% Indian; 4.6% other
- Demonym(s): Virgin Islander
- Government: Parliamentary dependency under a constitutional monarchy
  - Monarch: Charles III
  - Governor: Daniel Pruce
  - Premier: Natalio Wheatley
- Legislature: House of Assembly

Government of the United Kingdom
  - Parliamentary Under-Secretary of State: Uma Kumaran

Area
  - Total: 153 km^{2} (59 sq mi)
  - Water (%): 1.6
- Highest elevation: 521 m (1,709 ft)

Population
  - 2024 estimate: 38,984
  - 2010 census: 28,054
  - Density: 260/km^{2} (673.4/sq mi) (68th)
- GDP (PPP): 2017 estimate
  - Total: $500 million
  - Per capita: $34,200
- GDP (nominal): 2024 estimate
  - Total: $1.82 billion
  - Per capita: $46,685
- Currency: United States dollar ($; USD)
- Time zone: UTC−04:00 (AST)
- Date format: dd/mm/yyyy
- Driving side: Left
- Calling code: +1
- UK postcode: VG-11xx
- ISO 3166 code: VG
- Internet TLD: .vg
- Website: gov.vg

The British Virgin Islands (BVI), officially the Virgin Islands, is a British Overseas Territory in the Caribbean, to the east of Puerto Rico and the US Virgin Islands and north-west of Anguilla. The islands are geographically part of the Virgin Islands archipelago and are located in the Leeward Islands of the Lesser Antilles and part of the West Indies.

The British Virgin Islands consist of the main islands of Tortola, Virgin Gorda, Anegada and Jost Van Dyke, along with more than 50 other smaller islands and cays. About 16 of the islands are inhabited. The capital, Road Town, is on Tortola, the largest island, which is about 20 km (12 mi) long and 5 km (3 mi) wide. The islands had a population of 28,054 at the 2010 Census, of whom 23,491 lived on Tortola. In 2024, a government estimate put the population at 38,984.

The economy of the territory is overwhelmingly dominated by tourism and financial services, with the territory using the United States dollar. In terms of financial services, the territory is known as a leading hub for tax evasion and concealment of assets.

British Virgin Islanders are British Overseas Territories citizens and, since 2002, also British citizens.

== Etymology ==
The islands were named "Santa Úrsula y las Once Mil Vírgenes" by Christopher Columbus in 1493 after the legend of Saint Ursula and the 11,000 virgins. The name was later shortened to "the Virgin Islands".

The official name of the territory is still simply the "Virgin Islands", but the prefix "British" is often used. This is commonly believed to distinguish it from the neighbouring American territory which changed its name from the "Danish West Indies" to "Virgin Islands of the United States" in 1917. However, local historians have disputed this, pointing to a variety of publications and public records dating from between 21 February 1857 and 12 September 1919, where the territory is referred to as the British Virgin Islands. British Virgin Islands government publications continue to begin with the name "The territory of the Virgin Islands", and the territory's passports simply refer to the "Virgin Islands", and all laws begin with the words "Virgin Islands". Moreover, the territory's Constitutional Commission has expressed the view that "every effort should be made" to encourage the use of the name "Virgin Islands". Several public and quasi-public bodies continue to use the "British Virgin Islands" or "BVI" name, including BVI Finance, the BVI Electricity Corporation, the BVI Tourist Board, the BVI Athletic Association, and the BVI Bar Association.

In 1968, the British Government issued a memorandum requiring that the postage stamps in the territory should say "British Virgin Islands" (whereas previously they had simply stated "Virgin Islands"), a practice which is still followed today. This was likely to prevent confusion following on from the adoption of US currency in the territory in 1959, and the references to US currency on the stamps of the territory.

== History ==
It is generally thought that the Virgin Islands were first settled by the Arawak from South America around 100 BC to AD 200, though there is some evidence of Amerindian presence on the islands as far back as 1500 BC. The Arawaks inhabited the islands until the late pre-Columbian period. Archaeological evidence indicates extensive interaction, migration, and cultural exchange among communities in the Virgin Islands, Puerto Rico, and the Lesser Antilles during the Late Ceramic Age, with evidence for the emergence of cultural traditions associated with Kalinago ancestors prior to European contact.

The first European sighting of the Virgin Islands was by the Spanish expedition of Christopher Columbus in 1493 on his second voyage to the Americas, who gave the islands their modern name.

The Spanish Empire claimed the islands by discovery in the early 16th century, but never settled them, and subsequent years saw the English, Dutch, French, Spanish, and Danish all jostling for control of the region, which became a notorious haunt for pirates. There is no record of any native Amerindian population in the British Virgin Islands during this period; it is thought that most either fled to safer islands or were killed by 1596.

The Dutch established a permanent settlement on the island of Tortola by 1648, frequently clashing with the Spanish who were based on nearby Puerto Rico. In 1672, the English captured Tortola from the Dutch, and the English annexation of Anegada and Virgin Gorda followed in 1680. Between 1672 and 1733, the Danish colonized the neighbouring islands of Saint Thomas, Saint John, and Saint Croix, which now form the United States Virgin Islands.

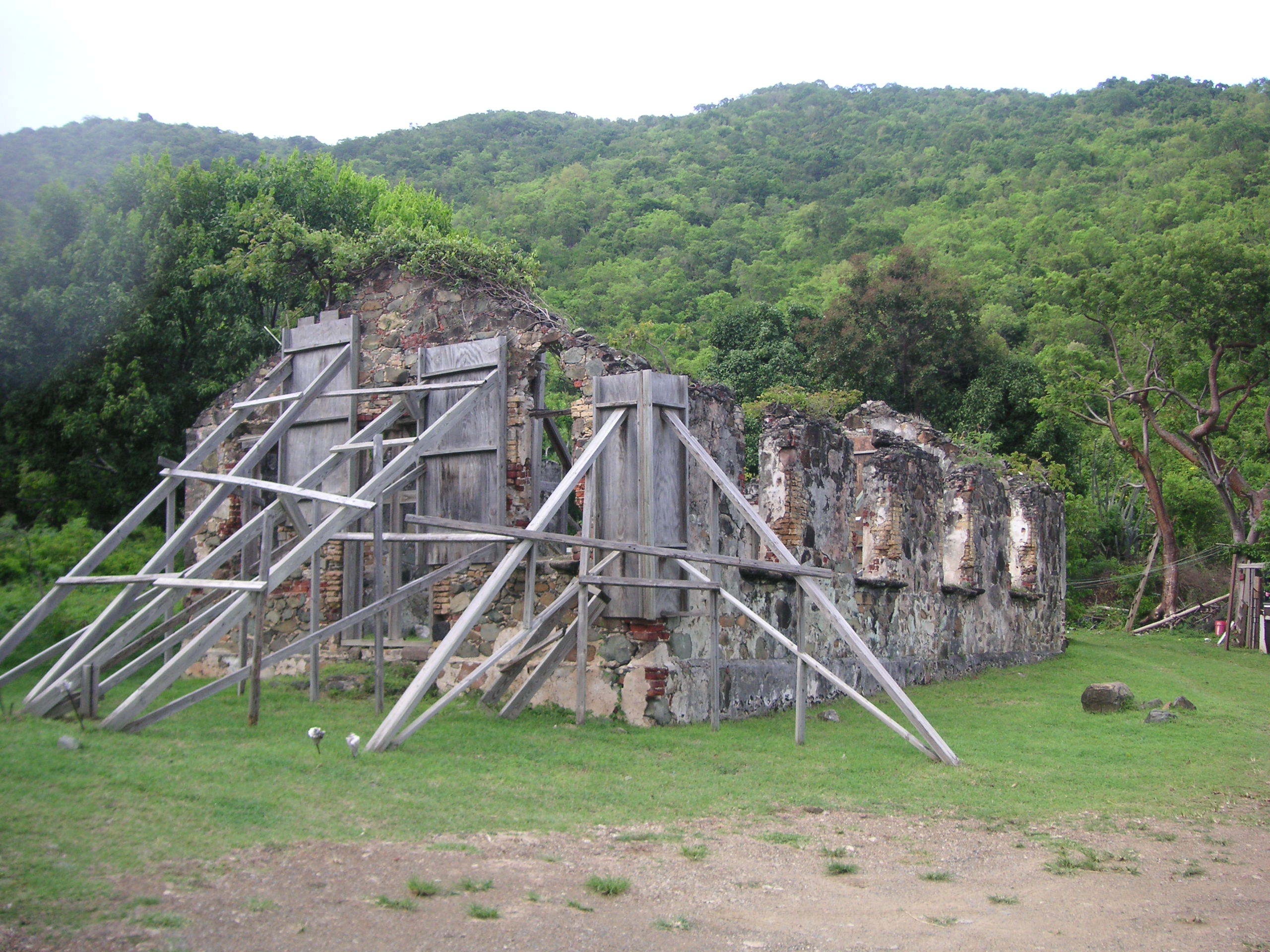
The ruins of St. Phillip's Church, Tortola, one of the most important historical ruins in the territory

The British islands were considered principally a strategic possession. The British introduced sugar cane which was to become the main crop and source of foreign trade, and large numbers of slaves were forcibly brought from Africa to work on the sugar cane plantations. The islands prospered economically until the middle of the nineteenth century, when a combination of the abolition of slavery in the British Empire in 1834, a series of disastrous hurricanes, and the growth in the sugar beet crop in Europe and the United States significantly reduced sugar cane production and led to a period of economic decline.

In 1917, the United States purchased the Danish Virgin Islands for US$25 million, renaming them the United States Virgin Islands. Economic linkages with the US islands prompted the British Virgin Islands to adopt the US dollar as its currency in 1959.

The British Virgin Islands were administered variously as part of the British Leeward Islands or with St. Kitts and Nevis, with an administrator representing the British Government on the islands. The islands gained separate colony status in 1960 and became autonomous in 1967 under the new post of Chief Minister. Since the 1960s, the islands have diversified away from their traditionally agriculture-based economy towards tourism and financial services, becoming one of the wealthiest areas in the Caribbean. The constitution of the islands was amended in 1977, 2004 and 2007, giving them greater local autonomy.

In 2017 Hurricane Irma struck the islands, causing four deaths and immense damage.

== Geography ==
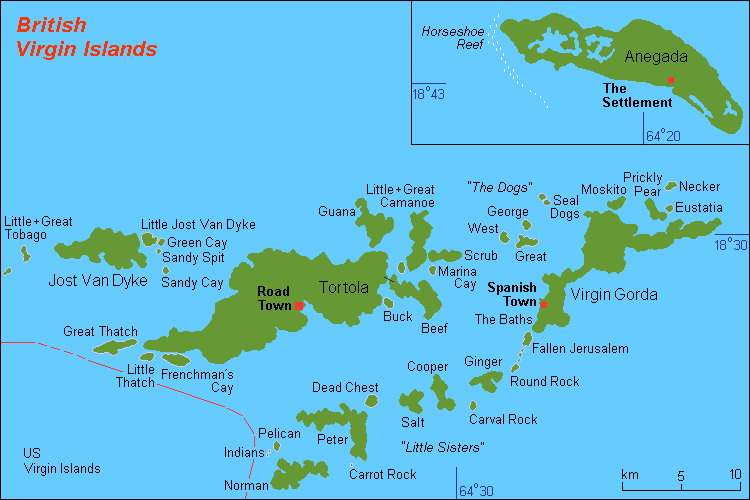
Map of the British Virgin Islands. Note: Anegada is farther away from the other islands than shown.

The British Virgin Islands comprise around 60 tropical Caribbean islands, ranging in size from the largest, Tortola, being 20 km (12 mi) long and 5 km (3 mi) wide, to tiny uninhabited islets, altogether about 150 square kilometres (58 square miles) in extent. They are located in the Virgin Islands archipelago, a few miles east of the US Virgin Islands, and about 95 km (59 mi) from the Puerto Rican mainland. About 150 km (93 mi) east south-east lies Anguilla. The North Atlantic Ocean lies to the east of the islands, and the Caribbean Sea lies to the west. Most of the islands are volcanic in origin and have a hilly, rugged terrain. The highest point is Mount Sage on Tortola at 521m. Anegada is geologically distinct from the rest of the group, being a flat island composed of limestone and coral. The British Virgin Islands contain the Leeward Islands moist forests and Leeward Islands xeric scrub terrestrial ecoregions. In the British Virgin Islands forest cover is around 24% of the total land area, equivalent to 3,620 hectares (ha) of forest in 2020, down from 3,710 hectares (ha) in 1990.

=== Climate ===
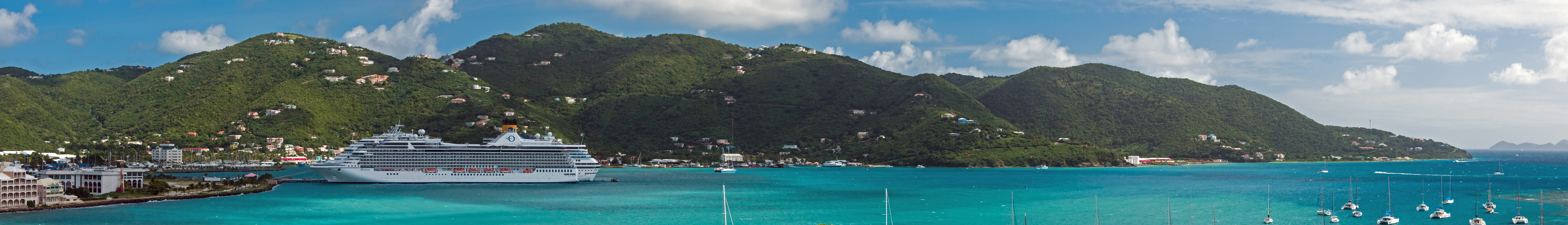

The British Virgin Islands have a tropical savanna climate, moderated by trade winds. Temperatures vary little throughout the year. In the capital, Road Town, typical daily maxima are around 32 °C (89.6 °F) in the summer and 29 °C (84.2 °F) in the winter. Typical daily minima are around 26 °C (78.8 °F) in the summer and 23 °C (73.4 °F) in the winter. Rainfall averages about 1,150 mm (45.3 in) per year, higher in the hills and lower on the coast. Rainfall can be quite variable, but the wettest months on average are September to November and the driest months on average are February and March.

Climate data for Cyril E. King Airport (1991–2020 normals)
Month	Jan	Feb	Mar	Apr	May	Jun	Jul	Aug	Sep	Oct	Nov	Dec	Year
Mean daily maximum °C (°F)	28.9 (84.1)	29.1 (84.3)	29.2 (84.5)	29.8 (85.7)	30.7 (87.2)	31.6 (88.9)	32.1 (89.7)	32.1 (89.8)	31.8 (89.2)	31.3 (88.4)	30.3 (86.6)	29.6 (85.2)	30.6 (87.0)
Daily mean °C (°F)	26.0 (78.8)	26.1 (78.9)	26.2 (79.1)	27.0 (80.6)	27.9 (82.3)	28.9 (84.1)	29.2 (84.5)	29.3 (84.7)	29.1 (84.4)	28.5 (83.3)	27.6 (81.6)	26.7 (80.1)	27.7 (81.9)
Mean daily minimum °C (°F)	23.1 (73.6)	23.1 (73.5)	23.2 (73.8)	24.2 (75.5)	25.3 (77.5)	26.3 (79.3)	26.3 (79.3)	26.4 (79.6)	26.4 (79.5)	25.7 (78.3)	24.8 (76.6)	23.8 (74.9)	24.9 (76.8)
Average precipitation mm (inches)	67 (2.64)	48 (1.90)	47 (1.86)	57 (2.24)	77 (3.02)	60 (2.35)	74 (2.91)	111 (4.37)	150 (5.89)	134 (5.28)	154 (6.06)	74 (2.93)	1,053 (41.45)
Average precipitation days (≥ 0.01 in)	15.0	13.5	10.7	10.6	11.9	10.9	14.8	15.8	15.2	17.3	18.5	17.4	171.6
Source: NOAA

==== Hurricanes ====
Hurricanes occasionally hit the islands, with the Atlantic hurricane season running from June to November.

===== Hurricane Irma =====
Damage in Road Town following Hurricane Irma

On 6 September 2017, Hurricane Irma struck the islands, causing extensive damage, especially on Tortola, and killing four people. The Caribbean Disaster Emergency Management Agency declared a state of emergency. Visiting Tortola on 13 September 2017, UK Foreign Secretary Boris Johnson said that he was reminded of photos of Hiroshima after it had been hit by the atom bomb.

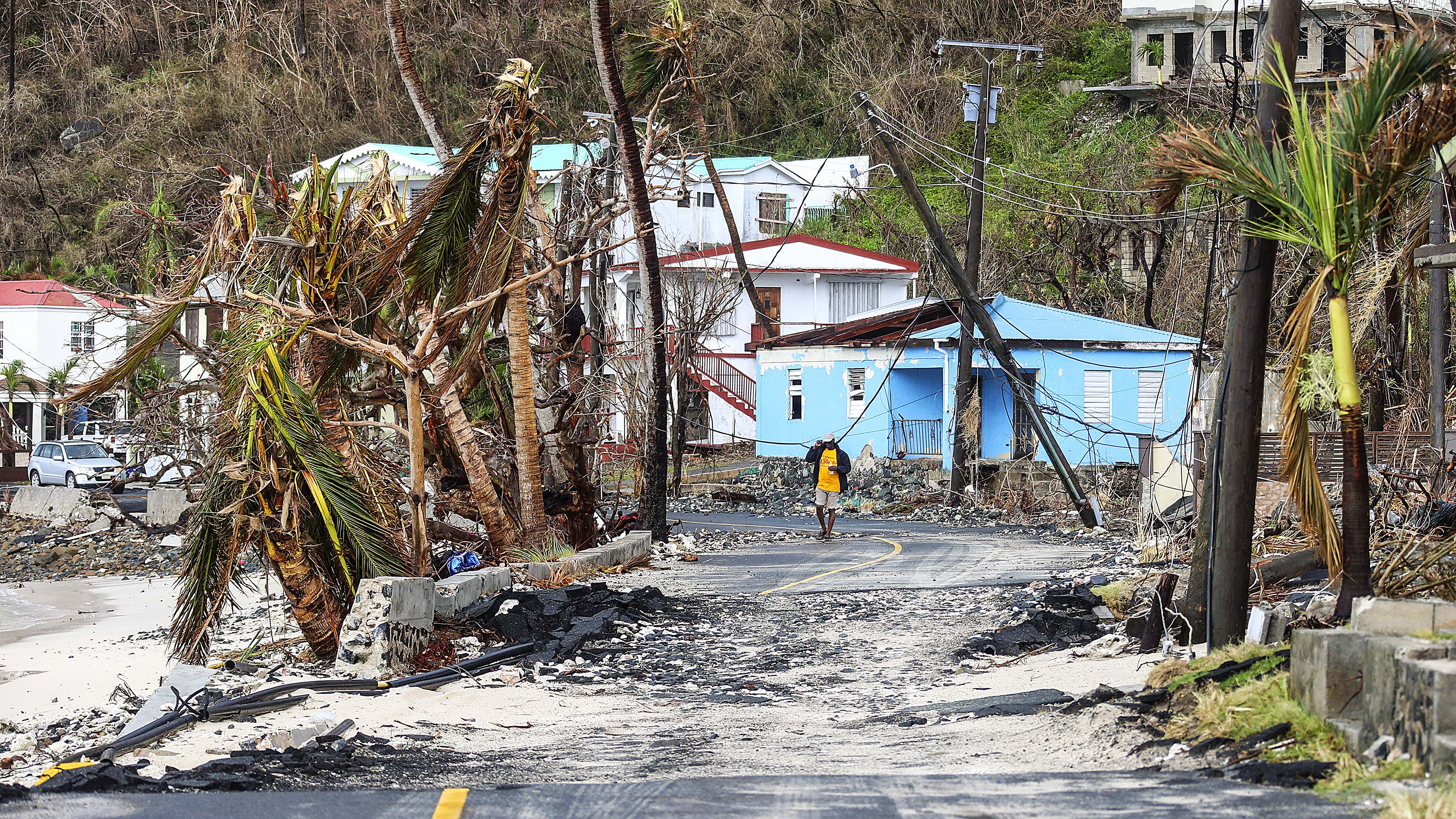
Hurricane Maria struck a week after Hurricane Irma

By 8 September, the UK government sent troops with medical supplies and other aid. More troops were expected to arrive a day or two later, but HMS Ocean, carrying more extensive assistance, was not expected to reach the islands for another two weeks.

Entrepreneur Richard Branson, a resident of Necker Island, called on the UK government to develop a massive disaster recovery plan to include "both through short-term aid and long-term infrastructure spending". Premier Orlando Smith also called for a comprehensive aid package to rebuild the territory. On 10 September UK Prime Minister Theresa May pledged £32 million to the Caribbean for a hurricane relief fund and promised that the UK government would match donations from the public to the British Red Cross appeal. Specifics were not provided to the news media as to the amount that would be allocated to the Virgin Islands. Boris Johnson's visit to Tortola on 13 September 2017 during his Caribbean tour was intended to confirm the UK's commitment to helping restore British islands but he provided no additional comments on the aid package. He did confirm that HMS Ocean had departed for the BVI carrying items like timber, buckets, bottled water, food, baby milk, bedding and clothing, as well as ten pick-up trucks, building materials and hardware.

The UK offered to underwrite rebuilding loans up to US$400m as long as there was accountability as to how the monies were spent. Successive NDP and VIP governments declined, despite there having been created a Recovery & Development Authority led by highly skilled infrastructure personnel, many of whom were ex-military with decades of infrastructure rebuilding expertise from war zones and natural disaster sites. Many wealthy residents also proposed a large rebuilding plan, starting with key infrastructure, such as the high school. Nearly five years later, there was no sign of any such rebuilding of the high school or certain other key infrastructure.

== Government and politics ==
Charles III
King

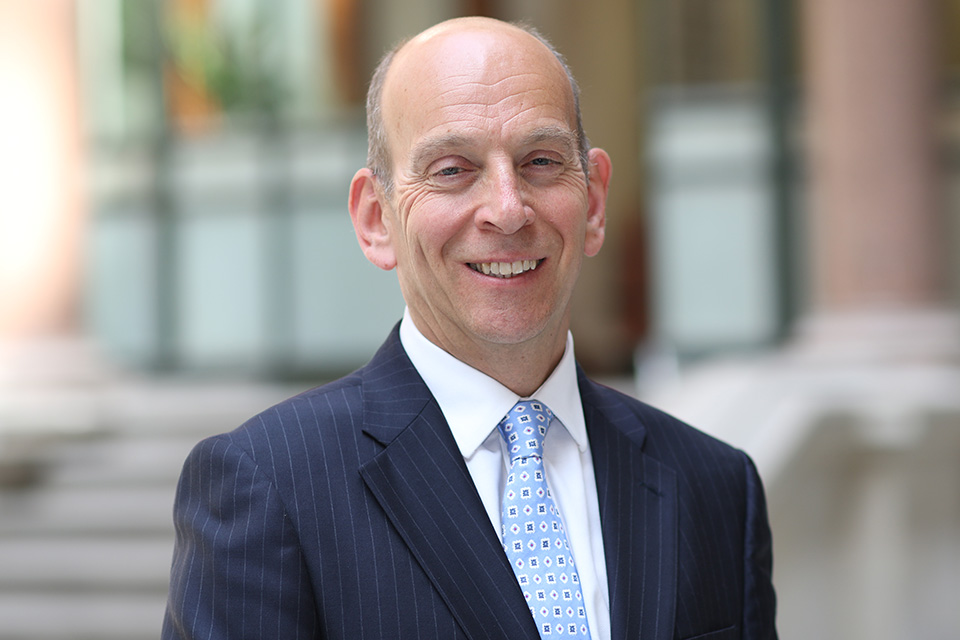
Daniel Pruce
Governor

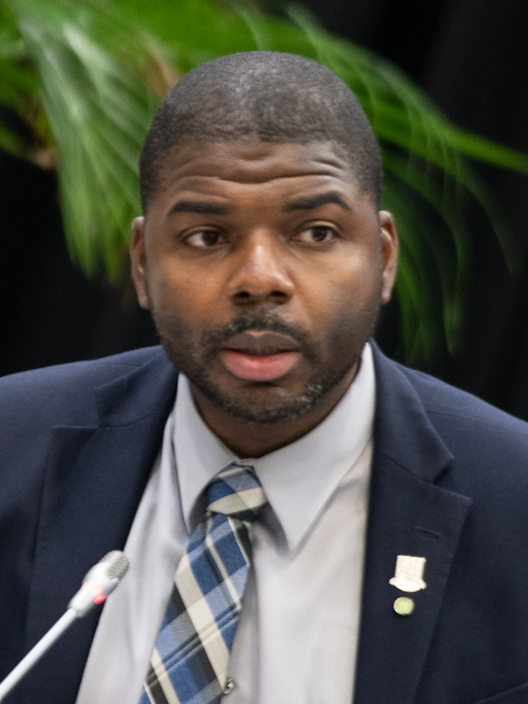
Natalio Wheatley
Premier

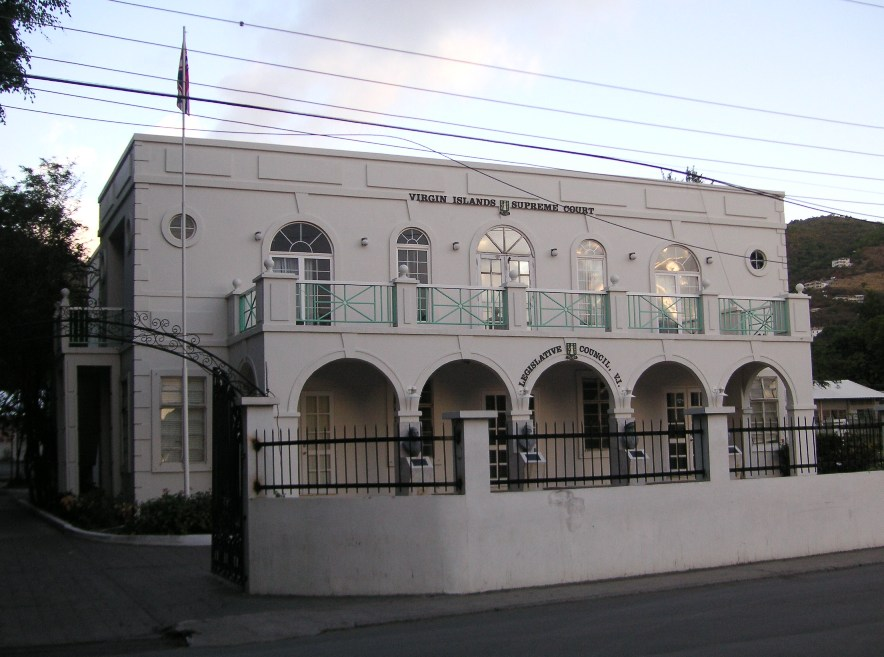
Legislative Council building in Road Town. The High Court sits upstairs.

The territory operates as a parliamentary democracy. Ultimate executive authority in the British Virgin Islands is vested in the King, Charles III, and is exercised on his behalf by the Governor of the British Virgin Islands. The governor is appointed by the King on the advice of the British Government. Defence and most foreign affairs remain the responsibility of the United Kingdom.

The most recent constitution was adopted in 2007 (the Virgin Islands Constitution Order, 2007) and came into force when the Legislative Council was dissolved for the 2007 general election. The head of government under the constitution is the Premier (before the new constitution the office was referred to as Chief Minister), who is elected in a general election along with the other members of the ruling government as well as the members of the opposition. Elections are held roughly every four years. A cabinet is nominated by the Premier and appointed and chaired by the Governor. The Legislature consists of the King (represented by the Governor) and a unicameral House of Assembly made up of 13 elected members plus the Speaker and the Attorney General.

The current Governor is Daniel Pruce (since 29 January 2024). The current Premier is Natalio Wheatley (since 5 May 2022), who is leader of the Virgin Islands Party.

On 8 June 2022, subordinate UK legislation was made allowing for direct rule for the islands. However, the British Government decided on that date not to implement direct rule.

=== Subdivisions ===
The British Virgin Islands is a unitary territory. The territory is divided into nine electoral districts, and each voter is registered in one of those districts. Eight of the nine districts are partly or wholly on Tortola, and encompass nearby neighbouring islands. Only the ninth district (Virgin Gorda and Anegada) does not include any part of Tortola. At elections, in addition to voting their local representative, voters also cast votes for four candidates who are elected upon an at-large territory-wide basis.

=== Military ===
As a British Overseas territory, defence of the islands is the responsibility of the United Kingdom.

=== Law and criminal justice ===
Crime in the British Virgin Islands is comparatively low by Caribbean standards. While statistics and hard data are relatively rare, and are not regularly published by governmental sources in the British Virgin Islands, the then-Premier did announce that in 2013 there was a 14% decline in recorded crime compared to 2012. Homicides are rare, with just one incident recorded in 2013.

The Virgin Islands Prison Service operates a single facility, His Majesty's Prison in East End, Tortola.

The British and US Virgin Islands sit at the axis of a major drugs transshipment point between Latin America and the continental United States. The American Drug Enforcement Administration regards the adjacent US territories of Puerto Rico and the US Virgin Islands as a "High Intensity Drug Trafficking Area".

== Economy ==
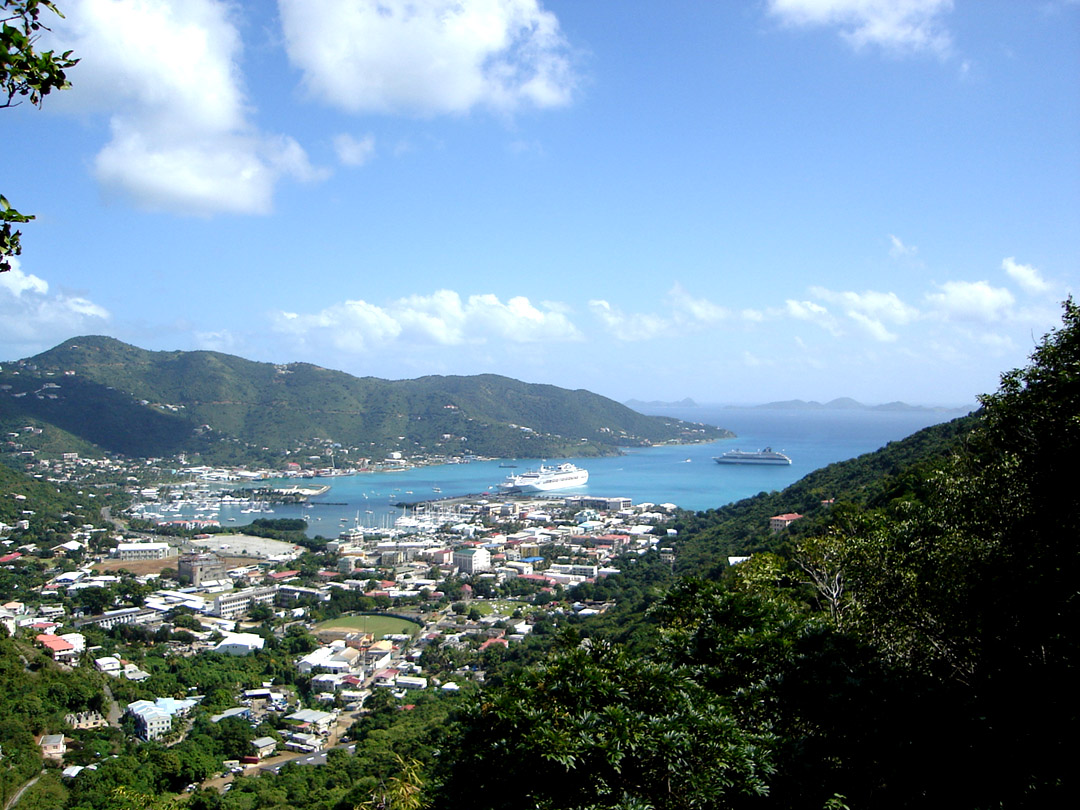
Road Town, Tortola, British Virgin Islands

The twin pillars of the economy are financial services (60%) and tourism (roughly 40–45% of GDP).

Economically however, financial services associated with the territory's status as an offshore financial centre are by far the more important. 51.8% of the Government's revenue comes directly from licence fees for offshore companies, and considerable further sums are raised directly or indirectly from payroll taxes relating to salaries paid within the trust industry sector (which tend to be higher on average than those paid in the tourism sector). According to Transparency International, the British Virgin Islands is one of the top incorporation hubs for anonymous companies used to conceal assets and stolen funds.

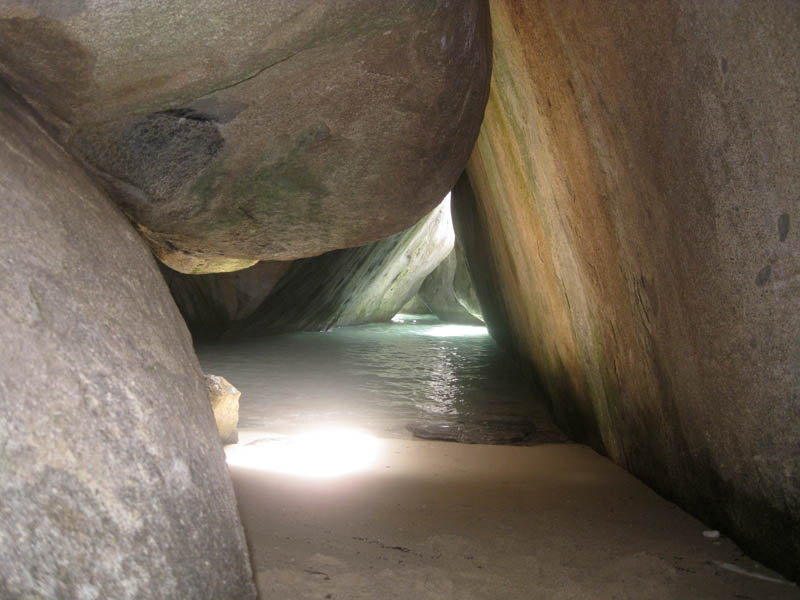
The Baths, Virgin Gorda

The official currency of the British Virgin Islands has been the United States dollar (US$) since 1959, the currency also used by the United States Virgin Islands.

The British Virgin Islands enjoys one of the more prosperous economies of the Caribbean region, with a per capita average income of around $47,000 (2022 est.)

Although it is common to hear criticism in the British Virgin Islands' press about income inequality, no serious attempt has been made by economists to calculate a Gini coefficient or similar measure of income equality for the territory. A report from 2000 suggested that, despite the popular perception, income inequality was actually lower in the British Virgin Islands than in any other OECS state, although in global terms income equality is higher in the Caribbean than in many other regions.

=== Tourism ===
Tourist arrivals of 2024 in %

Tourism accounts for approximately 45% of national income. The islands are a popular destination for US citizens. Tourists frequent the numerous white sand beaches, visit The Baths on Virgin Gorda, snorkel the coral reefs near Anegada, or experience the well-known bars of Jost Van Dyke. The BVI are known as one of the world's greatest sailing destinations, and charter sailboats are a very popular way to visit less accessible islands. Established in 1972, the BVI hosts the BVI Spring Regatta and Sailing Festival. A substantial number of the tourists who visit the BVI are cruise ship passengers, and although they produce far lower revenue per head than charter boat tourists and hotel-based tourists, they are nonetheless important to the substantial – and politically important – taxi driving community.

=== Financial services ===
Financial services account for over half of the income of the territory. The majority of this revenue is generated by the licensing of offshore companies and related services. The British Virgin Islands is a significant global player in the offshore financial services industry. Since 2001, financial services in the British Virgin Islands have been regulated by the independent Financial Services Commission.

The BVI relies upon the Commercial Court division of the Eastern Caribbean Supreme Court, as well as the BVI Arbitration Centre. Caribbean KCs and British KCs preside over the majority of cases, and the laws of the Virgin Islands are based on English laws, providing clarity and consistency should parties require commercial disputes to be resolved. Owing to the international nature of BVI companies' operations and asset holdings, the BVI Commercial Court hears matters regarding cross-border litigation and enforcement involving large financial sums.

Citco, also known as the Citco Group of Companies and the Curaçao International Trust Co., is a privately owned global hedge fund administrator headquartered in the British Virgin Islands, founded in 1948. It is the world's largest hedge fund administrator, managing over $1 trillion in assets under administration.

In May 2022, the banking sector of the British Virgin Islands comprised only seven commercial banks and one restricted bank, 12 authorised custodians, two licensed money services businesses and one licensed financing service provider.

The British Virgin Islands is frequently referred to as a "tax haven" by campaigners and NGOs, including Oxfam. Successive governments in the British Virgin Islands have implemented tax exchange agreements and verified beneficial ownership information of companies following the 2013 G8 summit putting their governance and regulatory regimes far ahead of many "onshore" jurisdictions.

On 10 September 2013, British Prime Minister David Cameron said "I do not think it is fair any longer to refer to any of the Overseas Territories or Crown Dependencies as tax havens. They have taken action to make sure that they have fair and open tax systems. It is very important that our focus should now shift to those territories and countries that really are tax havens." Yet journalist and author for The Economist, Nicholas Shaxson, writes in his 2016 Treasure Islands, tax havens and the men who stole the world: "...Britain sits, spider-like, at the centre of a vast international web of tax havens, which hoover up trillions of dollars' worth of business and capital from around the globe and funnel it up to the City of London. The British Crown Dependencies and Overseas Territories – ...the British Virgin Islands... are some of the biggest players in the offshore world."(pp. vii–viii) Shaxson points out that despite BVI having fewer than 25000 inhabitants, hosts over 800,000 companies.

In the April 2016 Panama Papers leak, while all of the wrongdoing by Mossack Fonseca personnel occurred in Panama and the US, the British Virgin Islands was by far the most commonly used jurisdiction by clients of Mossack Fonseca.

In 2022, the verified nature of beneficial ownership registers of the British Overseas Territories and Crown Dependencies were a crucial tool in giving effect to sanctions against Russia and Belarus, enabling the efficient identification and seizure of yachts, real estate and businesses.

==== Foreign Account Tax Compliance Act ====
On 30 June 2014, The British Virgin Islands was deemed to have an Inter- Governmental Agreement (IGA) with the United States of America with respect to the "Foreign Account Tax Compliance Act" of the United States of America.

The Model 1 Agreement (14 Pages) recognises that: The Government of the United Kingdom of Great Britain and Northern Ireland provided a copy of the Letter of Entrustment which was sent to the Government of the British Virgin Islands, to the Government of the United States of America "via diplomatic note of 28 May 2014".

The Letter of Entrustment dated 14 July 2010 was originally provided to the Government of the British Virgin Islands and authorised the Government of the BVI "to negotiate and conclude Agreements relating to taxation that provide for exchange of information on tax matters to the OECD standard" (Paragraph 2 of the FATCA Agreement). Via an "Entrustment Letter" dated 24 March 2014, The Government of the United Kingdom, authorised the Government of the BVI to sign an agreement on information exchange to facilitate the Implementation of the Foreign Account Tax Compliance Act. On 27 March 2017, the US Treasury site disclosed that the Model 1 agreement and related agreement were "In Force" on 13 July 2015.

==== Sanctions and Anti-Money Laundering Act ====
Under the UK Sanctions and Anti-Money Laundering Act of 2018, beneficial ownership of companies in British overseas territories such as the British Virgin Islands must be publicly registered for disclosure by 31 December 2020. The Government of the British Virgin Islands has not yet formally challenged this law, yet has criticised it, noting that it violates the Constitutional sovereignty granted to the islands, and would in practice be relatively ineffective in anti-money laundering and counter-terrorism financing, while raising serious privacy and human rights issues. Further, this would put the British Virgin Islands in a position where it would be at a severe disadvantage because other International Finance Centres do not have this in place, and in the case of the US and the UK, there is very little near-term prospect of the same.

In late 2022, both of the US and EU appeared to have endorsed the British Overseas Territories' beneficial ownership register regimes. In a judgement dated 22 November 2022, the European Court of Justice (ECJ) has at last decided that open public access to the beneficial owner registers of EU member state companies is no longer valid, as it is in contravention of articles 7 and 8 of the Charter of Fundamental Rights of the European Union (the Charter). The US appears to have come to a similar conclusion regarding balancing confidentiality and legitimate privacy with the Anti-Money Laundering advantages of having verified beneficial ownerships registers. The resultant goal appears to be to bring the US in line with the current Cayman and BVI regimes. The UK's Crown Dependencies have already stated that they will not implement public registers without beforehand having received fresh legal advice on the matter and it is thought that the Overseas Territories would logically take a similar position. The UK is yet to come out in support of the BOTs and CDs and their current gold standard regulatory positions.

=== Agriculture and industry ===
Agriculture and industry account for only a small proportion of the islands' GDP. Agricultural produce includes fruit, vegetables, sugar cane, livestock and poultry, and industries include rum distillation, construction and boat building. Commercial fishing is also practised in the islands' waters.

=== Workforce ===
The British Virgin Islands is heavily dependent on migrant workers, and over 50% of all workers on the islands are of a foreign descent. Only 37% of the entire population were born in the territory. The national labour-force is estimated at 12,770, of whom approximately 59.4% work in the service sector but less than 0.6% are estimated to work in agriculture (the balance working in industry). The British Virgin Islands has met challenges in recruiting sufficient numbers in recent years, having been affected by hurricanes Irma and Maria, and having continued to lag behind other jurisdictions in providing a reliable permanent residence regime. This has had a knock-on effect in limiting schooling and amenities when compared to IFCs like Cayman, UAE, Singapore, and Hong Kong.

==== CARICOM status and the CARICOM Single Market Economy ====
As of 2 July 1991, the British Virgin Islands holds Associate Member status in CARICOM, the Caribbean Single Market and Economy (CSME).

In recognition of the CARICOM (Free Movement) Skilled Persons Act which came into effect in July 1997 in some of the CARICOM countries such as Jamaica and which has been adopted in other CARICOM countries, such as Trinidad and Tobago, it is possible that CARICOM nationals who hold the "A Certificate of Recognition of Caribbean Community Skilled Person" may be allowed to work in the BVI under normal working conditions.

=== Transport ===
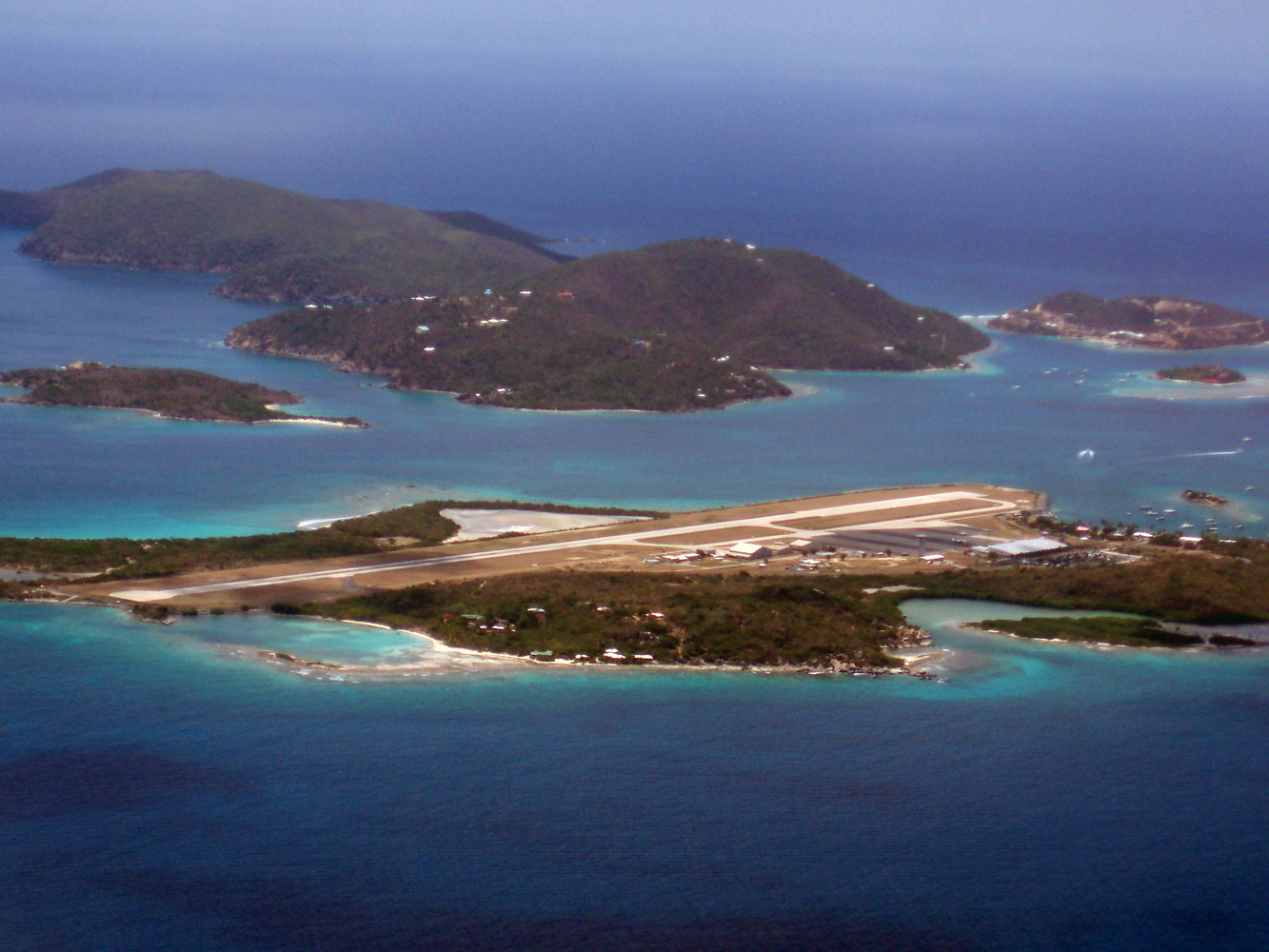
Terrance B. Lettsome International Airport on Beef Island

There are 113 kilometres (70 mi) of roads. The main airport, Terrance B. Lettsome International Airport, also known as Beef Island Airport, is located on Beef Island, which lies off the eastern tip of Tortola and is accessible by the Queen Elizabeth II Bridge. Cape Air, and Air Sunshine are among the airlines offering scheduled service. Virgin Gorda and Anegada have their own smaller airports. Private air charter services operated by Island Birds Air Charter fly directly to all three islands from any major airport in the Caribbean. Helicopters are used to get to islands with no runway facilities; Antilles Helicopter Services is the only helicopter service based in the country.

The main harbour is in Road Town. There are also ferries that operate within the British Virgin Islands and to the neighbouring United States Virgin Islands. Cars in the British Virgin Islands drive on the left just as they do in the United Kingdom and the United States Virgin Islands. However, most cars are left hand drive, because they are imported from the United States. The roads are often quite steep, narrow and winding, and ruts, mudslides and rockfall can be a problem when it rains.

== Demographics ==
As of the 2010 Census, the population of the territory was 28,054. Estimates put the population at 35,800 (July 2018) yet in 2022, it is thought to be much less than 30,000 in Irma's wake and with people having left during COVID lockdowns due to unemployment in the tourism industry. The majority of the population (76.9%) are Afro-Caribbean, descended from slaves brought to the islands by the British. Other large ethnic groups include Latinos (5.6%), those of European ancestry (5.4%), Mixed ancestry (5.4%) and Indian (2.1%).

The 2010 Census reports:

- 76.9% African
- 5.6% Hispanic
- 5.4% European/Caucasian
- 5.4% Mixed
- 2.1% East Indian
- 4.6% Others*

*Includes Chinese, Carib/Amerindian, Filipinos and Arabs

The 2010 Census reports the main places of origin of residents as follows:

- 39.1% local born (though many locals go to St. Thomas or the United States for maternity services)
- 7.2% Guyana
- 7.0% St. Vincent and the Grenadines
- 6.0% Jamaica
- 5.5% United States
- 5.4% Dominican Republic
- 5.3% United States Virgin Islands

The islands are heavily dependent upon migrant labour. In 2004, migrant workers accounted for 50% of the total population. 32% of workers employed in the British Virgin Islands work for the government. In the late 2000s the first Overseas Filipino Worker came to the British Virgin Islands, by 2020 total British Filipino population was about 800.

Unusually, the territory has one of the highest drowning mortality rates in the world, being higher than other high-risk countries such as China and India. 20% of deaths in the British Virgin Islands during 2012 were recorded as drownings, all of them being tourists. Despite this, the territory's most popular beach still has no lifeguard presence.

=== Language ===
The primary language is English, although there is a local dialect. Spanish is spoken by Puerto Rican, Dominican and other Hispanic immigrants.

=== Religion ===
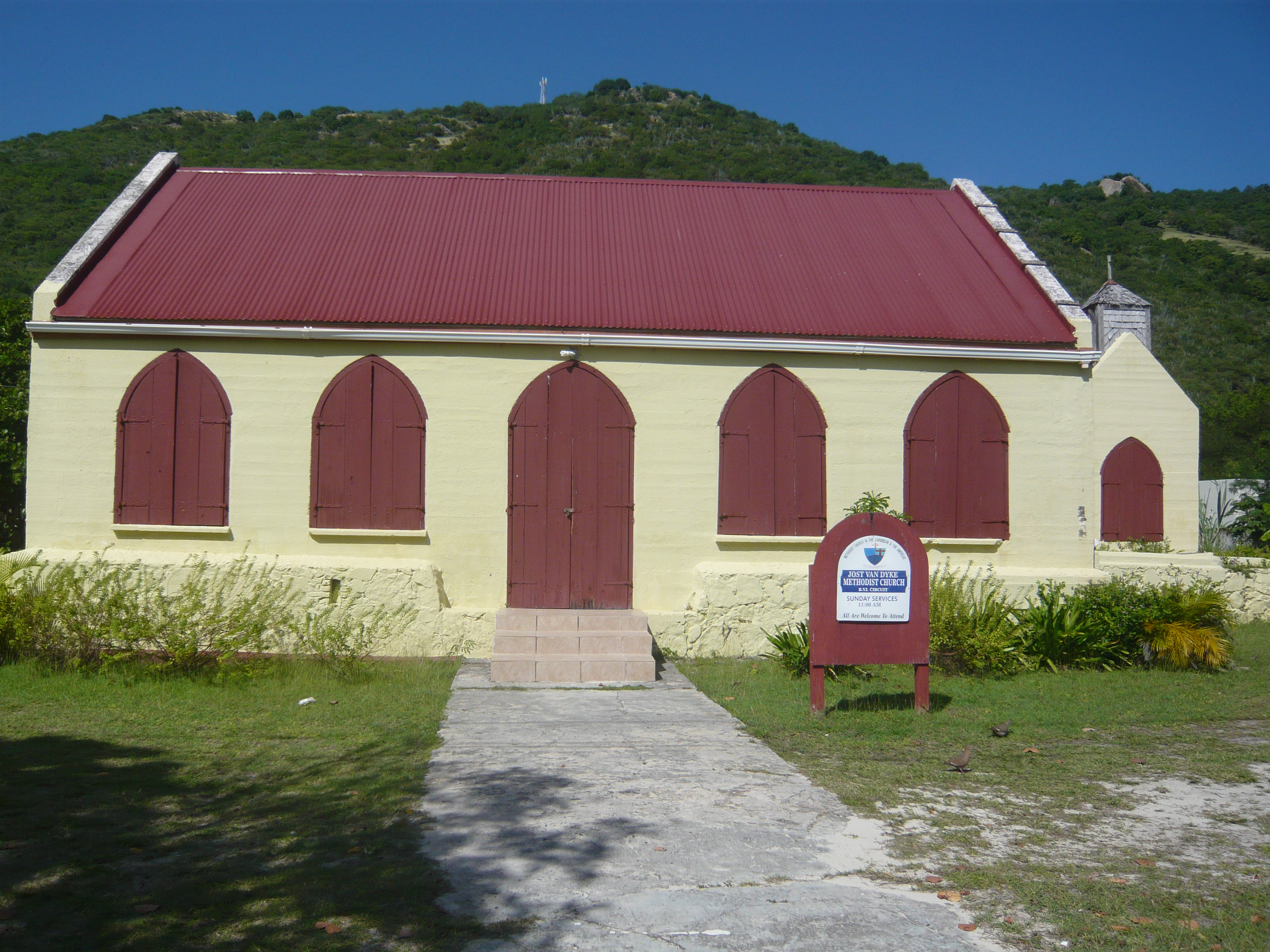
Jost Van Dyke Methodist Church in 2010

Jost Van Dyke Methodist Church in 2019, after Hurricane Irma

Over 90% of the population who indicated a religious affiliation at the 2010 Census were Christian, with the largest individual Christian denominations being Methodist (17.6%), Anglican (9.5%), Church of God (10.4%), Seventh-Day Adventists (9.0%) and Roman Catholic (8.9%). The largest non-Christian faiths in 2010 were Hinduism (1.9%) and Islam (0.9%). However, Hindus and Muslims constitute each approximately 1.2% of the population according to Word Religion Database 2005.

The Constitution of the British Virgin Islands commences with a professed national belief in God.

Religion by % of population (National Census 2010)
Denomination	2010	2001	1991
Methodist	17.6	22.7	32.9
Church of God	10.4	11.4	9.2
Anglican	9.5	11.6	16.7
Seventh Day Adventist	9.0	8.4	6.3
Roman Catholic	8.9	9.5	10.5
Pentecostal	8.2	9.1	4.1
None	7.9	6.4	3.6
Baptist	7.4	8.2	4.7
Other	4.1	3.4	4.4
Jehovah's Witnesses	2.5	2.2	2.1
Not stated	2.4	2.7	1.1
Hindu	1.9	2.0	2.2
Muslim	0.9	0.9	0.6
Evangelical	0.7	0.5	–
Rastafarian	0.6	0.4	0.2
Moravian	0.3	0.5	0.6
Presbyterian	0.2	0.4	0.7
Buddhist	0.2	–	–
Jewish	0.04	–	–
Bahai	0.04	0.03	0.00
Brethren	–	0.03	0.04
Salvation Army	–	0.03	0.04

=== Education ===
The British Virgin Islands operates several government schools. Private schools also operate. There is also a community college, H. Lavity Stoutt Community College, that is located on the eastern end of Tortola. This college was named after Lavity Stoutt, the first Chief Minister of the British Virgin Islands. There remains segregation in the school system; while BVIslander and Belonger children make up a significant proportion of pupils in private schools, Non-Belongers are prohibited from attending government schools. It is extremely common for students from the British Virgin Islands to travel overseas for secondary and tertiary education, either to the University of the West Indies, or to colleges and universities in either the United Kingdom, United States or Canada. Coaching in certain sports, such as athletics, squash and football is of a high level.

The literacy rate in the British Virgin Islands is high at 98%.

There is a University of the West Indies Open campus in the territory and a Marine Science educational facility.

== Culture ==
=== Music ===
The traditional music of the British Virgin Islands is called fungi after the local cornmeal dish with the same name, often made with okra. The special sound of fungi is due to a unique local fusion between African and European music. The fungi bands, also called "scratch bands", use instruments ranging from calabash, washboard, bongos and ukulele, to more traditional western instruments like keyboard, banjo, guitar, bass, triangle and saxophone. Apart from being a form of festive dance music, fungi often contains humorous social commentaries, as well as BVI oral history.

=== Media ===
The BVI has two weekly newspapers The Island Sun and The BVI Beacon. The first newspaper was The Tortola Newspaper, whose first edition was published on 28 February 1959.

=== Sport ===
Sailing is popular sport in the British Virgin Islands, where the local climate and coastal conditions are well suited to recreational sailing. The territory's sheltered waters and generally steady winds support a range of sailing activities.

Many sailing events are held in the waters of this country, the largest of which is a week-long series of races called the Spring Regatta, the premier sailing event of the Caribbean, with several races hosted each day. Boats include everything from full-size mono-hull yachts to dinghies. Captains and their crews come from all around the world to attend these races. The Spring Regatta is part race, part party, part festival. The Spring Regatta is normally held during the first week of April.

Since 2009, the BVI have made a name for themselves as a host of international basketball events. The BVI hosted three of the last four events of the Caribbean Basketball Championship (FIBA CBC Championship).

== See also ==
- List of British Virgin Islanders
- Outline of the British Virgin Islands
