= Districts of the British Virgin Islands =

== Administrative districts ==
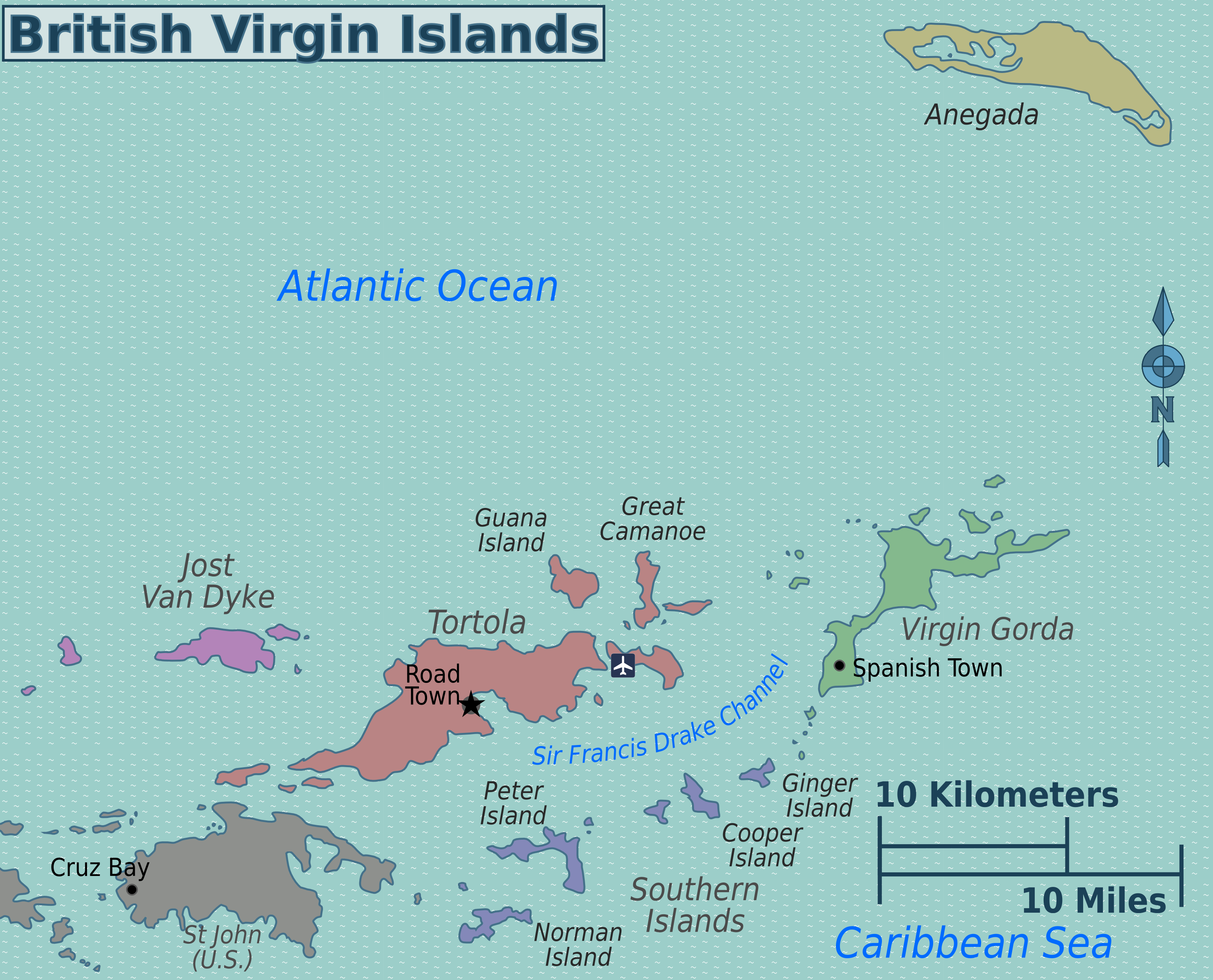

The five administrative subdivisions mentioned on some web pages are just statistical divisions, without any administrative relevance:

Subdivision	Main town	Area km^{2}	Population (2010 census)
Anegada	The Settlement	38.6	285
Jost Van Dyke	Belle Vue (Jost Van Dyke)	8.3	298
Tortola	Road Town	59.2	23,419
Virgin Gorda	Spanish Town	21.2	3,939
Other Islands	Great Harbour (Peter Island)	23.7	122
British Virgin Islands	Road Town	151.0	28,054

The "Other Islands" are mainly the islands south of Tortola (separated from it by the Sir Francis Drake Channel and southwest of Virgin Gorda and detached Ginger Island, mainly Norman Island, Peter Island, Cooper Island and Salt Island. These islands are also known under the informal name Little Sisters or Southern Islands.

The present-day Administrative Districts of the British Virgin Islands were established since 2003, following the provisions of the Sister Islands Programme, 2003.

Tortola, the surrounding islets, and the Little Sisters/Southern Islands are directly administered by the BVI Government, as an "Island". The 3 "Sister Islands", including the neighbouring islets, are administered through 3 Districts, run by District Officers, under the Deputy Governor of the BVI "in order to monitor, promote and facilitate the delivery of Government services to the sister islands of Virgin Gorda, Anegada, and Jost Van Dyke". This administrative setting is similar to that of some existing or former British dependencies - The Bahamas, Turks and Caicos Islands, or the Cook Islands - among others.

The Sister Islands Programme, 2003, establishes a Coordinator which works with, and supervises the District Officers, as a liaison with the central government. There are no local government structures in the Territory.

== Civil registry districts ==
There are six Civil Registry Districts in the British Virgin Islands:

Civil Registry District	Area
District A	Virgin Gorda
District B	Anegada
District C	East End (Tortola)
District D	Road Town (Tortola)
District E	West End (Tortola)
District F	Jost Van Dyke

Civil Registry Districts C, D and E are subdivisions of the main island Tortola.

== Electoral districts ==
- By the Constitution and Elections Ordinance 1954, which established a new Legislative Council with an elected majority, the presidency was divided into five districts. Road Town District (area of the capital) sent two members to the legislative council, the other districts one each.
- A new constitution of 1967 provided for seven electoral districts, with one representative per district.
- In 1977, the number of electoral districts was augmented to nine. Each electoral district sends a member to the Legislative Council, which has 13 seats (including four at large members).

Electoral District	Area
First	West End, Carrot Bay (Tortola)
Second	Meyers, Cane Garden Bay, Brewers Bay (Tortola) and Jost Van Dyke
Third	Sea Cow's Bay and surroundings (Tortola)
Fourth	Road Town and surroundings (Tortola)
Fifth	Hunthum's Ghut and Long Trench (Tortola)
Sixth	Baugher's Bay and East Central Tortola
Seventh	Long Look (Tortola) and Beef Island
Eighth	East End, Greenland and Hope Estate (Tortola)
Ninth	Virgin Gorda and Anegada
