= Little Sisters =

Coordinates: 18°21′35″N 64°32′26″W

overview map

The Little Sisters is an informal name for a group of some of the smaller islands of the British Virgin Islands, south of Tortola and southwest of Virgin Gorda. These islands are also called the Southern Islands.

- Norman Island
- Pelican Island
- Peter Island
- Salt Island
- Cooper Island
- Ginger Island
- Carvel Rock
- Dead Chest Island

Also included in the group are several smaller rocky outcroppings.

The closest thing to a formal endorsement of the term occurs in the Labour Code, 2010 (a British Virgin Islands statute) which includes a reference and statutory definition for the "Sister Islands", which the Code defines as meaning 'the islands of the Virgin Islands other than Tortola'.

== Gallery ==
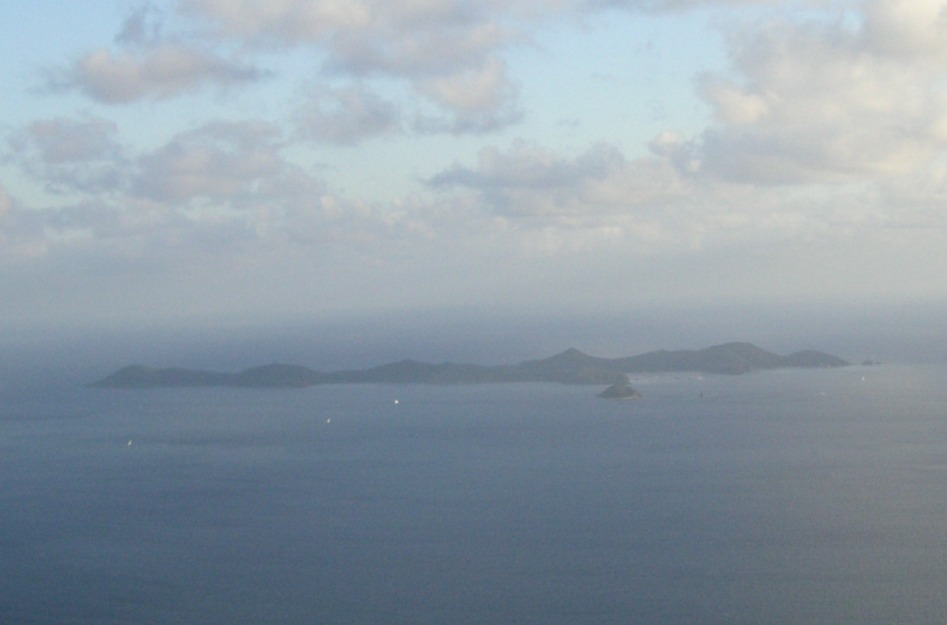
Norman Island

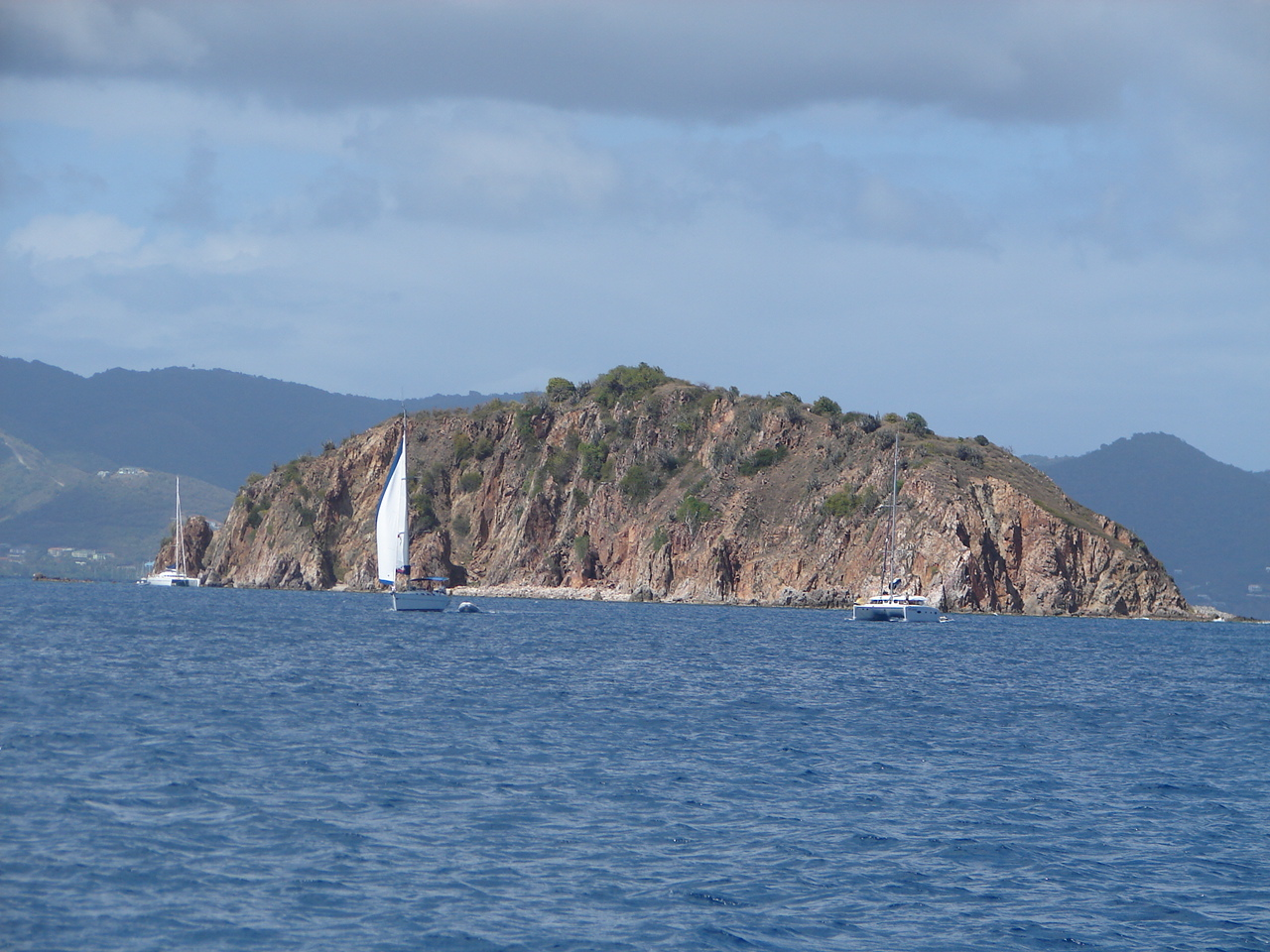
Pelican Island

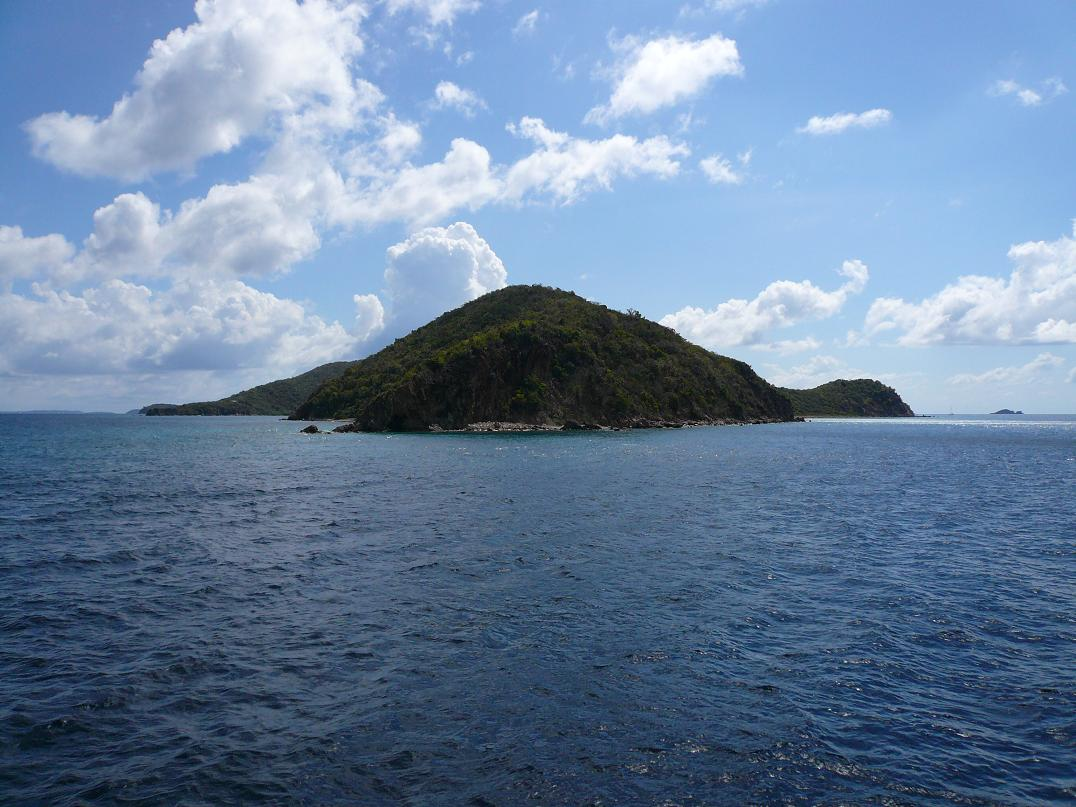
Peter Island

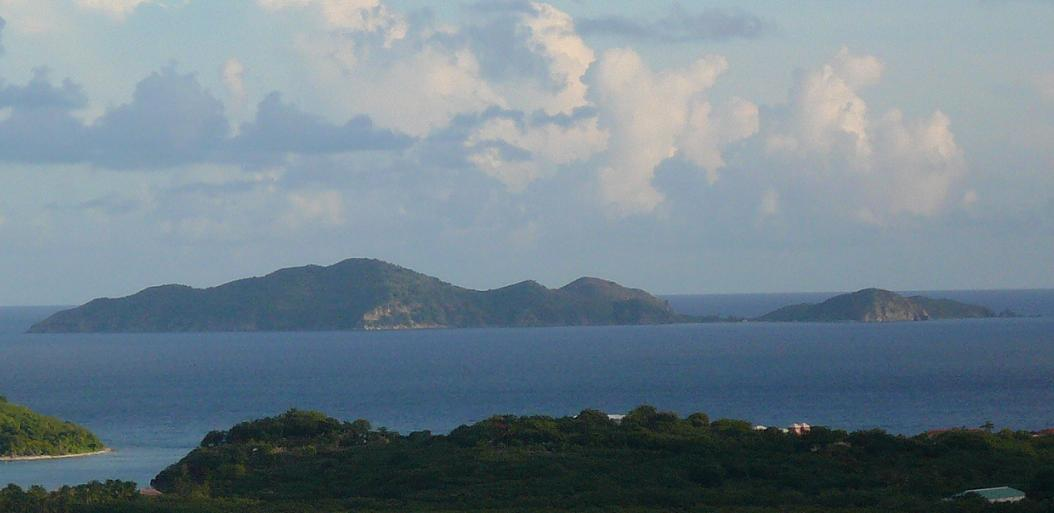
Salt Island

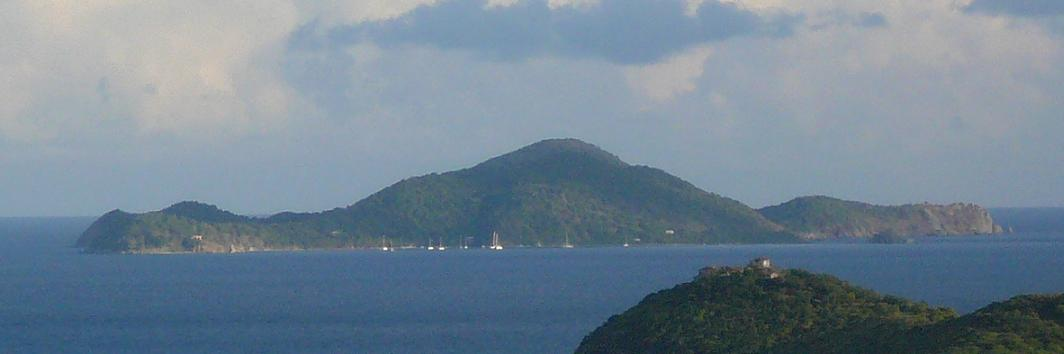
Cooper Island

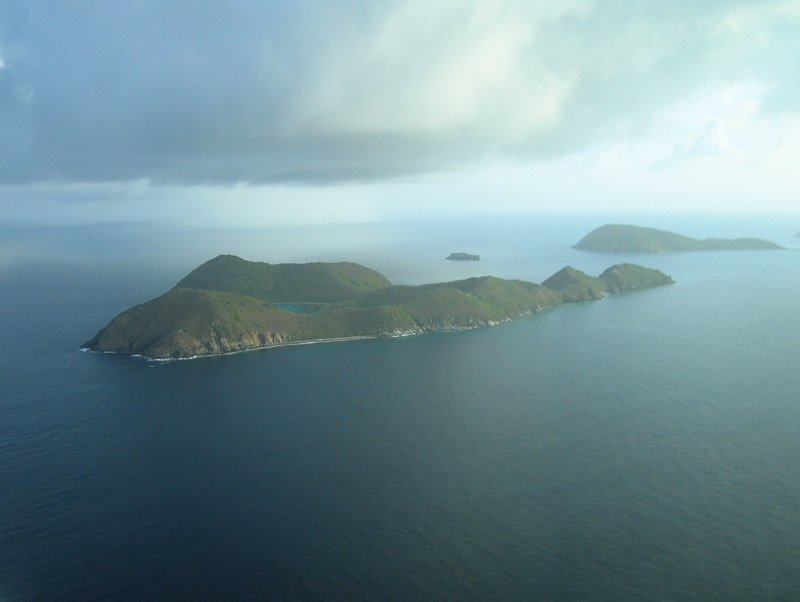
Ginger Island

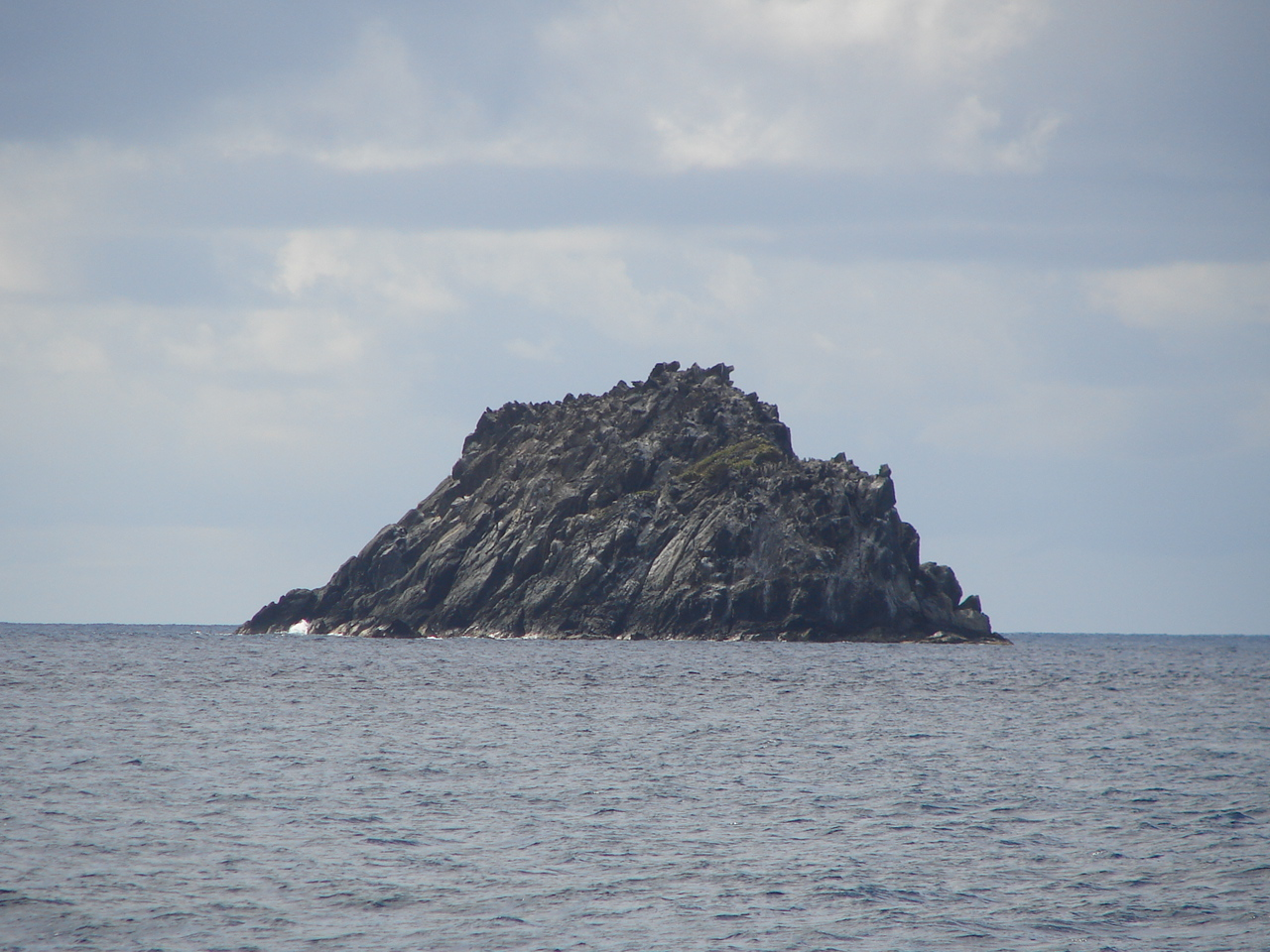
Carvel Rock

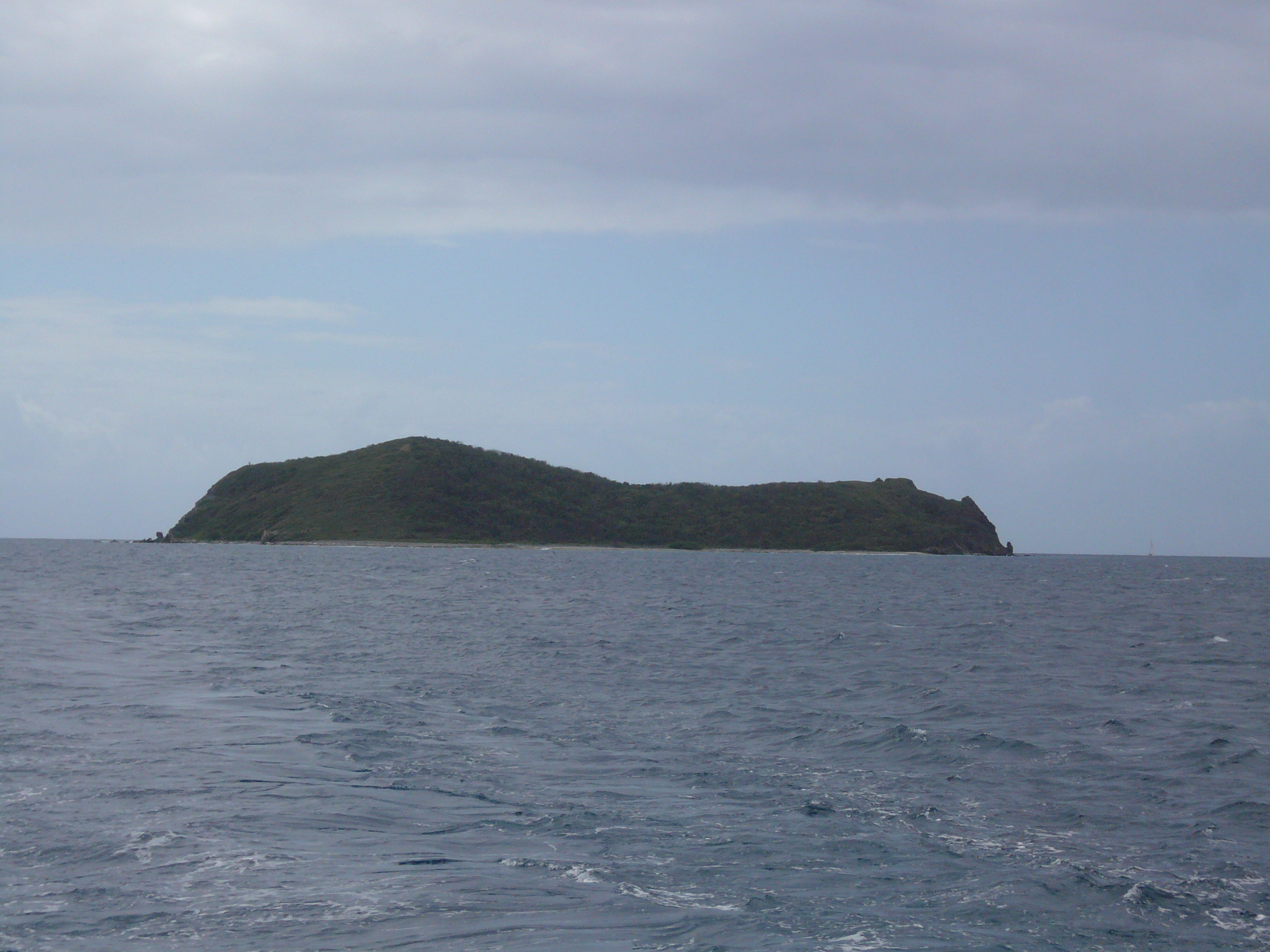
Dead Chest Island
