= Piracy in the British Virgin Islands =

Piracy in the Caribbean

Coordinates: 18.376921°N 64.686127°W

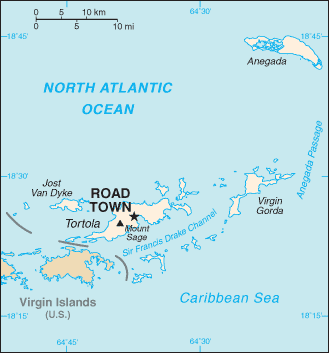
The Virgin Islands

Piracy in the British Virgin Islands was prevalent during the so-called "Golden Age of Piracy", mainly during the years of 1690-1730. Privateering was also widely practised in the jurisdiction throughout frequent colonial wars, not least by emancipated slaves who, in preference to back-breaking labour in the fields for pitiful wages, took enormous risks to capture fortunes on the seas with the sanction of the Crown. In 1808, Patrick Colquhoun, a prize agent for the Territory spoke of "the most daring outrages which are frequently committed by people of colour."

== History ==
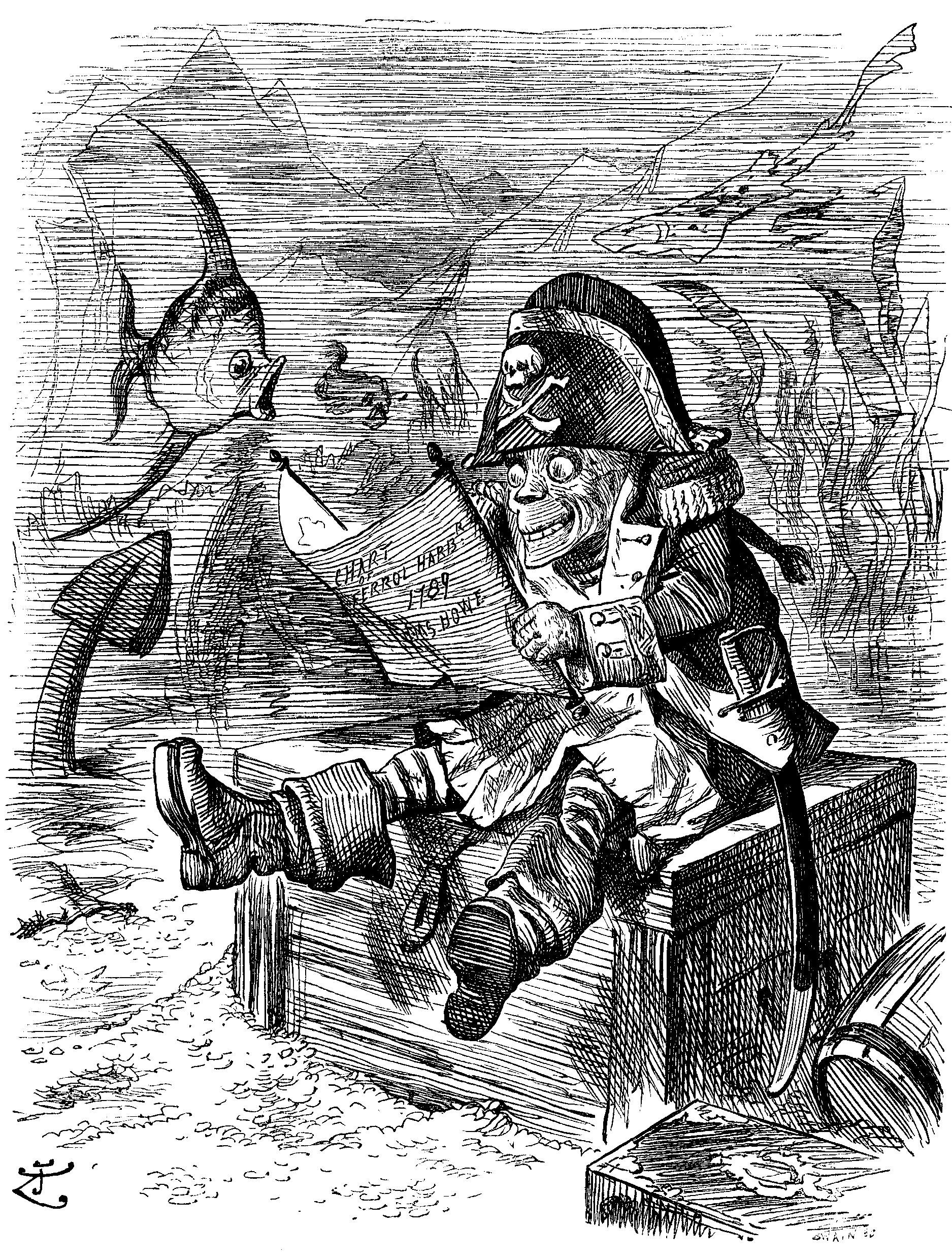
A punch of Davy Jones's Locker

Little is formally recorded relating to the actual piratical activities that took place in the British Virgin Islands, simply because of the nature of the activity. Whilst Royal Naval and merchant vessels of the period were required to write accurate accounts of their voyage known as "The Log", it was within the best interests of a vessel engaged in piracy to keep their activities as secret as possible. In the event of capture, the log of pirate vessel would almost certainly be enough to consign the crew to the gallows so consequently, no records were kept.

=== All In A Name ===
This does not detract however from the certain fact that pirate vessels would have used the Virgin Islands as a place to hide and recuperate after their activities at sea. The mass of islands and inlets that make up the physical terrain of the Virgin Islands would have been perfect for avoiding detection and would have given the pirates a chance to refit their ships, ready for their next voyage 'on the account.' The names of places in the British Virgin Islands indicates that this would have been the case. "Freebooters Point" on Anegada leaves little to the imagination and on an old sea chart of the Territory, marked under the former name, is written the legend 'so called by ye Freebooters from the gold and silver supposed to be buried there after the wreck of a Spanish galleon.'

Norman Island is reputed to be named after Captain Norman, a pirate who was eventually apprehended and hanged by the Spanish Guarda Costas, the historical coast guard for Puerto Rico.

Bellamy Cay, now home to the popular restaurant/bar "The Last Resort", is named after Samuel Bellamy, a noted pirate who captured over 50 vessels in just over a year. During much of his short career, he used this islet (then named Blanco Islet) as his base of operations, relying on the protection of the surrounding bay while maintaining their fleet of ships. Bellamy soon learned that from this location, ships could be seen (and then ambushed) while sailing through the Sir Francis Drake Channel – named for the famed privateer, Sir Francis Drake.

Just over the headland, on Beef Island lies Hamm's Creek, named after a known associate of Captain William Kidd, who eventually renounced his former life of piracy with the famous captain and settled on Beef Island.

=== Fifteen Men On The Dead Man’s Chest ===
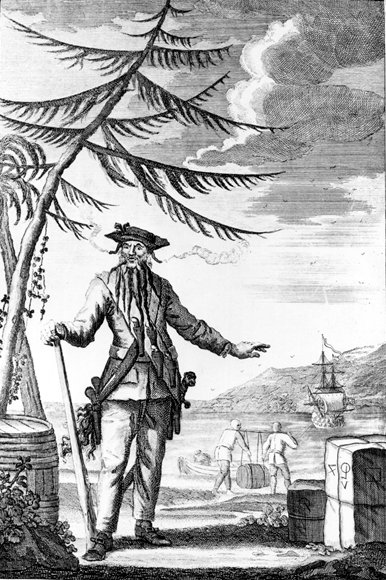
The famed Captain Blackbeard

Along with the facts we find a certain amount of legend, the most famous of which is probably the Territory's association with the famous pirate Blackbeard. Blackbeard was known by a number of names including Edward Teach, Tatch, and Thatch. There are two "Thatch" islands in the BVI (Great Thatch and Little Thatch) and almost directly opposite Road Harbour is the island known as 'Deadchest,' where Blackbeard allegedly marooned a number of his men giving the island its name. These men were supposed to have tried to swim to the adjacent Peter Island but drowned, hence the name 'Dead Man's Bay' on Peter Island.

The reality is that there is no documentary evidence to support any of this and academically speaking, there is no proof to show that Blackbeard ever sailed through the Virgin Islands. It is known that Blackbeard did maroon some of his pirates but this happened in the Bahamas and not the Virgin Islands. More conclusive is the fact that a map from the early 18th century shows that Dead Chest Island was known by this name far earlier than when Blackbeard was operating, which was only between the years 1716-18.

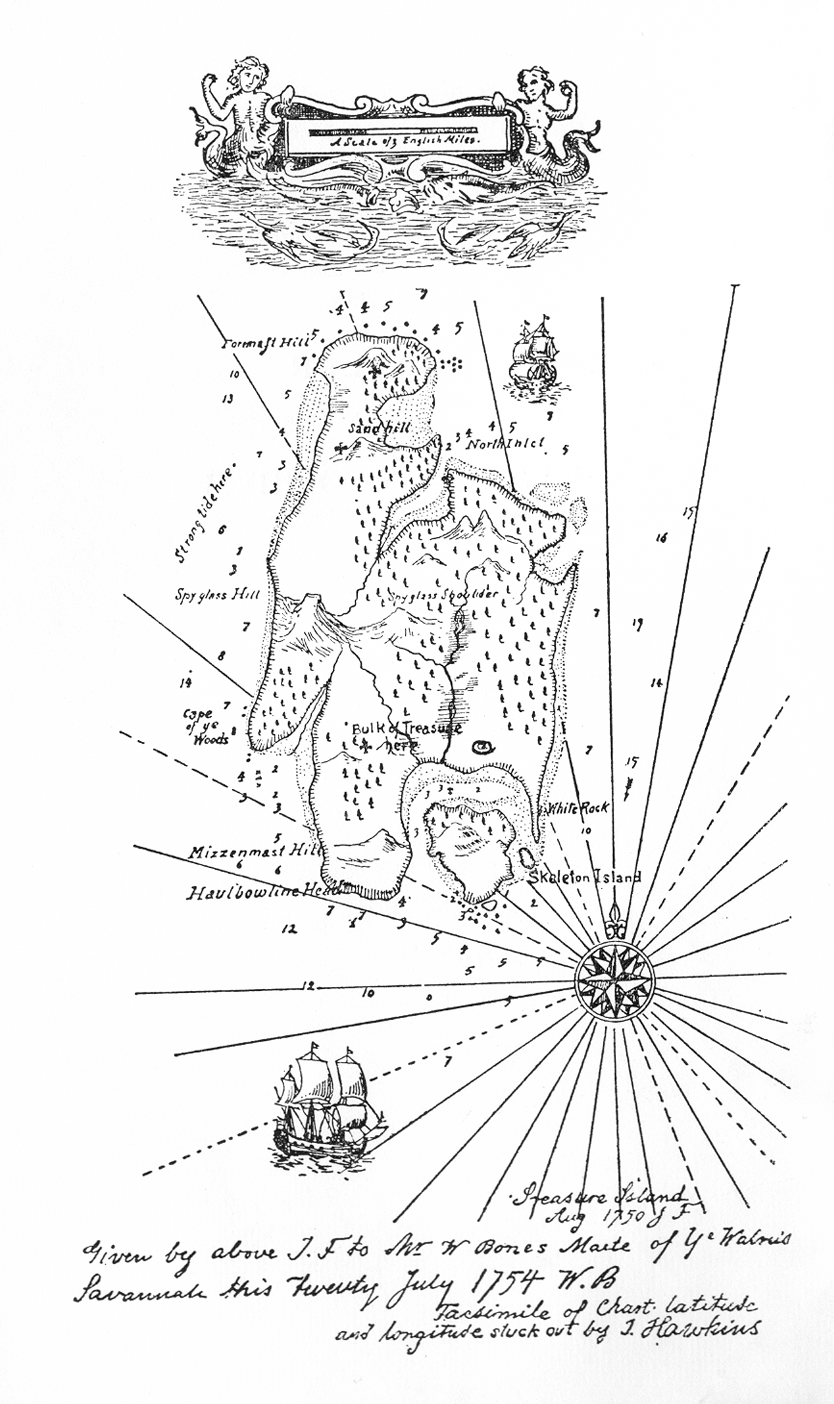
Treasure Island map from the book

=== Treasure Island ===
The Blackbeard myth was perpetuated in the BVI when Robert Louis Stevenson wrote his now famous book Treasure Island. In the book is the famous song mentioning 'Deadchest' and some suggest that Stevenson based his Treasure Island on Norman Island. Included on his Treasure Island is a hill known as 'Spyglass Hill' which is actually the highest peak on Norman Island. However, there are many rival claimants as the inspiration for the eponymous island. The reality is though that whilst researching his book, Stevenson probably chose a group of islands that suited his story from a sea chart. He would most likely have taken their names and adapted them for his own purpose. His diaries show that he never visited the BVI, and the BVI claim is largely based upon a "seafaring uncle" having recounted the story of the Nuestra Señora de Guadalupe to a young Robert Louis Stevenson.

Acts of piracy were committed in the BVI and the documentary resource proves this. In 1685, a Spanish pirate vessel called the Longue attacked Tortola and captured an English sloop and its crew of eight, one of whom was killed. In the following year, another Spanish pirate expedition which was in fact led by an English Doctor, attacked, invaded, and held Tortola for a number of days. Plantations were pillaged and the Deputy Governor's son, Thomas Bisse, was held captive and physically abused. Damage estimated at £3,977.00 was committed which was enough for the juvenile colony to collapse.

=== Nuestra Señora de Guadalupe ===
Probably the most famous historical account of piracy involved Owen Lloyd, who was part of the crew on a Spanish treasure galleon named Nuestra Señora de Guadalupe. In 1750, the ship was forced to seek shelter from a storm on the North Carolina coast, when, at the instigation of the first mate, the crew mutinied and escaped with the galleon's valuable cargo. Part of the cargo was loaded into two bilanders, one of which was commanded by Owen Lloyd. Lloyd and his associates then proceeded to St. Croix where they off loaded part of their plunder.

They then proceeded to Norman Island where the rest was stashed. Lloyd and his party then escaped to St. Eustatius where they were finally apprehended. Meanwhile, on Tortola, news had broken that this treasure existed and at the instigation of the acting President of the Colony, Abraham Chalwill, a group of prominent planters made their way to Norman Island and recovered the treasure. They divided the booty but were unable to enjoy their success for long. On hearing about the treasure, Gilbert Flemming, then Lieutenant Governor of all of the British Leeward Islands, promptly dispatched a British warship to recover the treasure from the island's planters. Fleming persuaded Chalwill (who had led the search for the treasure on Norman Island) to issue a proclamation whereby the treasure would be returned and the people who had dug it up would receive a one-third share as a reward. Reports of the content of the cargo vary - wilder accounts talk of chests of silver, more sober academic accounts suggest it was silks and spices.

Norman Island has also been the subject of many local rumours, which may well be connected with the story of Nuestra Señora de Guadalupe. One of the more famous ones relates to a member of the Chalwell family had been fishing near Norman Island in 1915 and took shelter in one of the caves on the Western coast of Norman Island during a storm. The surge repeatedly banged his small boat against the walls of the cave, whilst the storm surge caused the water level to rise several feet. When the fortunate fisherman woke the next morning, a large number of rocks had broken off into his small craft, as had a small chest, supposedly filled with gold doubloons. The story cannot be verified as no legal application for treasure trove was ever made, but it is known that members of the family ceased being fisherman and left Tortola at about the time to open some shops in Charlotte Amalie in St. Thomas. It is also asserted that when the first son of the fisherman in the tale got married, he gave his new daughter in law a necklace of Spanish dubloons that hung down to her knees on her wedding day.

== Letters of marque ==
This was done and a percentage was given to the planters as compensation. The receipt showing what was taken from each planter and what was rewarded still exists in England and a copy is held on Tortola. Piracy was also practised by BVIslanders during both the Seven Years' War and the American War of Independence. During both of these conflicts, to boost the standing navy of the British Empire, Letters of marque were issued to Caribbean planters whose vessels then became known as privateers.

A letter of marque is basically written permission for a private vessel to arm itself and attack enemy shipping, condoned by the privateer's home government. Once captured, any enemy vessel would be subjected to what was known as a Vice Court of Admiralty, generally held on the island the privateer originated from. This was the case on Tortola, however, planters weren't necessarily just choosing enemy vessels and were sometimes attacking vessels from neutral countries. As these vessels were in fact not at war with England, the Letter of Marque became obsolete and the act committed constituted piracy.

=== Privateering ===
The British Virgin Islanders attacked enough neutral vessels to have their Letters of Marque and Vice Court of Admiralty dissolved and weren't allowed privateering status again. The last recorded episode of piracy in the BVI took place as late as 1869 and involved a vessel called the Telegrafo. The vessel was detained at Tortola on charges of piracy but orders were issued for her release by the Governor because the legal system was unable to deal with such a case.

The 'Golden Era' of piracy for the most part took place during the first quarter of the 18th Century and has left a legacy that perpetuates the history of the BVI.
