= Buck Island (British Virgin Islands) =

Privately owned island in the Caribbean

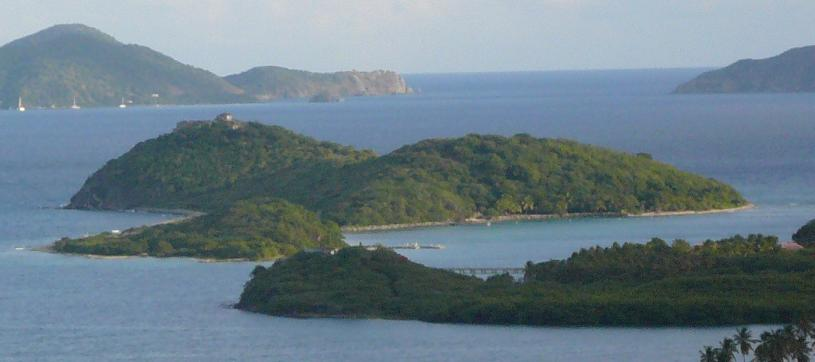
- Buck Island, British Virgin Islands

- The location of Buck Island within the British Virgin Islands

- Location within British Virgin Islands Location within the Caribbean

Geography
- Location: Caribbean Sea
- Coordinates: 18.424°N 64.558°W
- Archipelago: Virgin Islands

Administration
- United Kingdom; British Virgin Islands
- British Overseas Territory: British Virgin Islands

Additional information
- Time zone: AST (UTC-4)
- ISO code: VG

Buck Island is a privately owned island of the British Virgin Islands in the Caribbean.

== History ==
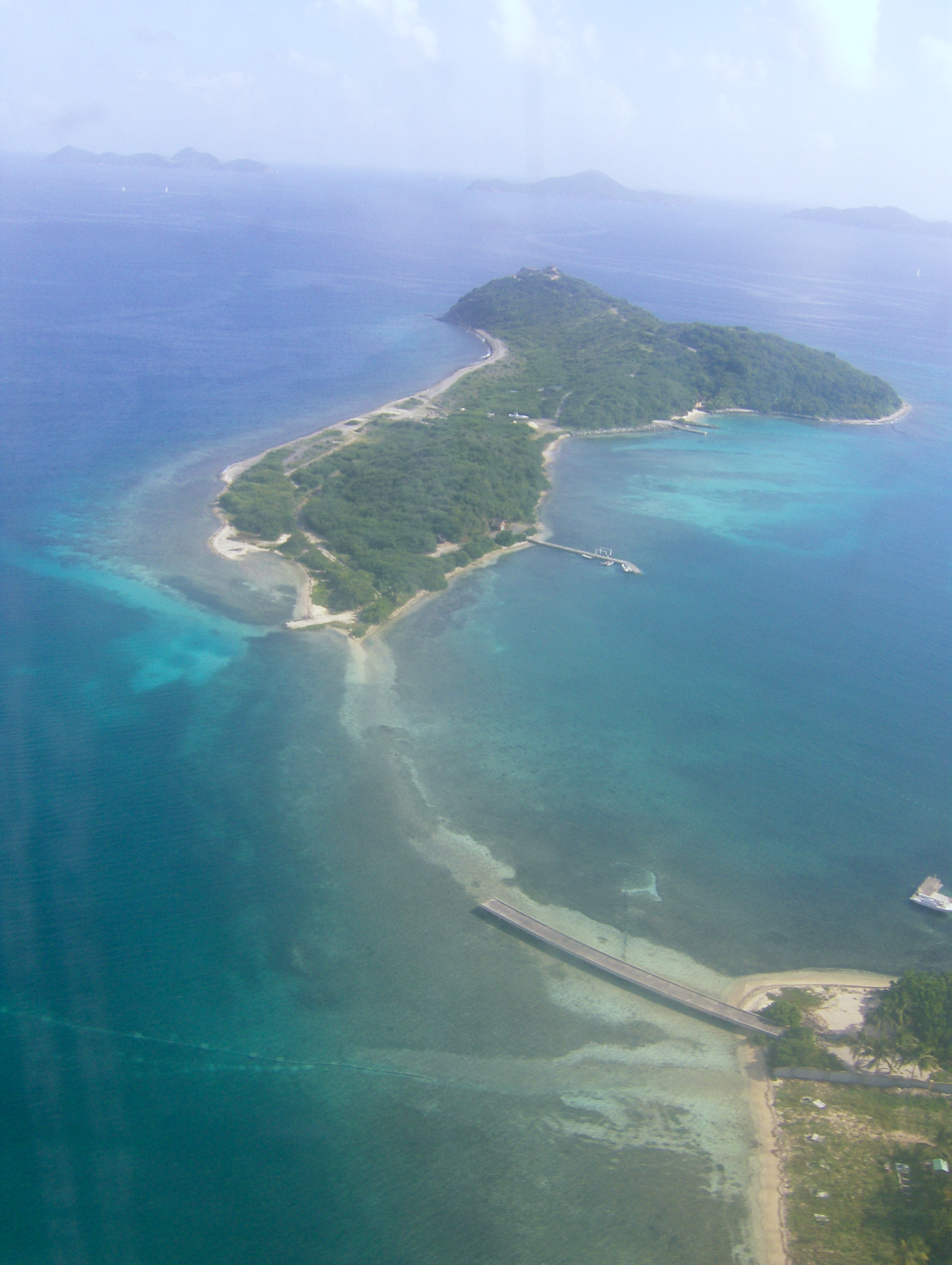
Aerial view of Buck Island, with, from left to right, Ginger Island, Cooper Island and Salt Island on the horizon

Buck Island was purchased and developed by Carl & Sharon Nilsen from 1998 to 2008. Hurricane Irma and Maria hit the British Virgin Islands in 2017 causing considerable damage to the territory. The island has a long strip of flat land which was the BVI's first airstrip.
