= List of towns in the British Virgin Islands =

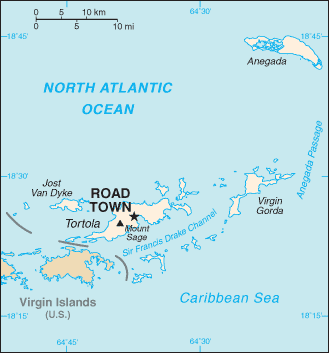
Map of the British Virgin Islands showing Road Town on the main island Tortola.

This is a list of towns in the British Virgin Islands, there are no cities in the British Virgin Islands. The capital, and the largest town is Road Town. No sources have been identified that provide population figures for other settlements. However, East End in Tortola appears to be the second largest settlement. Spanish Town may be the third largest town. The main island is Tortola, where most of the towns are.

Name of town	Island
East End-Long Look	Tortola
Belle Vue	Jost Van Dyke
Great Harbour	Other Islands
Road Town	Tortola
Spanish Town	Virgin Gorda
The Settlement	Anegada

These are the settlements of the British Virgin Islands:

- Belmont
- Creek Village
- East End-Long Look
- Great Harbour
- Great Harbour
- Kingstown
- Long Look Estate
- Peter Island Resort
- Road Town
- Spanish Town
- The Settlement
- West End
