= Lesser Antilles =

Archipelago in the Southeast Caribbean

Lesser Antilles Kleine Antillen (Dutch) Petites Antilles (French) Antiyas Minores (Papiamento) Antillas Menores (Spanish) Tibannzil Lézantiy (Saint Lucian Creole French)
- Region
- Location within the Caribbean (black outline)

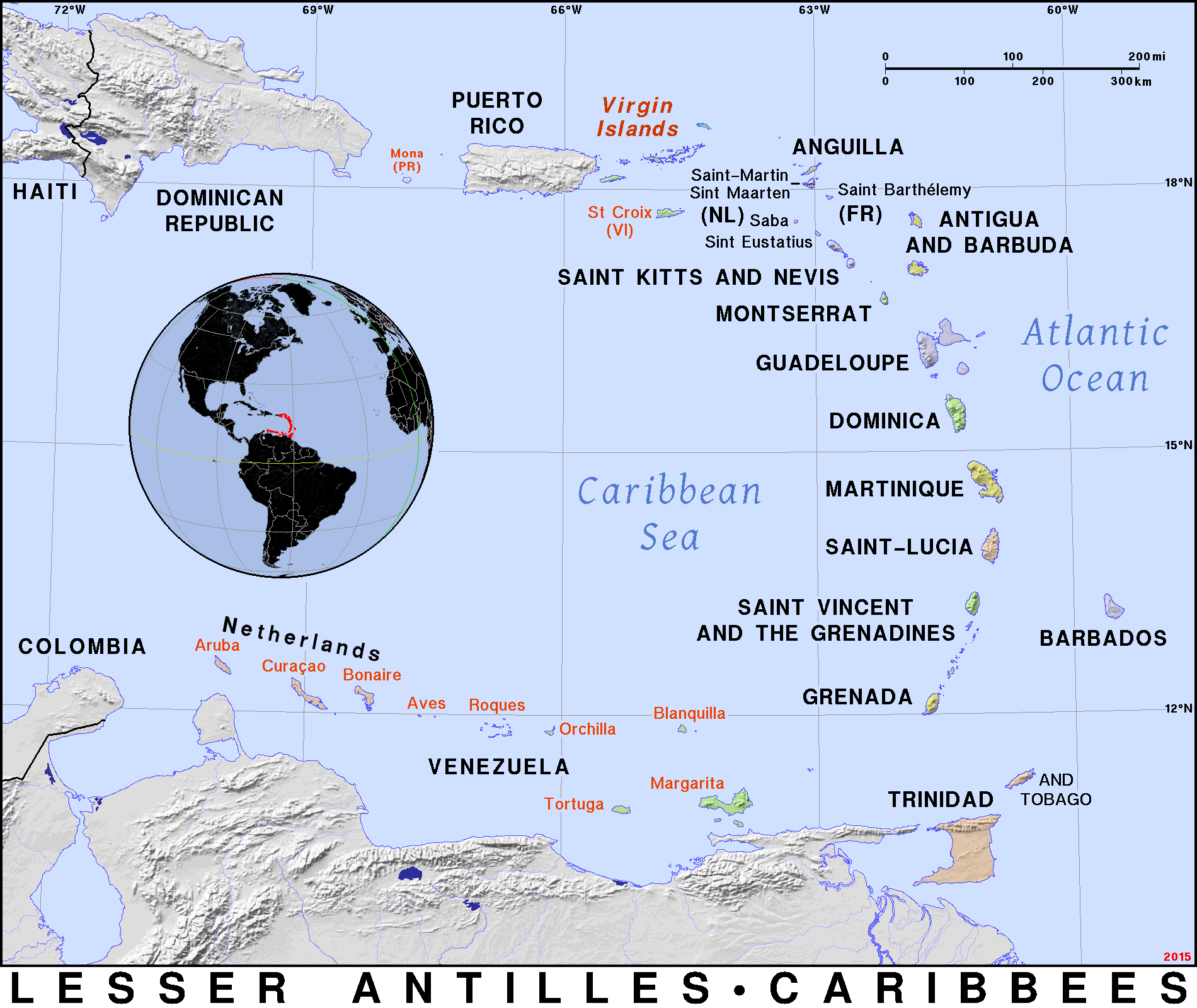
- Map of the Lesser Antilles
- Coordinates: 14°N 61°W
- Region: Caribbean
- Island states: 24: Trinidad and Tobago; Antigua and Barbuda; Aruba (NL); Barbados; Bonaire (NL); British Virgin Islands (UK); Curaçao (NL); Dominica; Grenada; Federal Dependencies of Venezuela (VE); Guadeloupe (FR); Martinique (FR); Montserrat (UK); Nueva Esparta (VE); Saba (NL); Saint Barthélemy (FR); Saint Kitts and Nevis; Saint Lucia; Saint Martin (FR); Saint Vincent and the Grenadines; Sint Eustatius (NL); Sint Maarten (NL); (Culebra, Puerto Rico) / (Vieques, Puerto Rico) Spanish Virgin Islands (PR); Anguilla (UK); United States Virgin Islands (US)
- Largest city: Willemstad

Area
  - Total: 14,364 km^{2} (5,546 sq mi)

Population (2009)
  - Total: 3,949,250
  - Density: 274.9/km^{2} (712/sq mi)
- Demonym: Lesser Antillean
- Time zone: UTC−4 (AST)
  - Summer (DST): UTC−3 (ADT)

The Lesser Antilles is a group of islands at the edge of the Caribbean Sea, forming part of the West Indies in the Caribbean region of the Americas. They are distinguished from the larger islands of the Greater Antilles to the west. They form an arc which begins east of Puerto Rico at the archipelago of the Virgin Islands, swings southeast through the Leeward and Windward Islands towards South America, and turns westward through the Leeward Antilles along the Venezuelan coast.

Most of the islands are part of a long, partially volcanic island arc between the Greater Antilles and the continent of South America. The islands form the eastern boundary of the Caribbean Sea where it meets the Atlantic Ocean. Together, the Lesser Antilles and the Greater Antilles make up the Antilles. The Antilles together with the Lucayan Archipelago are collectively known as the West Indies.

Compared to the Greater Antilles, which was settled by several peoples, including the Taíno, the islands' dominant Indigenous peoples were the Kalinago. The boundary set between them is known as the "poison arrow curtain," named after the Kalinago's favoured weapon for fending off Europeans that came to conquer the islands in the 16th century.

The archipelago is politically divided into eight sovereign states—all of which were formerly part of the British Empire—and 17 non-sovereign, partly self-governing dependencies of France, the Netherlands, the United Kingdom, the United States, or Venezuela.

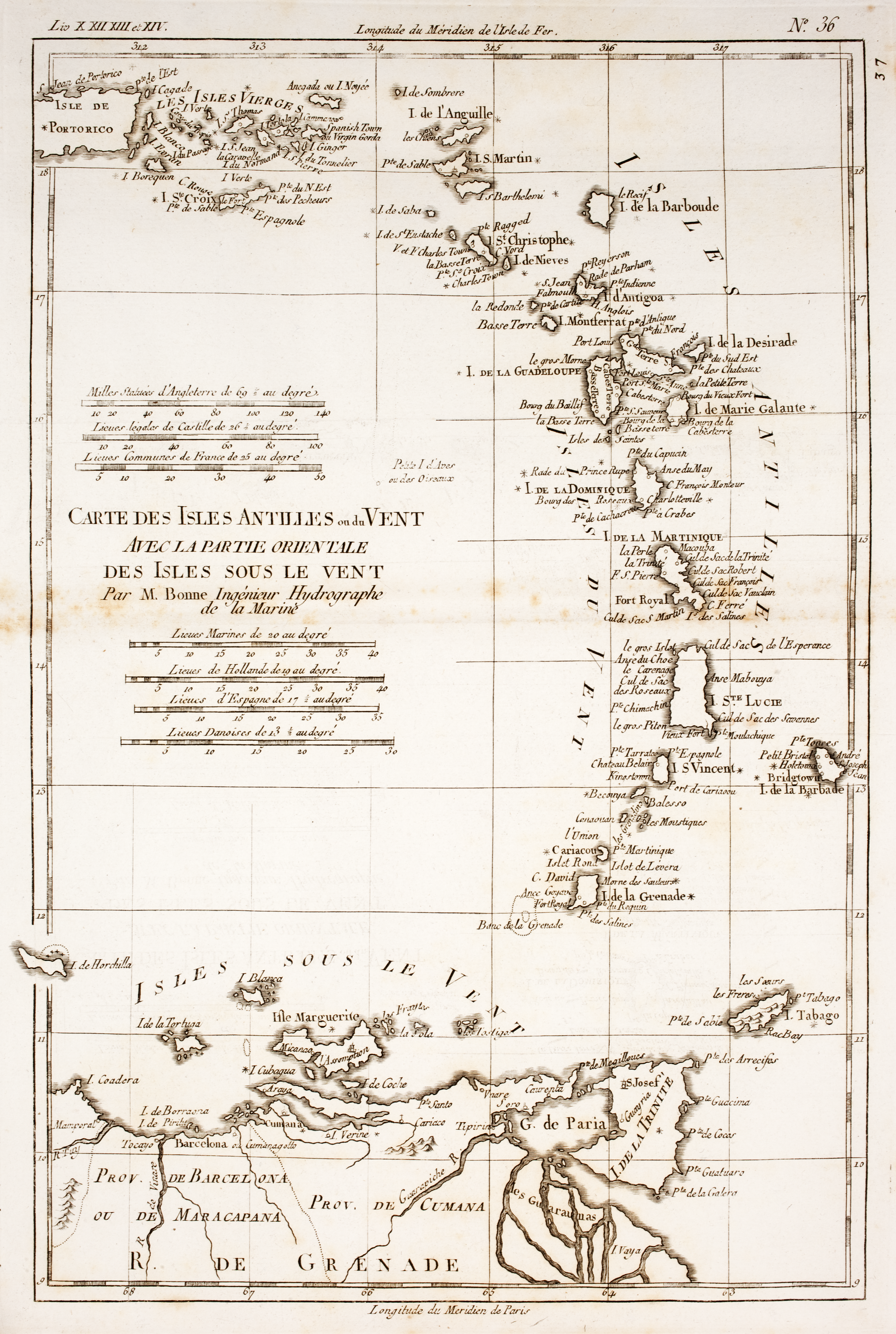
A map of the Lesser Antilles, 1780

== History ==
=== Archaic Age ===
The earliest Archaic Age habitation is evidenced at archaeological sites like St. John and Banwari Trace in Trinidad, dating between 7700 and 6100 B.P. Artifacts from this period include stone and bone tools used for hunting and fishing. A total of 29 Archaic Age sites have been identified in Trinidad and Tobago, associated with the Ortoiroid people, divided into the Banwarian (5000–2500 BC) and Ortoiran (1500–300 BC) subseries. During the Late Archaic Age, wild plant foods became more significant, with evidence of early plant management, including crops such as maize, sweet potatoes, achira, and chili peppers had been imported and cultivated from the continent.

The archaeological record for the rest of the southern Lesser Antilles is sparse, with sites in Tobago, Barbados, and Martinique yielding potential Archaic Age artifacts. Factors like local tectonic activity and hurricanes or other storms have likely distorted the archaeological evidence in these regions. Entire islands may now be submerged. Severe erosion, landslides, and volcanic eruptions are fairly common and may contribute to the preservation of archaeological sites.

Three migration scenarios have been proposed. First, Archaic Age communities from South America reached Trinidad, Tobago, and Barbados. Second, the southern Lesser Antilles (Windward Islands) were bypassed by early settlers, with migration directly to the northern islands. Third, technological diffusion occurred without significant population movement from northeastern South America.

Chronometric data divide the Archaic Age in the northern Lesser Antilles into three phases: Early Archaic Age (3300–2600 BC), Middle Archaic Age (2600–800 BC), and Late Archaic Age (800 BC–AD 100). Coastal areas were favored for settlement, particularly for their proximity to marine resources and flint quarries. Material culture showing reliance on seafood (fish and mollusks) and terrestrial animals. Antigua and St. Martin seem to be the most heavily populated during the Archaic Age.

Notably, all known Archaic Age sites are in the northern islands, with no evidence in the Windward Islands south of Guadeloupe. Trinidad, Tobago, and Barbados are exceptions, likely colonized separately from South America. Sites in the Lesser Antilles were established on small islands and in coastal settings; most habitations were temporary and small, suggesting annual mobility for resource procurement. Despite similarities, each site displayed differences in the consumption of marine species and variety of shell and coral tools. Each site showed diverse adaptations to locally available resources and/or activity patterns.

=== Neolithic period ===
Archaeological findings, including Huecoid and Saladoid pottery, provide radiocarbon dates for Early Ceramic Age sites, pointing to an initial sphere of interaction between coastal South America and the northern Lesser Antilles that started around 400–200 BC. The discovery of Saladoid pottery in Puerto Rico and the northern Lesser Antilles is understood as a result of exploratory activities, cultural exchanges, and gradual migrations from the mainland during the Archaic Age. This process involved the interaction of local communities with established insular societies, creating a web of dynamic social relationships. However, debates and controversies has occurred over conflicting stratigraphic data, radiocarbon dates, and stylistic difference of the potteries.

=== European arrival ===
The Spanish were the first Europeans to arrive on the islands with the arrival of Christopher Columbus. In 1493, on his second voyage, Columbus reached the coast of the Caribbean Sea, where he sailed to discover several islands of the Lesser Antilles archipelago. He called the first island he discovered on this trip the Deseada. The Spanish claimed the island of Dominica and took solemn possession on the land of the island they called Marigalante. They then anchored next to the island they called Guadeloupe. Later they visited Montserrat, Antigua and San Cristobal (Saint Kitts). They then crossed the archipelago of the Eleven Thousand Virgins. Over the next centuries, the Spanish, French, Dutch, Danish and English fought over several of the islands.

French merchant Pierre Belain d'Esnambuc sailed to the Caribbean in 1625, hoping to establish a French settlement on the island of Saint Christopher (Saint Kitts). In 1626 the French began to take an interest in Guadeloupe, driving out the Spanish colonists. In 1635, Spain had ceded Martinique to France after 133 years of Spanish control, and Belain established the first permanent French colony, Saint-Pierre, on Martinique. Belain claimed Martinique for the French King Louis XIII and the "Compagnie des Îles de l'Amérique".

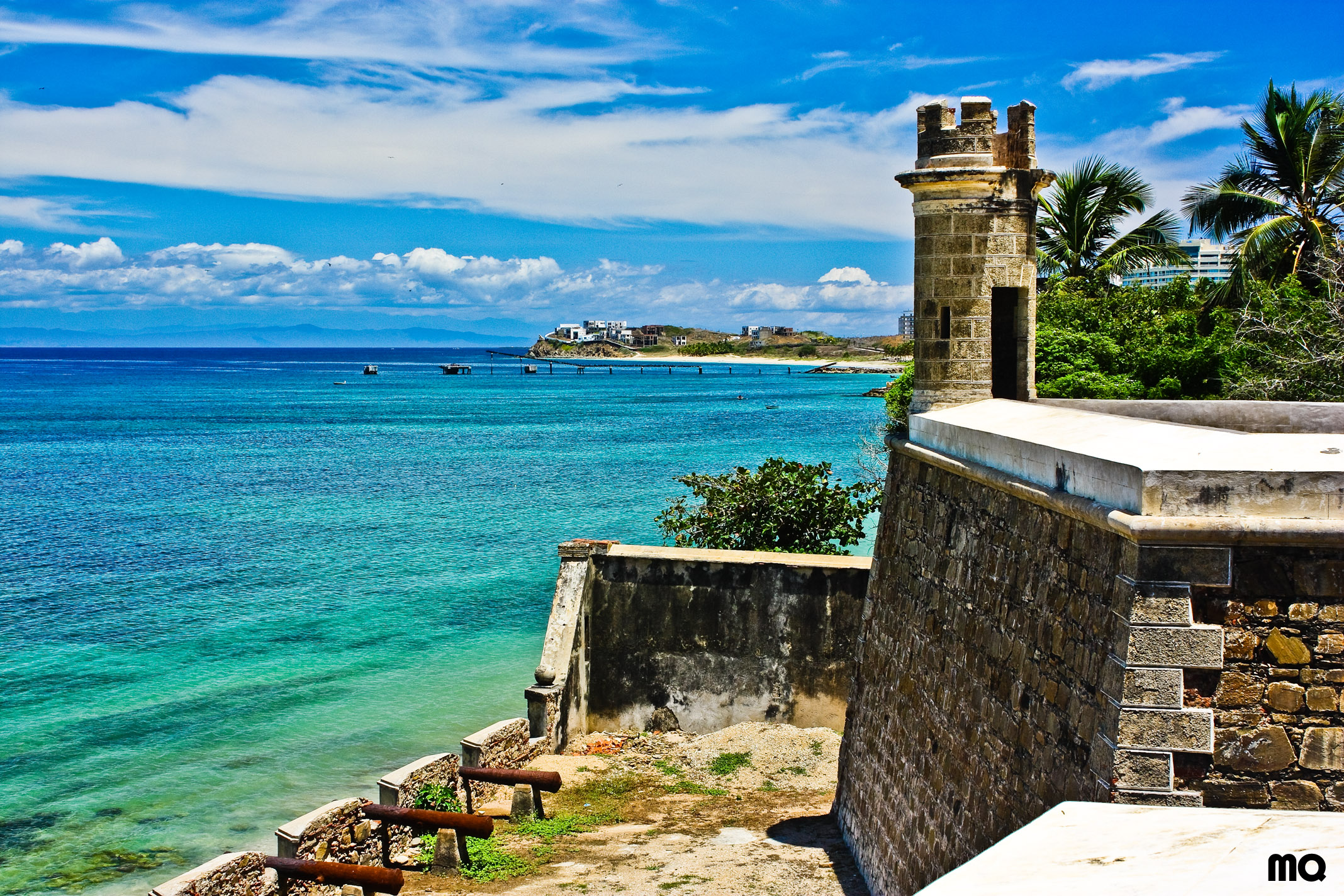
A Spanish colonial castle on Margarita Island, Nueva Esparta, Venezuela

Margarita Island was discovered on 15 August 1498 during Columbus' third voyage. Columbus spotted three islands, two of them small, low and arid (present day Coche and Cubagua). On that trip the admiral also discovered the mainland at Venezuela.

The province of Trinidad was created in the 16th century by the Spanish, and its capital was San José de Oruña. In 1797 during the Napoleonic Wars, a British force began occupying the territory. And in 1802 Spain recognized the British sovereignty.

In 1917 the United States bought the Danish West Indies. Most of the British colonies became independent states, the islands of the Lesser Antilles belonging to Venezuela were divided into 2 different entities the State of Nueva Esparta and the Federal Dependencies (1938). In 1986 Aruba seceded from the Netherlands Antilles, officially becoming a country of the Kingdom of the Netherlands. In 2010 the rest of the Netherlands Antilles was dissolved to form smaller entities.

On July 18, 1995, the previously dormant Soufrière Hills volcano on the southern part of Montserrat became active. The eruptions destroyed the capital of Plymouth. Between 1995 and 2000, two-thirds of the island's population was forced to flee, mainly to the UK, leaving less than 1,200 people on the island in 1997 (rising to almost 5,000 by 2016).

The two official French overseas departments are Guadeloupe and Martinique. St. Martin and St. Barthélemy, formerly part of the department of Guadeloupe, have had a separate status as overseas entities since 2007.

== Geography ==
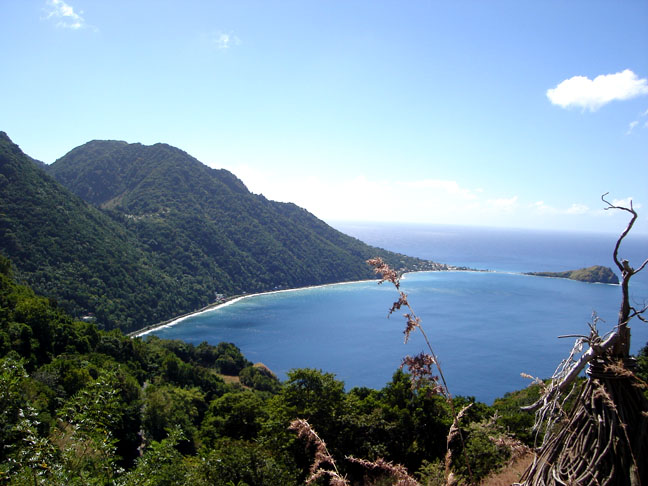
The southern tip of Dominica

The islands of the Lesser Antilles are divided into three groups: the Windward Islands in the south, the Leeward Islands in the north, and the Leeward Antilles in the west. The Windward Islands are so called because they were more windward to sailing ships arriving in the New World than the Leeward Islands, given that the prevailing trade winds blow east to west. The trans-Atlantic currents and winds that provided the fastest route across the ocean brought these ships to the rough dividing line between the Windward and Leeward Islands.

The Leeward Antilles consist of the Dutch ABC islands just off the coast of Venezuela, plus a group of Venezuelan islands.

=== Geology ===
The Lesser Antilles more or less coincide with the outer cliff of the Caribbean plate. Many of the islands were formed as a result of the subduction of oceanic crust of the South American plate under the Caribbean plate in the Lesser Antilles subduction zone. This process is ongoing and is responsible for many of the islands as well as the volcanic and earthquake activity in the region. The islands along the South American coast are largely the result of the interaction of the South American plate and the Caribbean plate which is mainly strike-slip but includes a component of compression.

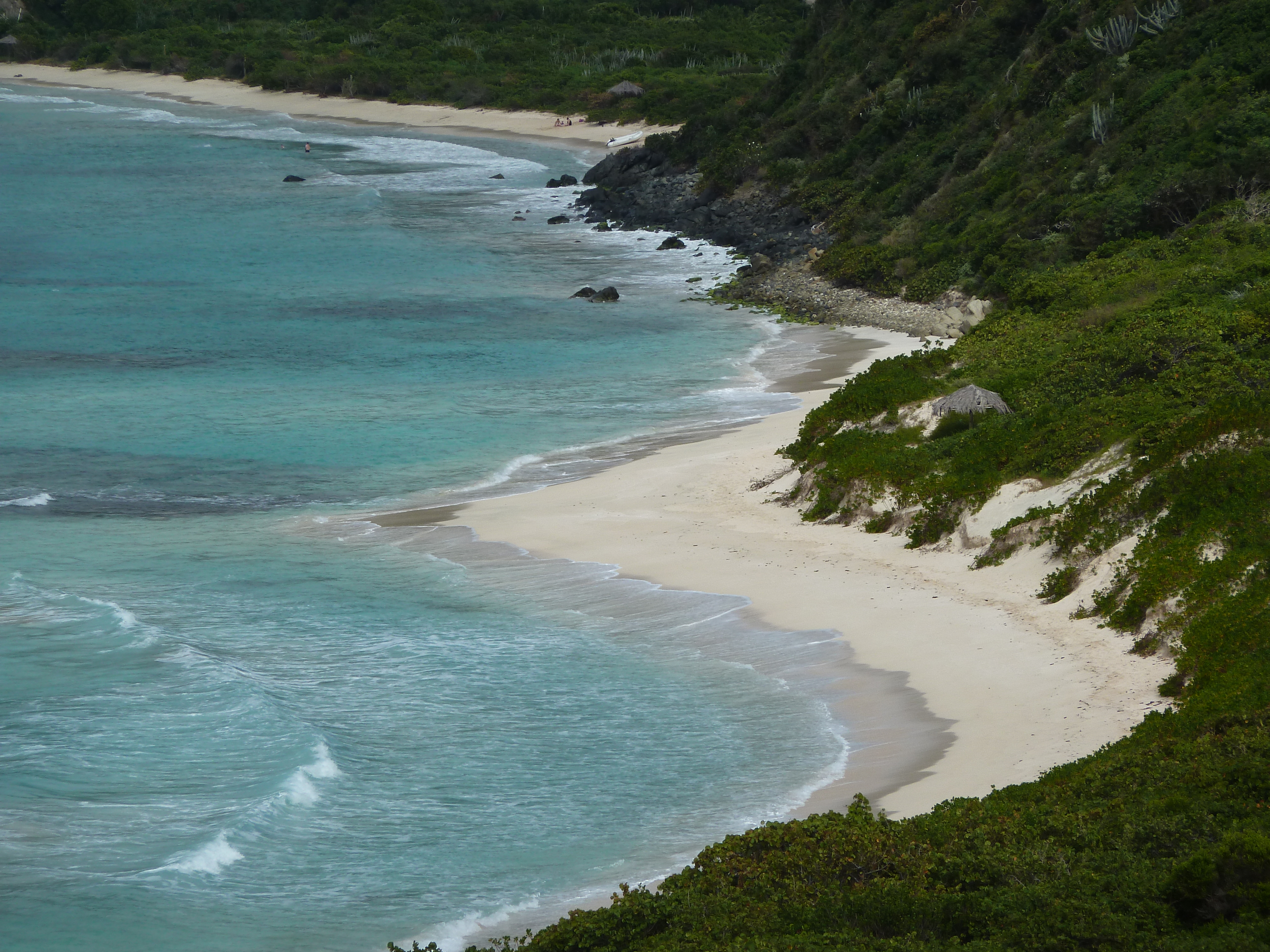
Savannah Bay overlook, Virgin Gorda, British Virgin Islands

Geologically, the Lesser Antilles island arc stretches from Grenada in the south to Anguilla in the north. The Virgin Islands and Sombrero Island are geologically part of the Greater Antilles, while Trinidad is part of South America and Tobago is the remainder of a separate island arc. The Leeward Antilles are also a separate island arc, which is accreting to South America.

== Political divisions ==
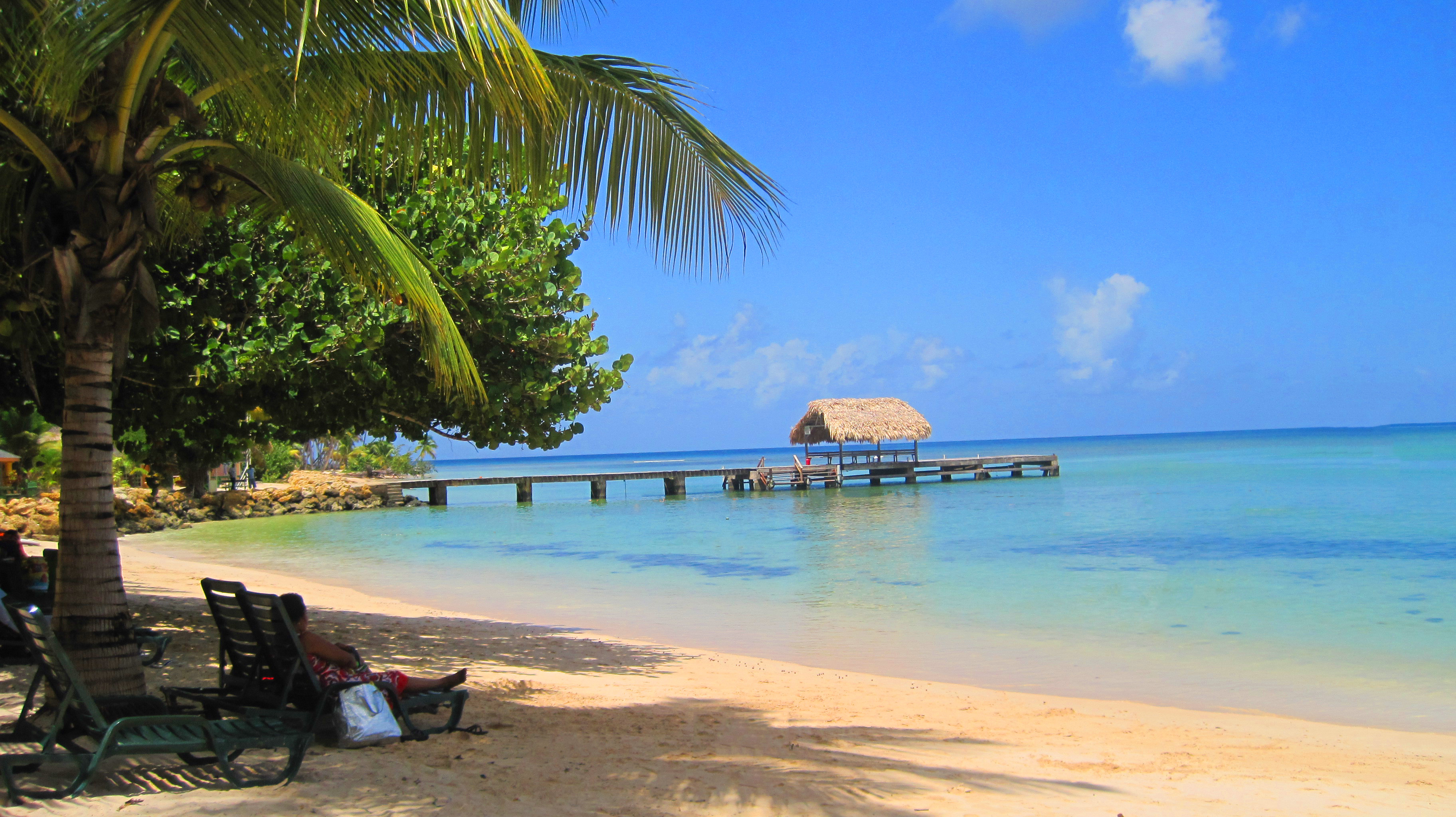
Pigeon Point, Trinidad and Tobago

The Lesser Antilles are divided into eight independent nations and numerous dependent and non-sovereign states (which are politically associated with France, the Netherlands, the United Kingdom, the United States, or Venezuela). Over one third of the total area and population of the Lesser Antilles lies within Trinidad and Tobago, a sovereign nation comprising the two southernmost islands of the Windward Island chain.

=== Sovereign states ===
| Name | Subdivisions | Area | | Population (July 1, 2005, est.) | Population density | | Capital |
| Name | Subdivisions | km^{2} | sq mi | Population (July 1, 2005, est.) | per km^{2} | per sq mi | Capital |
|---|---|---|---|---|---|---|---|
| Antigua and Barbuda | Parishes on Antigua | 440 | 170 | 85,632 | 195 | 510 | St. John's |
| Antigua and Barbuda | Barbuda | 161 | 62 | 1,370 | 9.65 | 25.0 | Codrington |
| Antigua and Barbuda | Redonda | 2 | 0.77 | 0 | 0 | 0 | —N/a |
| Barbados | Parishes | 431 | 166 | 284,589 | 660 | 1,700 | Bridgetown |
| Dominica | Parishes | 754 | 291 | 72,660 | 96.3 | 249 | Roseau |
| Grenada | Parishes | 344 | 133 | 110,000 | 319.8 | 828 | St. George's |
| Saint Kitts and Nevis | Parishes | 261 | 101 | 42,696 | 163.5 | 423 | Basseterre |
| Saint Kitts and Nevis | Nevis | 93 | 36 | 12,106 | 130.1 | 337 | Charlestown |
| Saint Lucia | Districts | 616 | 238 | 173,765 | 282 | 730 | Castries |
| Saint Vincent and the Grenadines | Parishes | 389 | 150 | 110,000 | 283 | 730 | Kingstown |
| Trinidad and Tobago | Regions and municipalities of Trinidad | 5,131 | 1,981 | 1,405,953 | 253.3 | 656 | Port of Spain |
| Trinidad and Tobago | Tobago | 300 | 120 | 60,000 | 180 | 470 | Scarborough |
| Total | | 8,367 | 3,231 | 2,179,295 | 260.5 | 675 | |

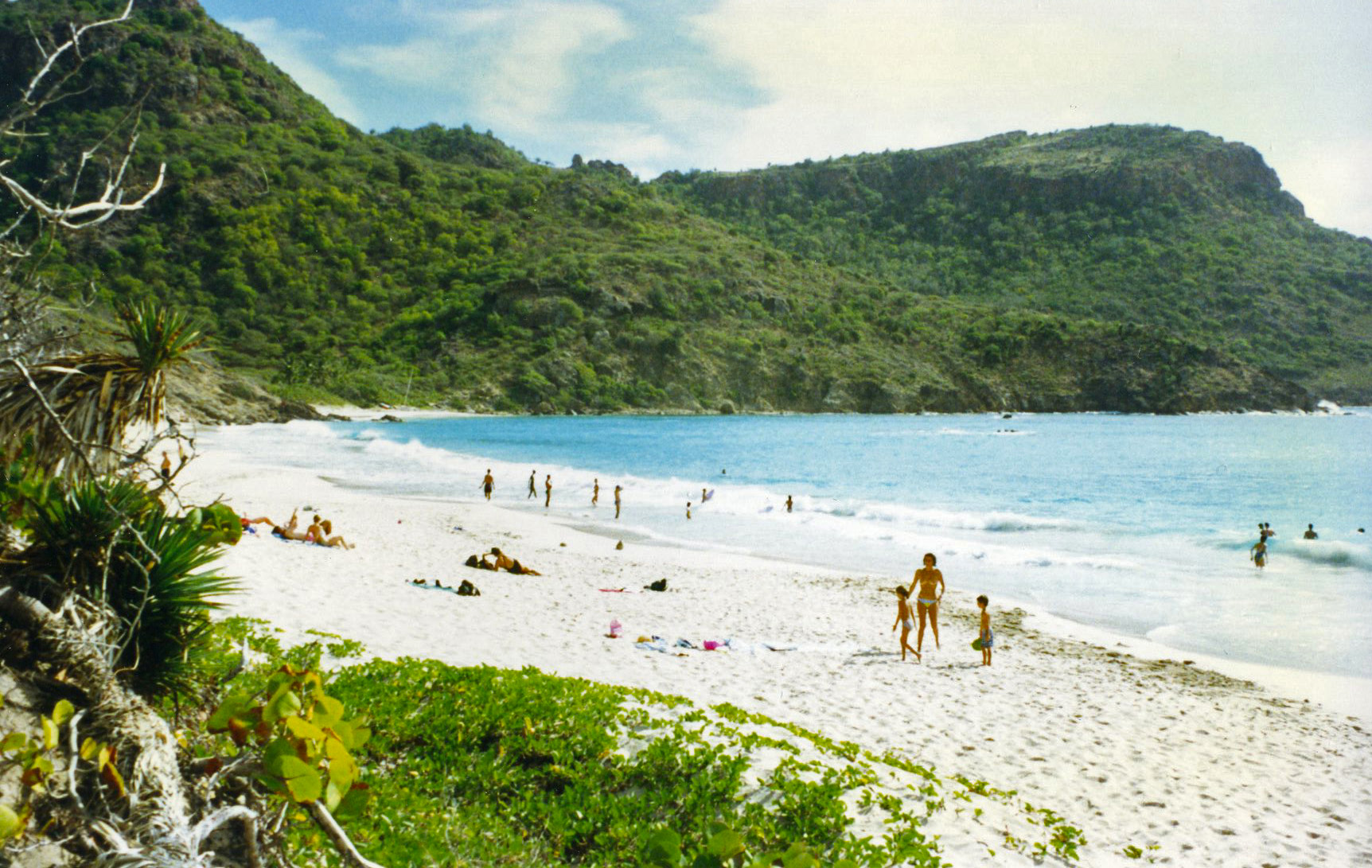
Beach at the Anse de Grande Saline on Saint Barthélemy, French Antilles

=== Non-sovereign states and territories ===
| Name | Sovereign state | Subdivisions | Area | | Population (July 1, 2005, est.) | Population density | | Capital |
| Name | Sovereign state | Subdivisions | km^{2} | sq mi | Population (July 1, 2005, est.) | per km^{2} | per sq mi | Capital |
|---|---|---|---|---|---|---|---|---|
| Aruba | Kingdom of the Netherlands | Districts | 193 | 75 | 103,065 | 534.0 | 1,383 | Oranjestad |
| Anguilla | UK | Districts | 91 | 35 | 13,600 | 149.4 | 387 | The Valley |
| Bonaire | Netherlands | | 288 | 111 | 14,006 | 48.6 | 126 | Kralendijk |
| British Virgin Islands | UK | Districts | 153 | 59 | 27,000 | 176.5 | 457 | Road Town |
| Curaçao | Kingdom of the Netherlands | Districts | 444 | 171 | 180,592 | 406.7 | 1,053 | Willemstad |
| Guadeloupe | France | Arrondissements | 1,780 | 690 | 440,000 | 247.2 | 640 | Basse-Terre |
| Martinique | France | Arrondissements | 1,128 | 436 | 400,000 | 354.6 | 918 | Fort-de-France |
| Montserrat | UK | Parishes | 120 | 46 | 4,655 | 38.8 | 100 | Brades |
| Saba | Netherlands | | 13 | 5.0 | 1,424 | 109.5 | 284 | The Bottom |
| Saint Barthélemy | France | Paroisses (parishes) | 21 | 8.1 | 7,448 | 354.6 | 918 | Gustavia |
| Saint-Martin | France | | 53 | 20 | 35,000 | 660.4 | 1,710 | Marigot |
| Sint Eustatius | Netherlands | | 34 | 13 | 3,100 | 91.2 | 236 | Oranjestad |
| Sint Maarten | Kingdom of the Netherlands | | 34 | 13 | 40,917 | 1,203.4 | 3,117 | Philipsburg |
| Spanish Virgin Islands (Puerto Rico) | United States | Barrios | 165.1 | 63.7 | 11,119 | 67.35 | 174.4 | Culebra; Isabel II |
| United States Virgin Islands | United States | Districts | 346 | 134 | 108,448 | 313.4 | 812 | Charlotte Amalie |
| Nueva Esparta | Venezuela | Municipalities | 1,150 | 440 | 491,610 | 427.5 | 1,107 | La Asunción |
| Federal Dependencies of Venezuela | Venezuela | Federal dependencies | 342 | 132 | 2,155 | 6.3 | 16 | Gran Roque |
| Total | | | 5,997 | 2,315 | 1,769,955 | 20.1 | 52 | |

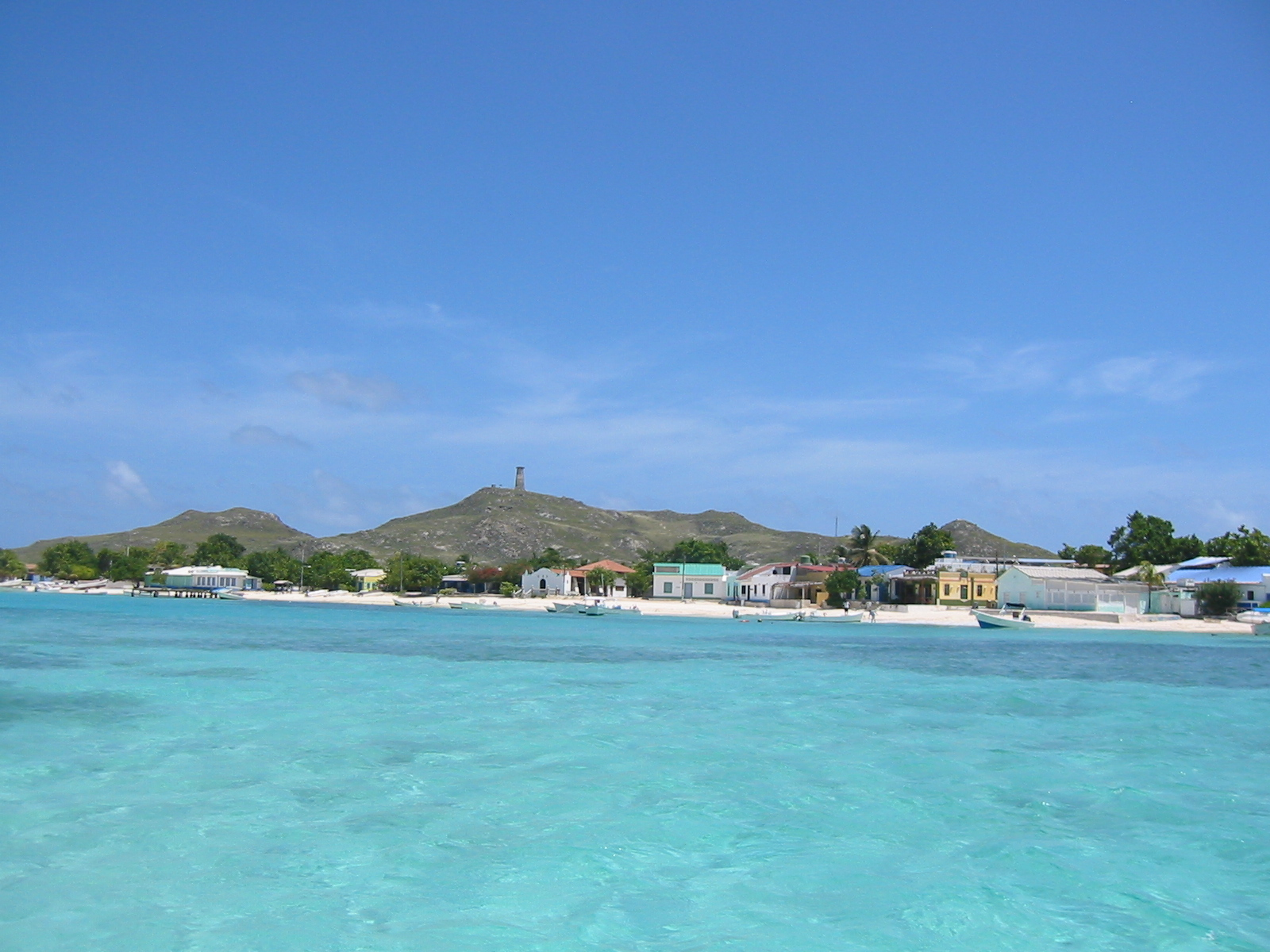
Los Roques archipelago, Federal Dependencies of Venezuela in the Leeward Antilles

Several islands off the north coast of Venezuela and politically part of that country are also considered part of the Lesser Antilles. These are listed in the section below.

== Islands ==
The main Lesser Antilles are (from north to south to west):

=== Leeward Islands ===
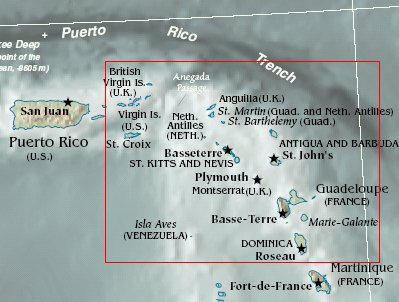
The Leeward Islands

- Anguilla (UK)
- Saint Martin (France) / Sint Maarten (Netherlands)
- Saint Barthélemy (France)
- Saba (Netherlands)
- Sint Eustatius (Netherlands)
- Saint Kitts (St. Kitts and Nevis)
- Nevis (St. Kitts and Nevis)
- Barbuda (Antigua and Barbuda)
- Antigua (Antigua and Barbuda)
  - Redonda (Antigua and Barbuda) uninhabited
- Montserrat (UK)
- Basse-Terre and Grande-Terre (often combined as Guadeloupe) (France)
  - La Désirade (Guadeloupe dependency) (France)
  - Marie-Galante (Guadeloupe dependency) (France)
  - Îles des Saintes archipelago (Guadeloupe dependency) (France)

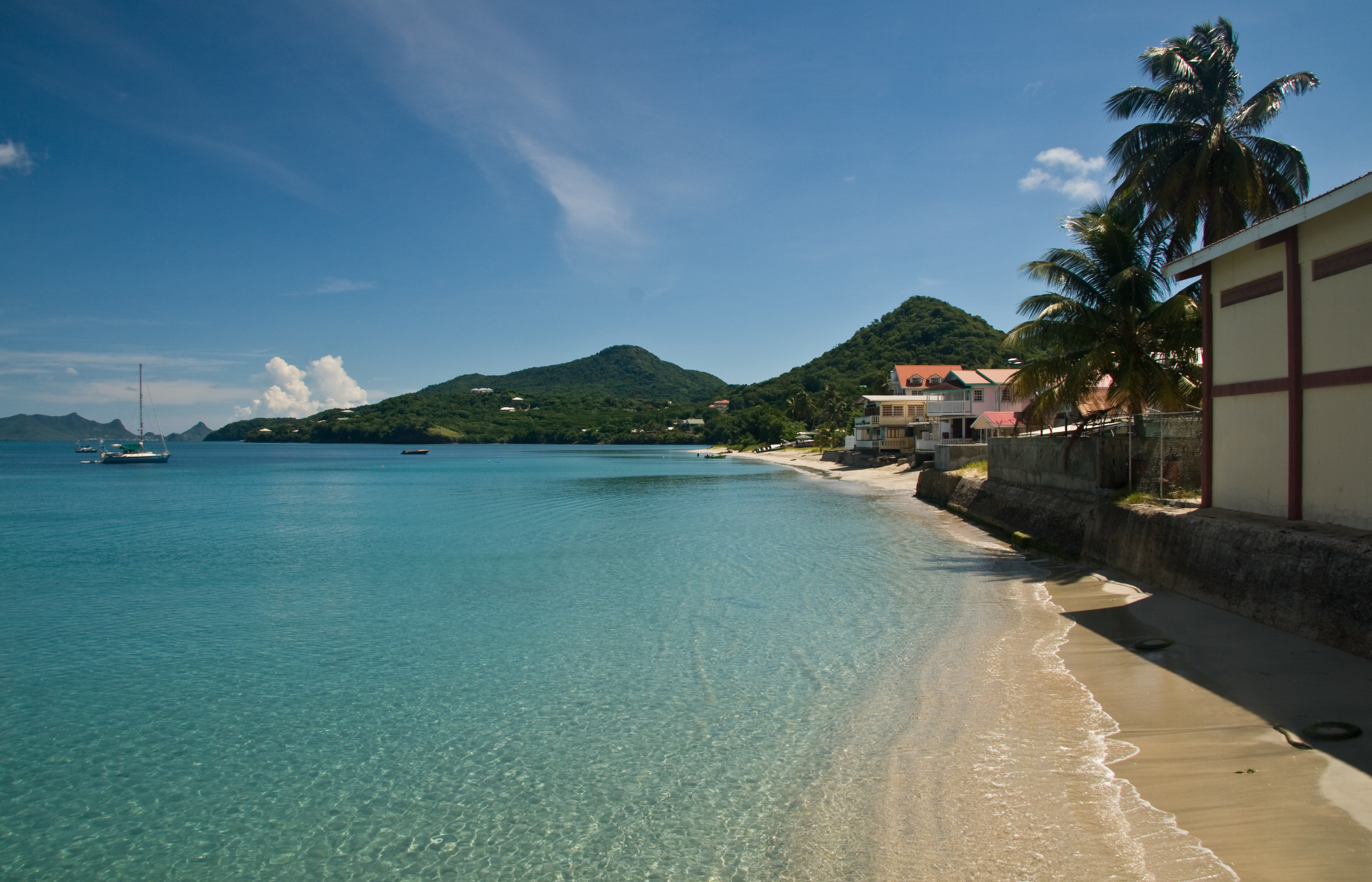
Carriacou, Grenada

=== Windward Islands ===
- Dominica (Dominica)
- Martinique (France)
- Saint Lucia (St. Lucia)
- Saint Vincent (St. Vincent and the Grenadines)
- Grenadines (St. Vincent and the Grenadines)
- Carriacou and Petite Martinique (Grenada)
- Grenada (Grenada)

=== Leeward Antilles ===
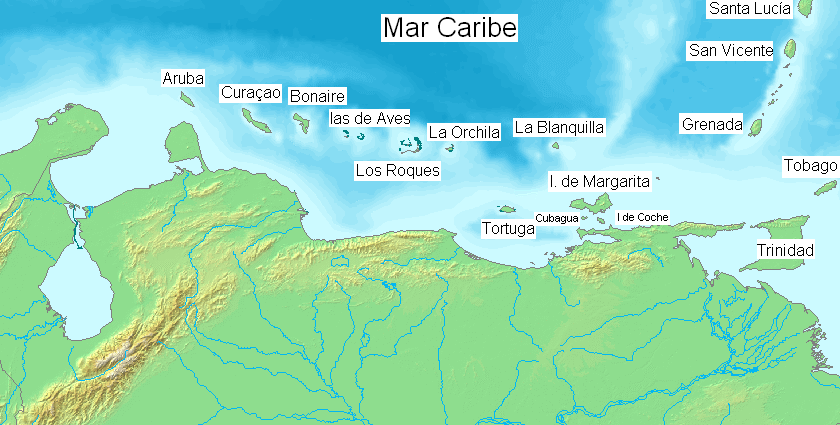
A map of the Leeward Antilles

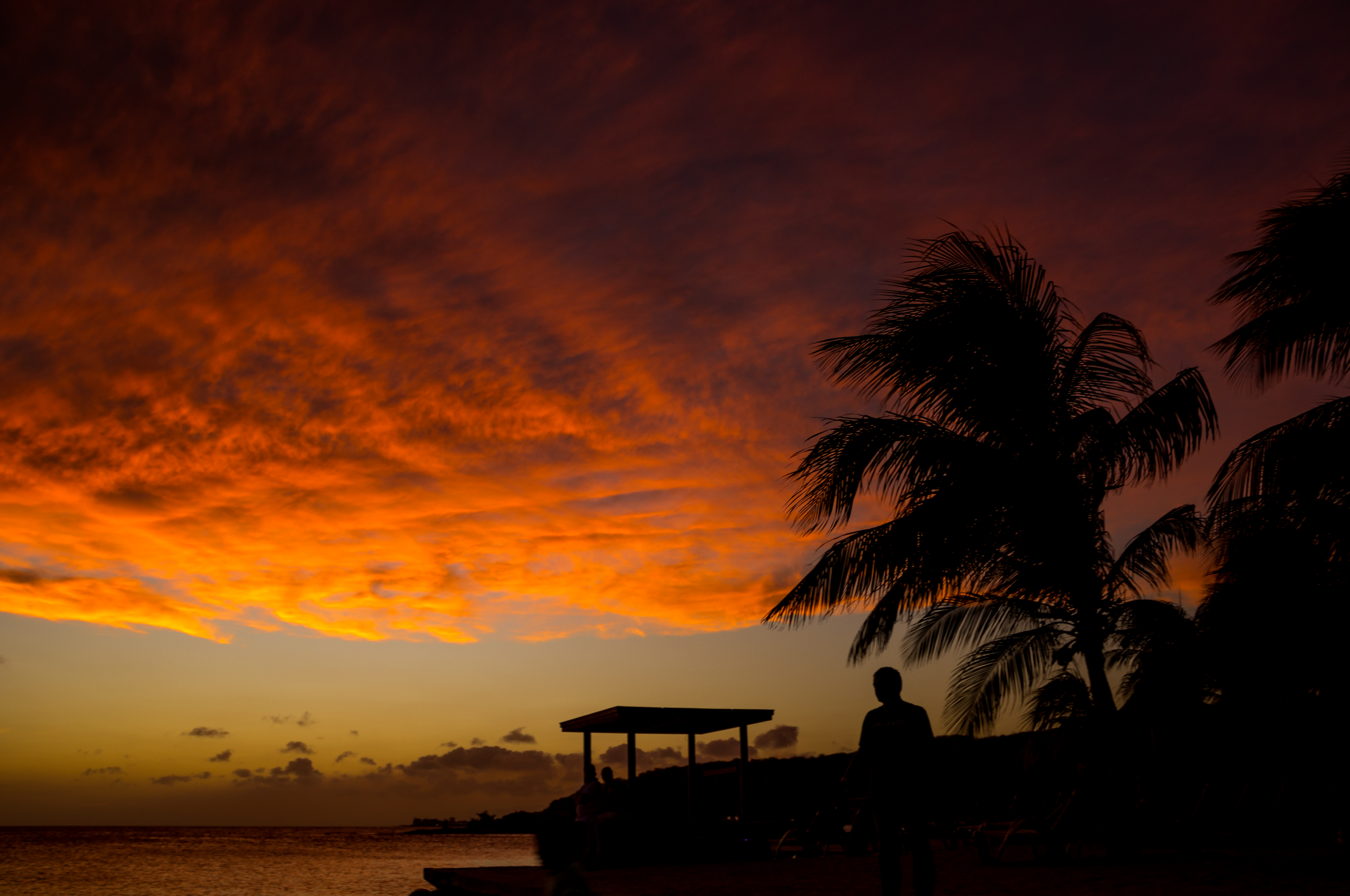
Curaçao, part of the Kingdom of the Netherlands

Islands north of the Venezuelan coast (from west to east):

- Aruba (Netherlands)
- Curaçao (Netherlands)
- Bonaire (Netherlands)
- Federal Dependencies of Venezuela (Venezuela)
  - Los Monjes Archipelago
  - La Tortuga Island
  - La Sola Island
  - Los Testigos Islands
  - Los Frailes Islands
  - Patos Island
  - Los Roques Archipelago
  - La Blanquilla Island
  - Los Hermanos Archipelago
  - La Orchila Island
  - Las Aves Archipelago
  - Aves Island
- Nueva Esparta (Venezuela)
  - Margarita Island
  - Coche
  - Cubagua

=== Isolated islands in the Lesser Antilles ===
- Barbados^{†} (Note: Barbados is a continental island found 100 miles (160 km) east of the Windward chain.)
- Trinidad and Tobago^{†} (Note: Sometimes considered part of the Windward Islands. They are the most southern islands of the Caribbean region. See Islands of Trinidad and Tobago.)

^{†} Physiographically, these are continental islands not part of the volcanic Windward Islands arc. However, based on proximity, these islands are sometimes grouped with the Windward Islands culturally and politically.

== See also ==
- Lesser Antilles Volcanic Arc
- Organisation of Eastern Caribbean States
- Southern Caribbean

== Bibliography ==
- Rogonzinski, Jan. A Brief History of the Caribbean. New York: Facts on File. 1992. ISBN 978-0816024513.
- Keegan, William F. & Hofman, Corinne L. The Caribbean before Columbus. New York: Oxford University Press. 2017. ISBN 978-0190605278
