= Bellamy Cay =

Island in the British Virgin Islands, Caribbean

- Location within British Virgin Islands Location within the Caribbean

Geography
- Location: Caribbean Sea
- Coordinates: 18°26′54″N 64°31′58″W
- Archipelago: Virgin Islands

Administration
- United Kingdom; British Virgin Islands
- British Overseas Territory: British Virgin Islands

Additional information
- Time zone: AST (UTC-4)
- ISO code: VG
- Bellamy Cay Lighthouse
- Construction: metal mast
- Shape: mast with light
- Characteristic: F W

Bellamy Cay is an island in the British Virgin Islands, located entirely within Trellis Bay on Beef Island. Formerly called Blanco Islet, this island is named after its most famous resident, Samuel Bellamy.

== History ==
For much of his very short but wildly successful campaign of piracy in 1716 and 1717, Bellamy used this islet, which was named Blanco Islet at the time, as his base of operations, while crew members used the protection of Trellis Bay to maintain their fleet of ships. Bellamy soon learned that from Blanco, as well as from nearby Sprat Point, ships could be seen sailing through the Sir Francis Drake Channel. His favourite prey were Spanish Galleons laden with treasure intended for the exclusive use of the King and Queen of Spain.

In the early 1950s the small island was acquired by Władysław (Wladek) Wagner, the "first Polish yachtsman", who left Poland in 1932 to sail around the world and who ended up eventually settling in Trellis Bay, Beef Island Tortola in the British Virgin Islands. Wagner built a boatyard and marine railway in addition to most of the buildings now standing on Bellamy Cay, where he ran a small restaurant and hotel. Wagner´s voyage is described in the book By the Sun and Stars.

Since the 1970s, the cay has been the home of the restaurant and bar called "The Last Resort", which for many years was owned and operated by Tony Snell, a British war hero. Bellamy Cay is near the Terrance B. Lettsome International Airport, and is inhabited by the owners and staff of the restaurant. The island remains off the power, water and communications grid of the mainland, producing its own electricity and water through solar, wind and Diesel generators.

In 2017, Hurricane Irma badly damaged much of the buildings and other developments on Bellamy Cay, making it unusable at this time. The whole island is effectively a site of ruins now, complete with a washed up fishing vessel on its shores.

== See also ==
- Samuel Bellamy
- Whydah Gally
- Piracy in the British Virgin Islands
- List of lighthouses in the British Virgin Islands
