= Norman Island =

Island in the British Virgin Islands

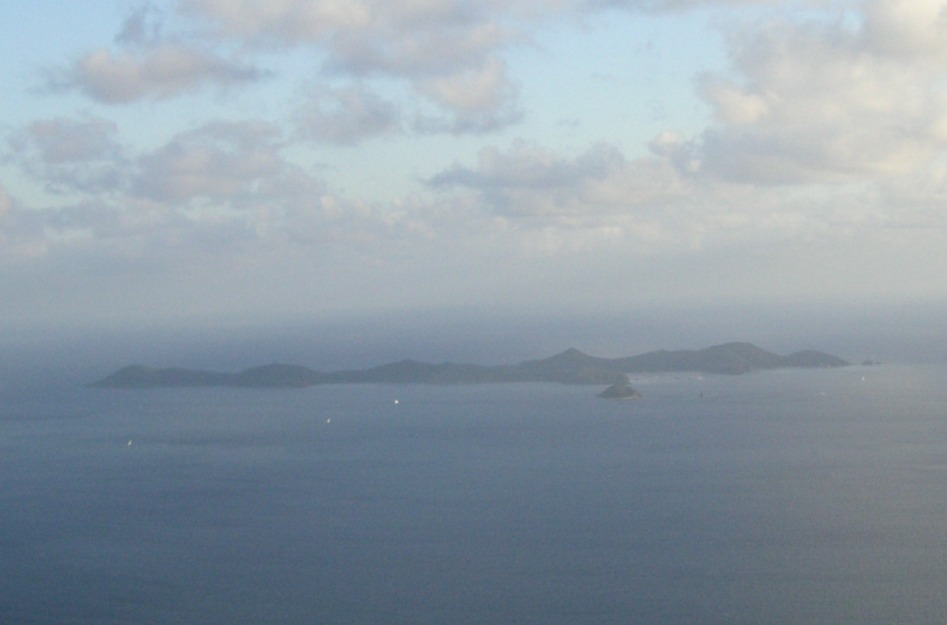
- View of Norman Island from Sage Mountain on Tortola

- The location of Norman Island within the British Virgin Islands

- Location within British Virgin Islands Location within the Caribbean

Geography
- Location: Caribbean Sea
- Coordinates: 18°19′N 64°37′W
- Archipelago: Virgin Islands, Leeward Islands

Administration
- United Kingdom
- British Overseas Territory: British Virgin Islands

Additional information
- Time zone: AST (UTC-4)
- ISO code: VG

Norman Island is an island at the southern tip of the British Virgin Islands archipelago. It is one of a number of islands reputed to be the inspiration for Robert Louis Stevenson's pirate novel Treasure Island.

== History ==
Norman Island was named after a pirate who bought it or leased it at some point during the early 18th century.

However, Norman Island also has a documented history of pirate booty being stowed upon the island. In August 1750, a Spanish treasure galleon named Nuestra Señora de Guadalupe sought shelter from a storm on the North Carolina coast. The crew mutinied and the treasure, said to consist of (amongst other things) 55 chests of silver coins, was loaded into two bilanders, one of which was carrying Owen Lloyd. The first vessel was lost, but Lloyd escaped to St. Croix. After disposing of some of the money, he proceeded to Norman Island where the treasure was buried. Lloyd and his crew were later arrested in St. Eustatius, but word of the treasure spread, and residents of Tortola went to Norman Island and dug it up for themselves. Part of the booty was later recovered by Gilbert Fleming, Lieutenant-General of the Leeward Islands at the time, who travelled to Tortola with two companies of soldiers. Fleming persuaded Abraham Chalwill, the acting Lieutenant Governor of the British Virgin Islands (who had coincidentally led the search for the treasure on Norman Island) to issue a proclamation whereby the treasure would be returned and the people who had dug it up would receive a one-third share as a reward.

There the historical record ends, but local rumours abound that a member of a well-known local family had been fishing near Norman Island and took shelter in one of the caves on the Western coast of Norman Island during a storm. The surge repeatedly banged his small boat against the walls of the cave, whilst the storm surge caused the water level to rise several feet. When the fortunate fisherman woke the next morning, a large number of rocks had broken off into his small craft, as had a small chest, supposedly filled with gold doubloons. The story cannot be verified as no legal application for treasure trove was ever made, but it is known that members of the family ceased being fisherman and left Tortola at about the time to open some shops in Charlotte Amalie in St. Thomas.

Rumours persist of more pirate gold to be found on Norman Island, although to date no applications have ever been made for treasure trove.

== Today ==
The island is uninhabited and privately owned by Henry Jarecki. Its area is about 600 acres (242.8 ha), and it is about 2.5 miles (4.0 km) long. A large harbour known as the Bight offers one of the most protected anchorages in the area. It is one of the "Little Sisters", along with Pelican Island, Peter Island, Salt Island, Dead Chest Island, and Ginger Island. This group of islands is smaller, lower, and more arid than other islands to the north and west.

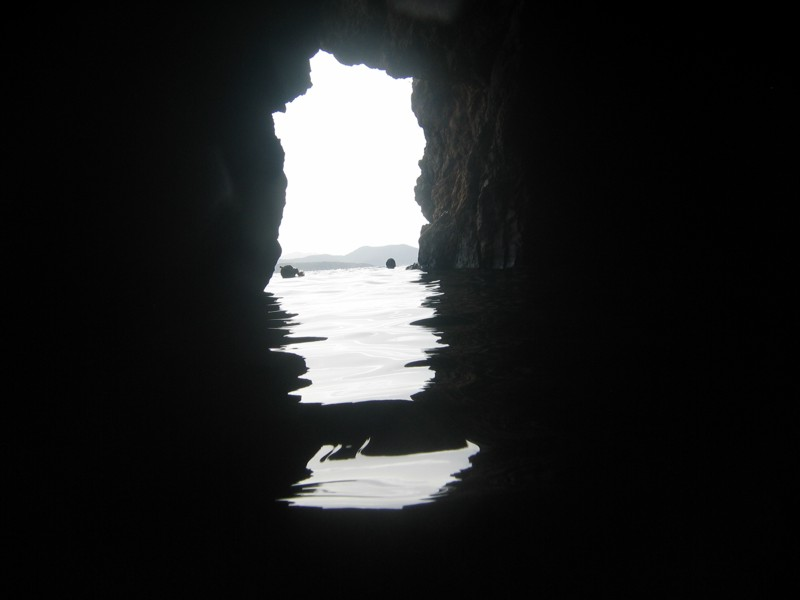
Snorkelling inside a cave at Norman Island, the island of Tortola is visible in the background

Norman Island is a well-known destination for cruisers and other tourists because of three water-level caves at the base of cliffs just outside the western edge of the Bight. The caves are ideal for snorkelling, and, if one goes deeply enough into the cliffs, darkness makes the experience like a night dive.

The island has no permanent inhabitants (other than wild goats), but there are two restaurants on the island, Pirates Bight and The Club. Previously anchored in the Bight was a modern copy of an old schooner named the Willy T, which operated as a bar and restaurant. In September 2017, the Willy T was destroyed by Hurricane Irma. The owners of the Willy T had a new ship built and in May 2018 it was announced that the BVI government would not let the Willy T anchor on Norman Island. The owner, Ewan Anderson, threatened legal action. The BVI reversed course in 2019. The Willy T is currently anchored in Bight Bay, approximately 500 feet offshore from Norman Island.

=== Cultural legacy ===
Some think that Norman Island and the tales about its treasures have inspired Robert Louis Stevenson to write Treasure Island. The estimated timeframe of Treasure Island approximates to the time of the salvaging of the booty of the Nuestra Señora de Guadalupe on Norman Island.

Norman Island has so many caves, hidden bays, and wrecks that many tourists still explore hoping to find treasure one day, and tourism operators in the British Virgin Islands have no interest in trying to discourage this.

=== Economic development ===
==== Joint Venture Agreement with Henry Jarecki ====
On 22 November 2018, the BVI government, headed by Orlando Smith, entered into a Development Agreement with Audubon Holdings, owned by Henry Jarecki, to develop Norman Island as an environmentally conscious, luxury residential and tourist destination.

Together with the island's owner, the BVI government expects to establish a model for environmentally sustainable development. After planning and environmental approvals have met, the government hopes that the first phase of the project starts in the course of 2019.
