= Carvel Rock =

Carvel Rock may refer to:

- Carvel Rock (British Virgin Islands), near Cooper Island
- Carvel Rock (United States Virgin Islands), immediately east of Lovango Cay and Congo Cay
