= By the Sun and Stars =

Sailing book

By the Sun and Stars is an editorial documentation of an epic journey around the globe by sailboat. It was written via a logbook by Capt. Wladek Wagner while he traversed the vast oceans of the world. The journey took six years, from 1932 to 1939. After his voyage, Mr. Wagner settled on Bellamy Cay. The book was published in 1986 by Cody Publications, Inc. (Kissimmee, Florida).
