= List of lighthouses in the British Virgin Islands =

This is a list of lighthouses in the British Virgin Islands.

== Light beacons ==
| Name | Image | Year built | Coordinates | Class of Light | Focal height | NGA number | Admiralty number | Range nml |
|---|---|---|---|---|---|---|---|---|
| Anegada West End Light beacon | | N/A | Anegada; 18°44′28.6″N 64°24′57.1″W | Fl W 10s. | 6 metres (20 ft) | 14702 | J5632.5 | 10 |
| Bellamy Cay Light beacon | | N/A | Bellamy Cay; 18°26′53.4″N 64°31′57.5″W | F W | N/A | 14699 | J5636.5 | N/A |
| Ginger Island Light beacon | | N/A | Ginger Island; 18°23′34.1″N 64°28′14.7″W | Fl W 5s. | 4 metres (13 ft) | 14704 | J5637 | 14 |
| Pajaros Point Light beacon | | N/A | Virgin Gorda; 18°30′13.1″N 64°19′17.7″W | Fl (3) W 15s. | N/A | 14700 | J5637 | 16 |
| Roadtown Range Front Light beacon | | 1900s. est. | Road Town; 18°25′07.6″N 64°37′04.5″W | F R | 2 metres (6.6 ft) | 14696 | J5635 | 3 |
| Salt Island Light beacon | | N/A | Salt Island; 18°22′18.4″N 64°32′03.4″W | Fl W 10s. | N/A | 14708 | J5636 | 14 |

== See also ==
- Lists of lighthouses and lightvessels
