= Pelican Island (British Virgin Islands) =

Island in the British Virgin Islands

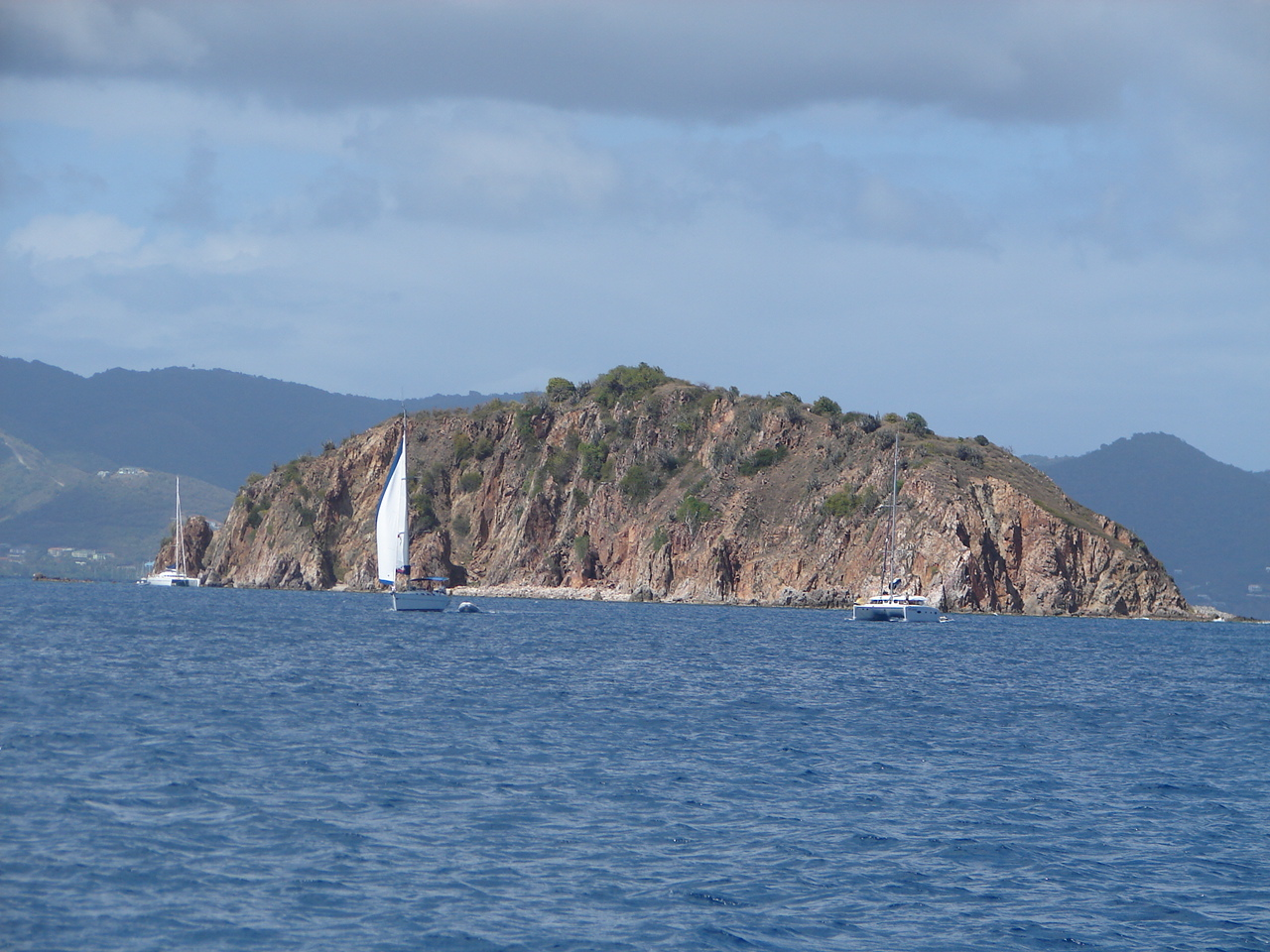
- Pelican Island

- The location of Pelican Island within the British Virgin Islands

- Location within British Virgin Islands Location within the Caribbean

Geography
- Location: Caribbean Sea
- Coordinates: 18.3326°N 64.6253°W
- Archipelago: Virgin Islands

Administration
- United Kingdom
- British Overseas Territory: British Virgin Islands

Demographics
- Population: 0

Additional information
- Time zone: AST (UTC-4)
- ISO code: VG

Pelican Island is an uninhabited island in the southwestern corner of the British Virgin Islands in the Caribbean. It is located immediately north of Norman Island. It is east of Flanagan Island in the southeastern corner of the US Virgin Islands.

The rocky cliffs on the south-western face of the island plunge into the sea, The National Park moorings make it a popular snorkeling and dive site. It is perfectly possible to land a boat on the other side of the island, although there is not much to see.

In some older charts, Pelican Island is referred to as Witch Island, as is Flanagan Island. This confusion may be connected to a pre-1977 lack of clarification as to whether Flanagan formed part of the Danish (now US) islands, or the British Virgin Islands.
