= Carvel Rock (British Virgin Islands) =

Islet of the British Virgin Islands

Carvel Rock Carval Rock
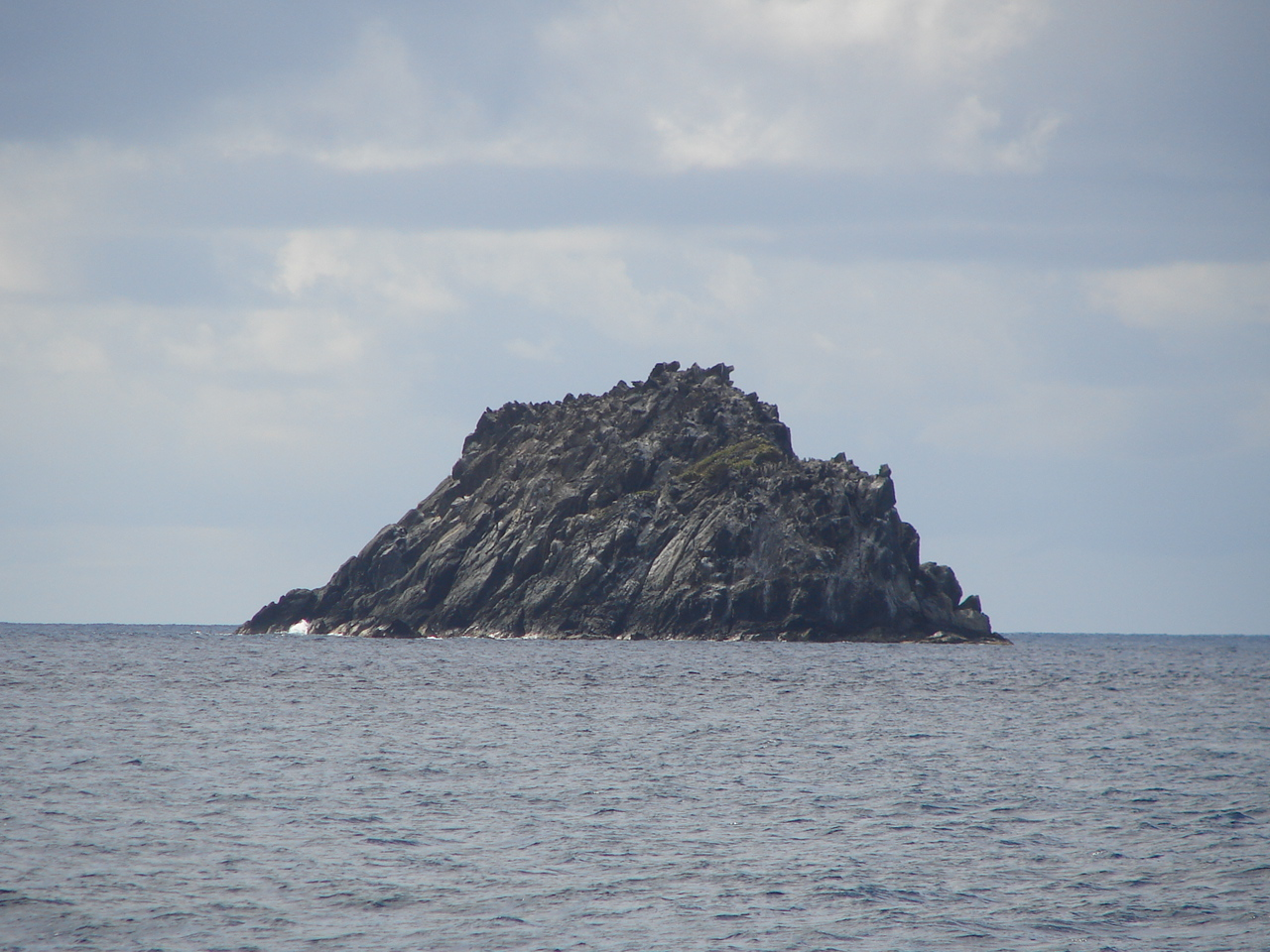
- Carvel Rock

- Location within British Virgin Islands Location within the Caribbean

Geography
- Location: Caribbean Sea
- Coordinates: 18.372929°N 64.488524°W
- Archipelago: Virgin Islands

Administration
- United Kingdom; British Virgin Islands
- British Overseas Territory: British Virgin Islands

Demographics
- Population: 0

Additional information
- Time zone: AST (UTC-4)
- ISO code: VG

Carvel Rock (sometimes spelled Carval Rock) is an uninhabited islet of the British Virgin Islands in the Caribbean, less than 2 acres (8,100 m^{2}) in size. It lies at the southern edge of the archipelago, south of and roughly between Ginger Island and Cooper Island.

The waters around it are a scuba diving site, but its sheer cliffs and lack of a beach make landing practically impossible.

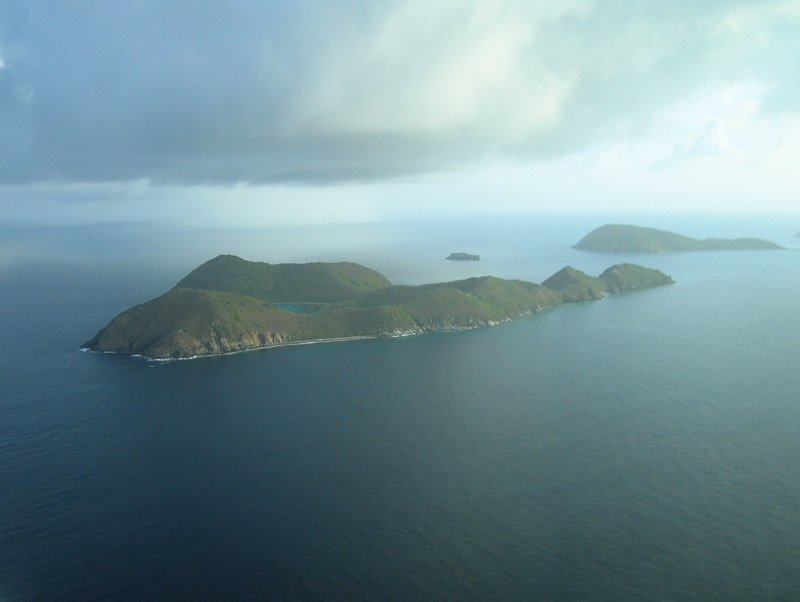
An aerial view showing Carvel Rock between Ginger Island and Cooper Island

== Flora and fauna ==
Sponge-covered boulders and fire coral create habitat for variety of fish — green morays, French grunts, blue tang, whitespotted filefish to name a few. Divers reported observing sharks, barracuda, moray eels, lobsters, red lip blennies, amberjacks, groupers, queen triggerfish and black triggerfish, jewelfish, gobies, damselfish, mackerels, kingfish, trumpetfish, spotted drums and high-hat triplefins.
