= The Settlement, British Virgin Islands =

The Settlement
- Town
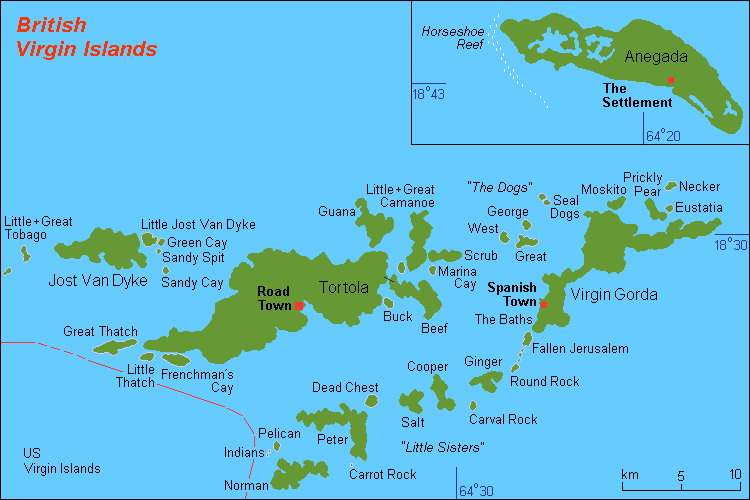
- British Virgin Islands, The Settlement top right
- Interactive map of The Settlement
- Coordinates: 18°43′7″N 64°19′1″W
- Country: United Kingdom
- British Overseas Territory: British Virgin Islands
- Island: Anegada

Population
  - Estimate: 300
- Time zone: UTC-04:00 (AST)

The Settlement is the main and only town on Anegada in the British Virgin Islands in the Caribbean.

== The town ==
The Settlement lies near Lower Bay at the southeastern part of the island and has about 200 inhabitants. The coordinates are 18°43′07″N 64°19′01″W.

The center of this very small town, often also called "the Village," consists of the area along the main road.

Besides the Government Administration Building, a small medical clinic, a post office, a police building and a library there also are a few restaurants, hotels, and a few small stores.

On the outskirts can be found the Walls, a farming area circled by old stone walls. The enclosed fields were used to grow bananas, maize, sweet potatoes and other crops.

There is also the Iguana Headstart Facility, a breeding farm for iguanas, mainly the Anegada Ground Iguana (or Anegada rock iguana, "Cyclura pinguis"). The farm is managed by the BVI National Parks Trust and the iguanas are released when they are large enough to survive in the wild.

The town's harbor is at Setting Point which is a popular place for sailboats. The harbour has connections with Road Town on Tortola thrice-weekly by ferry.

The town's and the island's airport, the small Auguste George Airport (airport code "NGD"), is about 1 mile northwest of the town.

== History ==
In 1672, Anegada was made part of the British colony Antigua and has been under British control ever since.

San Diego Zoo Global has been running the Anegada Iguana Project since 1992, with the Iguana Headstart Facility being opened in 2003.

Today, tourism is the main income source for the town even though commercial fishing also is a substantial business.
