= Sir Francis Drake Channel =

Strait in the British Virgin Islands

Coordinates: 18.39°N 64.56°W

Location of the Sir Francis Drake Channel

The Sir Francis Drake Channel is a strait in the British Virgin Islands, separating the main island of Tortola from several smaller islands to the south. The channel is named after famed English privateer Sir Francis Drake.
