= Anegada =

Northernmost of the British Virgin Islands

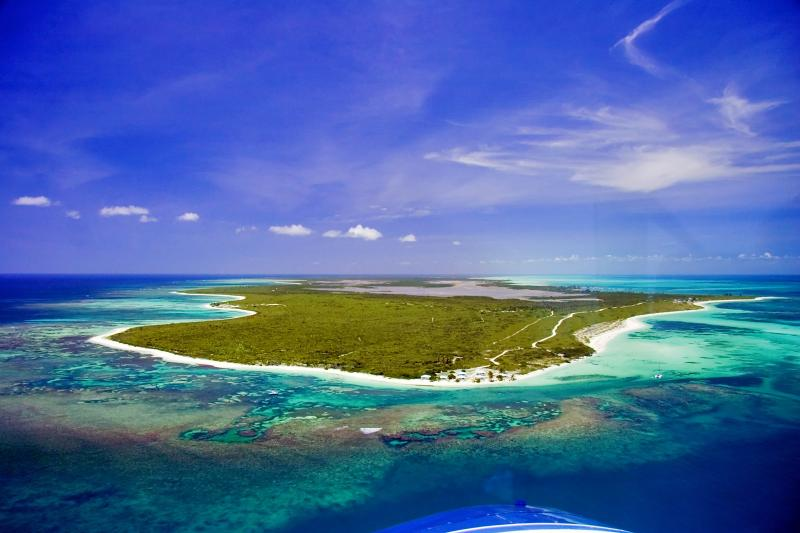
- Unlike the other British Virgin Islands, Anegada is a low-lying coral island rather than a volcanic island.

- The location of Anegada within the British Virgin Islands

- Location within British Virgin Islands Location within the Caribbean

Geography
- Location: Atlantic Ocean
- Coordinates: 18°44′N 64°20′W
- Archipelago: Virgin Islands
- Area: 14 sq mi (36 km^{2})

Administration
- United Kingdom; British Virgin Islands
- British Overseas Territory: British Virgin Islands

Demographics
- Population: 450 (2024)

Additional information
- Time zone: AST (UTC-4)
- ISO code: VG
- Anegada Lighthouse
- Power source: solar power
- Focal height: 19 m (62 ft)
- Range: 10 nmi (19 km; 12 mi)
- Characteristic: Fl W 10s

Anegada /ˌænəˈɡɑːdə/ is the northernmost of the British Virgin Islands (BVI), a group of islands that form part of the archipelago of the Virgin Islands. It lies about 15 miles (24 km) north of Virgin Gorda. Anegada is the only inhabited British Virgin Island formed from coral and limestone, rather than of volcanic origin. While the other islands are mountainous, Anegada is flat and low. Its highest point is only about 28 feet (8.5 m) above sea level, earning it its name, which is from the Spanish for "flooded land", tierra anegada.

Additionally, Anegada is the only sliver of land directly south of Bermuda, another British overseas territory. Anegada lies directly west of Mauritania in Africa and east of all other islands in the British Virgin Islands.

At about 15 square miles (38 square kilometers), Anegada is the second-largest of the British Virgin Islands. With a population of 450 as of the 2024 census, most of Anegada's residents live in the only village, The Settlement.

== Economy ==
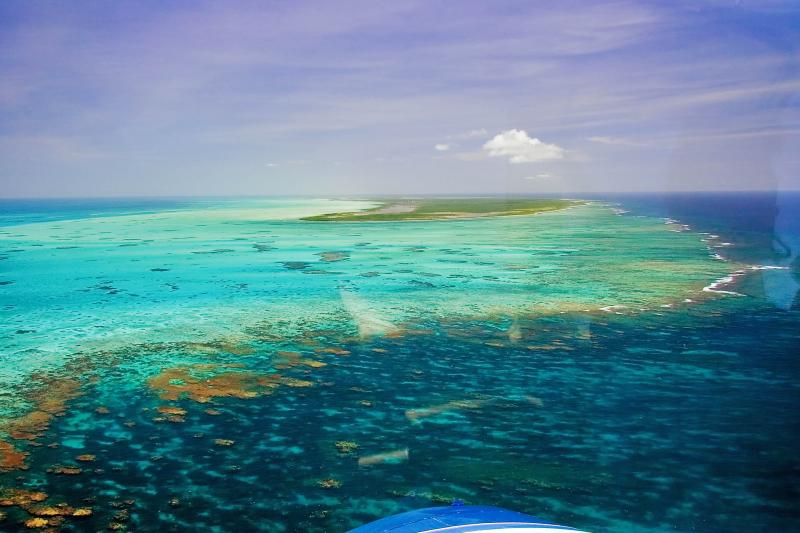
Horseshoe Reef extends southeastward from Anegada

The primary business of Anegada is tourism. On a typical day during the tourist season, the island has 200 to 300 visitors. Commercial fishing is also a substantial business on Anegada, with local fishermen providing most of the fresh fish and lobster catch for the rest of the British Virgin Islands. Its miles of south shore flats have a large population of bonefish, making Anegada a popular destination for fly fishing.

From 2008 to 2013 Anegada was home to one of the tallest Christmas trees in the Caribbean and had an official tree lighting ceremony and party each year. The tree, donated by Adrian Johnson, was intended to help bring visitors to the island and provided a flotilla destination for many sailors.

== Access ==
Access to the island is via the small Auguste George Airport (NGD), thrice-weekly ferries, and private boat. Charter flights run directly to Anegada from Tortola, Virgin Gorda, San Juan, St. Thomas, Antigua, and St. Maarten.

== Horseshoe Reef ==
Anegada is known for miles of white sand beaches and the 18-mile (29 km)-long Horseshoe Reef, one of the Caribbean's largest barrier coral reefs. The reef makes navigation to Anegada difficult. While charter boats freely sail among most of the other Virgin Islands, charter companies often forbid clients to sail to Anegada to avoid running aground on the reef.

The reef has caused hundreds of shipwrecks, including HMS Astraea in 1808, the Donna Paula (1819), and the MS Rocus (1929). As such, it was once an important scuba diving destination. In an effort to protect the reef, the BVI government has made anchoring on Horseshoe Reef illegal.

== Fauna ==
Anegada is also known for the large salt ponds that cover much of its west end. These ponds, which support unique fauna, were designated a Ramsar Site on 11 May 1999. In the 1830s, thousands of Caribbean flamingos lived in these ponds, but they were hunted for food and feathers throughout the 19th and early 20th centuries and disappeared by 1950. They have since been re-established. As of 2016, the flamingo flock numbers approximately 200. The birds are another tourist draw, but officials are trying to keep the number of visitors to the flamingo areas at a level that allows the birds to flourish. BirdLife International has recognized the western salt ponds and south-eastern coastal mangroves as an Important Bird Area (IBA).

Other rare or endangered animals include the Anegada rock iguana (Cyclura pinguis) and several species of turtle. Conch, Caribbean lobster (Metanephrops binghami), and many species of fish can be found near Anegada, particularly in the deep waters off the North Drop, north of the island.

The Ft. Worth Zoo now maintains an Anegada Rock "Headstart" facility in the Settlement. Newly hatched iguanas are caught in the wild, brought to the facility, and raised until they are large enough to defend themselves against the feral cats that are their only predator on Anegada. As of 2016, over 200 iguanas have been released from the Headstart program back into the wild. In addition, an annual Iguana Festival is held outside the Iguana Headstart Facility to celebrate the island's native species.

The reef adjacent to the Settlement was once one of the Caribbean's more fertile conch grounds, but overfishing has wiped out its conch population. Visitors to the Settlement are greeted by the sight of mountains of empty conch shells on the shore.

There are also populations of feral cattle, donkeys, goats, cows, and sheep that live in all areas of the island.

== Hurricanes ==
Anegadians traditionally endured hurricanes by tying their dories to the trunks of mangroves with rope and covering them with tarps. Today, given sufficient warning, a few leave the island for Tortola until the storm passes.

On 30 August 2010, the eye of Hurricane Earl passed 15 to 20 miles (24 to 32 km) north of Anegada at category 4, with winds in excess of 135 mph (60 m/s). The close passage led to significant damage on the island, with major flooding on the south side from the storm surge and breaking waves. The north side experienced no storm surge, and Horseshoe Reef protected it from breaking waves. 24 hours before the storm arrived, the forecast was for the storm to pass well to the north. By the time it was apparent that the hurricane was going to have a major impact, all transportation services from Anegada (air and ferry) had been suspended. There were no reported serious injuries on the island.

On 6 September 2017, the eye of Hurricane Irma passed 12 miles (19 km) south of Anegada at category 5, with winds in excess of 185 mph (83 m/s). Irma's northern eyewall passed directly over Anegada, causing major damage to the island. Some people evacuated to Tortola before the storm struck, but most people remained on the island. There was some flooding on the south side from the storm surge and breaking waves. The north side experienced no storm surge, and Horseshoe Reef protected it from breaking waves. There were no reported serious injuries on the island.

== Education ==
About 70 students attend school at the Claudia Creque Educational Centre, formerly Anegada Primary and Secondary School. This self-contained school is the only school on Anegada and handles pre-school, primary, and secondary levels. It is funded and operated by the British Virgin Islands government.

== See also ==
- List of lighthouses in the British Virgin Islands
