= Peter Island =

Private island in the British Virgin Islands

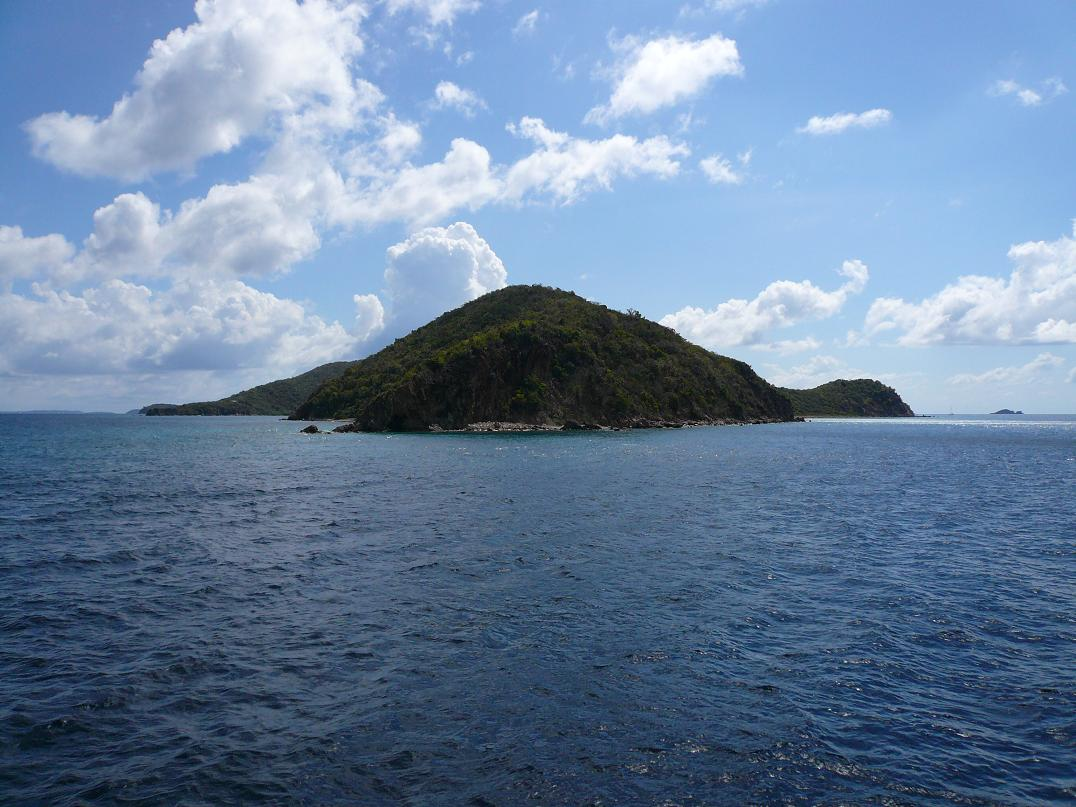
- Peter Island viewed from the uninhabited Western tip

- The location of Peter Island within the British Virgin Islands

- Location within British Virgin Islands Location within the Caribbean

Geography
- Location: Caribbean Sea
- Coordinates: 18.3534°N 64.5763°W
- Archipelago: Virgin Islands

Administration
- United Kingdom
- British Overseas Territory: British Virgin Islands

Additional information
- Time zone: AST (UTC-4)
- ISO code: VG

Peter Island is a 720 hectares (1,800 acres) private island located in the British Virgin Islands (BVI). It is about 5 miles (8.0 km) south-west (195 degrees true) from Road Town, Tortola. The island was named after Pieter Adriensen (nicknamed "The Commander") who was the brother of Abraham Adriensen, Patron of Tortola under the Dutch West India Company in the early 17th century. Pieter Adriensen and Joost van Dyk built a fort and slave pens at Great Harbour on Peter Island to facilitate privateering and the nascent trade in slaves from Angola.

In 1968, Torolf Smedvig purchased most of the land on the island for $950,000. He prefabricated 20 luxury A-frame chalets in Norway. In 1969, two ships with thousands of tons of prefabricated buildings, house trailers, concrete, lumber, plumbing supplies, tractors, earthmovers, cranes, and more came over from Norway. Accompanying them was 20 Norwegian craftsmen and works, who worked with about 30 island workers. It took about ten days to assemble the A-frames on-site. Dredging Sprat Bay made it deeper and reclaimed land for the resort to sit on. All the A-frames, the pool, the lobby, bar, dining room, and hotel offices were all built on reclaimed land. The resort also included a harbor and a marina. Peter Island Yacht Club was marketed as one of the premier holiday locations in the West Indies. It incorporated a hotel in cottage colonial style and plots of land for sale. However, the development was costly and occupancy rates low, leading to significant economic losses. After Torolf's death, the resort was put up for sale in 1978.

In 1978, the Devos family (Amway Corporation), purchased Peter Island after sailing past it several years before. There, they established the resort that exists today and lived on the island to maintain the resort.

Peter Island is the largest private island in the BVI and the fifth largest of the 60 islands, quays, and exposed reefs that comprise the BVI. It was owned by the Amway Corporation from 1978 until 2001 when full ownership was transferred to the Van Andel family, co-owners of Amway.

The island is predominantly undeveloped but contains hiking and biking trails on which to discover the tropical flora and fauna indigenous to Peter Island. The beaches face the Atlantic Ocean, the Caribbean Sea, and the Sir Francis Drake Channel. Two of the beaches (Honeymoon and White bay) are for use by guests only. The island's biggest beach is Deadman's Bay, a mile-long crescent beach shaded by palm trees with a beach, bar, and restaurant open to day boaters. Deadman's Bay is said to be named for pirates that were marooned on neighbouring Dead Chest island and subsequently drowned swimming to Peter Island, their bodies washed up on shore.

The only hotel, the 52-room Peter Island Resort, ranked in Conde Nast Traveler's "Gold List", and the Travel and Leisure "T+L 500" for 2007, is accessible by boat or helicopter. A 1984 review in The New York Times was critical of the food. It has since twice been named by Conde Nast Traveler as one of the "Best Places to Stay in the World".
