= Salt Island, British Virgin Islands =

Island in the British Virgin Islands

Salt Island
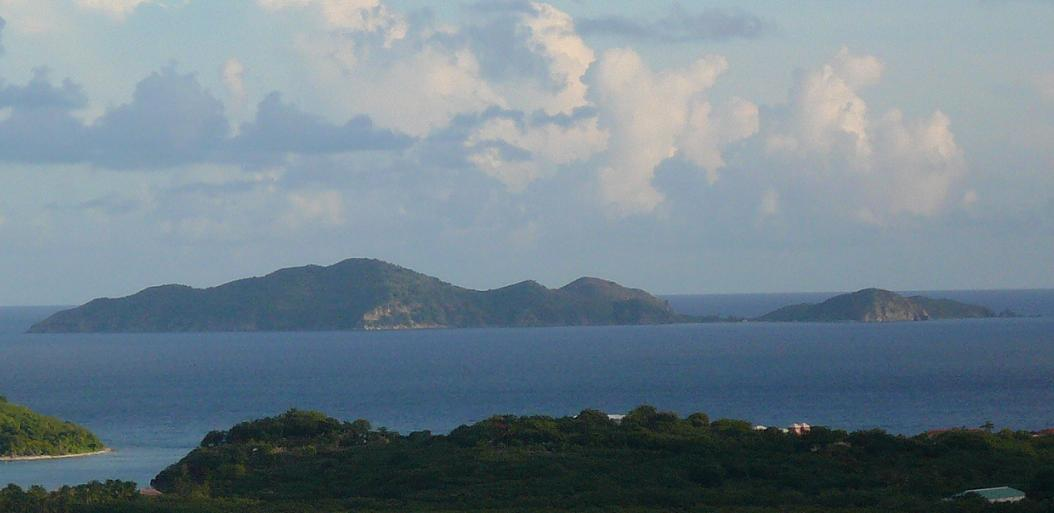
- Salt Island seen from Tortola. The wreck of the Rhone lies off Black Rock point on the west of the island (the right hand side of the picture).

- The location of Salt Island within the British Virgin Islands

- Location within British Virgin Islands Location within the Caribbean

Geography
- Location: Caribbean Sea
- Coordinates: 18.3759°N 64.5281°W
- Archipelago: Virgin Islands

Administration
- United Kingdom
- British Overseas Territory: British Virgin Islands

Additional information
- Time zone: AST (UTC-4)
- ISO code: VG
- Salt Island Lighthouse
- Height: 5 m (16 ft)
- Power source: solar power
- Focal height: 53 m (174 ft)
- Range: 14 nmi (26 km; 16 mi)
- Characteristic: Fl W 10s

Salt Island is one of the islands of the archipelago of the British Virgin Islands located about 4.7 miles south east (151 degrees true) of Road Town, the main town on Tortola. It is named after its salt ponds, which were once an important resource.

Salt Island is most notable for the wreck of the Royal Mail packet steamer, RMS Rhone which sank in a hurricane on 29 October 1867 after she was driven back on Salt Island while attempting to head to safety at sea. Most of the ship's crew were lost, while recovered bodies were buried in a mass grave on Salt Island. It is a short walk from the main beach and can be easily seen today, with a wide circle of stones laid upon the grave.

The wreck of the Rhone is one of the best scuba diving sites in the Caribbean. Some of the underwater scenes in the film The Deep were filmed in and around the wreck.

The population of the island hasn't been more than three since at least 1980. They pay an annual symbolic rent of one pound of salt to the British Crown, delivered to the Governor of the British Virgin Islands.

The island is often visited by yachts and the occasional smaller cruise ship. Where before there were twenty or more households there are now only three or four derelict houses.

== Annual salt tribute ==
The salt harvesting was once an annual tradition on the Island since the reign of Queen Victoria in 1867, when residents would gather annually. It became customary for the Administrator of the Virgin Islands (later the Governor) to send one pound of salt to the Sovereign on their birthday.

The tradition subsequently faded, but Governor John Duncan decided to revive it. In March 2015, he personally presented the pound of salt in London to Queen Elizabeth II, as a gift from the people of the British Virgin Islands. The specific batch of salt had been harvested specially for the occasion by Calvin "Jandy" Smith of East End, Tortola. At the annual parade celebrating the Queen's Official Birthday on 13 June 2015, Duncan announced the tradition of presenting a pound of salt to the Sovereign would continue in future years.

== See also ==
- List of lighthouses in the British Virgin Islands
