= Ginger Island =

Island in the British Virgin Islands

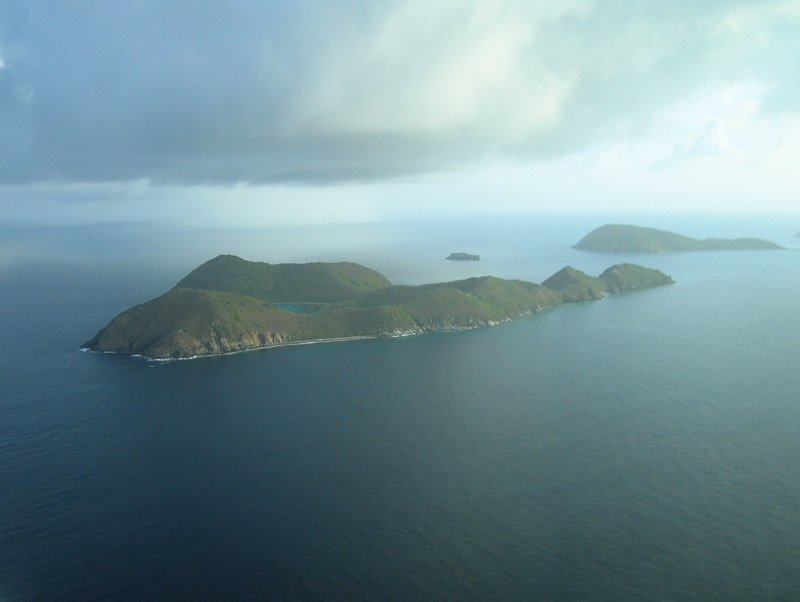
- An aerial view of the Ginger Island and Cooper Island

- The location of Ginger Island within the British Virgin Islands

- Location within British Virgin Islands Location within the Caribbean

Geography
- Location: Caribbean Sea
- Coordinates: 18.3934°N 64.4778°W
- Archipelago: Virgin Islands

Administration
- United Kingdom
- British Overseas Territory: British Virgin Islands

Additional information
- Time zone: AST (UTC-4)
- ISO code: VG
- Ginger Island light
- Height: 4 m (13 ft)
- Markings: Yellow
- Power source: solar power
- Operator: private
- Focal height: 53 m (174 ft)
- Range: 14 nmi (26 km; 16 mi)

Ginger Island is a currently uninhabited island of the British Virgin Islands in the Caribbean. It is one of the last undeveloped privately held islands in the territory. The island is roughly 258 acres (104 ha) in size. It is the location of two of the better dive sites in the British Virgin Islands: "Alice in Wonderland" and "Ginger Steppes". The island is owned by Texas oil billionaire William Harrison. Most people do not go on the island, as there is no dockage and the island is very overgrown.

== See also ==
- List of lighthouses in the British Virgin Islands
