= Outline of the British Virgin Islands =

Overview of and topical guide to the British Virgin Islands

The Flag of the British Virgin Islands

The Coat of arms of the British Virgin Islands

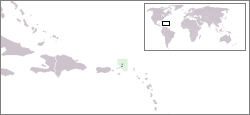
The location of the British Virgin Islands

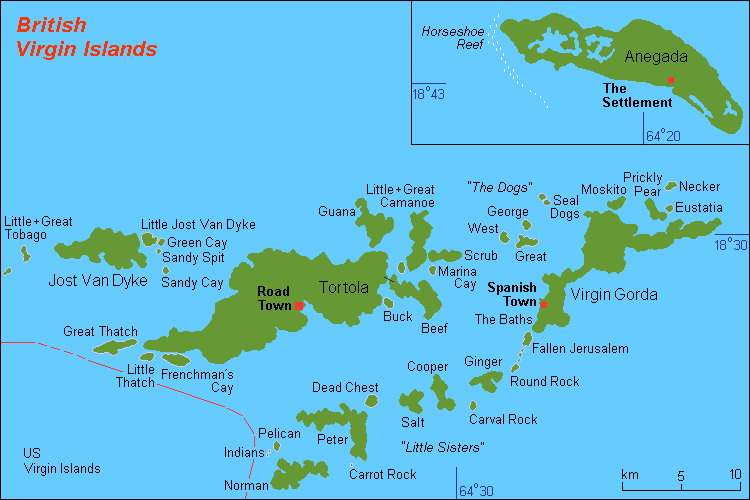
An enlargeable map of the British Virgin Islands

The following outline is provided as an overview of and topical guide to the British Virgin Islands:

British Virgin Islands (BVI) – British overseas territory located in the eastern portion of the Virgin Islands Archipelago in the Caribbean Sea. The Virgin Islands are part of the Leeward Islands of the Lesser Antilles. The United States Virgin Islands comprises the western portion of the archipelago. Technically the name of the Territory is simply the "Virgin Islands", but in practice since 1917 they have been almost universally referred to as the "British Virgin Islands" to distinguish the islands from the American Territory. To add to the regional confusion, the Puerto Rican islands of Culebra, Vieques and surrounding islands began referring to themselves as the "Spanish Virgin Islands" as part of a tourism drive in the early 2000s.

The British Virgin Islands consist of the main islands of Tortola, Virgin Gorda, Anegada and Jost Van Dyke, along with over fifty other smaller islands and cays. Approximately fifteen of the islands are inhabited. The largest island, Tortola, is approximately 20 km (approx. 12 mi) long and 5 km (approx. 3 mi) wide. The islands have a total population of about 22,000, of whom approximately 18,000 live on Tortola. Road Town, the capital, is situated on Tortola.

== General reference ==
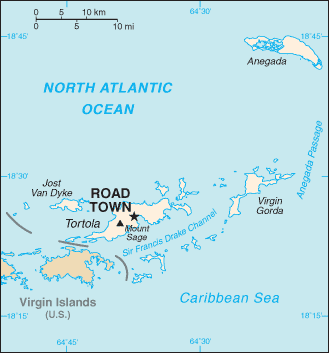
An enlargeable basic map of the British Virgin Islands

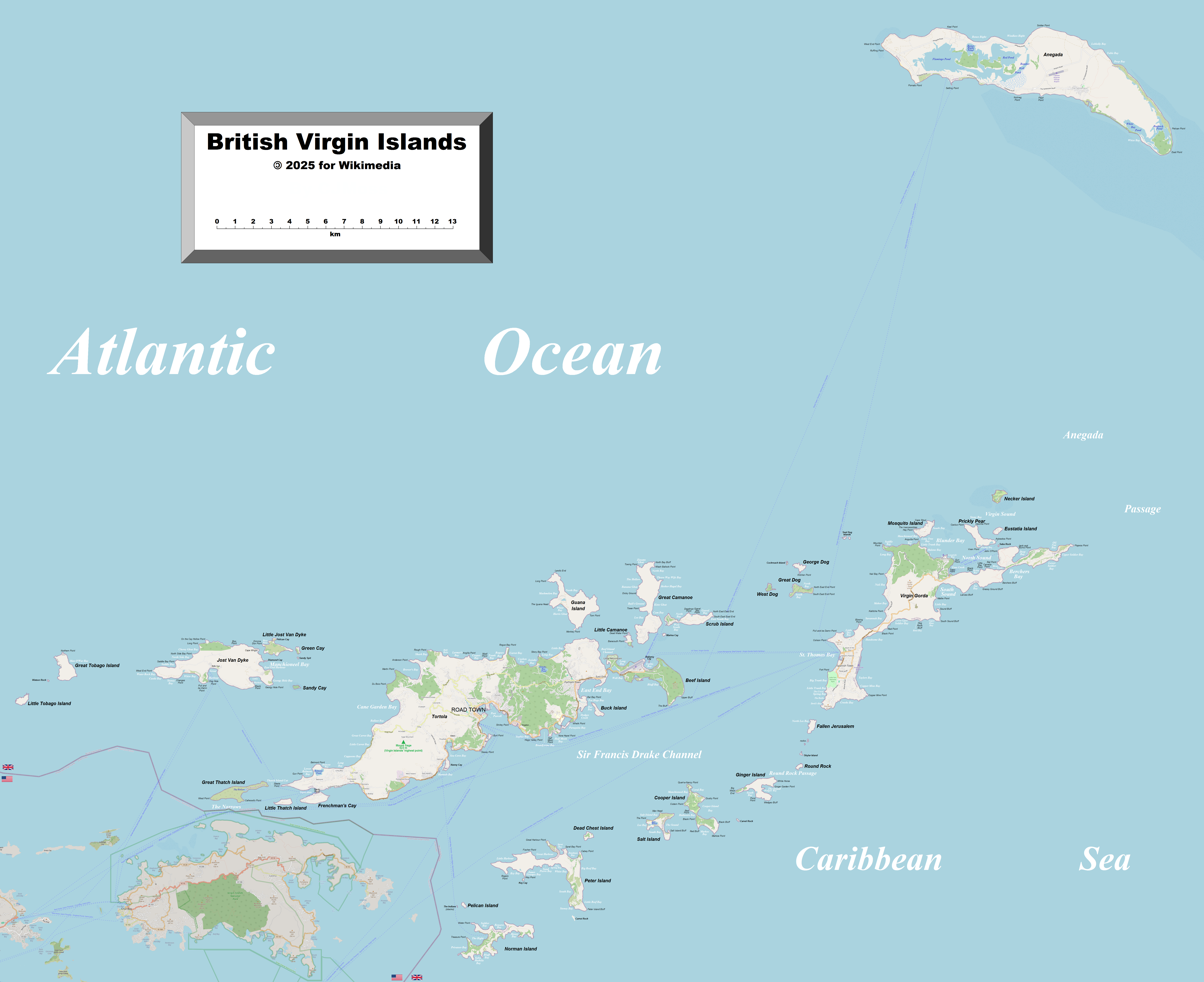
An enlargeable detailed map of the British Virgin Islands

- Pronunciation:
- Common English country name: The British Virgin Islands
- Official English country name: Virgin Islands
- Common endonym(s):
- Official endonym(s):
- Adjectival(s): Virgin Island
- Demonym(s):
- ISO country codes: VG, VGB, 092
- ISO region codes: See ISO 3166-2:VG
- Internet country code top-level domain: .vg

== Geography of the British Virgin Islands ==
Geography of the British Virgin Islands

- The British Virgin Islands are: a British overseas territory
- Location:
  - Northern Hemisphere and Western Hemisphere
    - North America (though not on the mainland)
  - Atlantic Ocean
    - North Atlantic
      - Caribbean, east of Puerto Rico
        - Antilles
          - Lesser Antilles
            - Leeward Islands
              - Virgin Islands archipelago
  - Time zone: Eastern Caribbean Time (UTC-04)
  - Extreme points of the British Virgin Islands
    - High: Mount Sage 521 m (1,709 ft)
    - Low: Caribbean Sea 0 m
  - Land boundaries: none
  - Coastline: 80 km
- Population of the British Virgin Islands: 2005 census: 22,016
- Area of the British Virgin Islands: 153 km²
- Atlas of the British Virgin Islands

=== Environment of the British Virgin Islands ===
- Climate of the British Virgin Islands
- Renewable energy in the British Virgin Islands
- Geology of the British Virgin Islands
- Protected areas of the British Virgin Islands
  - Biosphere reserves in the British Virgin Islands
  - National parks of the British Virgin Islands
- Wildlife of the British Virgin Islands
  - Fauna of the British Virgin Islands
    - Birds of the British Virgin Islands
    - Mammals of the British Virgin Islands

==== Natural geographic features of the British Virgin Islands ====
- Fjords of the British Virgin Islands
- Glaciers of the British Virgin Islands
- Islands of the British Virgin Islands
- Lakes of the British Virgin Islands
- Mountains of the British Virgin Islands
  - Volcanoes in the British Virgin Islands
- Rivers of the British Virgin Islands
  - Waterfalls of the British Virgin Islands
- Valleys of the British Virgin Islands
- World Heritage Sites in the British Virgin Islands: None

Ecoregions of the British Virgin Islands

List of ecoregions in the British Virgin Islands

==== Administrative divisions of the British Virgin Islands ====
Administrative divisions of the British Virgin Islands

- Districts of the British Virgin Island
- Capital of the British Virgin Islands: Road Town
- Towns of the British Virgin Islands

=== Demography of the British Virgin Islands ===
Demographics of the British Virgin Islands

== Government and politics of the British Virgin Islands ==
Politics of the British Virgin Islands

- Form of government: parliamentary representative democratic dependency
- Capital of the British Virgin Islands: Road Town
- Elections in the British Virgin Islands
- Political parties in the British Virgin Islands
- Taxation in the British Virgin Islands

=== Branches of the government of the British Virgin Islands ===
Government of the British Virgin Islands

==== Executive branch of the government of the British Virgin Islands ====
- Head of state: Monarch of the United Kingdom, King Charles III
  - Monarch's representative: Governor of the British Virgin Islands, Daniel Pruce
- Head of government: Premier of the British Virgin Islands, Natalio Wheatley
- Cabinet: Cabinet of the British Virgin Islands

==== Legislative branch of the government of the British Virgin Islands ====
- House of Assembly of the British Virgin Islands (unicameral)

==== Judicial branch of the government of the British Virgin Islands ====
Court system of the British Virgin Islands

- Eastern Caribbean Supreme Court
  - High Court of Justice of the British Virgin Islands
  - Court of Appeal of the British Virgin Islands
- Magistrate's Court of the British Virgin Islands
- Juvenile Court of the British Virgin Islands
- Court of Summary Jurisdiction of the British Virgin Islands

=== Foreign relations of the British Virgin Islands ===
Foreign relations of the British Virgin Islands

- Diplomatic missions in the British Virgin Islands
- Diplomatic missions of the British Virgin Islands

==== International organization membership ====
The government of the British Virgin Islands is a member of:

- Caribbean Community and Common Market (Caricom) (associate)
- Caribbean Development Bank (CDB)
- International Criminal Police Organization (Interpol) (subbureau)
- International Olympic Committee (IOC)
- Organization of Eastern Caribbean States (OECS)
- United Nations Educational, Scientific, and Cultural Organization (UNESCO) (associate)
- Universal Postal Union (UPU)
- World Federation of Trade Unions (WFTU)

=== Law and order in the British Virgin Islands ===
Law of the British Virgin Islands

- Constitution of the British Virgin Islands
- Crime in the British Virgin Islands
- Human rights in the British Virgin Islands
  - LGBT rights in the British Virgin Islands
  - Freedom of religion in the British Virgin Islands
- Law enforcement in the British Virgin Islands

=== Military of the British Virgin Islands ===
Military of the British Virgin Islands

- Command
  - Commander-in-chief:
    - Ministry of Defence of the British Virgin Islands
- Forces
  - Army of the British Virgin Islands
  - Navy of the British Virgin Islands
  - Air Force of the British Virgin Islands
  - Special forces of the British Virgin Islands
- Military history of the British Virgin Islands
- Military ranks of the British Virgin Islands

=== Local government in the British Virgin Islands ===
Local government in the British Virgin Islands

== History of the British Virgin Islands ==
History of the British Virgin Islands

- Timeline of the history of the British Virgin Islands
- Current events of the British Virgin Islands
- Military history of the British Virgin Islands

== Culture of the British Virgin Islands ==
Culture of the British Virgin Islands

- Architecture of the British Virgin Islands
- Cuisine of the British Virgin Islands
- Festivals in the British Virgin Islands
- Languages of the British Virgin Islands
- Media in the British Virgin Islands
- National symbols of the British Virgin Islands
  - Coat of arms of the British Virgin Islands
  - Flag of the British Virgin Islands
  - National anthem of the British Virgin Islands
- People of the British Virgin Islands
- Public holidays in the British Virgin Islands
- Records of the British Virgin Islands
- Religion in the British Virgin Islands
  - Christianity in the British Virgin Islands
  - Hinduism in the British Virgin Islands
  - Islam in the British Virgin Islands
  - Judaism in the British Virgin Islands
  - Sikhism in the British Virgin Islands
- World Heritage Sites in the British Virgin Islands: None

=== Art in the British Virgin Islands ===
- Art in the British Virgin Islands
- Cinema of the British Virgin Islands
- Literature of the British Virgin Islands

=== Literature ===
Among the noted names in Virgin Islands literature are Alphaeus Osario Norman (1885-1942), Verna Penn Moll, Jennie Wheatley, and Patricia G. Turnbull. Their poetry and that of 22 other writers, including the fastly emerging poet and literary critic Richard Georges, can be found in Where I See the Sun – Contemporary Poetry in The Virgin Islands (Tortola, Virgin Gorda, Anegada, Jost Van Dyke), an anthology edited by Lasana M. Sekou in 2016.

- Music of the British Virgin Islands
- Television in the British Virgin Islands
- Theatre in the British Virgin Islands

=== Sports in the British Virgin Islands ===
Sports in the British Virgin Islands

- Football in the British Virgin Islands
- British Virgin Islands at the Olympics
- British Virgin Islands at the 2006 Commonwealth Games

== Economy and infrastructure of the British Virgin Islands ==
Economy of the British Virgin Islands

- Economic rank, by nominal GDP (2007): 170th (one hundred and seventieth)
- Agriculture in the British Virgin Islands
- Banking in the British Virgin Islands
  - National Bank of the British Virgin Islands
- Communications in the British Virgin Islands
  - Internet in the British Virgin Islands
- Companies of the British Virgin Islands
- Currency of the British Virgin Islands: Dollar
  - ISO 4217: USD
- Energy in the British Virgin Islands
  - Energy policy of the British Virgin Islands
  - Oil industry in the British Virgin Islands
- Mining in the British Virgin Islands
- British Virgin Islands Stock Exchange
- Tourism in the British Virgin Islands
- Transport in the British Virgin Islands
  - Airports in the British Virgin Islands

== Education in the British Virgin Islands ==
Education in the British Virgin Islands

== See also ==
British Virgin Islands

- Index of British Virgin Islands-related articles
- List of British Virgin Islands-related topics
- List of international rankings
- Outline of geography
- Outline of North America
- Outline of the Caribbean
- Outline of the United Kingdom
