= List of British Virgin Islands–related topics =

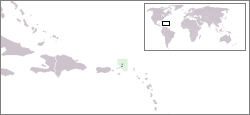
The location of the British Overseas Territory of the Virgin Islands

The following is an outline of topics related to the British Overseas Territory of the Virgin Islands.

== British Virgin Islands ==
- British Virgin Islands
- British Virgin Islands Bar Association
- British Virgin Islands Financial Services Commission
- British Virgin Islands at the 2006 Commonwealth Games
- Coat of arms of the British Virgin Islands
- Colonial Heads of the British Virgin Islands
- Cyril Romney
- Dead Man's Chest Island
- Demographics of the British Virgin Islands
- Districts of the British Virgin Islands
- Flag of the British Virgin Islands
- Geography of the British Virgin Islands
- HMS Astraea
- HMS Nymph
- Heads of government of the British Virgin Islands
- ISO 3166-1 alpha-2 country code for the British Virgin Islands: VG
- ISO 3166-1 alpha-3 country code for the British Virgin Islands: VGB
- Islands of British Virgin Islands
- Lavity Stoutt
- List of BVIslanders
- List of presidents of the British Virgin Islands
- Military of the British Virgin Islands
- Music of the Virgin Islands
- Necker Island (British Virgin Islands)
- Norman Island
- Orlando Smith
- Peter Island
- Queen Elizabeth II Bridge, British Virgin Islands
- RMS Rhone
- Road Town
- Roman Catholic Diocese of St. John's - Bassetere
- Salt Island, British Virgin Islands
- The Scout Association of the British Virgin Islands
- St Phillip's Church, Tortola
- Virgin Islands Creole
- Willard Wheatley
- Area code 284

== Buildings and structures in the British Virgin Islands ==
=== Airports in the British Virgin Islands ===
- Auguste George Airport
- Terrance B. Lettsome International Airport
- Virgin Gorda Airport

=== Historical buildings in the British Virgin Islands ===
- Copper Mine, Virgin Gorda
- Fort Burt
- Fort Charlotte, Tortola
- Fort George, Tortola
- Fort Purcell
- Fort Recovery
- Road Town Fort
- St Phillip's Church, Tortola

== Communications in the British Virgin Islands ==
- Communications on the British Virgin Islands
- Area code 284
- .vg Internet country code top-level domain for the British Virgin Islands

=== Television stations in the British Virgin Islands ===
- Template:UKVI TV
- ZBTV
- VITV

== Economy of the British Virgin Islands ==
- Economy of the British Virgin Islands

== History of the British Virgin Islands ==
- Arthur William Hodge
- History of the British Virgin Islands
- Jost Van Dyke
- Long Look Estate
- St Phillip's Church, Tortola

=== Elections in the British Virgin Islands ===
- Elections in the British Virgin Islands

== People of the British Virgin Islands ==
- Dion Crabbe
- Ralph T. O'Neal
- Dancia Penn
- Michael Riegels
- Cyril Romney
- Orlando Smith
- Lavity Stoutt
- William Thornton
- Willard Wheatley

=== Politicians of the British Virgin Islands ===
- Governor of the British Virgin Islands
- Heads of government of the British Virgin Islands
- List of presidents of the British Virgin Islands
- Tom Macan
- Ralph T. O'Neal
- David Pearey
- Cyril Romney
- Orlando Smith
- Lavity Stoutt
- Willard Wheatley

=== British Virgin Islands athletes ===
- Dion Crabbe
- Tahesia Harrigan
- Kyron McMaster

== Politics of the British Virgin Islands ==
- Governor of the British Virgin Islands
- House of Assembly of the British Virgin Islands
- Cabinet of the British Virgin Islands
- Politics of the British Virgin Islands
- List of elected politicians in the British Virgin Islands

=== Political parties in the British Virgin Islands ===
- List of political parties in the British Virgin Islands
- National Democratic Party (British Virgin Islands)
- United Party (British Virgin Islands)
- Virgin Islands Party
- VI Democratic Party

== Sport in the British Virgin Islands ==
- British Virgin Islands at the 2006 Commonwealth Games
- Leeward Islands cricket team

=== Football in the British Virgin Islands ===
- British Virgin Islands Football Association
- British Virgin Islands national football team

==== Football venues in the British Virgin Islands ====
- Sherly Ground

=== British Virgin Islands at the Olympics ===
- British Virgin Islands at the 2000 Summer Olympics
- British Virgin Islands at the 2004 Summer Olympics

== Transport in the British Virgin Islands ==
- Transport in the British Virgin Islands

== See also ==
- List of Caribbean-related topics
- List of international rankings
- Lists of country-related topics
- Outline of geography
- Outline of North America
