= Foreign relations of the British Virgin Islands =

The foreign relations of the British Virgin Islands are largely conducted on behalf of the British Virgin Islands Government by the United Kingdom through the Foreign and Commonwealth Office as a result of the Territory's status as a British Overseas Territory. However the Constitution of the British Virgin Islands provides that this power is delegated to Premier and Ministers of Government in relation to certain specific areas:

1. the Caribbean Community, the Organisation of Eastern Caribbean States, the Association of Caribbean States, the United Nations Economic Commission for Latin America and the Caribbean, or any other Caribbean regional organisation or institution;
2. other Caribbean regional affairs relating specifically to issues that are of interest to or affect the British Virgin Islands;
3. the relationship between the British Virgin Islands and the United States Virgin Islands in matters of mutual interest;
4. tourism and tourism-related matters;
5. taxation and the regulation of finance and financial services; and
6. European Union matters directly affecting the interests of the Territory.

However there are a number of restrictions imposed by the Constitution upon the exercise by Ministers of that delegated power, including the need for separate authority from the Secretary of State to conclude any treaty or other international agreement, and the requirement to keep the Governor "fully informed" of relevant activities and to provide on request all papers and information relating to such matters.

In turn the British Government has indicated in a letter of entrustment that will consult fully with the British Virgin Islands in relation to matters which are reserved to the United Kingdom Government, including defence, internal security and civil aviation.

Due to their status as an overseas territory of the United Kingdom, the British Virgin Islands have no representation either on the United Nations, or in most other international organisations. Nor do they enjoy direct consular arrangements with any other country. However, the British Virgin Islands still participates in some international organisations.

== Territorial disputes ==
The British Virgin Islands is not party to any Territorial disputes.

During its history there have been some minor disagreements as the scope of the Territory, all of which were resolved amicably and in each case the British Virgin Islands ceded the relevant territory.

- After taking control of the islands from the Dutch, the British also initially claimed Saint Croix (then known as "Santa Cruz"), but abandoned that claim in 1729.
- In the period immediately after the collapse of the Federation of the West Indies, it was unclear which group Sombrero Island (also known as "Hat Island") would belong to, but the British Virgin Islands formally ceded the island to Anguilla by statute.
- In the 1970s disagreement arose between the British Virgin Islands and the United States Virgin Islands as to which side of the maritime boundary Flanagan Island (formerly known as "Witch Island") fell on. The British relinquished their claim in 1977 in favour of the Americans, who thereafter declared Flanagan to be a nature reserve.

== International organisations ==
The British Virgin Islands participates in most international organisations through the United Kingdom. However, the British Virgin Islands is also a member of a number of international organisations in its own right, including:

Intergovernmental organisations

- Association of Caribbean States
- Caribbean Community (associate member)
- Caribbean Development Bank
- Interpol (sub-bureau)
- Organisation of Eastern Caribbean States
- UNESCO (associate member)
- UK–Overseas Territories Joint Ministerial Council
- United Kingdom Overseas Territories Association
- United Nations Economic Commission for Latin America and the Caribbean (associate)
- Universal Postal Union

International sports federations

- Commonwealth Games Federation
- FIFA (CONCACAF)
- International Olympic Committee
- World Athletics (NACAC)
- World Rugby (associate)

As a dependent territory, the British Virgin Islands is not technically a free standing member of the Commonwealth of Nations, but in practice operates much in the same as if it were, competing in the Commonwealth Games and otherwise participating in the organisation.

== See also ==
- Foreign relations of the United Kingdom
- British Overseas Territories
- Membership of British Overseas Territories and Crown Dependencies in international organisations
