= Elmore Stoutt High School =

Location
- Road Town; British Virgin Islands
- Coordinates: 18.4254834°N 64.62246749999997°W

Information
- Type: Secondary school
- Affiliation: Government of the British Virgin Islands

Elmore Stoutt High School is a grade 7-12 secondary school in Road Town, Tortola. It is the largest secondary school in the British Virgin Islands and plays a central role in public education across the territory. Named after long-time local educator Elmore Stoutt, the school has overcome significant challenges in recent years, including extensive damage from Hurricane Irma in 2017 and a five-year period in temporary facilities before reopening its rebuilt campus in 2023.

== History ==
Elmore Stoutt High School was previously known as BVI High School. The school was named after long-time local educator Elmore Stoutt.

In September 2012, Wade Tobin became acting principal, but Vanessa Garraway replaced him when he was hospitalised at Peebles Hospital to undergo treatment.

In 2017, Hurricane Irma damaged the school building as part of its effects in the British Virgin Islands, so students had to move to the former Clarence Thomas Ltd building in Pasea Estate. Because the temporary building was not large enough to accommodate all students, they were divided into two shifts. Students in the morning shift participated in after-school programs to keep themselves occupied. In June 2018, students and alumni of the school held a Unity Concert to raise funds for the school's music programme, which was severely affected by the hurricane. Featuring performances from current students, alumni, and guest musicians, the event helped advance the school's $60,000 fundraising goal and was praised by Principal Sandy Underhill as a symbol of community resilience and support. More than five years later, the rebuilt school reopened in January 2023.

== Campus ==
Elmore Stoutt High School is the largest secondary school in the British Virgin Islands.

The Lillian Adorothy Turnbull Building is L-shaped and received its current name in 2019, named after the veteran educator who contributed to the development of education for 50 years.

== See also ==
- Education in the British Virgin Islands
