= UK–Overseas Territories Joint Ministerial Council =

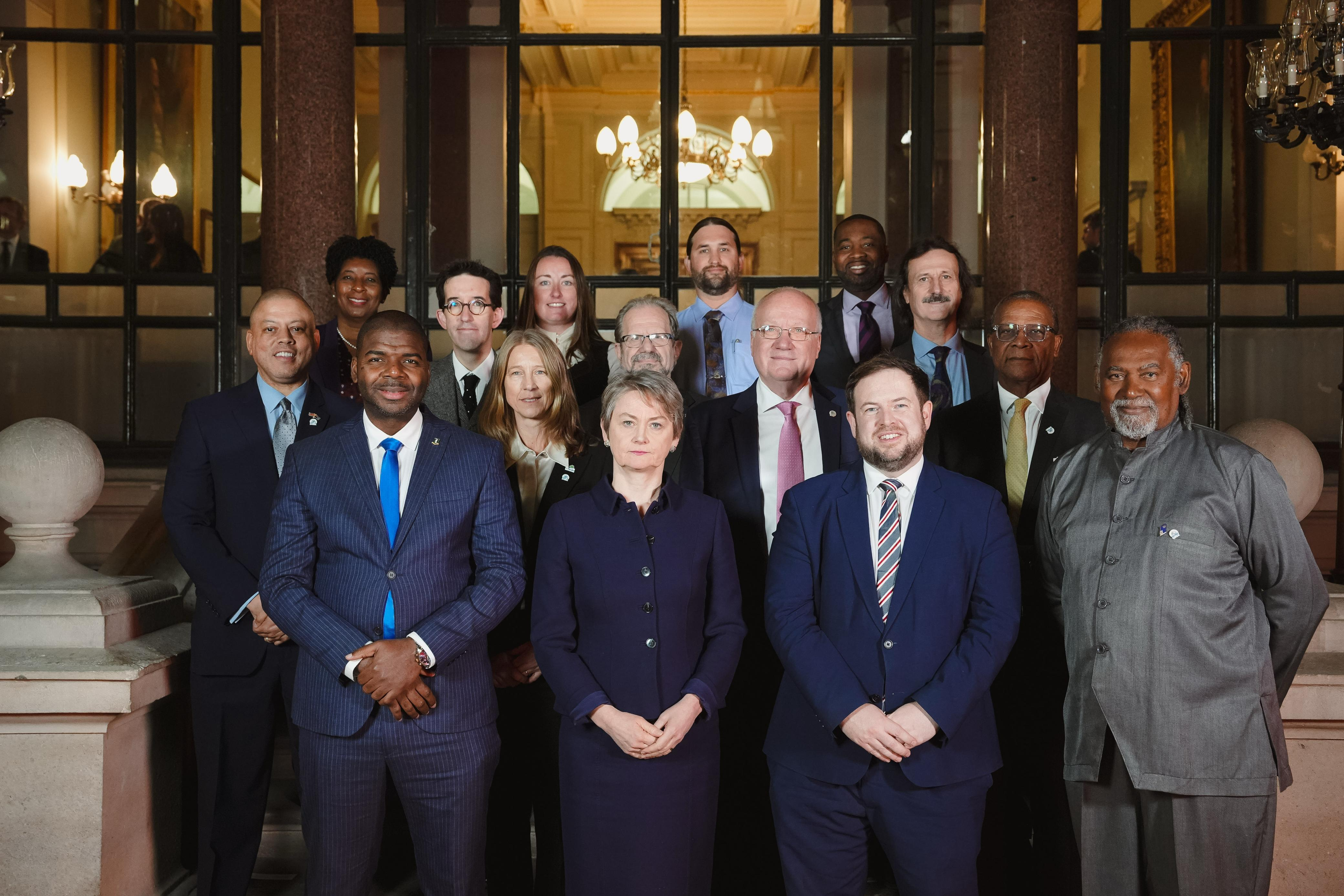
- Members of the UK–Overseas Territories Joint Ministerial Council in November 2025
- Formation: December 4, 2012; 13 years ago
- Legal status: Joint committee
- Purpose: Intergovernmental relations
- Region served: United Kingdom and British Overseas Territories
- Members: United Kingdom; Anguilla; Ascension Island; Bermuda; British Virgin Islands; Cayman Islands; Falkland Islands; Gibraltar; Montserrat; Pitcairn Islands; Saint Helena; Sovereign Base Areas; Tristan da Cunha; Turks and Caicos Islands
- Chair: Minister for the Overseas Territories
- Website: https://www.gov.uk/government/topical-events/overseas-territories-joint-ministerial-council

The UK–Overseas Territories Joint Ministerial Council is a joint committee that brings together ministers from the UK Government and the leaders of the governments of the British Overseas Territories. The council was established in 2012 and superseded the earlier Overseas Territories Consultative Councils. It meets once a year at Lancaster House or FCDO King Charles Street, in London.

== Purpose ==
Following the first meeting in December 2012, it was agreed that the council should:

- Provide a forum for the exchange of views on political and constitutional issues between the governments of the British Overseas Territories and the UK Government
- Promote the security and good governance of the Territories and their sustainable economic and social development
- Agree priorities, develop plans and review implementation

== Membership ==
The following governments participate in the council:

Polity	Government
United Kingdom	Government of the United Kingdom
Anguilla	Government of Anguilla
Ascension Island	Ascension Island Government
Bermuda	Government of Bermuda
British Virgin Islands	Government of the British Virgin Islands
Cayman Islands	Government of the Cayman Islands
Falkland Islands	Government of the Falkland Islands
Gibraltar	Government of Gibraltar
Montserrat	Government of Montserrat
Pitcairn Islands	Government of the Pitcairn Islands
Saint Helena	Government of Saint Helena
Sovereign Base Areas of Akrotiri and Dhekelia	Sovereign Base Areas Administration
Tristan da Cunha	Tristan da Cunha Government
Turks and Caicos Islands	Government of the Turks and Caicos Islands

== Meetings ==
Overview of the UK–Overseas Territories Joint Ministerial Council meetings
Date	Chair	Statement
4-5 December 2012		
26-27 November 2013	Mark Simmonds	
2-3 December 2014	James Duddridge	
1-2 December 2015	James Duddridge	
1-2 November 2016	Joyce Anelay, Baroness Anelay of St Johns	
28-19 November 2017	Tariq Ahmad, Baron Ahmad of Wimbledon	
4-5 December 2018	Tariq Ahmad, Baron Ahmad of Wimbledon	
23-26 November 2020		
16-17 November 2021	Amanda Milling	
11-12 May 2023	Zac Goldsmith, Baron Goldsmith of Richmond Park	
14-15 November 2023	David Rutley	
19-21 November 2024	Stephen Doughty	
24-27 November 2025	Stephen Doughty	

== See also ==
- Intergovernmental relations in the United Kingdom
- United Kingdom Overseas Territories Association
- Membership of British Overseas Territories and Crown Dependencies in international organisations
