= United Kingdom Overseas Territories Association =

- Logo
- Headquarters: London, United Kingdom
- Official language: English

Leaders
  - Chair: Tasha Ebanks Garcia
  - Secretary: Tracy Knight
  - Treasurer: Chris Carnegy

Establishment
  - Dependent Territories Conference: 2003
- Website; UKOTA

The United Kingdom Overseas Territories Association (UKOTA) is an intergovernmental organisation that exists to promote the interests of the United Kingdom Overseas Territories and co-operation between them. It was established in 1993 during the first Dependent Territories Conference.

== Member states ==
The following 12 British Overseas Territories are full members of UKOTA:

- Anguilla
- Ascension Island
- Bermuda
- British Virgin Islands
- Cayman Islands
- Falkland Islands
- Gibraltar
- Montserrat
- Pitcairn Islands
- Saint Helena
- Tristan da Cunha
- Turks and Caicos Islands

== Non-member territories ==
Akrotiri and Dhekelia is the only British Overseas Territory with a permanent civilian population, that is not a member of UKOTA. The other non-member British Overseas Territories are those whose population is entirely transitory, being either military or scientific personnel, or have been forcibly removed namely the British Antarctic Territory, British Indian Ocean Territory, and South Georgia and the South Sandwich Islands.

== See also ==
- UK–Overseas Territories Joint Ministerial Council
- Membership of British Overseas Territories and Crown Dependencies in international organisations
