= St. Phillip's Anglican Church (British Virgin Islands) =

Church in Tortola, British Virgin Islands

Coordinates: 18.41605°N 64.59508°W

St. Phillip's Anglican Church, also known as the African Church, in the Kingstown area of Tortola in British Virgin Islands, was built in 1840 by a community of Africans who had been liberated from illegal slave ships.

By the early 21st century, the building had fallen into disrepair, as it had not been regularly used for decades. Efforts to stabilize the remains are underway; it is a unique historic site in the islands. Local historians claim it is the oldest free black church building to survive in the Americas. Although free African Americans established churches at the turn of the 19th century in Philadelphia, Pennsylvania, in the United States, those early church buildings have been replaced.

== History ==
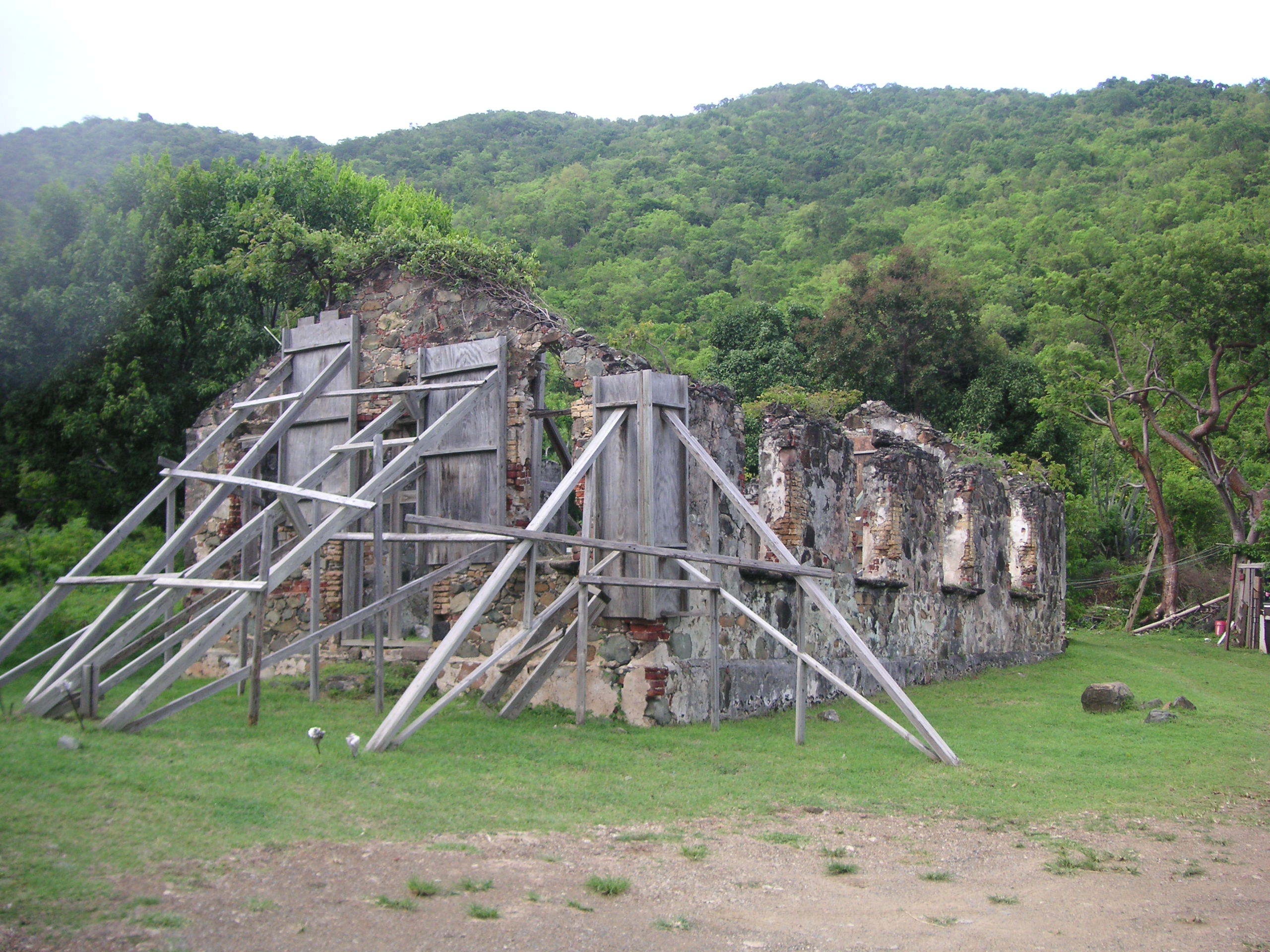
The restoration work underway at St Phillip's Anglican Church to stabilize the remains

Great Britain prohibited the African slave trade under the Slave Trade Act 1807. The United States followed with its own prohibition, to go into effect in 1808. The Royal Navy patrolled the Caribbean to intercept foreign ships illegally carrying slaves to the Americas. Other parts of the fleet operated off Africa. In January 1808, HMS Cerberus seized the American schooner, the Nancy, with a cargo of enslaved Senegalese in the territory's waters. It liberated the slaves and settled the Africans in the Bahamas.

Between August 1814 and February 1815, the Royal Navy seized slave cargos from the Venus, the Manuella, the Atrevido, and the Candelaria. It deposited 1,318 liberated Africans on Tortola, which the government designated for free black settlement. In 1819, a Portuguese slave ship, the Donna Paula, was wrecked upon the reef at Anegada. The ship's crew and 235 slaves were saved from the wreckage, and taken to the islands. Other shipwrecks off Anegada were reported in 1817 and 1824. Liberated Africans sometimes died due to having suffered harsh conditions in the Middle Passage.

The British offered liberated Africans a chance to serve with the military on larger islands; an opportunity that many accepted. A number stayed and settled in the territory. They were required to serve an "apprenticeship" or indenture of 14 years, after which they were absolutely free. In 1828 the liberated Africans were given certificates of freedom, so as not to be confused with slaves.

The colonial government provided land for the liberated Africans. In 1831 the area now known as Kingstown on Tortola, which was then uninhabited, was put aside and subdivided. (This is not to be confused with Kingston, Jamaica.) Each newly freed African was allocated a plot of land for a house and growing provision crops. Many converted to Christianity. The colonial government supported their construction of an Anglican stone church close to the shore of the Kingstown area; it was dedicated to St. Phillip.

The free Africans lived in a sometimes uneasy condition between the colonial whites (who considered them a burden and likely a subversive influence on slaves) and the mass of slaves. The free Africans developed a solidarity within their community but suffered discrimination. They were relatively isolated from slaves and worked to preserve their free status.

== 21st century ==
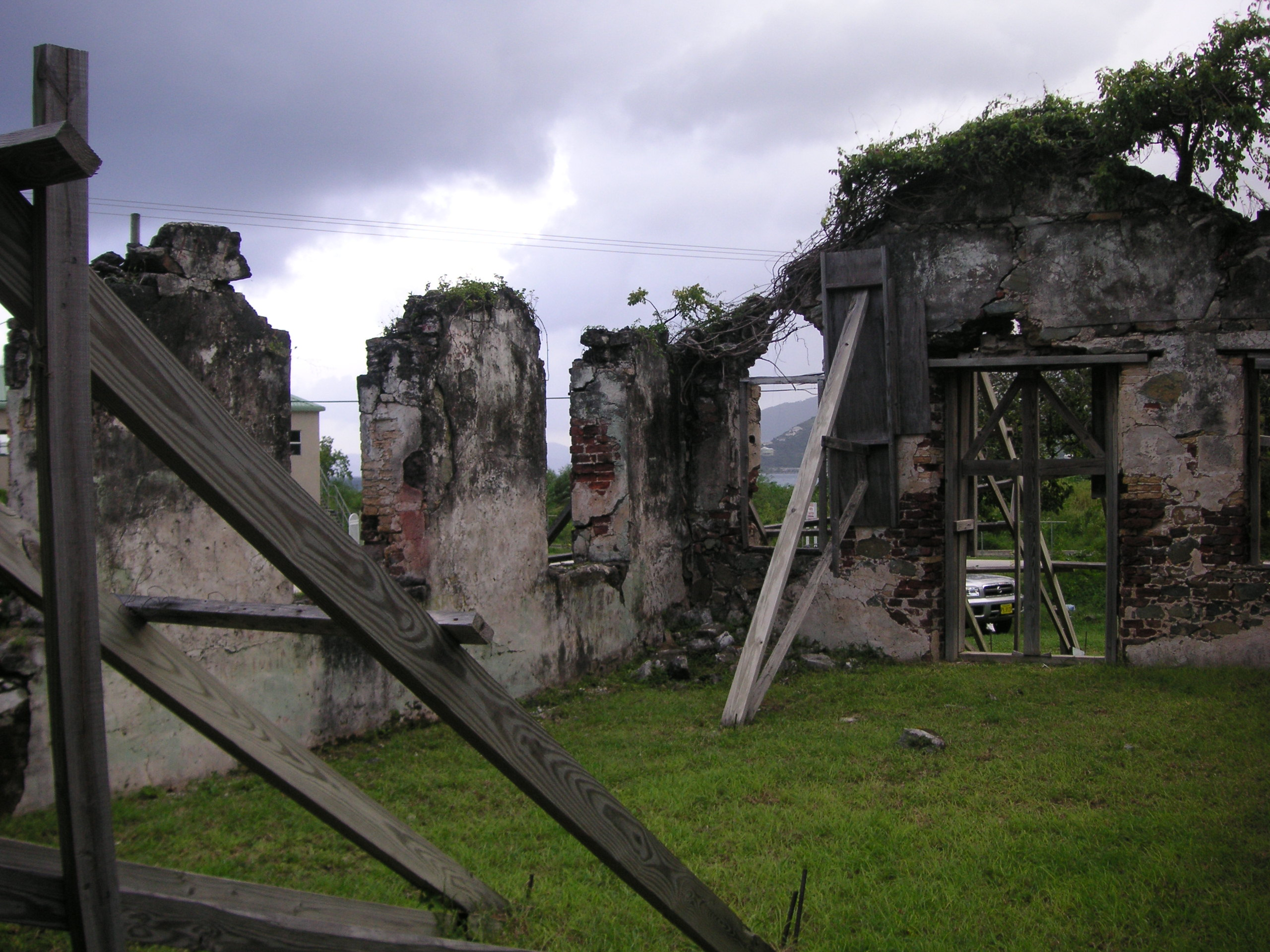
The view from inside of the ruins of St Phillip's Church

The church is in ruins and has not been in active use for decades. Occasional civil marriage ceremonies are conducted within its walls (technically as open air ceremonies). Graffiti has been daubed on some walls. The church is on private land but the landowner allows access to visitors for sightseeing. There have been discussions about the Government or the National Parks Trust purchasing the site, but this has not occurred.

A restoration project is underway to stabilize the remains for preservation, in order to feature the site in heritage tourism. It has unique historical status as a monument of abolition of the slave trade and the territory's religious heritage.

== See also ==
- History of the British Virgin Islands

== Sources ==
- Isaac Dookhan, History of the British Virgin Islands, ISBN 0-85935-027-4
- Vernon Pickering, A Concise History of the British Virgin Islands, ISBN 0-934139-05-9
