= Geology of the British Virgin Islands =

The geology of the British Virgin Islands is closely related to that of the Lesser Antilles and Greater Antilles volcanic island arcs. Inference from other neighboring islands suggests Cretaceous igneous and sedimentary basement rocks, overlain by Paleogene andesite and basalt. Folding and igneous intrusion took place in the Eocene and Oligocene. The islands are separated from the Lesser Antilles by a very deep channel formed by faulting in the Pliocene.
