= Military of the British Virgin Islands =

The defence of the British Virgin Islands is the responsibility of the United Kingdom. In the past the islands have had a regular British Army garrison and also raised their own militias by conscription and volunteer service. One resident, Samuel Hodge, won the Victoria Cross, Britain's highest gallantry award, for service in Gambia in the 19th century. No British forces are currently stationed in the territory but it receives occasional visits by the Royal Navy.

== History ==
The history of the islands is relatively free from armed conflict, and people of the British Virgin Islands have served in foreign militaries with great distinction. Foremost amongst these is Samuel Hodge (grandson of notorious historical figure, Arthur William Hodge), who won the Victoria Cross, Britain's highest military honour, whilst serving in the Gambia Campaign for the British Army.

The legislature of the British Virgin Islands established a militia in 1776. Black residents served on different terms to white militiamen. They were conscripted, served under white officers and received half the disability pension of white men of equivalent military rank. While the widows of white men killed in service received a pension, the widows of black men did not. Later a corps of infantry was raised on Tortola from free black men under white officers.

By 1853 this militia had ceased to exist and there were plans to withdraw the small British garrison of the 67th Regiment of Foot then on the island. The president of the Virgin Islands legislature, John Cornell Chads, objected to this and wrote to the governor of the Leeward Islands, Robert James Mackintosh, to express concern especially given a recent riot by black labourers. The legislature considered that the white population of Tortola could only muster a force of 12 fighting men and the coloured population only 24, with a rural black population of around 3,000. The British authorities relented and a small detachment of 20-30 men of the 2nd West India Regiment remained in garrison.

In 1859 a police force and a volunteer militia was established. A sum of £150 was allocated for establishing and arming the unit and £50 provided for its maintenance. In 1860 the Virgin Islands volunteer militia reported a strength of 100, mostly black men.

== Current situation ==
There are neither British Forces nor any military installations based on the islands. The Royal Navy may visit the islands from time to time during defence engagement in the region. In the aftermath of Hurricane Irma in 2017 Royal Navy and Royal Marines personnel helped to provide medical treatment and to restore the main prison to working order. Since 2020, the Royal Navy has generally deployed a River-class offshore patrol vessel in the Caribbean for general patrol duties and for sovereignty protection missions for all British territories in the region.

In October 2023, the destroyer HMS Dauntless (which had temporarily replaced the River-class patrol vessel HMS Medway on her Caribbean tasking), visited the territory in order to assist local authorities in preparing for the climax of the hurricane season. In August 2024, the offshore patrol vessel HMS Trent was deployed to the islands to provide assistance in the aftermath of Tropical Storm Ernesto.

== Virgin Islands Cadet Corps ==
The island has Army Cadet Corps since 2009, but they are not members of the British Army, but rather a youth organisation with ties to the Royal Virgin Islands Police Force and neighbouring Caribbean military and cadet organisations.
