= Membership of British Overseas Territories and Crown Dependencies in international organisations =

Territories under United Kingdom sovereignty

There are fourteen British Overseas Territories, and three Crown dependencies which are under the sovereignty of the United Kingdom but not part of the United Kingdom itself. Some of these territories have gained membership of international intergovernmental organisations and sports federations. Notably Anguilla, British Virgin Islands, Cayman Islands and Montserrat are associate members of UNESCO; Bermuda, British Virgin Islands and Cayman Islands are members of the International Olympic Committee; and Bermuda is a member of the International Paralympic Committee.

== Anguilla ==
Anguilla is a member of:

Intergovernmental organisations

- Caribbean Community (associate)
- Caribbean Development Bank
- Commonwealth Parliamentary Association
- Interpol (sub-bureau)
- Organisation of Eastern Caribbean States (associate)
- UNESCO (associate)
- UK–Overseas Territories Joint Ministerial Council
- United Kingdom Overseas Territories Association
- United Nations Economic Commission for Latin America and the Caribbean (associate)
- Universal Postal Union

International sports federations

- Commonwealth Games Federation
- FIFA (CONCACAF)
- World Athletics (NACAC)

== Bermuda ==
Bermuda is a member of:

Intergovernmental organisations

- Caribbean Community (associate)
- Commonwealth Parliamentary Association
- Interpol (sub-bureau)
- UK–Overseas Territories Joint Ministerial Council
- United Kingdom Overseas Territories Association
- United Nations Economic Commission for Latin America and the Caribbean (associate)
- Universal Postal Union
- World Customs Organization

International sports federations

- Commonwealth Games Federation
- FIFA (CONCACAF)
- International Cricket Council
- International Olympic Committee
- International Paralympic Committee
- World Athletics (NACAC)
- World Rugby

== British Indian Ocean Territory ==
The British Indian Ocean Territory is a member of:

Intergovernmental organisations

- Universal Postal Union

== British Virgin Islands ==
The British Virgin Islands are a member of:

Intergovernmental organisations

- Association of Caribbean States
- Caribbean Community (associate member)
- Caribbean Development Bank
- Interpol (sub-bureau)
- Organisation of Eastern Caribbean States
- UNESCO (associate member)
- UK–Overseas Territories Joint Ministerial Council
- United Kingdom Overseas Territories Association
- United Nations Economic Commission for Latin America and the Caribbean (associate)
- Universal Postal Union

International sports federations

- Commonwealth Games Federation
- FIFA (CONCACAF)
- International Olympic Committee
- World Athletics (NACAC)
- World Rugby (associate)

== Cayman Islands ==
The Cayman Islands are a member of:

Intergovernmental organisations

- Caribbean Community (associate)
- Caribbean Development Bank
- Commonwealth Parliamentary Association
- Interpol (sub-bureau)
- UNESCO (associate)
- UK–Overseas Territories Joint Ministerial Council
- United Kingdom Overseas Territories Association
- Universal Postal Union

International sports federations

- Commonwealth Games Federation
- International Cricket Council
- International Olympic Committee
- FIFA (CONCACAF)
- World Athletics (NACAC)
- World Rugby

== Falkland Islands ==
The Falkland Islands are a member of:

Intergovernmental organisations

- Commonwealth Parliamentary Association
- UK–Overseas Territories Joint Ministerial Council
- United Kingdom Overseas Territories Association
- Universal Postal Union

International sports federations

- Commonwealth Games Federation
- International Cricket Council

== Gibraltar ==
Gibraltar is a member of:

Intergovernmental organisations

- Commonwealth Foundation
- Commonwealth Parliamentary Association
- Interpol (sub-bureau)
- UK–Overseas Territories Joint Ministerial Council
- United Kingdom Overseas Territories Association
- Universal Postal Union

International sports federations

- Commonwealth Games Federation
- FIFA (UEFA)
- International Basketball Federation
- International Cricket Council
- World Athletics (European Athletic Association)
- World Darts Federation

== Guernsey ==
Guernsey is a member of:

Intergovernmental organisations

- British-Irish Council
- British–Irish Parliamentary Assembly
- Commonwealth Parliamentary Association

International sports federations

- Commonwealth Games Federation
- World Bowls

== Isle of Man ==
The Isle of Man is a member of:

Intergovernmental organisations

- British-Irish Council
- British–Irish Parliamentary Assembly
- Commonwealth Parliamentary Association

International sports federations

- Commonwealth Games Federation

== Jersey ==
Jersey is a member of:

Intergovernmental organisations

- British-Irish Council
- British–Irish Parliamentary Assembly
- Commonwealth Parliamentary Association

International sports federations

- Commonwealth Games Federation
- World Bowls

== Montserrat ==
Montserrat is a member of:

Intergovernmental organisations

- Caribbean Community
- Caribbean Development Bank
- Commonwealth Parliamentary Association
- Interpol (sub-bureau)
- Organization of Eastern Caribbean States
- UNESCO (associate)
- UK–Overseas Territories Joint Ministerial Council
- United Kingdom Overseas Territories Association
- United Nations Economic Commission for Latin America and the Caribbean (associate)
- Universal Postal Union

International sports federations

- Commonwealth Games Federation
- FIFA (CONCACAF)
- World Athletics (NACAC)

== Pitcairn Islands ==
The Pitcairn Islands are a member of:

Intergovernmental organisations

- Pacific Community
- UK–Overseas Territories Joint Ministerial Council
- United Kingdom Overseas Territories Association
- Universal Postal Union

== Saint Helena, Ascension and Tristan da Cunha ==
Saint Helena, Ascension and Tristan da Cunha is a member of:

Intergovernmental organisations

- Commonwealth Parliamentary Association
- UK–Overseas Territories Joint Ministerial Council
- United Kingdom Overseas Territories Association
- Universal Postal Union

International sports federations

- Commonwealth Games Federation
- International Cricket Council

== South Georgia and South Sandwich Islands ==
The South Georgia and South Sandwich Islands are a member of:

Intergovernmental organisations

- Universal Postal Union

== Sovereign Base Areas of Akrotiri and Dhekelia ==
The Sovereign Base Areas of Akrotiri and Dhekelia are a member of:

Intergovernmental organisations

- UK–Overseas Territories Joint Ministerial Council

== Turks and Caicos Islands ==
The Turks and Caicos Islands are a member of:

Intergovernmental organisations

- Caribbean Community (associate)
- Caribbean Development Bank
- Commonwealth Parliamentary Association
- Interpol (sub-bureau)
- UK–Overseas Territories Joint Ministerial Council
- United Kingdom Overseas Territories Association
- United Nations Economic Commission for Latin America and the Caribbean (associate)
- Universal Postal Union

International sports federations

- Commonwealth Games Federation
- FIFA (CONCACAF)
- International Cricket Council
- Rugby Americas North
- World Athletics (NACAC)
- World Darts Federation

== See also ==
- Membership of the countries of the United Kingdom in international organisations
