= Education in the British Virgin Islands =

Education in the British Virgin Islands is largely free and is a requirement for children ages 5 to 17. The British Virgin Islands has a total of 15 public primary schools and 4 secondary public schools. In addition to the public schools, there are 10 primary private schools and 3 secondary private schools. The school year is from September to June. The British Virgin Islands is a part of the British Overseas Territories and therefore the educational system is very similar to the traditional learning system in the United Kingdom. Primary schools are focused on establishing the basics of an academic curriculum and host students between the ages of 5 and 12. After the completion of primary school (seven years), students move on to secondary school (five years) and pre-university (two years). Secondary school is for students between the ages of 13 and 17. Following the completion of secondary education, students may write their Caribbean Secondary Education Certificate. There are approximately 2,700 students who attend primary school for the first 7 years of their required education; however less than 1,800 students successfully finish the following 4 required years of secondary school and complete their certificate exam. Students who chose to continue their education after the secondary education certificate may move on to an additional 2 years of schooling (Caribbean Advanced Proficiency Examinations). Passing the exams entitles students the right to continue their studies even further at the University of the Virgin Islands. At the university, students can obtain associate, bachelors, and master's degrees in the departments of business, education, liberal arts and social sciences, or science and mathematic.

== Becoming enrolled ==
Students have the opportunity to apply to any school of their choice due to the lack of zoning. A student must apply for placement for both private and public institutions through the Department of Education. Applications are accepted between January and April for the following school year. Many documents must be submitted along with an application.

Documents Needed for Enrollment:

- child's birth certificate
- updated immunization form
- passport photo
- letter of good health
- transcripts from previous institutions (if applicable)
- parent's passport
- parent's work permit OR government appointment letter
- if attending a private school, an acceptance letter

Once documents are accepted and reviewed, prospective students may be asked to take a placement exam.

== Homeschooling ==
Parents of student are required to submit an application to the Department of Education to achieve the right to homeschool their child. Students are still required to take and pass examinations. Curriculums for homeschooled children may be just as if not more demanding than the curriculums and educational institutions.

== ICT Policies ==
The Department of Education in the British Virgin Islands is improving schools greatly by resolving maintenance issues and increasing access along with use of ICT in both public primary and secondary schools. Teachers are expected to gain ICT skills in college and university education. The DOE requires that all Public primary schools have at least 1 lab room consisting of at least 10 computers per lab. In addition, each school must have an ADSL Internet connection.

== Educational institutions ==
Tertiary:

- H. Lavity Stoutt Community College

=== Primary and secondary schools ===
==== Public schools ====
Primary and secondary schools

- Claudia Creque Educational Centre (formerly Anegada Primary and Secondary School) - Anegada
- Bregado Flax Educational Centre - Virgin Gorda

High schools

- Elmore Stoutt High School (formerly BVI High School) - Tortola
- The Virgin Islands School of Technical Studies - [Tortola]

Primary schools

- Enis Adams Primary School
- Belle Vue (Joyce Samuel) Primary School
- Ivan Dawson Primary School
- Leonora Delville Primary School
- Francis Lettsome Primary School
- Alexandrina Maduro Primary School
- Isabella Morris Primary School
- Robinson O'Neal Memorial Primary School
- Althea Scatliffe Primary School
- Ebenezer Thomas Primary School
- Jost Van Dyke Primary School
- Willard Wheatley Primary School

Pre-primary schools

- Enid Scatliffe Pre-Primary School

Other

- Eslyn Richiez Learning Centre
- Pre-Vocational Centre

==== Private schools ====
Private schools include:

- BVI Seventh Day Adventist School
- Cedar School
- Century House Montessori School
- Cornerstone School
- Imagination Academy VI
- St. George's School
- Valley Day School
- Agape Total Life Academy
