= Demographics of the British Virgin Islands =

This is a demography of the population of the British Virgin Islands including population density, ethnicity, education level, health of the populace, economic status, religious affiliations and various other aspects.

Census population and average annual growth rate
Year	Pop.	±% p.a.
1901	4,908	—
1911	5,562	+1.26%
1921	5,082	−0.90%
1946	6,505	+0.99%
1960	7,921	+1.42%
1970	9,672	+2.02%
1980	10,985	+1.28%
1991	16,116	+3.55%
2001	23,161	+3.69%
2010	28,054	+2.15%

== Population ==
A July 2009 estimate placed the population of the British Virgin Islands at 24,491. In 2003, 21.9% of the population was under 15 (male 2,401; female 2,358), 73.1% between 15 and 64 (male 8,181; female 7,709), and 5% over 64 (male 578; female 503). 40% of the total population lived in urban areas, with an estimated 1.7% annual rate of urbanization. In 2014, the average woman produced 1.25 children. The estimated population of 2021 is 31,122 (the 2022 revision of the World Population Prospects).

=== Structure of the population ===
Population by Sex and Age Group (Census 12.VII.2010):

Age group	Male	Female	Total	%
Total	13 820	14 234	28 054	100
0–4	1 126	1 008	2 134	7.61
5–9	1 065	1 025	2 090	7.45
10–14	1 032	1 012	2 044	7.29
15–19	867	900	1 767	6.30
20–24	789	931	1 720	6.13
25–29	1 126	1 190	2 316	8.26
30–34	1 165	1 372	2 537	9.04
35–39	1 226	1 373	2 599	9.26
40–44	1 236	1 323	2 559	9.12
45–49	1 193	1 145	2 338	8.33
50–54	962	880	1 842	6.57
55–59	680	707	1 387	4.94
60–64	541	487	1 028	3.66
65–69	350	320	670	2.39
70–74	204	211	415	1.48
75–79	98	132	230	0.82
80–84	91	125	216	0.77
85–89	39	45	84	0.30
90+	30	48	78	0.28
Age group	Male	Female	Total	Per cent
0–14	3 223	3 045	6 268	22.34
15–64	9 785	10 308	20 093	71.62
65+	812	881	1 693	6.03

== Vital statistics ==
Population, fertility rate and net reproduction rate, United Nations estimates

	Average population (x 1000)	Live births	Deaths	Natural change	Crude birth rate (per 1000)	Crude death rate (per 1000)	Natural change (per 1000)	TFR
1950	7	227	68	159	30.5	9.1	21.4	
1951	8	282	84	198	37.6	11.2	26.4	
1952	8	311	70	241	41.1	9.3	31.9	
1953	8	318	84	234	41.8	11.0	30.8	
1954	8	305	85	220	39.9	11.1	28.8	
1955	8	292	74	218	38.0	9.6	28.4	
1956	8	317	87	230	41.0	11.3	29.8	
1957	8	319	106	213	41.0	13.6	27.4	
1958	8	315	93	222	40.1	11.8	28.3	
1959	8	306	84	222	38.6	10.6	28.0	
1960	8	279	67	212	34.7	8.3	26.4	
1961	8	257	79	178	31.5	9.7	21.8	
1962	8	277	70	207	33.4	8.4	24.9	
1963	8	264	67	197	31.2	7.9	23.3	
1964	9	225	75	150	26.1	8.7	17.4	
1965	9							
1966	9							
1967	9	225	70	155	24.4	7.6	16.8	
1968	9	288	63	225	30.6	6.7	23.9	
1969	10	238	74	164	24.7	7.7	17.0	
1970	10	313	67	246	31.9	6.8	25.1	
1971	10	297	66	231	29.8	6.6	23.2	
1972	10	307	67	240	30.3	6.6	23.7	
1973	10	252	71	181	24.6	6.9	17.6	
1974	10	247	79	168	23.8	7.6	16.2	
1975	10	221	65	156	21.1	6.2	14.9	
1976	11	243	62	181	23.0	5.9	17.2	
1977	11	206	62	144	19.4	5.9	13.6	
1978	11	203	65	138	19.0	6.1	12.9	
1979	11	216	63	153	20.0	5.8	14.2	
1980	11	272	69	203	24.7	6.3	18.4	
1981	11	231	53	178	20.4	4.7	15.7	
1982	12	235	67	168	20.1	5.7	14.3	
1983	12	281	61	220	23.0	5.0	18.0	
1984	13	225	66	159	17.7	5.2	12.5	
1985	13	241	65	176	18.1	4.9	13.2	
1986	14	213	82	131	15.3	5.9	9.4	
1987	15	263	83	180	18.0	5.7	12.3	
1988	15	237	59	178	15.5	3.9	11.7	
1989	16	244	77	167	15.3	4.8	10.5	
1990	16							
1991	17	303	77	226	17.9	4.5	13.3	
1992	17	290	90	200	16.7	5.2	11.5	
1993	18	318	76	242	18.0	4.3	13.7	
1994	18	298	105	193	16.5	5.8	10.7	
1995	18	287	90	197	15.6	4.9	10.7	
1996	19	287	88	199	15.2	4.7	10.6	
1997	19	350	97	253	18.2	5.0	13.1	
1998	20	278	87	191	14.1	4.4	9.7	
1999	20	315	94	221	15.6	4.7	10.9	
2000	21	325	91	234	15.7	4.4	11.3	
2001	21	314	101	213	14.9	4.8	10.1	
2002	22	253	97	156	11.8	4.5	7.2	
2003	22	269	104	165	12.2	4.7	7.5	
2004	23	316	120	196	14.0	5.3	8.7	
2005	25.422	285	106	179	10.9	4.1	6.8	1.3
2006	26.108	264	79	185	9.8	3.0	6.8	1.2
2007	27.007	283	104	179	10.1	3.8	6.4	1.3
2008	28.084	313	100	213	10.9	3.54	7.36	1.45
2009	28.020	323	109	214	11.2	3.77	7.43	1.5
2010	28.037	303	104	199	10.1	3.52	6.58	1.17
2011	28.103	333	98	235	11.8	3.49	8.31	1.29
2012	30.254	286	122	164	9.5	4.0	5.4	1.09
2013	31.516	277	113	114	8.8	3.6	3.6	1.07
2014	33.054	282	111	171	8.5	3.4	5.2	1.07
2015	34.064	266	136	130	7.8	4.0	3.8	0.98
2016	36.092	269	120	149	7.5	3.3	4.1	0.98
2017	32.800	245	155	90	7.5	4.7	2.7	0.86
2018	33.789	252	115	137	7.5	3.4	4.1	
2019	36.009	272	108	164	7.6	3.0	4.6	
2020	36.521	325	154	171	8.9	4.2	4.7	
2021	37.408	272	171	101	7.3	4.6	2.7	

In 2009, the infant mortality rate in the British Virgin Islands was 14.65/1000 births (16.61/1000 for females and 12.58/1000 for males). Life expectancy at birth was 77.26 years: 76.03 years for males and 78.55 years for females.

== Ethnicity ==
=== Historical ===
Year	% W	% B
1678	87.9	12.1
1717	46.5	53.5
1720	42.5	57.4
1756	16.2	83.8

=== Current ===
Ethnic groups of the British Virgin Islands (2010)
Ethnic groups	per cent
Black	76.3%
Hispanic	5.5%
White	5.4%
Mixed	5.3%
East Indian	2.1%
Other	4.6%
Unspecified	0.8%

== Religion ==
Religions of the British Virgin Islands
Religions	per cent
Protestant	58.78%
Other Christian	22.98%
Catholic	2.81%
Non-religious	6.85%
Indigenous Religion	8.39%
Other Religions	2.4%
Hindu	1.19%
Muslims	1.15%
