= Royal Virgin Islands Police Force =

National police force of the British Virgin Islands

- Flag of the British Virgin Islands
- Abbreviation: RVIPF
- Motto: Service with courage, knowledge and integrity

Agency overview
- Formed: 1967

Jurisdictional structure
- Operations jurisdiction: British Virgin Islands, British Overseas Territories
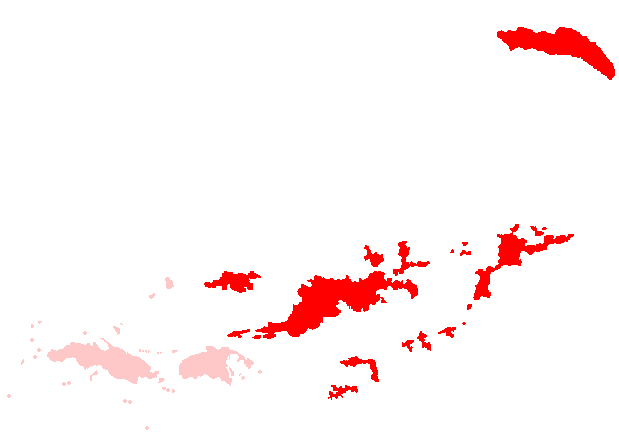
- Map of Royal Virgin Islands Police Force's jurisdiction
- Area: 153 km²
- Population: Approx 22,000
- Legal jurisdiction: British Virgin Islands
- General nature: Local civilian police

Operational structure
- Headquarters: Road Town
- Constables: 253
- Agency executive: Mark Collins QPM, Commissioner

Facilities
- Stations: 11

Website
- Official Website

The Royal Virgin Islands Police Force is the territorial police force of the British Virgin Islands.

== History ==
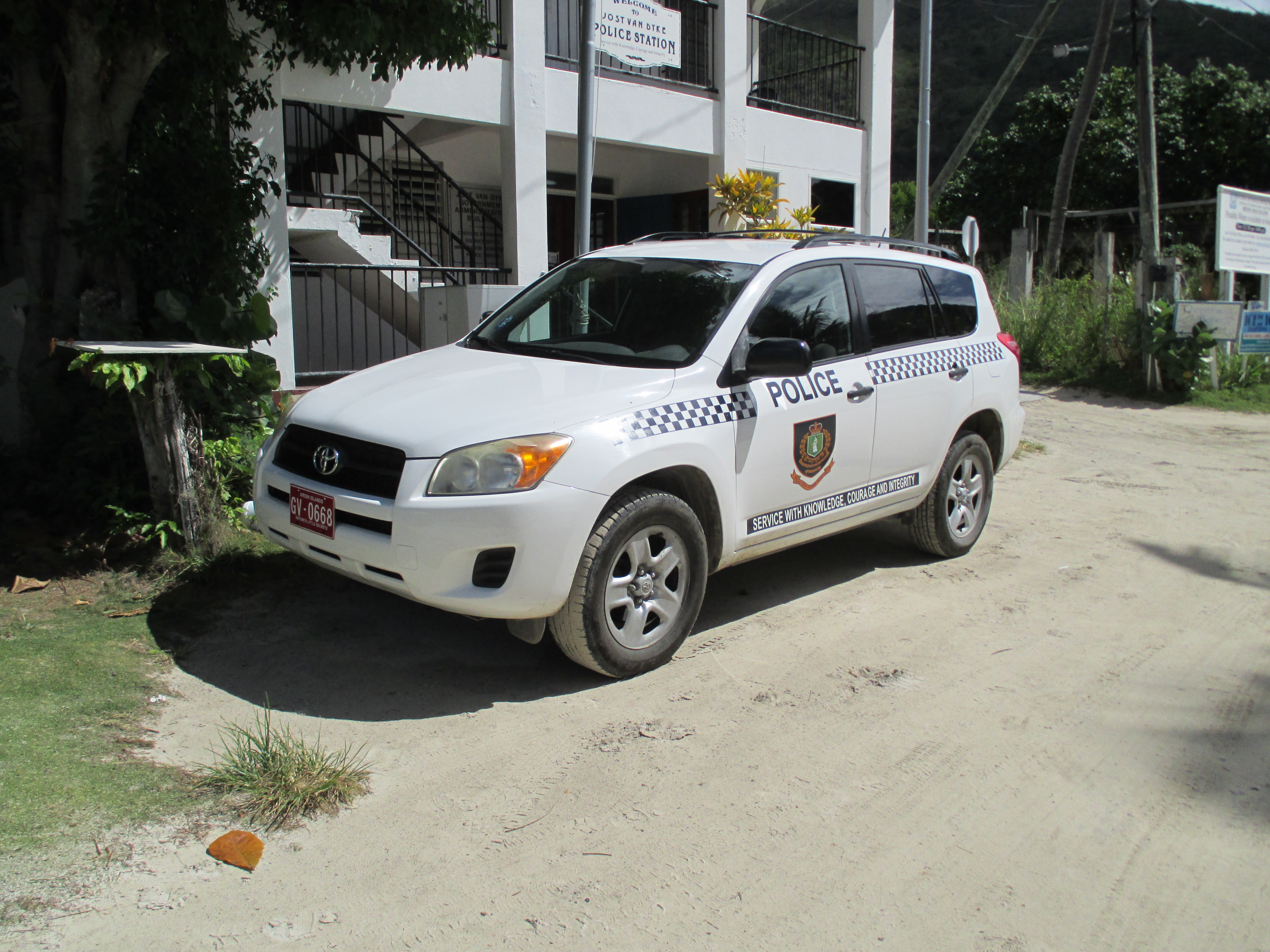
Police vehicle

The RVIP was formed in 1967. Previously the British Leeward Islands Police had provided policing across all British territories in the region, from the late nineteenth century onwards. Following the granting of independence to certain constituent states, and the change in status of dependent territories, the larger force was gradually broken down into smaller constabularies. The British Virgin Islands were briefly, during the 1960s, policed by the Antigua, Montserrat and Virgin Islands Police Force, but this force was dissolved in 1967, with each constituent state gaining an independent force.

== Structure ==
The force is headed by a Commissioner of Police, and is divided into three operational divisions:

- Community Policing
- Specialist Operations – includes CID and Marine Unit
- Management Services

The Specialist Operations division includes a Criminal Investigation Department and a marine unit which operates several small fast boats, and the large police patrol boat "St Ursula".

The force's financial investigations department is headed by an officer of Chief Inspector rank paid for by the Foreign and Commonwealth Office.

=== Officers ===
The force employs a total of nearly 300 people, of whom around 240 are dedicated police officers or auxiliary constables (see below).

=== Police stations ===
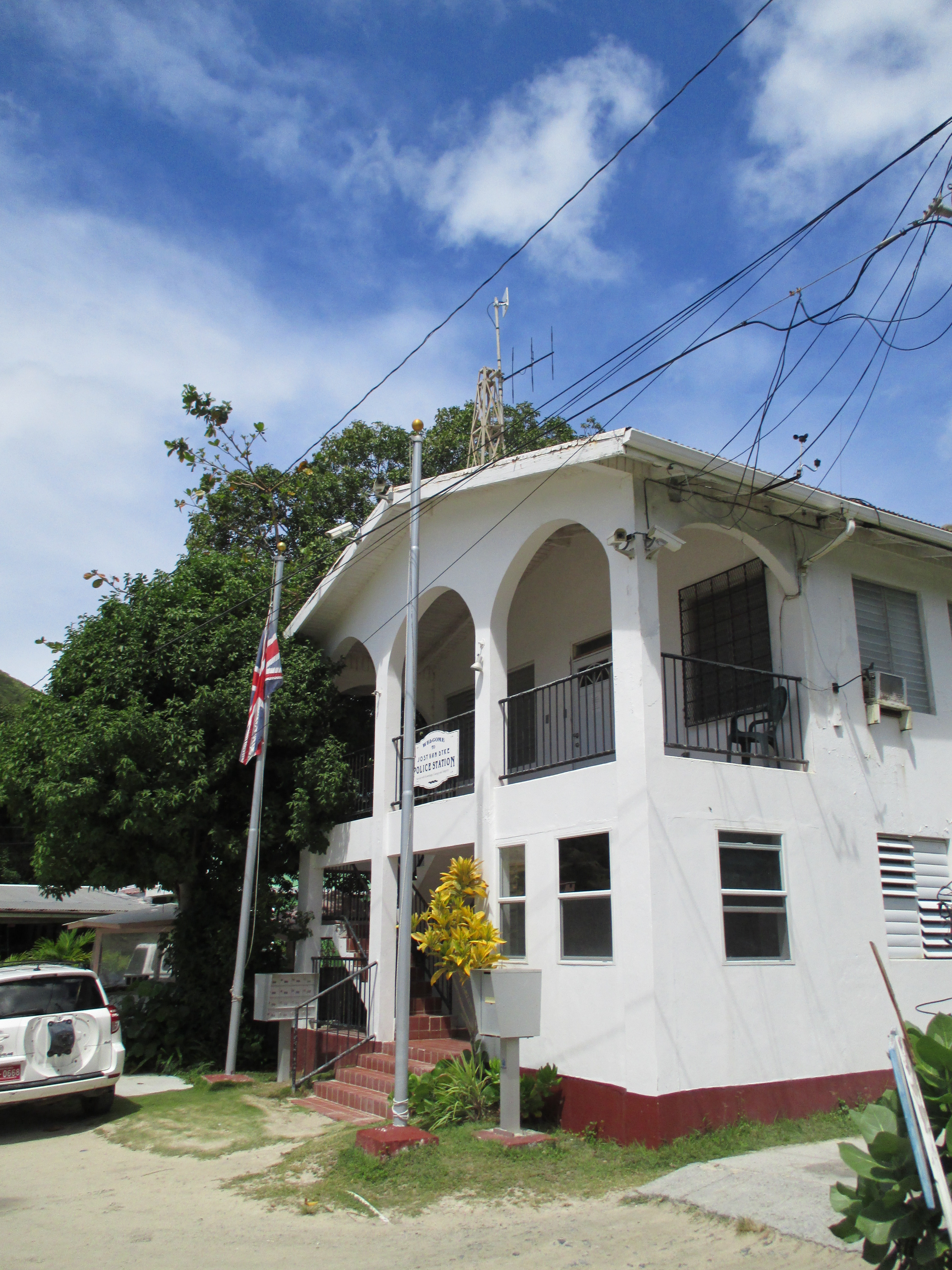
Jost van Dyke (island) Police Station

There are eleven police stations, consisting of eight regular territorial stations (four on Tortola, two on Virgin Gorda, one on Anegada, and one on Jost Van Dyke), together with three specialist stations on the main island of Tortola, namely the Force Headquarters station (incorporating the Office of the Commissioner), the airport police station, and the Marine Base police station.

=== Rank structure ===
The rank structure of the RVIPF is as follows:

RVIPF Rank Structure
| Rank | Commissioner | Deputy Commissioner | Superintendent | Chief inspector | Inspector | Station Sergeant | Sergeant | Constable |
| Epaulette insignia | | | | | | | | |

== Commissioner ==
The RVIP is headed by a Commissioner, assisted by a Deputy Commissioner. In April 2013 the Government advertised a vacancy for the post of Commissioner. There was speculation that the appointment was a foregone conclusion and that the Deputy Commissioner (and then Acting Commissioner) David Morris would be appointed.

In July 2013 the Governor announced that David Morris had been appointed as Commissioner with effect from September 2013. The appointment has caused some controversy, as there are on-going formal complaints against the new Commissioner in which unfair dismissals and abuse of authority are alleged.

In April 2021, a new Commissioner from the United Kingdom was appointed, Mr Mark Collins QPM.

== Special constables ==
The Royal Virgin Islands Police employs numbers of special constables. These officers have the same training, powers, and duties as regular constables, but work on a part-time basis whilst also maintaining another (primary) career. Their policing duties are carried out during their own free time. This is similar to the United Kingdom's Special Constabulary.

== Auxiliary constables ==
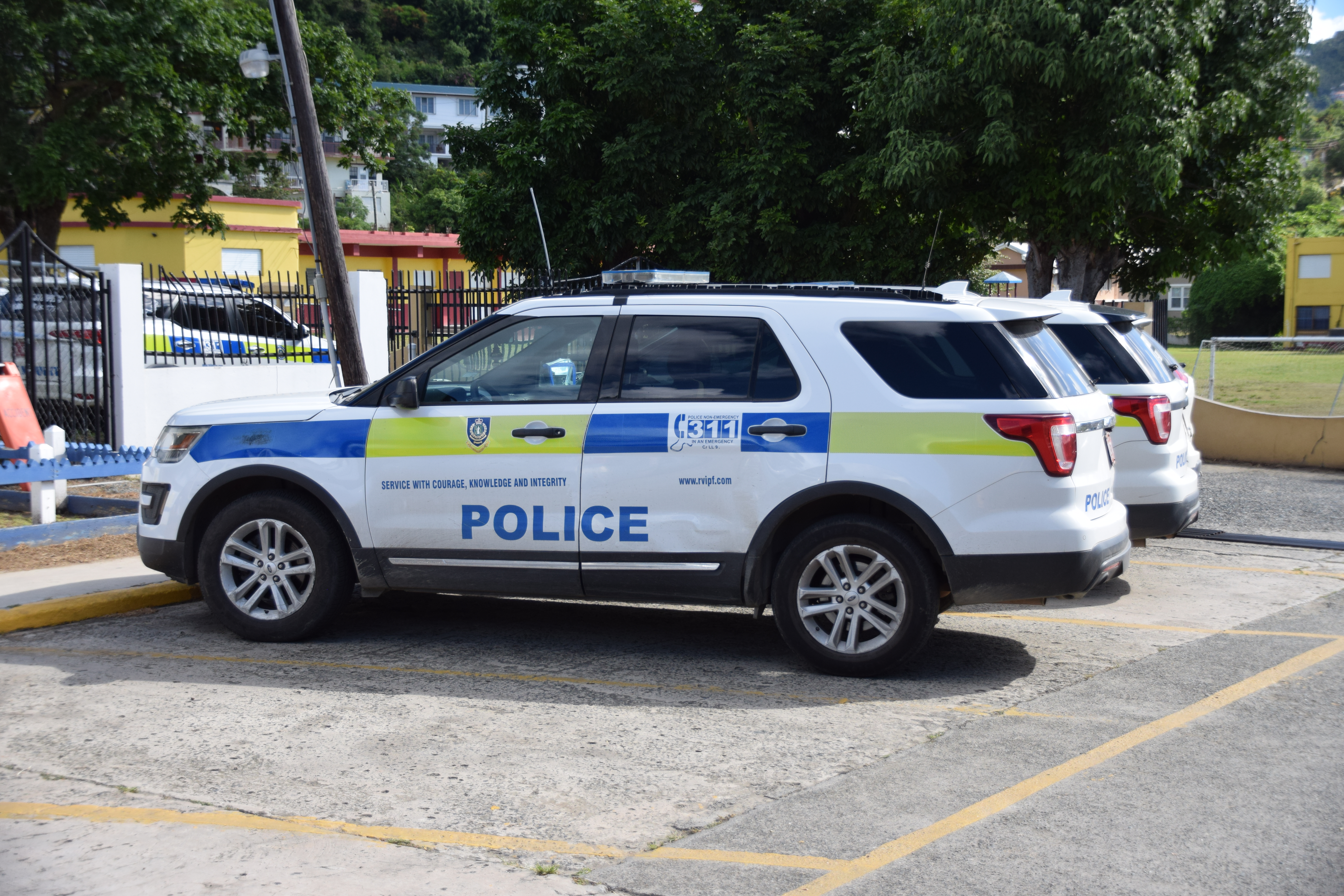
Ford Police Utility police car on British Virgin Islands

In the early days of the Leeward Islands Police, only a very small detachment of regular police officers was based on Tortola. They were supported by locally recruited and trained "Local Constables", who had limited authority, but maintained law and order. This tradition has continued to the present day, and the RVIP still includes around 20 "auxiliary constables", who have limited training, and are employed in supervising school crossings, and carrying out simple traffic control duties. They perform some station administrative duties, and sometimes investigate minor offences.

In many ways they are similar to British Police community support officers, but unlike PCSOs, a Virgin Islands auxiliary constable has full police powers of arrest and detention.

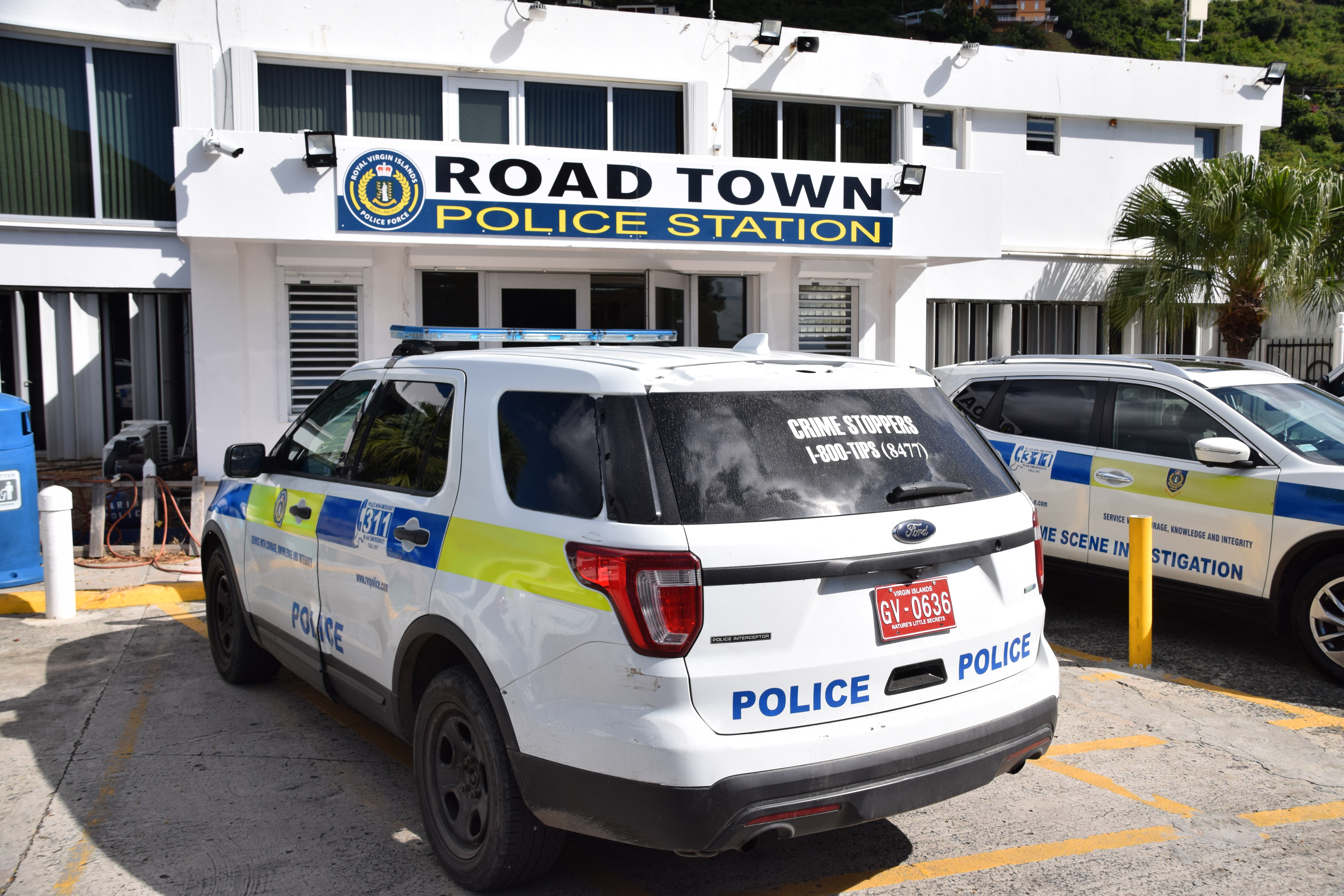
Road Town Police Station and a Ford Police Interceptor Utility of the RVIPF
