= Government of the British Virgin Islands =

His Majesty's Government of the Virgin Islands (usually simply referred to as the Government of the Virgin Islands) is the democratically elected government of the British Overseas Territory of the British Virgin Islands. It is regulated by the Constitution of the British Virgin Islands.

The Government is led by the Premier, who selects all the remaining Ministers of Government. The Premier and the other Ministers belong to the supreme decision-making committee, known as the Cabinet. The Government Ministers are all members of House of Assembly, and are accountable to it. The Government is dependent upon the House to make primary legislation. King Charles III (represented by a Governor of the British Virgin Islands) is the head of state. The monarch (acting through the Governor) selects as Premier the leader of the political party most likely to command a majority in the House of Assembly.

Elections in the British Virgin Islands are held approximately every four years, with a unicameral House of Assembly of 13 members (11 members elected by popular vote, plus the Speaker appointed by the House and the Attorney General).

The current Premier is Natalio Wheatley who is a member of the ruling Virgin Islands Party, and the current Governor is John Rankin.

== Executive government ==
Although ultimate executive authority rests with the British monarch exercising his powers through the Governor, the Territory is internally self-governing, and in practice Ministerial Government is exercised on a day-to-day basis by the Premier through Cabinet (although the Governor also sits in Cabinet). The British Virgin Islands operates under the Westminster system, and the Ministers and Cabinet are appointed from among the members of the Legislature and are not independently elected to executive office.

The principal Ministries of Government are:

- Minister of Finance and Tourism (presently the Premier, Andrew Fahie)
- Minister for Natural Resources, Labour & Immigration (presently the Deputy Premier, Vincent Wheatley)
- Minister for Education, Culture, Agriculture, Fisheries, Sports & Youth Affairs (presently Hon. Natalio Wheatley)
- Minister for Transportation, Works & Utilities (presently Hon. Kye Rymer)
- Minister for Health and Social Development (presently Hon. Carvin Malone)

=== External relations ===
As a British Overseas Territory, the majority of the external relationships of the British Virgin Islands Government are conducted on its behalf by the United Kingdom through the Foreign and Commonwealth Office. However the Constitution provides that this power is delegated to Premier and Ministers of Government in relation to certain specific areas:

1. the Caribbean Community, the Organisation of Eastern Caribbean States, the Association of Caribbean States, the United Nations Economic Commission for Latin America and the Caribbean, or any other Caribbean regional organisation or institution;
2. other Caribbean regional affairs relating specifically to issues that are of interest to or affect the British Virgin Islands;
3. the relationship between the British Virgin Islands and the United States Virgin Islands in matters of mutual interest;
4. tourism and tourism-related matters;
5. taxation and the regulation of finance and financial services; and
6. European Union matters directly affecting the interests of the Territory.

However, there are a number of restrictions imposed by the Constitution upon the exercise by Ministers of that delegated power, including the need for separate authority from the Secretary of State to conclude any treaty or other international agreement, and the requirement to keep the Governor "fully informed" of relevant activities and to provide on request all papers and information relating to such matters.

In turn the British Government has indicated in a letter of entrustment that will consult fully with the British Virgin Islands in relation to matters which are reserved to the United Kingdom Government, including defence, internal security and civil aviation.

=== Public finances ===
Public finances are administered through the Ministry of Finance. In the British Virgin Islands it is common for the Premier to also be the Minister for Finance. Public finance is regulation by the Public Finance Management Act, 2004.

On 23 April 2012 the Government of the British Virgin Islands signed protocols for effective financial management with the Governor and the British Minister for the Overseas Territories. The protocols contain a number of wide-ranging provisions agreeing on certain parameters for financial and risk management, making commitments to financial transparency, and includes various limitations on the Government of the British Virgin Islands in relation to borrowing.

The protocols provide that all capital projects undertaken by the Government shall comply with applicable protocols for: (i) appraisal of business case and cost-benefit analysis, (ii) transparency for tendering and procurement, (iii) contract management, and (iv) evaluation process.

The protocols also include certain hard limits in relation to Governmental borrowing. Under the protocols:

1. outstanding public debt must remain less than 80% of recurrent revenue;
2. debt service (i.e. interest payments) must remain less than 10% of recurrent revenue; and
3. liquid assets must be retained in an amount of not less than 25% of recurrent expenditure.

As at 2014 public debt in the British Virgin Islands is approximately US$111 million, which is approximately 36.6% of recurrent revenues. In recent years problems have arisen because of repeated unbudgeted expenditure by Ministerial departments; the problem became sufficiently acute that in 2016 the Territory's Financial Secretary wrote an open letter to all Ministers warning them against such practices.

== Legislature ==
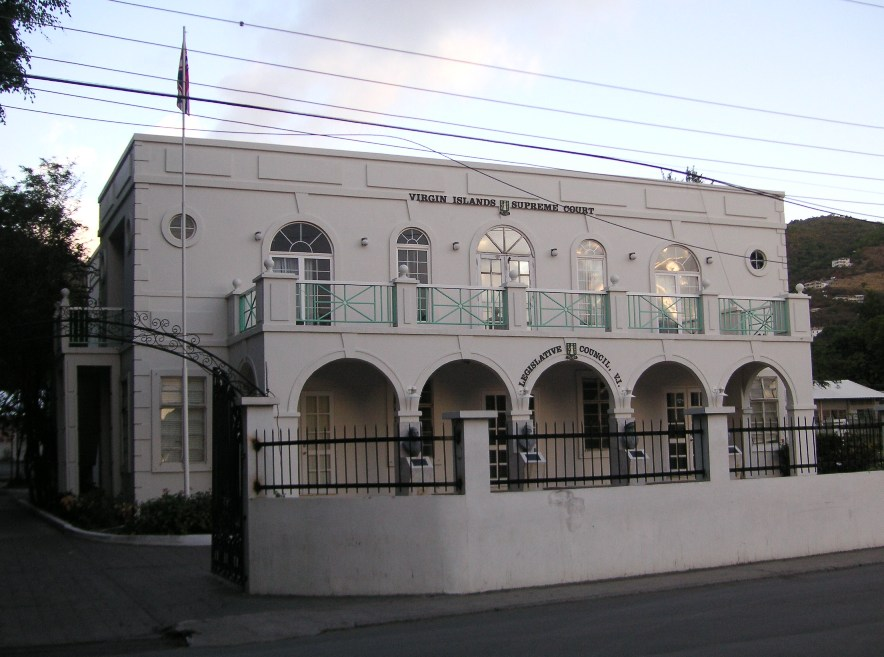
The House of Assembly.

The British Virgin Islands legislature is the House of Assembly. Prior to the adoption of the new constitution in 2007 the legislature was called the Legislative Council. General elections are conducted every four years (unless the House is dissolved earlier, either as a result of a vote of no confidence or otherwise).

The House consists of 11 elected two members, and two appointed ex-officio non-voting members (the Speaker and the Attorney General). The 11 elected members consist of 9 candidates who are elected to represent Territorial districts, and 4 candidates who are elected on a Territory-wide basis. Government is formed by the leader of the party who can most readily command a majority in the House. Although in recent times parties have tended to win absolute majorities, during the early days of democratic elections in the British Virgin Islands, coalition governments were commonly formed between parties and independent candidates. Politicians in the British Virgin Islands also frequently cross the floor to change parties to create absolute majorities.

== Judiciary ==
The judiciary of British Virgin Islands is based on the judiciary of the United Kingdom. The Territory is a member state of the Eastern Caribbean Supreme Court. Judges in the British Virgin Islands are appointed by the Judicial and Legal Services Commission of the Supreme Court rather than elected. By convention judges are always appointed to sit outside of the member state where they are originally from.

The courts are organised at four levels, including the provision for final appeal to the Judicial Committee of the Privy Council in London. The four levels of courts are:

- Magistrates Court (dealing with summary criminal matters and minor civil matters)
- High Court (dealing with criminal trials on indictment and with unlimited jurisdiction in civil matters)
- Court of Appeal
- Privy Council

The British Virgin Islands is a common law jurisdiction, although British Virgin Islands law and procedure differs to a great degree from English law because of local statutes, orders and civil procedure rules. However, in certain instances British Virgin Islands law provides that in default of any local provision, English law or procedure shall apply.
