= Transport in the British Virgin Islands =

The systems of transport in the British Virgin Islands include 113 kilometres of highway and a harbour at Road Town.

== Roads ==
- total: 200 km
- paved: 200 km
- unpaved: 0 km (2007)

Despite using left-hand traffic, most vehicles are left-hand-drive, being imported from the United States.

== Ports and terminals ==
- Road Town

== Airports ==
- 4 (2008)

=== Paved runways ===
- total: 2
  - 914 to 1,523 m: 1
  - under 914 m: 1 (2008)

=== Unpaved runways ===
- total: 2
  - 914 to 1,523 m: 2 (2008)

== Merchant Marine ==
- registered in other countries: 1 (Panama) (2008)
