= Geography of the British Virgin Islands =

Coordinates: 18°30′N 64°30′W

British Virgin Islands
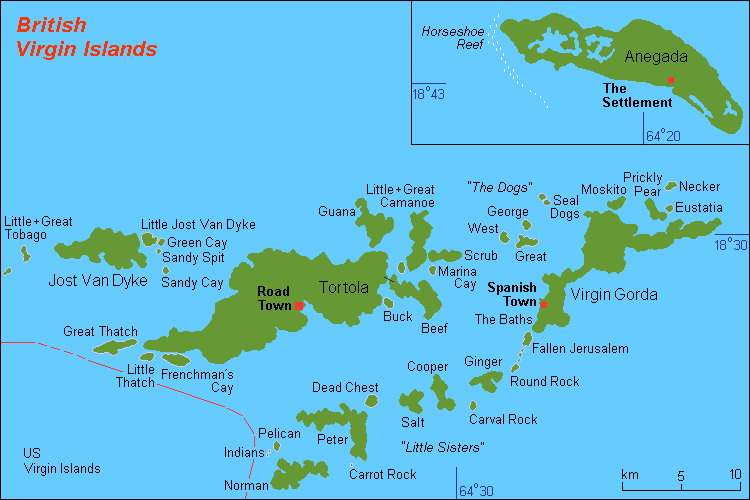
- Map of British Virgin Islands
- Interactive map of British Virgin Islands

Geography
- Location: Caribbean Sea, Atlantic Ocean
- Archipelago: Leeward Islands
- Area: 151 km^{2} (58 sq mi)
- Coastline: 80 km (50 mi)
- Highest point: Mount Sage 521m

Administration
- United Kingdom
- Overseas territory: British Virgin Islands

Demographics
- Population: 37,891 (July 2021)

The British Virgin Islands (BVI) are one of three political divisions of the Virgin Islands archipelago located in the Lesser Antilles, between the Caribbean Sea and the North Atlantic Ocean. The BVI are the easternmost part of the island chain. The land area totals (151 km^{2} (58 sq mi)) (about 0.9 times the size of Washington, DC) and comprises 16 inhabited and more than 20 uninhabited islands. The islands of Tortola (54 km^{2} (21 sq mi)), Anegada (36 km^{2} (14 sq mi)), Virgin Gorda (21 km^{2} (8 sq mi)) and Jost van Dyke (10 km^{2} (4 sq mi)) are the largest. Maritime claims include 12 nmi (22.2 km; 13.8 mi) territorial sea and a 200 nmi (370.4 km; 230.2 mi) exclusive fishing zone. In terms of land use, it is 20% arable land, 6.67% permanent crops and 73.33% other as of a 2005 figure. It has strong ties to nearby US Virgin Islands and Puerto Rico.

== Terrain ==
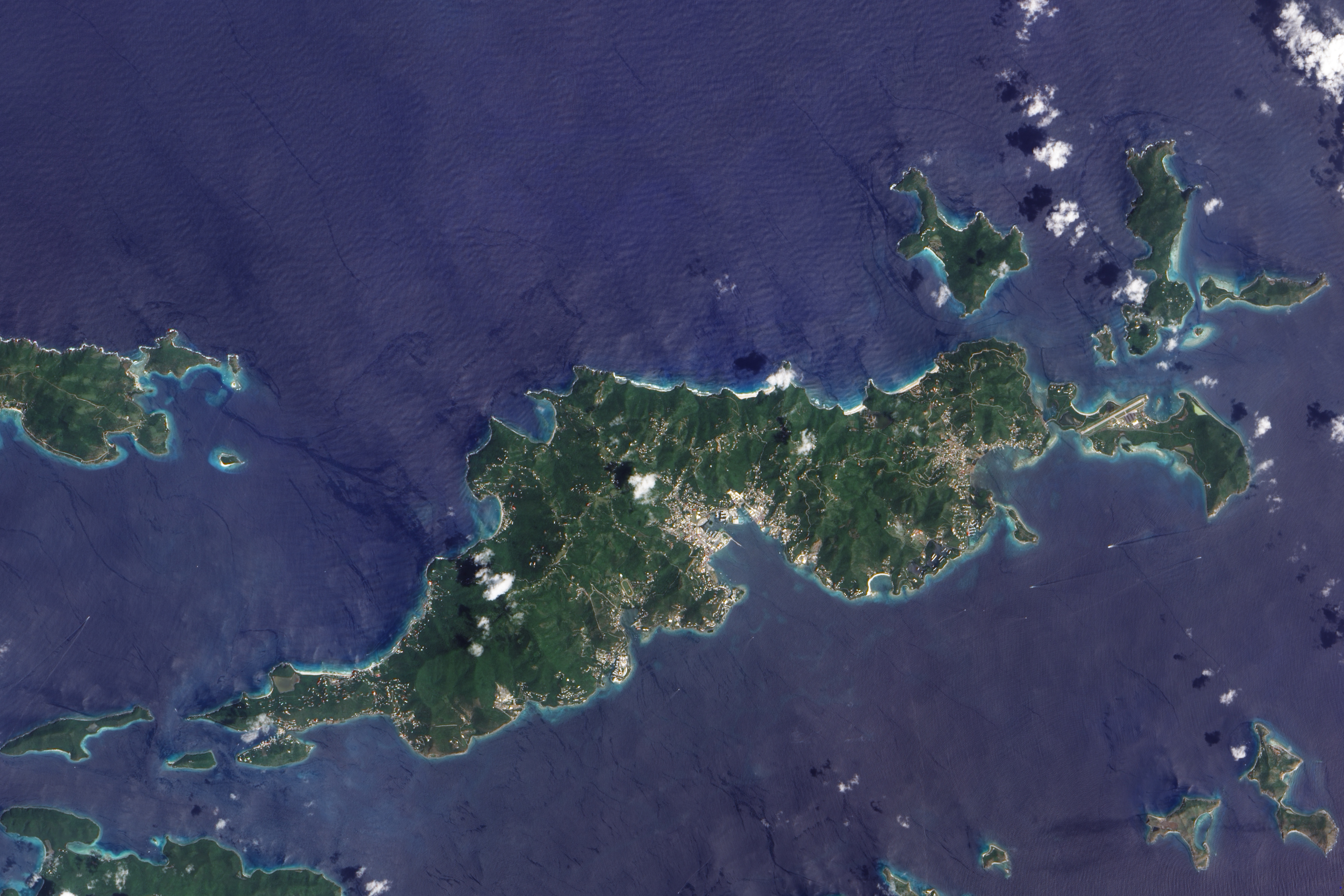
British Virgin Islands – NASA ALI Earth Observing-1 (Visible Color) Satellite Image

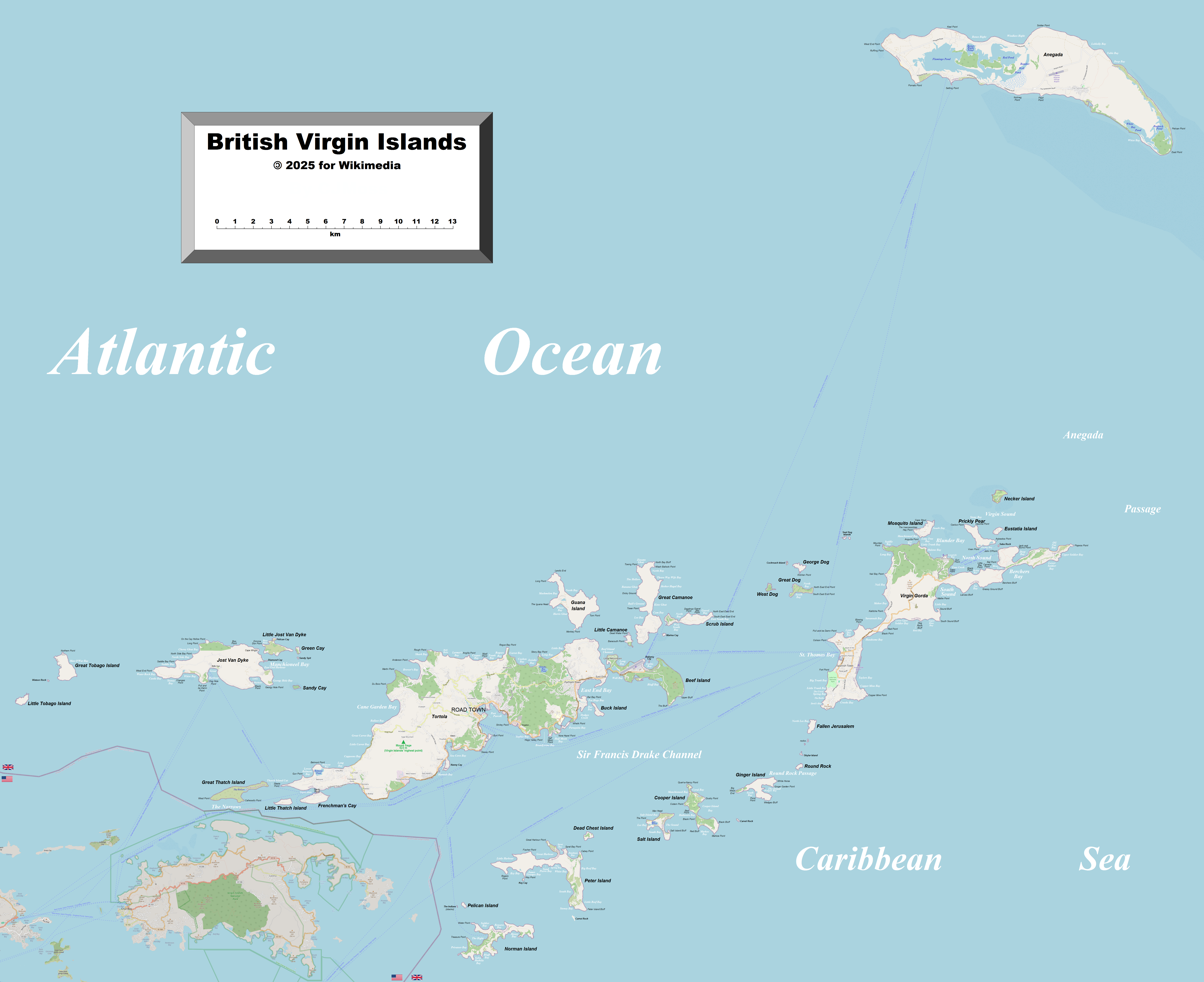
Detailed map of the British Virgin Islands

The majority of the islands are steep and hilly due to their volcanic origin. The lowest point of the island chain is the Caribbean Sea while the highest point is Mount Sage at 521 metres (1,709 ft) above sea level and there are 80 kilometres (50 mi) of coastline. Other than Anegada, the islands are composed of pyroclastic rock and mixed deposits of diorite and tonalite Anegada is geologically distinct, being composed of carbonate reef deposits. The entire archipelago, together with Puerto Rico to the west, is the above-water high points on an underwater ridge that was once a continuous land mass during the Pleistocene epoch. This bank formed from tectonic forces at the boundary where the Caribbean Plate collides with the North American Plate. In the British Virgin Islands forest cover is around 24% of the total land area, equivalent to 3,620 hectares (ha) of forest in 2020, down from 3,710 hectares (ha) in 1990.

== Settlements ==
The capital of the territory and the main port of entry for yachts and cruise ships visiting the BVI is Road Town on Tortola. In 2010, The United Nations found that 83% or the BVI population lived on Tortola, making Road Town the largest population center of the islands.

Spanish Town on Virgin Gorda, also known as "The Valley", is the second largest settlement and the original capital of the territory. Virgin Gorda was mined for copper in the 17th through 19th centuries but declined when the mine closed in 1867. The creation of a yacht harbour and resort by Laurance Rockefeller in the early 1960s turned Spanish Town into a wealthy tourist destination.

Residents on Jost van Dyke, Anegada, Cooper lsland, Great Camanoe Island and other locations collectively make up just over 2% of the population.

== Climate ==
The British Virgin Islands have a tropical savanna climate, moderated by the trade winds. Temperatures vary little throughout the year. In the capital, Road Town, typical daily maxima are around 32 °C (89.6 °F) in the summer and 29 °C (84.2 °F) in the winter. Typical daily minima are around 24 °C (75.2 °F) in the summer and 21 °C (69.8 °F) in the winter. Rainfall averages about 1,150 mm (45.3 in) per year, higher in the hills and lower on the coast. Rainfall can be quite variable, but the wettest months on average are September to November and the driest months on average are February and March. Hurricanes occasionally hit the islands, with the hurricane season running from June to November.

Climate data for Road Town, British Virgin Islands
Month	Jan	Feb	Mar	Apr	May	Jun	Jul	Aug	Sep	Oct	Nov	Dec	Year
Mean maximum °C (°F)	26 (78)	25.3 (77.5)	25.3 (77.6)	25.9 (78.6)	26.7 (80.1)	27.5 (81.5)	27.8 (82.1)	28.1 (82.6)	28.2 (82.8)	27.9 (82.2)	27.2 (80.9)	26.3 (79.3)	28.2 (82.8)
Daily mean °C (°F)	25 (77)	24.7 (76.5)	24.8 (76.6)	25.3 (77.6)	26 (79)	26.9 (80.5)	27.2 (80.9)	27.4 (81.4)	27.5 (81.5)	27 (81)	26.5 (79.7)	25.7 (78.3)	26.2 (79.2)
Mean minimum °C (°F)	24.4 (75.9)	24.1 (75.4)	24.2 (75.5)	24.7 (76.4)	25.4 (77.7)	26.2 (79.2)	26.3 (79.4)	26.6 (79.9)	26.6 (79.9)	26.3 (79.4)	25.7 (78.2)	25 (77)	24.1 (75.4)
Average precipitation mm (inches)	41 (1.6)	33 (1.3)	33 (1.3)	46 (1.8)	84 (3.3)	66 (2.6)	86 (3.4)	110 (4.2)	130 (5.2)	140 (5.6)	120 (4.9)	58 (2.3)	947 (37.5)
Average rainy days	10	8	7	8	12	11	13	15	15	15	14	12	140
Average relative humidity (%)	77	77	76	78	81	81	81	81	81	81	79	77	79
Mean daily daylight hours	8.4	8.6	8.8	9.5	9.6	9.7	9.6	9.3	9.0	8.6	8.3	8.2	9.0
Source: Climate-data.org

== See also ==
- List of Caribbean islands#British Virgin Islands
