= Taxation in the British Virgin Islands =

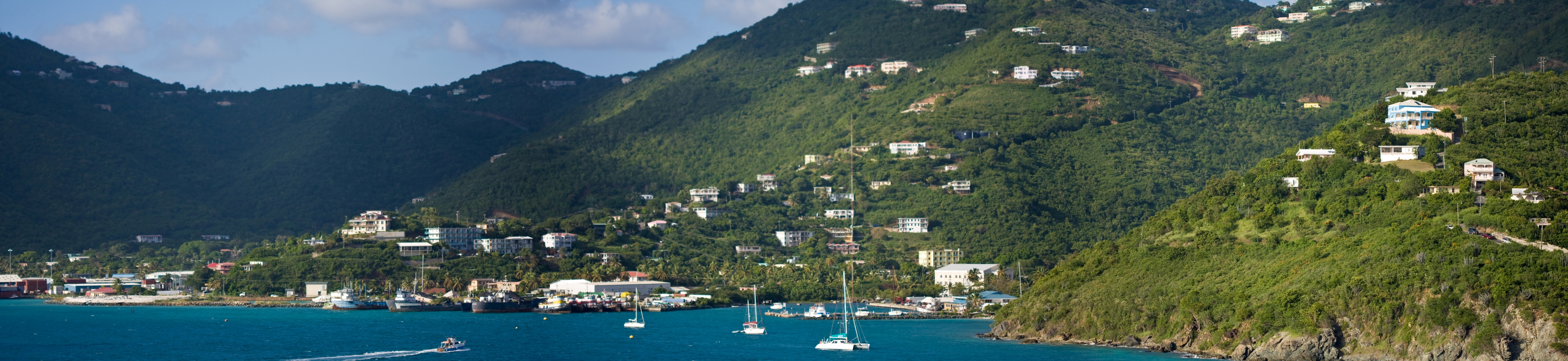
The British Virgin Islands.

Taxation in the British Virgin Islands is relatively simple by comparative standards; photocopies of all of the tax laws of the British Virgin Islands (BVI) would together amount to about 200 pages of paper.

Among the items in the British Virgin Islands that are not subject to taxation:

- no capital gains tax,
- no gift tax,
- no sales tax or value added tax,
- no profit tax,
- no inheritance tax or estate duty, and
- no wealth tax

There is technically still income tax assessed in the British Virgin Islands for companies and individuals, but the rate of taxation has been set at zero. That means that individuals are not obliged to filling obligations on their income tax. However, individuals are subject to a payroll deduction made of up to 8% for employees with additional 2% up to 6% of employer's gross salary paid by employers depending on the category the individuals fall into. There are two categories of employers: "Class 1" and "Class 2" The payroll tax applies to all remunerations/salaries over US$10,000 per annum.

The currency of British Virgin island is US dollar (USD) which makes it easier to interact with the United States Virgin Islands and creates stability and ability to benefit from their reach and reputation they have while still being one of British Overseas Territories. Furthermore, no foreign exchange controls are present. As far as individual taxation is concerned, there are typically certain penalties for not complying with the law. Regarding corporations, there is a system that can be applied to impose penalties in the case of not complying exists. However, both for individuals as well as corporations an official formal ruling or a formal system for tax purposes does not exist.

The absence of most major forms of taxation in the Territory has led to the country being included on most recognised lists of tax havens, although the jurisdiction prefers to style itself as a modern offshore financial centre. The government of British Virgin Islands does not impose any tax on offshore accounts and on top of that, the British Virgin Islands protect the financial security of its clients, account holders. One aspect that the BVI customers can benefit from is the lack of foreign exchange control, resulting in much easier transfers, it also encourages investment and trade while maintaining a protected financial environment and financial privacy.

There are a number of forms of taxation and revenue collection in the British Virgin Islands, but the majority of the Government's revenues are obtained directly from annual licence fees for offshore companies incorporated in the jurisdiction.

== Payroll tax ==
In 2005 the British Virgin Islands introduced a payroll tax in relation to employment and "deemed employment" within the British Virgin Islands. The legislation was brought in at the same time as income tax in the Territory was reduced to zero. The numbers were not in fact a perfect balance, and the Government (deliberately) reduced the amount of tax revenue it received by moving to the payroll tax system. This tax applies to all employee earnings, including wages, salaries, bonuses, commissions, and other benefits. It also encompassed those in "deemed employment," broadening the tax's reach to include non-traditional employment relationships such as certain contractors and consultants. The payroll tax featured varying rates depending on the category of the employer and the total earnings paid, establishing different thresholds for small and large employers and for self-employed individuals. This differentiated approach helped to distribute the tax burden more equitably across various business sizes and types.

By reducing personal income taxes to zero while implementing the payroll tax, the government aimed to shift the tax burden from individuals to businesses, fostering a more business-friendly environment and stimulating economic growth. However, this shift was designed to balance out the lost revenue from income taxes partially. Instead, it was a strategic decision by the government to accept a reduction in tax revenue as a trade-off for potentially higher economic activity and to maintain the Territory's appeal as a low-tax jurisdiction. This adjustment in tax policy was integral to the British Virgin Islands' broader financial strategy.

The tax is paid at a graduated rate depending upon the size of the employer. The current rates (as at June 2007) are 10% for small employers and 14% for larger employers. 8% of the total remuneration is deduction from the employee, the remainder of the liability is met by the employer. The first US$10,000 of remuneration are free from payroll tax.

== Stamp duty ==
Certain limited transactions in the British Virgin Islands are still subject to stamp duty. The main application of the stamp duty legislation relates to transfers of real estate, or transfers of shares in companies which own real estate. The rate of stamp duty on such transactions varies according to the status of the transferee; if the transferee is a Belonger, then stamp duty on land transfers is assessed at 4%; if the transferee is a Non-Belonger, it is assessed at 12%.

The whole concept of belonging is quite complicated in the British Virgin Islands jurisdiction, but generally, the term refers to either people of the BVI origin or individuals who have been for any reason granted long-term residence. It should not be mistaken for citizenship and similarly, being a Belonger does not grant one a citizenship.

The payment of stamp duty tends to be typically required for instruments rather than transactions. If the particular document that should be properly sealed, has not been sealed appropriately, it cannot be accepted at the Land Registry or cannot be used as documentation in legal matters.

The legislation also includes a number of "rump" taxes that were imposed many years ago and subsist only due to a lack of attention in relation to updating legislation; the amounts involved are tiny, and are never enforced in practice. For example, charterparties are technically subject to stamp duty at a rate of 50¢ in the British Virgin Islands, but despite the flourishing bareboat charter industry stamp duty is rarely if ever paid by charterers.

Separately, the British Virgin Islands also imposes various documentary duties which are described as being distinct from stamp duty on various classes of instrument:

- Cheque duty is assessed at 10¢ on each negotiable instrument (including traveller's cheques) presented for payment within the Territory.
- Trust instruments are assessed with trust duty of US$200 (unless they are charitable trusts or bare trusts).

The reason for not referring to these documentary taxes as stamp duty was that under the old International Business Companies Act (Cap 291), companies incorporated under that Act were exempt from stamp duty, and so to retain the payment obligations for those companies, they were referred to as 'cheque duty' and 'trust duty' respectively.

== Land tax and house tax ==
Real estate in the British Virgin Islands is subject to nominal taxation. Because the amounts payable are so small, it is not uncommon for householders to not pay the tax at all, and then discharge all back taxes and penalties when they come to sell their property. The total tax on residential properties rarely exceeds US$100 per annum. The tax costs more to collect than it raises. During the Territory's last review of taxation, considerations were made to amend the law to reduce the amount of taxation collection due to a perception that it penalised second home owners (but not to abolish the taxes).

As with stamp duty, land tax rates are considerably higher for foreigners than for Belongers.

- Belongers pay annually:
  - US$10.00 for the first acre, or part thereof, and
  - US$3.00 for each subsequent acre, or part thereof.
- Non-Belongers pay annually:
  - US$50 for the first half acre, or part thereof,
  - US$150 for the second half acre, or part thereof, and
  - US$50 for each subsequent half acre.

House tax is paid at the same rate for all persons, and is it assessed at 1.5% of the annual rental value of the house. There is a general perception that rental values for owner-occupied homes tend to be assessed as being lower than their actual true market rental value.

== Customs duties ==
Imports into the British Virgin Islands are, subject to certain limited exceptions, subject to import duty. Although this raises a modest amount of government revenue, it tends to be used as a political tool, and to prevent excessive competition with local retailers from the nearby U.S. Virgin Islands. Customs duties are applied ad valorem, which means that they are determined as a percentage of the value of the products, and their rates might change based on the kind of commodities being imported.

These levies must be administered and collected by the BVI Customs Department. They are essential to controlling global trade and bringing in money for the state. In the British Virgin Islands, money from customs duties helps to finance a range of government programs and infrastructure initiatives.

It's important to remember that import and export companies, as well as customers who buy imported items, may be impacted by customs tariffs in the British Virgin Islands.

== EU Withholding tax ==
In common with most British Overseas Territories, the British Virgin Islands had the EU withholding tax imposed upon it in relation to interest payments in the jurisdiction which are payable to natural persons who are resident within the European Union. The withholding tax was not mandatory; depositors can elect not to pay it by agreeing to full disclosure of their account information to the revenue authorities in their country of residence. The implication is that the withholding tax is only applied to those who are not properly declaring their income in their home countries. However, payment of the withholding tax does not exempt the income from any applicable income taxes in the home jurisdiction; there is no double taxation relief under the relevant legislation.

The amounts raised by the EU withholding tax to date have been extremely modest. There are two likely reasons for this; firstly, for an Offshore Financial Centre, the British Virgin Islands has an underdeveloped banking infrastructure compared to (for example) the Cayman Islands or Jersey and so comparatively modest sums are deposited in the Territory's banks; secondly, the withholding tax only affects deposits held by natural persons – because most offshore tax structuring involves the use of either an offshore company or an offshore trust, this usually takes it outside the scope of the tax.

The EU Withholding tax was abolished in favor of disclosure of information with effect from 1 January 2012.

== Tax Treaties and Agreements ==
The British Virgin Islands holds a strategic position in the global financial landscape, characterized by its favorable tax regime and commitment to international cooperation in tax matters. The territory has pursued a proactive approach to entering into tax treaties and agreements with other jurisdictions, aimed at promoting transparency, preventing double taxation, and fostering cooperation in tax-related issues.

The British Virgin Islands has engaged in bilateral and multilateral agreements to facilitate tax cooperation and information exchange with other countries and jurisdictions. These agreements enhance the territory's credibility as a responsible financial center and provide a framework for addressing cross-border tax-related challenges.

One significant aspect of the British Virgin Islands' approach to international tax treaties is the negotiation of double taxation treaties. These treaties aim to eliminate the potential for double taxation of income earned by residents of one jurisdiction in another jurisdiction. By establishing clear rules for the allocation of taxing rights and providing mechanisms for resolving disputes, double taxation treaties contribute to a more efficient and equitable tax system.

In line with global efforts to combat tax evasion and promote transparency, the British Virgin Islands has actively participated in initiatives for the exchange of tax information. The territory has entered into agreements, such as Tax Information Exchange Agreements and the Common Reporting Standard, which facilitate the automatic exchange of financial account information with other jurisdictions. These agreements enable tax authorities to access relevant information to ensure compliance with tax laws and combat illicit financial activities.

Beyond addressing specific tax issues, the British Virgin Islands' tax treaties and agreements also serve to promote broader cooperation in tax matters. Through mechanisms for mutual assistance and collaboration, the territory seeks to build trust and strengthen relationships with other countries and jurisdictions. This collaborative approach contributes to the stability and integrity of the global tax system while supporting the territory's position as a leading international financial center. British Virgin Islands: tax treatiesTax Information Exchange AgreementsUK-BVI Tax Information Exchange & Double Taxation Agreements

== Tax Education and Awareness ==
Tax education and awareness play a vital role in fostering compliance, transparency, and accountability in the British Virgin Islands. Initiatives aimed at educating residents, businesses, and investors about tax laws, obligations, and responsibilities are essential for building a culture of tax compliance and promoting a fair and equitable tax system. Various stakeholders, including government agencies, industry associations, and civil society organizations, have implemented educational programs, workshops, and outreach efforts to enhance tax literacy and awareness.

The government of the British Virgin Islands has taken proactive steps to promote tax education and awareness among its citizens and residents. The International Tax Authority (ITA), in collaboration with other government agencies, organizes educational seminars, workshops, and public forums to provide information on tax laws, regulations, and compliance requirements. These initiatives aim to empower individuals and businesses with the knowledge and resources needed to fulfill their tax obligations and navigate the tax system effectively.

Industry associations and professional bodies in the British Virgin Islands play a crucial role in promoting tax education and awareness within their respective sectors. Organizations such as the BVI International Financial Centre, the British Virgin Islands Bar Association, and the British Virgin Islands Association of Compliance Officers regularly conduct training programs, webinars, and conferences on tax-related topics. These initiatives help professionals stay informed about changes in tax laws, regulatory developments, and best practices in tax compliance.

Civil society organizations also contribute to tax education and awareness efforts in the British Virgin Islands. Non-governmental organizations, community groups, and advocacy organizations organize outreach activities, public awareness campaigns, and educational resources to inform the public about tax-related issues and promote fiscal responsibility. By engaging with diverse stakeholders and raising awareness about tax matters, Civil society organizations play a vital role in building a more informed and engaged citizenry.

Collaborative efforts between government agencies, industry associations, and civil society organizations have led to the development of joint initiatives and partnerships aimed at enhancing tax education and awareness in the British Virgin Islands. Public-private partnerships leverage the resources, expertise, and networks of different stakeholders to reach a wider audience and deliver more effective educational programs and outreach activities. By working together, stakeholders can maximize their impact and address the diverse needs of the community. BVI FSC Newsletter: May 2023 | British Virgin Islands Financial Services Commission

== Anti-avoidance Rules ==
British Virgin Islands is a country famous for having very favorable tax policies, earning the title of a tax haven. What contributes to this state is the absence of a transfer pricing rule, a deduction limitation rule or any anti-hybrid rules. The country does not follow any general anti-avoidance rule.

There is a set of commonly named relevant activities, this set includes activities in following branches: banking, insurance, finance and leasing, shipping, holding, distribution, fund management, headquarters, holding, intellectual property and lastly service center. The Economic Substance (ESA) requires all foreign companies, limited partnerships acting in the British Virgin Islands to follow the prescribed requirements by the ESA. In other words, all legal entities must annually provide enough information and documentation so that the International Tax Authority can verify and assess whether the entity is engaged in relevant activities.

The British Virgin Islands does not have any tax treaties. However, it has signed multiple information-exchange agreements, including the Multilateral Convention on Mutual Administrative Assistance in Tax Matters or the Multilateral Competent Authority Agreement on Automatic Exchange of Financial Account Information.

== Tax Enforcement and Compliance ==
Tax enforcement and compliance play a crucial role in maintaining the integrity and effectiveness of the British Virgin Islands' tax regime. The territory has implemented robust mechanisms and processes to monitor and enforce tax laws, investigate non-compliance, and impose penalties or sanctions on offenders.

The British Virgin Islands has established dedicated tax authorities and regulatory bodies responsible for overseeing tax compliance and enforcement. These include the International Tax Authority (ITA), the Financial Services Commission (FSC), and the Attorney General's Chambers. These agencies work collaboratively to ensure adherence to tax laws and regulations.

Tax authorities in the British Virgin Islands employ various methods to monitor tax compliance among individuals, businesses, and other entities. This includes conducting audits, reviewing financial records, and analyzing tax returns to identify discrepancies or irregularities. Additionally, the territory participates in international initiatives for the exchange of tax information, enabling authorities to access relevant data to verify compliance.

In cases of suspected non-compliance or tax evasion, tax authorities in the British Virgin Islands have the authority to initiate investigations and enforcement actions. This may involve conducting inquiries, gathering evidence, and taking legal measures to enforce tax laws. Depending on the severity of the violation, offenders may face penalties, fines, or legal consequences.

Audits and investigations play a pivotal role in ensuring tax compliance and detecting instances of non-compliance. Tax authorities conduct audits to assess the accuracy and completeness of tax returns, identify potential areas of risk, and verify compliance with tax laws. Investigations are initiated in response to suspected violations and may involve extensive inquiries, interviews, and data analysis to uncover evidence of wrongdoing.

Individuals or entities found to be in breach of tax laws in the British Virgin Islands may face penalties or sanctions imposed by tax authorities. These penalties may include monetary fines, interest on unpaid taxes, or legal consequences such as prosecution or civil litigation. Penalties for non-compliance with economic substance obligations and requirements can be severe. The maximum penalty is $400,000. Which is not very common, usually it is about $20,000. The severity of penalties depends on factors such as the nature and extent of the violation, the taxpayer's compliance history, and mitigating circumstances. At a glance: economic substance enforcement and compliance in British Virgin Islands

== Impact of Global Tax Reforms ==
The British Virgin Islands operates within a dynamic global tax landscape that is subject to ongoing reforms and regulatory changes. The territory's tax system and offshore financial industry are significantly influenced by key developments in international tax policy, including initiatives proposed by organizations such as the Organisation for Economic Co-operation and Development (OECD) and the European Union. Understanding the potential impact of these global tax reforms is essential for policymakers, businesses, and stakeholders in the British Virgin Islands.

The OECD's Pillar One and Pillar Two proposals represent significant efforts to address challenges related to the taxation of multinational corporations in the digital age and combat base erosion and profit shifting. Pillar One focuses on allocating taxing rights and revising international tax rules to ensure that multinational corporations pay taxes where they generate value, particularly in the digital economy. Pillar Two aims to establish a global minimum tax rate and introduce rules to prevent the erosion of tax bases.

The implementation of these OECD proposals could have implications for the British Virgin Islands’ tax system and offshore financial industry. As a jurisdiction that attracts significant foreign investment and hosts numerous multinational entities, they may need to adjust its tax policies and regulations to align with international standards and address concerns related to tax avoidance and profit shifting.

The EU has also been proactive in introducing tax initiatives aimed at promoting tax transparency, combating tax evasion, and ensuring fair taxation within the European Single Market. These initiatives include directives on mandatory disclosure rules, cross-border tax rulings, and the EU list of non-cooperative jurisdictions for tax purposes.

While the British Virgin Islands is not part of the EU, developments in EU tax policy can indirectly affect the territory's tax system and financial industry. Increased scrutiny on tax matters and regulatory harmonization within the EU may influence the behavior of investors, businesses, and financial institutions operating in or interacting with them.

Regulatory changes in major financial centers, such as the United States, the United Kingdom, and Switzerland, can also impact the British Virgin Islands’ tax policies and competitiveness. These changes may include amendments to tax laws, updates to anti-money laundering and counter-terrorism financing regulations, and shifts in global tax planning strategies.

For example, initiatives such as the US Foreign Account Tax Compliance Act (FATCA) and the UK's Criminal Finances Act have implications for entities and individuals with connections to the British Virgin Islands. Compliance with these regulations may require adjustments to reporting requirements, due diligence procedures, and tax planning strategies. As global tax launches, impact here unclear - The BVI BeaconParadise Lost or Gained? The Untold Impact of Global Tax Reforms on Your Offshore Wealth

== Miscellaneous other taxes ==
The British Virgin Islands has a number of other minor taxes and levies. These include:

- Car tax, under the Self-Drive vehicles (Rentals) (Taxation) Act (Cap 210)
- Hotel tax, under the Hotel Accommodation Taxation Act (Cap 205)
- Petroleum income tax, under the Petroleum Income Tax Act (Cap 209)
- Passenger tax, under the Passengers Tax Act (Cap 208)
- A tax is assessed on charterers, although it is characterised as a "permit" under the Cruising Permits Act (Cap 207)

In addition there are a huge number of miscellaneous Governmental fees and charges which are levied pursuant to the Statutory Rates, Fees and Charges Act, 2005.

== See also ==
- British Virgin Islands tax law
