= Fort Charlotte, Tortola =

Fort built in Tortola, British Virgin Islands

Coordinates: 18.4135°N 64.6233°W

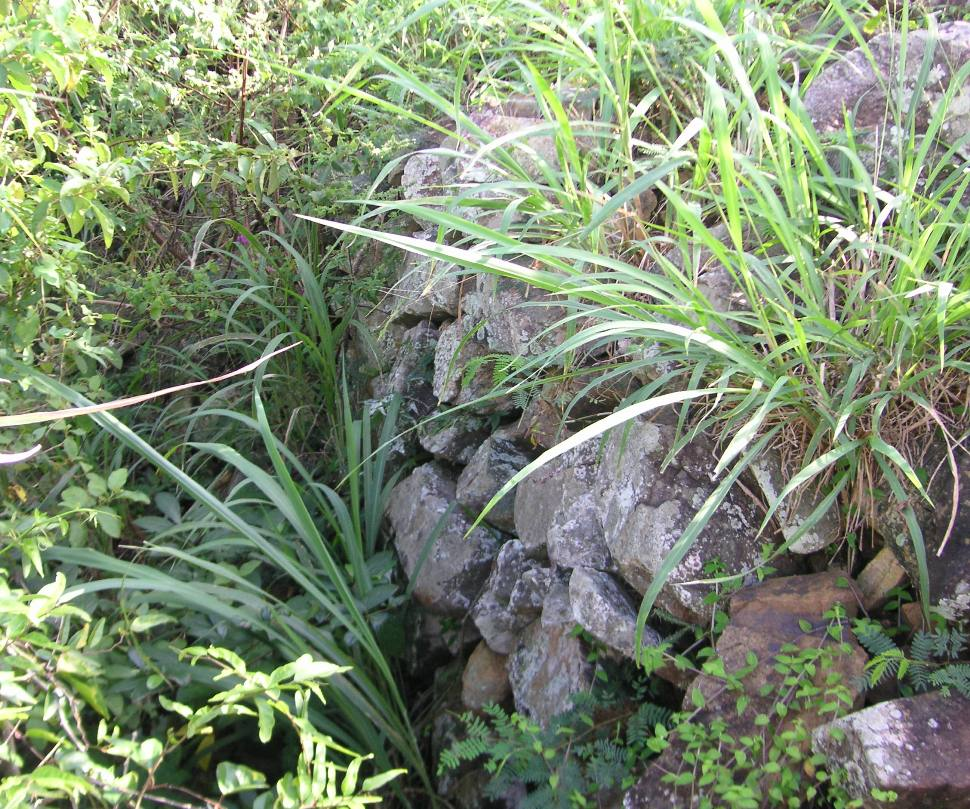
Part of the remains of the walls of Fort Charlotte

Fort Charlotte is a fort built on Harrigan's Hill (above Macnamara), Tortola, British Virgin Islands. The fort was named after Queen Charlotte.

== History ==
The fort was built by the British Royal Engineers in 1794 at an elevation of approximately 947 feet over Road Town, and was erected on top of an earlier wooden stockade believed to have been originally built by the privateer Joost van Dyk to act as a lookout post. The fort was not a walled fort in the traditional sense, but an earthen one; however, its elevation meant that there was absolutely no prospect of being fired upon by the cannon of incoming ships. The only way in which the Fort could have been taken, had it ever fallen, would have been for troops to climb the hill while under heavy musket and cannon fire.

Fort Charlotte formed part of a triangular defensive formation around Road Harbour. On the south west side of the harbour lay Fort Burt while Fort George was situated on the west with Road Town Fort located in between. Towering above was Fort Charlotte, with the range and guns to fire on any ship entering the harbour without any fear of return fire. Accordingly, any ship seeking to attack the town would have to withstand fire from both Fort Charlotte and either Fort Burt or Fort George, but would have to actually land and climb Harrigan's Hill (with weaponry) to a height of nearly 900 feet before they could actually return fire on the garrison.

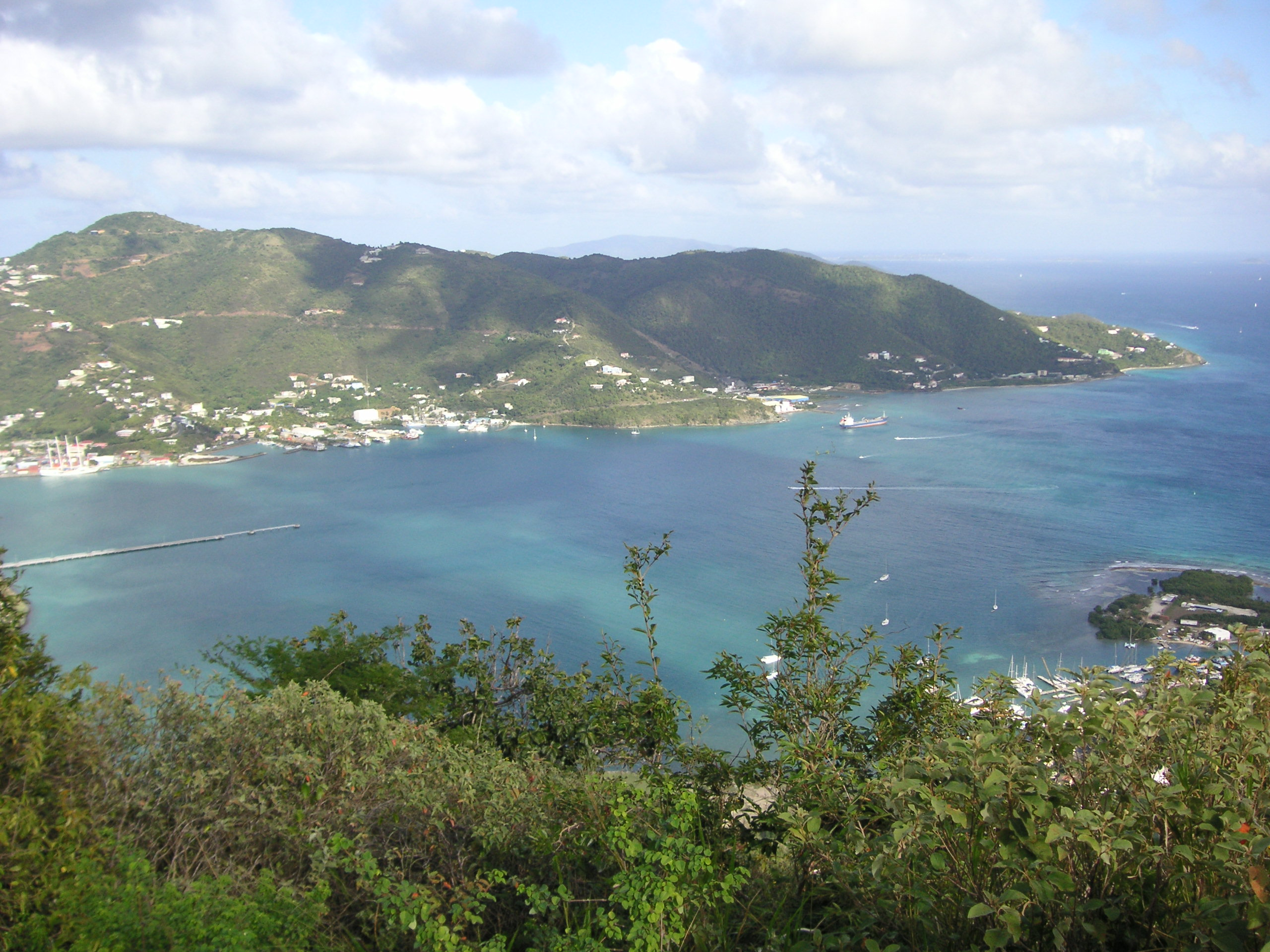
The commanding view over Road Harbour from Fort Charlotte

Road Town became the Territory's capital instead of much better anchorages at Soper's Hole, Hodge's Creek and Spanish Town on Virgin Gorda (each of which at some point in the Territory's history acted as the centre of administration for the islands) largely because of its instrinsic defensiveness in a highly turbulent era. Tortola had been sacked by Spanish pirates in 1685 and Tortola was actually occupied by pirates for several days in 1686, but was never attacked again subsequent to the construction of Fort Charlotte.

Tortola was never again attacked during the turbulent colonial era, and it is reasonable to surmise that the combination of the relatively low economic value of the Territory, and the relatively formidable defences, simply meant that it was an equally unattractive target for competing colonial powers on the one hand and privateers and pirates on the other.

== Present day ==
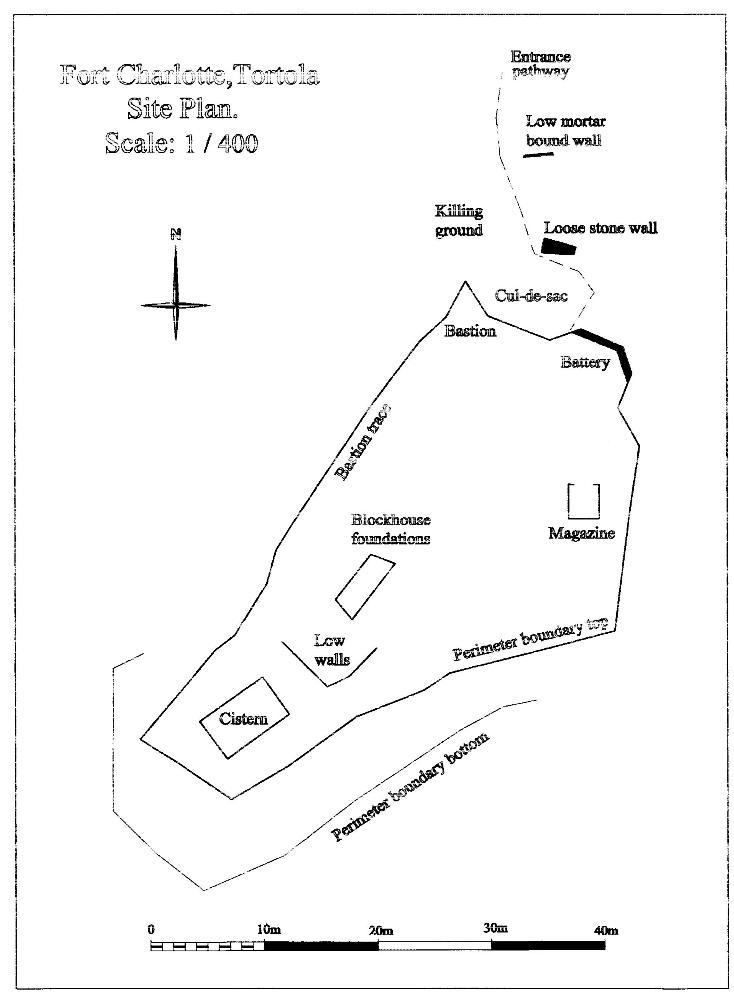
A survey plan of the remains of Fort Charlotte

The fort is now a barely recognisable ruin. All that remains are a few crumbling walls, a cistern and an underground magazine. The area of the Fort is heavily overgrown, and for safety reasons the government has sealed off the cistern to avoid the possibility of tourists falling in.

The hike to Fort Charlotte (there is no road) is considerably less arduous since the government cut a road from the top of Macnamara to the ridge, but it is still a good climb, and a machete to clear the bush that frequently overgrows the donkey track leading to the fort is usually a necessity during the wet season.

Like many historical buildings in the British Virgin Islands, Fort Charlotte sits on private land with (at present) no public right of way to the Fort; however, local landowners have (to date) been reasonably relaxed about the occasional tourists and students hiking across their land to find the remains of the Fort. The government has signaled its intent to make Fort Charlotte more accessible, but no action has yet been taken.

== See also ==
- History of the British Virgin Islands
