= Road Town Fort =

Coordinates: 18.4203°N 64.6184°W

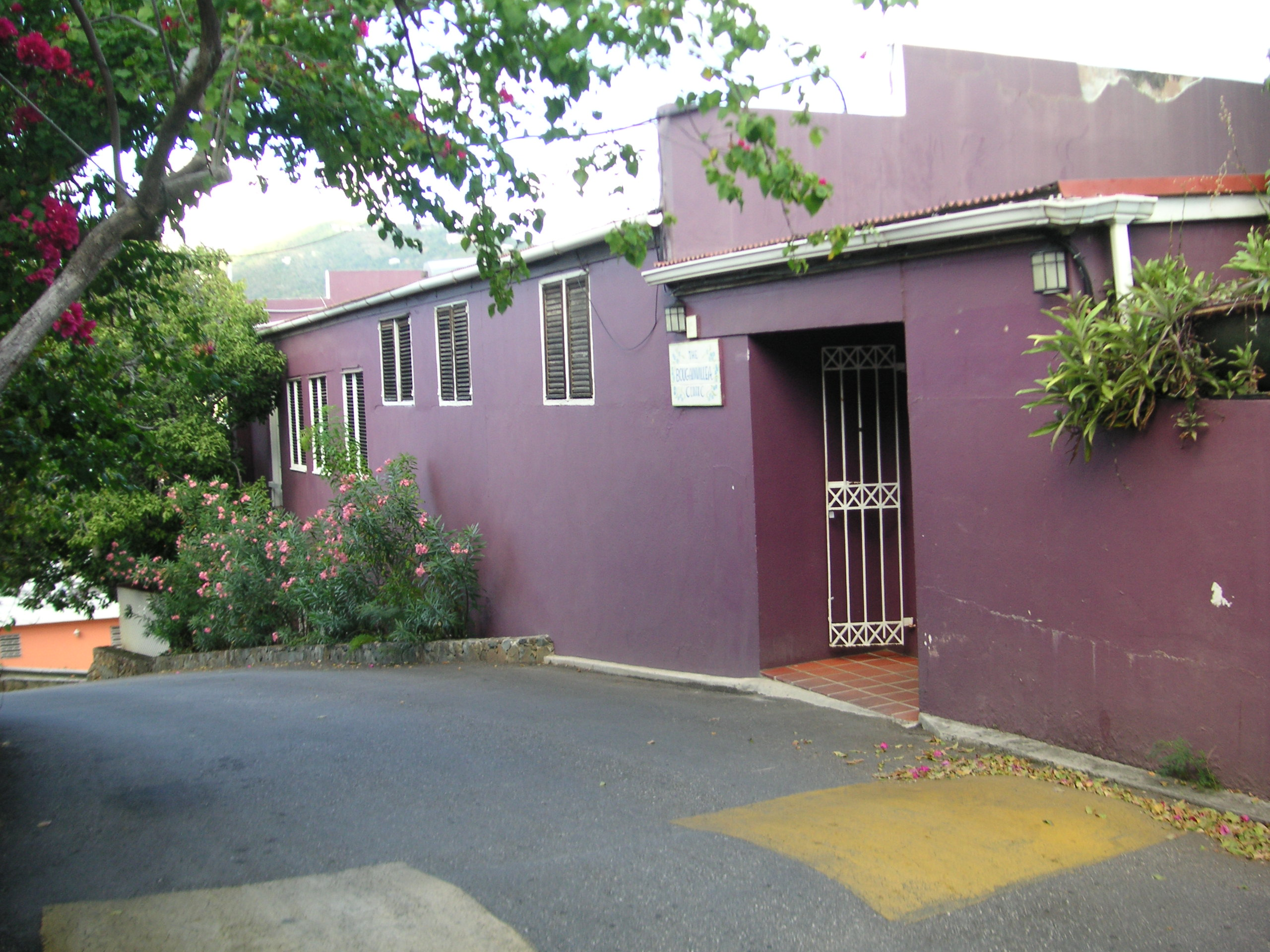
The Bougainvillea clinic, built on the foundations of Road Town Fort.

Road Town Fort is a colonial fort which was erected on Russell Hill in Road Town, Tortola in the British Virgin Islands above the town's main wharf. In historical records it is sometimes referred to as Fort Road Town. The fort subsequently fell into ruin, and in the 1960s the Bougainvillea clinic (known locally as the Purple Palace for fairly obvious reasons) was built on top of the old structure. The strong room of the original fort, which was once the Territory's treasury, still survives today, and is now used as a storeroom by the clinic.

However, the main fortification was built by the British in the late 18th century around the outbreak of the American War of Independence as part of the general upgrade of the fortifications of Road Town, and it was garrisoned throughout the Napoleonic Wars. After the end of the Napoleonic Wars, and the abolition of slavery the fort was eventually abandoned as the Territory sank into economic decline, and the expense of its upkeep could no longer be justified.

Road Town Fort formed part of a formidable defensive network of forts around Road Town erected at this time. Road Town itself was triangulated with Fort Burt in the western entrance to the harbour, Fort George at the eastern entrance, Road Town Fort in the middle above the main jetty, and Fort Charlotte set high above on Harrigan's Hill.

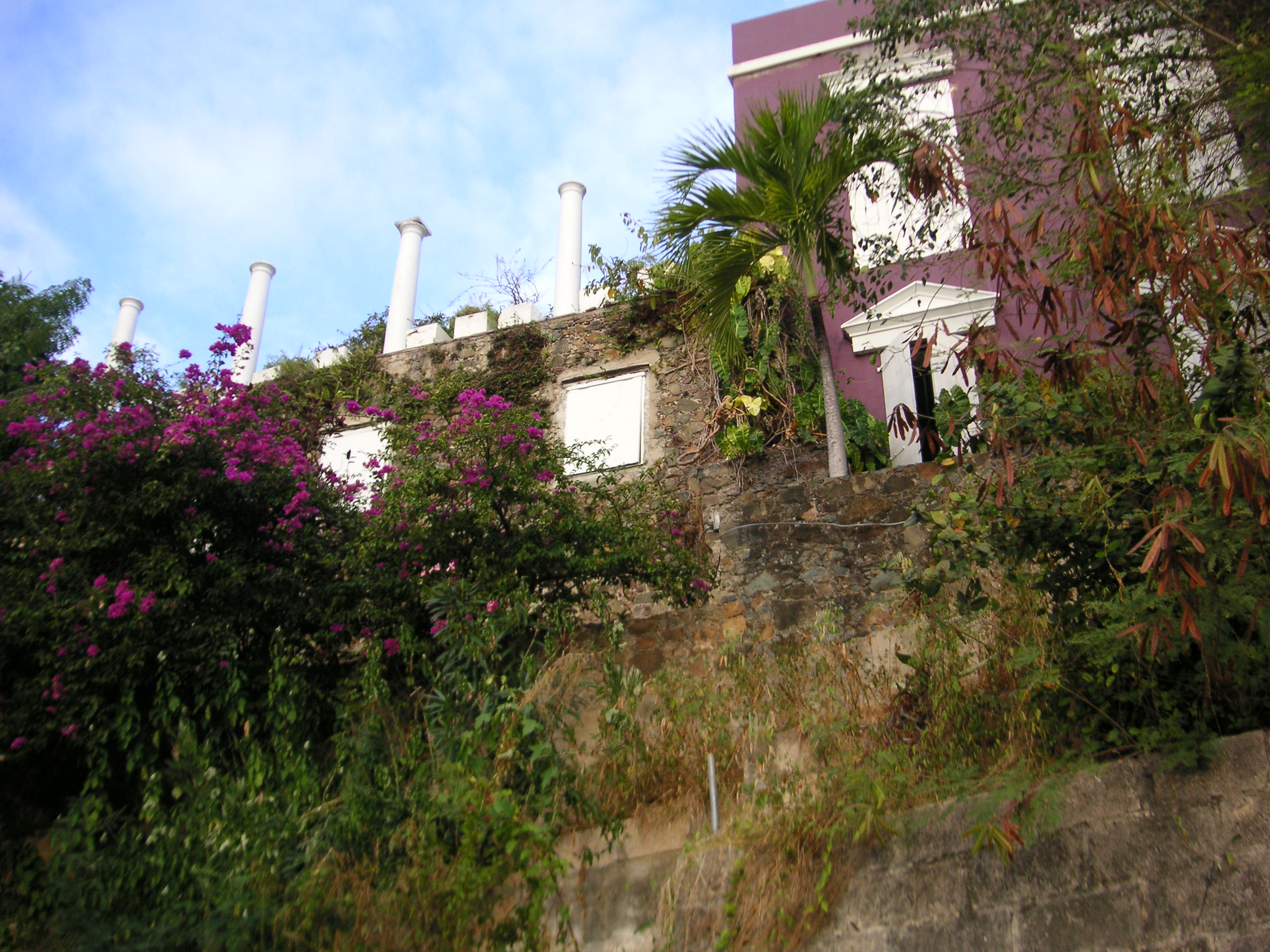
Some of the original walls remain visible from Main Street below.

It is possible that the Road Town Fort was built on the remains of an earlier Dutch stockade; it is known that two forts erected by the British in Road Town were built on what were thought (by them) to be earlier Dutch sites, but they are believed to be Fort Burt and Fort George. However, some historians are less sure about Fort Burt (as it does not tie in with Spanish records relating to their attacks on Tortola in the 17th century) and it may be that one of the former Dutch stockades lies under Road Town Fort. Fort Charlotte was built on an earlier Dutch look-out post.

Road Town Fort never actually engaged in combat. The combination of the formidable martial defences of Road Town, and relatively small strategic and economic importance of Tortola persuaded both foreign colonial powers and privateers and pirates alike to focus on other targets within the region. Given the prevalence of the attacks on Road Town by Spanish privateers prior to the re-fortification of Road Town, the Road Town Fort could be said to have fulfilled its role it was intended for despite the absence of battle.

The clinic is a private clinic, and there is no general public access to the remains of the structure. However, from Main Street below, looking up, one can still see some of the remains of the outer wall.

== See also ==
- History of the British Virgin Islands
