= 1943 in the British Virgin Islands =

- Decades
- See also: Other events of 1943; Timeline of BVI history

== February ==
- 23 February 1943 - HMS Rhexenor was torpedoed by a German submarine and 16 sailors were rescued in Jost van Dyke, one of the British Virgin Islands.

== May ==
Commemorative plaque celebrating the opening of the first secondary school.

- 3 May 1943 - First ever secondary school and library are opened in the Territory by Thomas Dixon Green, the inaugural principal.

== August ==
- 17 August - the St. Thomas Labor Industrial Association is formed by a group of skilled and unskilled workmen.
