= Fort Burt =

Colonial fort, hotel and restaurant

Coordinates: 18.4129°N 64.6147°W

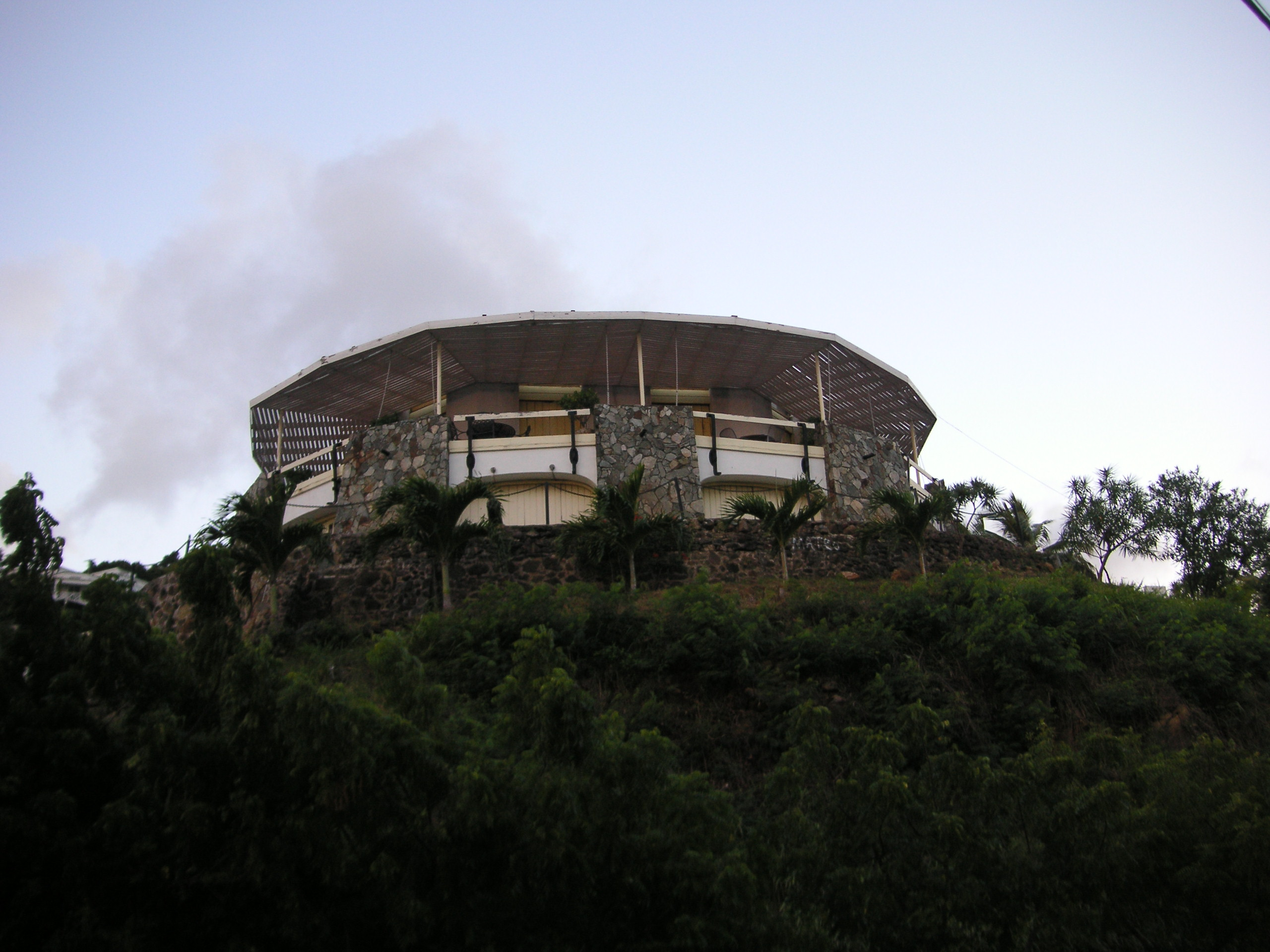
Fort Burt today. None of what is visible is part of the original fort, although one of the original cannon is visible poking out from the balcony.

Fort Burt is a colonial fort that was erected on the southwest edge of Road Town, Tortola in the British Virgin Islands above Road Reef Marina. The site is now a hotel and restaurant of the same name, and little of the original structure remains. However, one of the original cannons has survived and stands on the veranda of the hotel, looking over the harbour.

The original structure is believed by some to have been built at an unascertained date by the original Dutch settlers of the islands, although this is not certain as Spanish documents from this time refer to other forts on Tortola (which they attacked) and they make no mention of a defensive fortification at Fort Burt although the route of their attack (from Soper's hole, through Fort Purcell and on to Fort George would have taken them directly by the site of Fort Burt. In his book, Vernon Pickering suggests that the British erected the Fort on a site that they "erroneously believed" to have been the site of an earlier Dutch fort. However, the main fortification was built (or rebuilt) by the British in 1776 at the outbreak of the American War of Independence.

The fort was named after William Mathew Burt, Governor of the Leeward Islands from 1776 to 1781 (but not to be confused with Colonel William Burt, his great grandfather, who took the Territory for the British from the Dutch with a token force at the outbreak of the Third Anglo-Dutch War in 1672). Descendants of this family now live in Western Australia.

Fort Burt formed part of a formidable defensive network of forts around Road Town at this time, including Fort Road Town (under what is now the site of the Boungainvillea clinic), Fort George on Fort Hill on the north east side of the harbour, and Fort Charlotte set high above on Harrigan's Hill.

Fort Burt never actually fired a shot in anger under British command. The combination of the formidable martial defences of Road Town, and relatively small strategic and economic importance of Tortola persuaded both foreign colonial powers and privateers and pirates alike to focus on other targets within the region.

The fort later fell again into disrepair, and it was acquired in 1953 by Commander Christopher Hammersley and his socialite wife, who built what was then the only hotel on Tortola. The hotel has changed hands several times since, and is now in the ownership of the Pusser's chain.

== See also ==
- History of the British Virgin Islands
