= Fort George, Tortola =

Coordinates: 18.426°N 64.607°W

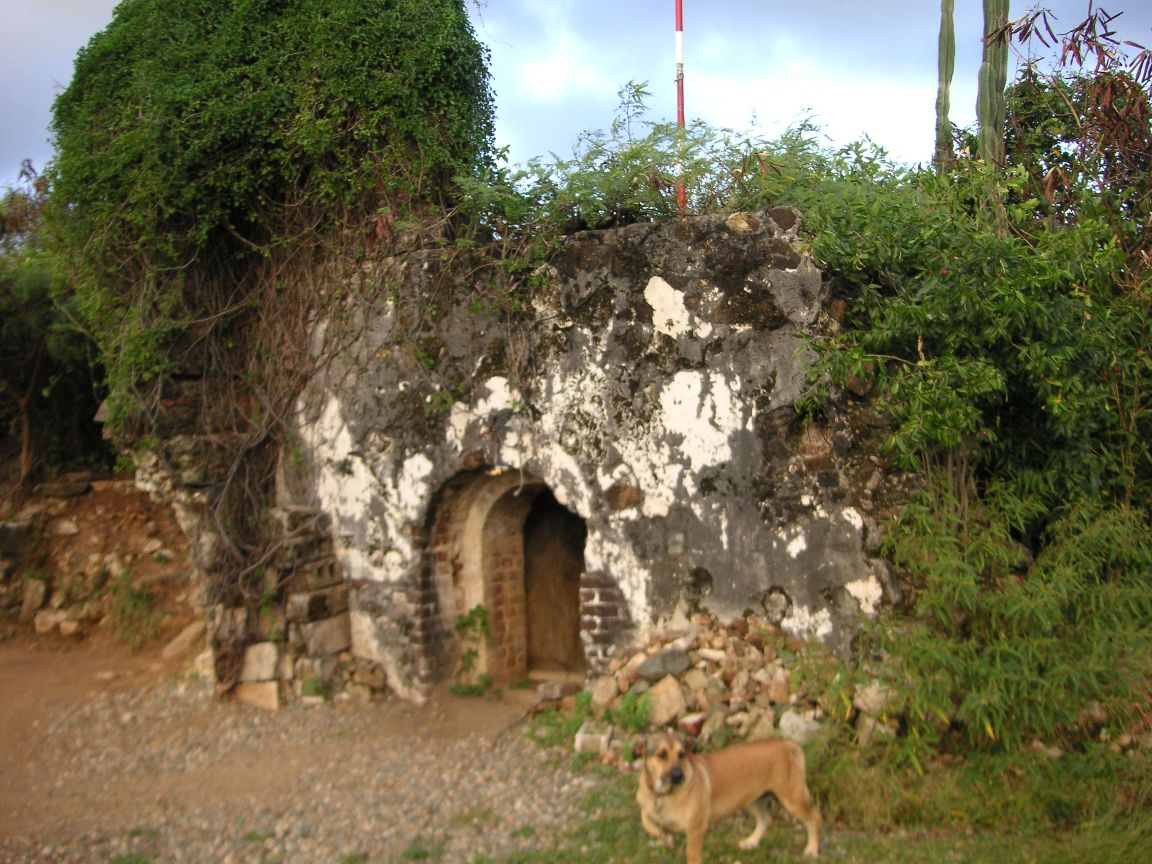
Fort George in 2006. The remains are in a poor state of repair, and local livestock discourages close inspections.

Fort George is a colonial fort which was erected on the northeast edge of Road Town, Tortola in the British Virgin Islands above Baugher's Bay. The site is now a ruin.

The original structure is believed by some to have been built at an unascertained date by the original Dutch settlers of the islands to protect slave pens that were built in Port Purcell below. It is likely that the initial structure was built in response to a massacre of the inhabitants of the original settlement in Baugher's Bay in 1625.

However, the main fortification was built (or rebuilt) by the British in the late 18th century around the outbreak of the American War of Independence as part of the general upgrade of the fortifications of Road Town.

The fort was named (or renamed) after King George III.

Fort George formed part of a formidable defensive network of forts around Road Town at this time, including the eponymous Road Town Fort (under what is now the site of the Boungainvillea clinic), Fort Burt above Road Reef on the south west side of the harbour, and Fort Charlotte set high above on Harrigan's Hill.

Fort George never actually engaged in combat after restoration by the British. The combination of the formidable martial defences of Road Town, and relatively small strategic and economic importance of Tortola persuaded both foreign colonial powers and privateers and pirates alike to focus on other targets within the region.

Today the remains of the fort are barely recognisable. Despite being featured in the British Virgin Island government's promotional website the remains of the Fort are on private land, to which there is no public access. The property has a house on it, which is rented, and access to the site depends upon the goodwill of the incumbent tenants. As of 2007 the remains are predominantly used as storage.

== See also ==
- History of the British Virgin Islands
