= History of the British Virgin Islands =

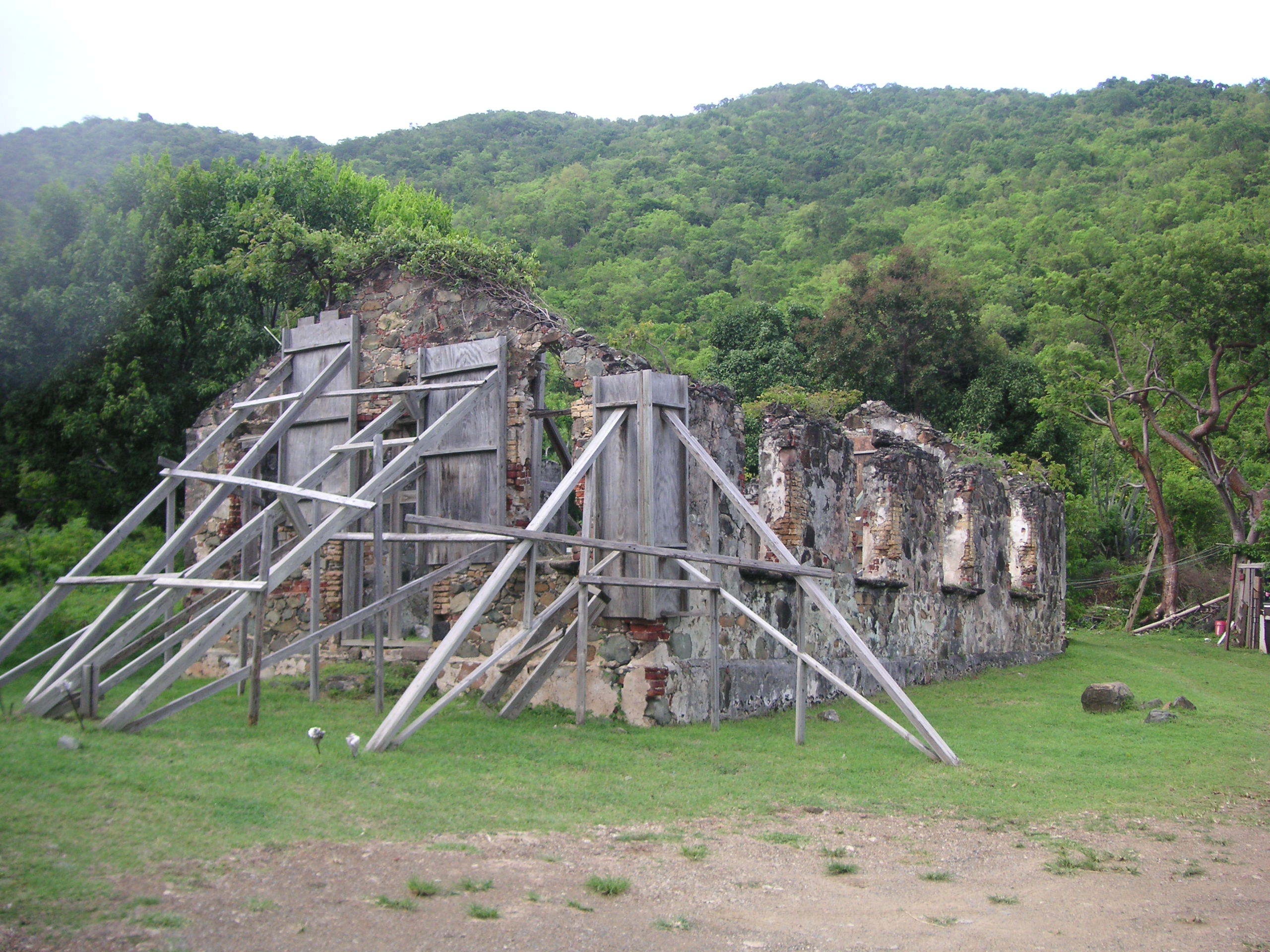
The ruins of St Phillip's Church, Tortola, one of the most important historical ruins in the Territory.

The history of the British Virgin Islands is usually, for convenience, broken up into five separate periods:

- Pre-Columbian Amerindian settlement, up to an uncertain date
- Nascent European settlement, from approximately 1612 until 1672
- British control, from 1672 until 1834
- Emancipation, from 1834 until 1950
- The modern state, from 1950 to present day

These time periods are used for convenience only. There appears to be an uncertain period of time from when the last Arawak left what would later be called the British Virgin Islands until the first Europeans started to settle there in the early 17th century, when records of any settlement are unclear. Each of the above periods is marked by a dramatic change from the preceding time period, providing a way to define the history.

== Pre-Columbian settlement ==
The first recorded settlement of the Territory was by Arawak Indians who came from South America, in around 100 BC. Vernon Pickering places the date later, at around 200 AD, and suggests that the Arawak may have been preceded by the Ciboney Indians. They are thought to have settled in nearby St. Thomas as early as 300 BC. There is some evidence of Amerindian presence on the islands. perhaps in seasonal fishing camps, as far back as 1500 BC. There is little academic support for the idea of a permanent settlement on any of the current British Virgin Islands at that time.

The Arawak inhabited the islands until the 15th century, when they were displaced by the more aggressive Caribs, a tribe from the Lesser Antilles islands. The Caribbean Sea is named for these people.

None of the later European visitors to the Virgin Islands reported encountering Amerindians in what would later be the British Virgin Islands. Christopher Columbus did have a hostile encounter with the Carib natives of St. Croix.

Comparatively little is known about the early inhabitants of this territory specifically (as opposed to the Arawak generally). The largest excavations of Arawak pottery have been found around Belmont and Smuggler's Cove on the northwest of Tortola. Many other archeological sites have been found with Arawak artifacts, including at Soper's Hole, Apple Bay, Coxheath, Pockwood Pond, Pleasant Valley, Sage Mountain, Russell Hill (modern day Road Town), Pasea, Purcell, Paraquita Bay, Josiah's Bay, Mount Healthy and Cane Garden Bay. Modern archaeological excavations regularly cause local historians to revise what they thought they knew about these early settlers. Discoveries reported in the local newspapers in 2006 have indicated that early Arawak settlement of the islands may have been more significant than had earlier been thought.

== 1492: Early European exploration ==
The first European sighting of the Virgin Islands was by Christopher Columbus in 1493 on his second voyage to the Americas. Columbus gave them the name Santa Ursula y las Once Mil Vírgenes (Saint Ursula and her 11,000 Virgins), shortened to Las Vírgenes (The Virgins), after the legend of Saint Ursula. He is also reported to have personally named Virgin Gorda (the Fat Virgin), which he thought to be the largest island in the group.

The Spanish claimed the islands by original discovery, but never settled the Territory. In 1508, Juan Ponce de León settled Puerto Rico, and reports in Spanish journals suggested that the settlement used the Virgin Islands for fishing, but nothing else. Their references may have been to the present U.S. Virgin Islands, which are closer.

In 1517, Sebastian Cabot and Thomas Spert visited the islands on their return from exploring Brazilian waters. Sir John Hawkins visited the islands three times, firstly in 1542 and then again in 1563 with a cargo of slaves bound for Hispaniola. On his third visit, he was accompanied by a young captain by the name of Francis Drake in the Judith.

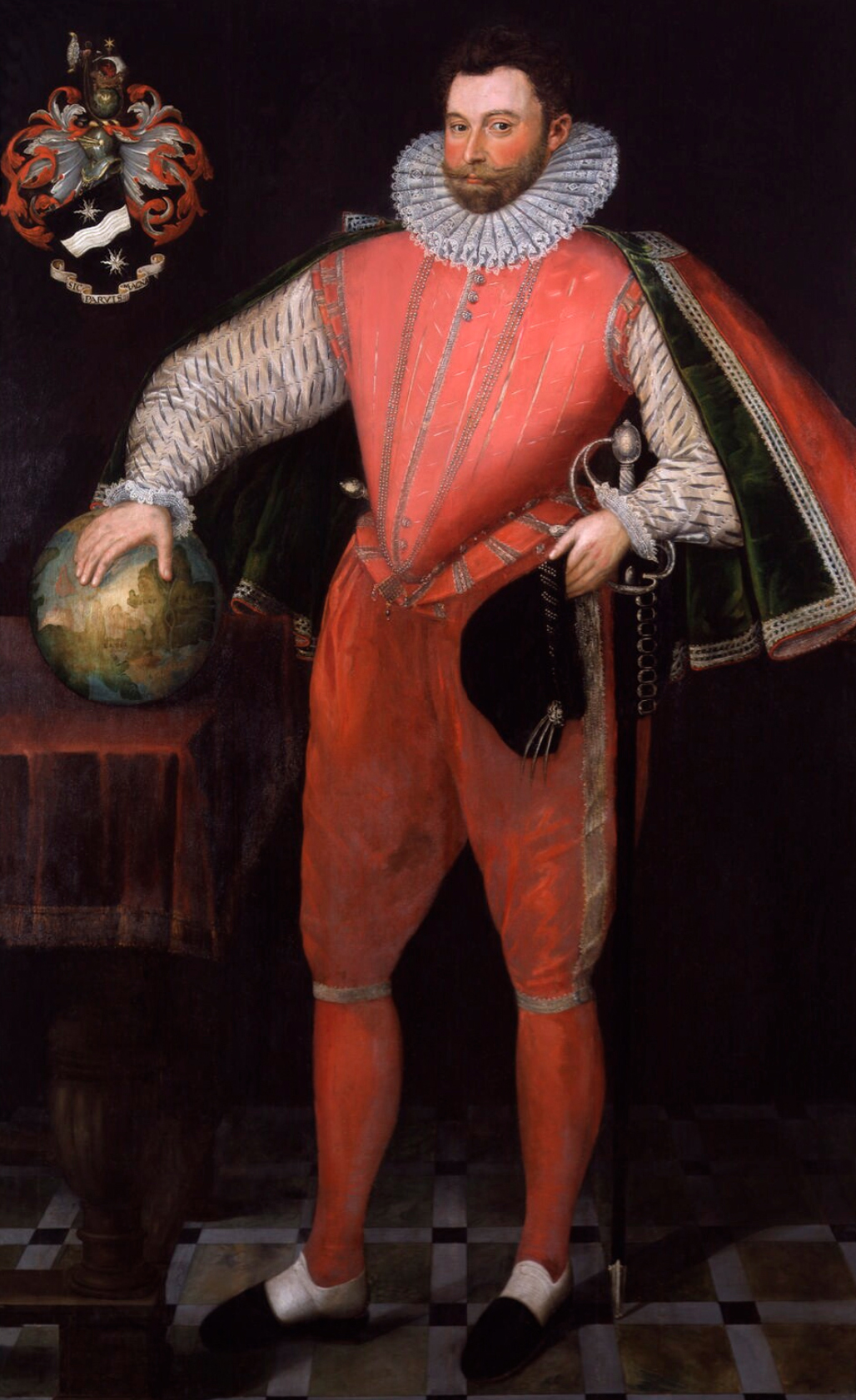
Sir Francis Drake visited the islands four times; its main channel was named in his honor

Drake returned in 1585, and is reported to have anchored in North Sound on Virgin Gorda prior to his tactically brilliant attack on Santo Domingo. Drake returned for the final time in 1595 on his last voyage, during which he died. The main channel in the British Virgin Islands was named in his honor.

In 1598, George Clifford, 3rd Earl of Cumberland, is reported to have used the islands as a staging ground for his later attack on La Fortaleza in Puerto Rico, during conflicts between England and Spain.

English (and Scottish) King James I granted a patent to James Hay, 1st Earl of Carlisle, for Tortola, as well as "Angilla, Semrera (Sombrero island) & Enegada". Carlisle also received letters of patent for Barbados, St. Kitts and "all the Caribees" in 1627 (the "Carlisle proprietorship"). He died shortly after, but his son, the 2nd Earl of Carlisle, leased the patents to Lord Willoughby for 21 years in 1647. Neither ever attempted to settle the northern islands.

=== First Dutch settlements ===
Dutch privateer Joost van Dyk organized the first permanent settlements in the Territory in Soper's Hole, on the west end of Tortola. By 1615, van Dyk's settlement was recorded in contemporary Spanish records, which noted its recent expansion. He traded with Spanish colonists in Puerto Rico and farmed cotton and tobacco.

Some sources suggest that the first settlements in the Virgin Islands were by the Spanish, who mined copper at the copper mine on Virgin Gorda. No archaeological evidence supports any settlement by the Spanish in the islands, nor any mining of copper on Virgin Gorda prior to the 19th century.

By 1625, van Dyk was recognized by the Dutch West India Company as the private "Patron" of Tortola and had moved his operations to Road Town. During the same year, van Dyk lent some limited (non-military) support to the Dutch admiral Boudewijn Hendricksz, who sacked San Juan, Puerto Rico. In September 1625, in retaliation, the Spanish led a full assault on the island of Tortola, laying waste to its defenses and destroying its embryonic settlements. Joost van Dyk escaped to the island that would later bear his name, and sheltered there from the Spanish. He later moved to the island of St. Thomas until the Spanish gave up and returned to Puerto Rico.

Notwithstanding Spanish hostility, the Dutch West India Company considered the Virgin Islands to have a significant strategic value, as they were located approximately halfway between the Dutch colonies in South America (now Suriname) and the most important Dutch settlement in North America, New Amsterdam (now New York City). The Dutch built large stone warehouses at Freebottom, near Port Purcell (just east of Road Town), to facilitate exchanges of cargo between North and South America.

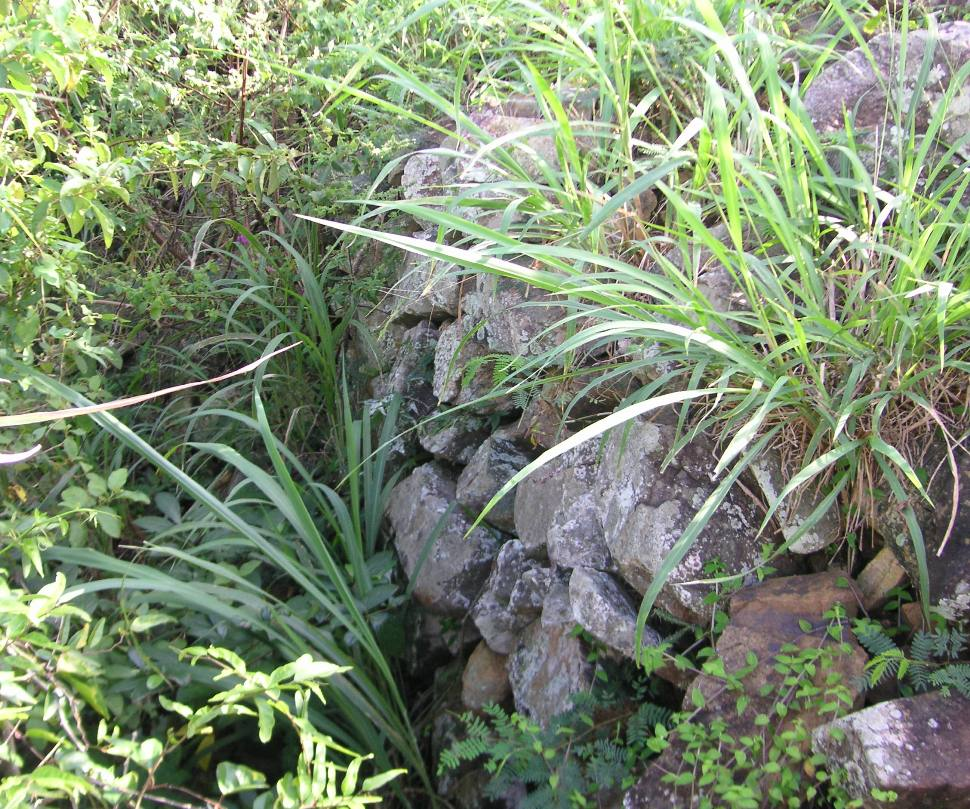
The remains of Fort Charlotte, built on an earlier lookout post erected by the Dutch

At this time, the Dutch settlers erected some small earthworks and a three-cannon fort above the warehouse, on the hill. This was the site where the English later built Fort George. The Dutch also constructed a wooden stockade for a lookout post above Road Town. This site was later developed as Fort Charlotte. They stationed troops at the Spanish "dojon" near Pockwood Pond, later to be known as Fort Purcell. In the 21st century, it is usually called "the Dungeon".

In 1631, the Dutch West India Company expressed an interest in the rumors of copper on Virgin Gorda, and a settlement was set up on that island, which came to be known as "Little Dyk's" (now known as Little Dix).

In 1640, Spain attacked Tortola in an assault led by Captain Lopez. The Spanish attacked again in 1646 and 1647, led by Captain Francisco Vincente Duran. The Spanish anchored a warship in Soper's Hole at West End and landed men ashore. They sent another warship to blockade Road Harbour. After a team of scouts returned a safe report, the Spanish landed more men and attacked Fort Purcell overland by foot. They massacred the Dutch, and next attacked Road Town, killing all inhabitants and destroying the settlement. They did not bother with the smaller settlements further up the coast in Baugher's Bay or on Virgin Gorda.

=== Decline of the Dutch West India Company ===
The Dutch settlements did not return a profit. Evidence suggests that the Dutch settlers spent most of their time more profitably engaged in privateering than in trading. The lack of prosperity of the territory mirrored the lack of commercial success of the Dutch West India Company as a whole.

The Company changed its policy. It sought to cede islands such as Tortola and Virgin Gorda to private persons for settlement, and to establish depots to support the slave trade in the Caribbean, as the Company were importing slaves from Africa. The island of Tortola was sold to Willem Hunthum at some point in the 1650s, at which time the Dutch West India Company's interest in the Territory effectively ended. In 1665, the Dutch settlers on Tortola were attacked by a British privateer, John Wentworth; he captured 67 slaves and took them to Bermuda. The record of his prize is the first documentation of slaves being held in the Territory.

In 1666, a report to the Company stated that some of the Dutch settlers had been driven out by an influx of British "brigands and pirates", although numerous Dutch remained.

== 1672: British colonisation ==
England took control of the British Virgin Islands in 1672, at the outbreak of the Third Anglo-Dutch War, and have retained influence since. The Dutch averred that in 1672 Willem Hunthum put Tortola under the protection of Colonel Sir William Stapleton, the English Governor-General of the Leeward Islands. Stapleton reported that he had "captured" the Territory shortly after the outbreak of war.

Colonel William Burt was dispatched to Tortola and took control of the island no later than 13 July 1672 (when Stapleton reported the conquest to the Council of Trade). Burt did not have sufficient men to occupy the Territory, but before leaving the island, he destroyed the Dutch forts and removed all their cannons to St. Kitts.

By the Treaty of Westminster of 1674, the war was ended, and provision was made for mutual restoration of all territorial conquests during the war. The Treaty provided the Dutch with the right to resume possession of the islands, but by then the Dutch were at war with the French, and fear of a French attack prevented their immediate restoration. Although the possessions were not considered valuable, for strategic reasons the British became reluctant to surrender them, and after prolonged discussions, orders were issued to Stapleton in June 1677 to retain possession of Tortola and the surrounding islands.

In 1678, the Franco-Dutch War ended, and the Dutch returned their attention to Tortola, although it was not until 1684 that the Dutch ambassador, Arnout van Citters, formally requested the return of Tortola. However, he did not do so on the basis of the Treaty of Westminster, but instead based the claim on the private rights of the widow of Willem Hunthum. He asserted that the island was not a conquest, but had been entrusted to the British. The ambassador provided a letter from Stapleton promising to return the island.

At this time (1686), Stapleton had completed his term of office and was en route back to Britain. The Dutch were told Stapleton would be asked to explain the discrepancy between his assertion of having conquered the island, and the correspondence signed by him indicating a promise to return it, after which a decision would be made. Unfortunately, Stapleton traveled first to France to recover his health, where he died. Cognisant that other Caribbean territories which had been captured from the Dutch during the war had already been restored, in August 1686 the Dutch ambassador was advised by the British that Tortola would be restored, and instructions to that effect were sent to Sir Nathaniel Johnson, the new Governor of the Leeward Islands.

But Tortola was never actually returned to the Dutch. Part of the problem was that Johnson's orders were to restore the island to such person or persons who have "sufficient procuration or authority to receive the same..." However, most of the former Dutch colonists had now departed, having lost hope of restoration. Certainly there was no official representation of the Dutch monarchy or any other organ of government. In the event, Johnson did nothing.

In November 1696, a subsequent claim was made to the island by Sir Peter van Bell, the agent of Sir Joseph Shepheard, a Rotterdam merchant, who claimed to have purchased Tortola on 21 June 1695, for 3,500 guilders. Shepheard was from the Margraviate of Brandenburg, and the prospect of Tortola coming under Brandenburger control did not sit well in Westminster. The Brandenburg claim was dismissed by the British on the grounds that Stapleton had conquered rather than been entrusted with Tortola. The now common delaying tactic of forwarding all correspondence to Governor Codrington for comment was employed. Codrington readily appreciated the risks of a Brandenburg trading outpost on Tortola, as such an outpost already existed on nearby St. Thomas. The Brandenburgers had previously set up an outpost for trading slaves on Peter Island in 1690, which they had abandoned, and they were not considered welcome. At the time they had an outpost on St. Thomas, but they engaged in no agriculture, and only participated in the trading of slaves. Negotiations became more intense, and the British re-asserted the right of conquest and also (wrongly, but apparently honestly) claimed to have first discovered Tortola. During the negotiations, the British also became aware of two older historical claims, the 1628 patent granted to the Earl of Carlisle (which was inconsistent with Hunthum's title being sold to him by the Dutch West India company), and an order of the King in 1694 to prevent foreign settlement in the Virgin Islands. In February 1698, Codrington was told to regard the earlier 1694 orders as final, and the British entertained no further claims to the islands.

=== Geographical limits of the territory ===
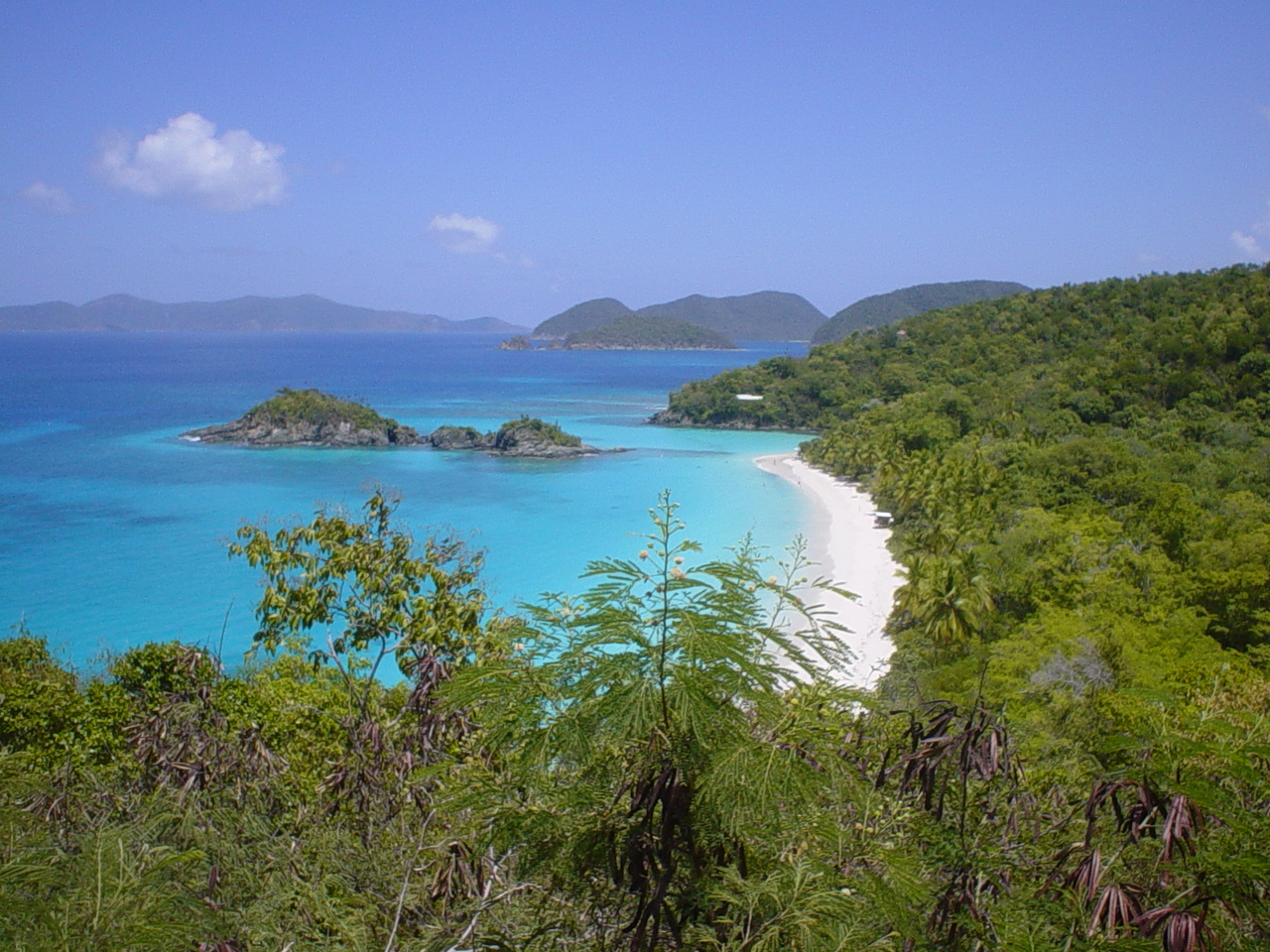
St. John, claimed by the British but never settled. They effectively abandoned their claim to the island in 1718.

Although the islands which presently form the British Virgin Islands have been under British control since 1672, a number of other islands came under the control of the British Crown (some more than once) during the subsequent period, but no longer form part of the Territory. At the time the British took control of the territory, the following islands were considered part of the Virgin Islands.

- St. Thomas. The British initially claimed St. Thomas (and St. John as well), but in 1717, the Danish disputed their claim to those islands. In contrast to the long dispute over ownership of Tortola, the dispute over St. Thomas was settled readily with a year. The Danish claim was strong; they had the benefit of the Treaty of Alliance and Commerce of 1670 between Britain and Denmark, which led to the founding of the Danish West India Company in 1671 which its charter permitted it to take possession of and occupy the two islands. On 25 May 1672, the Danes took possession of St. Thomas, and discovered it to have been abandoned by the British settlers some weeks earlier. The British could scarcely object to the Danes retaining the island.
- St. John. However, no sooner than the dispute over St. Thomas settled, than acrimony flared up again over St. John, when the Danes purported to settle it on 23 March 1718. The reaction of Walter Hamilton, Governor of the Leeward Islands, was immediate. He dispatched HMS Scarborough to the island. A period of fraught negotiations followed, but ultimately the Danes refused to quit St. John, and the British declined to use force to seize it. Truthfully, the British were less concerned about St. John than about St. Croix, which they thought that the Danes would eventually covet as well.
- St. Croix (or St. Cruz, as it was known at the time). The British fears proved to be well founded. In 1729, a claim was made to St. Croix by the Danes who (in an ironic twist) claimed it had been sold to them by the French. St. Croix had been settled at an uncertain point over a century before by settlers from a number of different European nations, but in 1645 violence had flared up between them, and the English governor was murdered. The English summarily expelled the Dutch, and the French, at their own request, were removed to Guadeloupe, leaving the British in sole control of the island. But in 1650, the Spanish invaded from Puerto Rico and the British surrendered the island. Later in the same year, the Dutch had sought to return to St. Croix, believing that the Spanish would by then have returned to Puerto Rico, but when they arrived the Spanish were still there, and the Dutch were all killed or captured. The Governor General of the French Caribbean colonies then subsequently mounted an attack on the island at his own expense and drove out the Spanish, but he was unable to establish a colony, and surrendered the title to the island to the Grand Master of the Order of Malta in 1653. In 1665, St. Croix reverted by purchase to the French West India Company, and upon the Company's collapse in 1674, the King of France claimed it as part of his dominions, although the island was subsequently ordered to be abandoned as an economic failure - the date of abandoning would later be hotly disputed. In May 1733, the French purported to sell the island to the Danish West India Company. If the French had only abandoned it in 1695 (as they asserted), it was French at the time of the Treaty. If the French had abandoned the island in 1671 (as the British claimed), then under the 1686 Treaty, St. Croix would be peaceably in British possession. In the end, the French had documents to support their claim, and the British did not, and so the Council of Trade admitted that "upon the whole we must submit... whether it may be proper to advise His Majesty to insist any longer upon a title so weakly supported." The British thereafter ceased to resist the French sale of the island to the Danes.

Britain would actually conquer St. Thomas, St. John, and St. Croix in March 1801 through the Napoleonic wars, but they restored them by the Treaty of Amiens in March 1802. They were then re-taken in December 1807, but were restored again by the Treaty of Paris of 1815. Thereafter, they would remain under Danish control until 1917 when they were sold to the U.S.A. for US$25 million, and were later renamed the "U.S. Virgin Islands".

- Vieques (or Crab Island, as the British referred to it). Vieques was periodically settled by the British, but on each occasion they were driven off by Spanish soldiers from nearby Puerto Rico. In the early 18th century, the Colonial authorities ordered the removal of British settlers on Vieques and re-settled them on St. Kitts. Ironically enough, a century later after emancipation a number of former slaves would go and seek work on Vieques as free men of colour, notwithstanding that Vieques was still a slave owning society.

Relationships with the Danes were strained from the outset. The Danes continuously resorted to nearby islands for timber, clearly violating British sovereignty. British ships which foundered in St. Thomas was subject to extortionate levy for salvage. Further, St. Thomas became a base for pirates and privateers which the Danish Governor either could not or would not stop. During the War of the Spanish Succession the Danes supported the French colonies, and allowed the French to sell British ships seized as prizes in Charlotte Amalie. No doubt the British invasions in the early 19th century did not help relations, and in later years smuggling and illegal sales of slaves by St. Thomians would frustrate British authorities.

=== Law and order ===
Even after British control of the Territory became complete, population infiltration was slow. Settlers lived in fear of possible Spanish attack, and there was the constant possibility that diplomatic efforts might fail and the Territory might revert to an overseas power (as happened in St. Croix). Spanish raids in 1685 and ongoing negotiations between the Dutch and the British over the fate of the islands led to them being virtually abandoned; from 1685 to 1690 the population of the Territory was reduced to two - a Mr Jonathan Turner and his wife. In 1690, there was a relative explosion in the population, which had swollen to fourteen. By 1696, it was up to fifty.

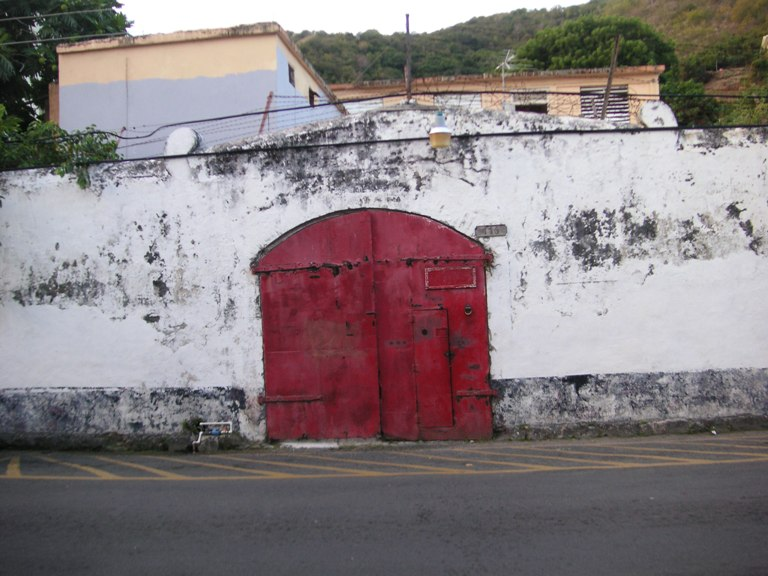
The old HM Prison in Road Town. Used up until 1996, it was built on the site of an earlier prison in the mid 19th century

From 1678, the British appointed a deputy-governor for the Territory (initially for the Territory and Saba and St. Eustatius, until the latter two islands were returned to the Dutch). The role was somewhat vague, and had no legislative, executory or judicial powers attached to it. The deputy-governor was encouraged to appoint a local governor beneath him, though it was common complaint being unable "to gett one that's tolerable fitt amongst them to take the command upon them." In 1709, Governor Parke observed that "they live like wild people without law or Government, and have neither Divine nor Lawyer amongst them..."

It was not until 1773 that the Virgin Islands actually had its own legislature.

Early attempts to establish a legislature and organs of government in the Territory are considered failures. The uncertainty of tenure and slightly ambivalent official British attitude to the fate of the Territory influenced the early population - for many years only debtors from other islands, pirates and those fleeing the law were prepared to undertake the risk of settling in the Virgin Islands. Most references to the islands from occasional visitors comment on the lack of law and order and the lack of religiosity of the inhabitants.

The Territory was granted a Legislative Assembly on 27 January 1774, however, it took a full further decade for a constitutional framework to be settled. Part of the problem was that the islands were so thinly populated, it was almost impossible to constitute the organs of government. In 1778, George Suckling arrived in the Territory to take up his position as Chief Justice of the Territory. In the event, a court was not actually established until the Court Bill was passed in 1783, but even then the vested interests ensured that Suckling could still not take up his position, and the islands had a court but no judge. Suckling finally left the islands without ever taking up his post (or ever being paid) on 2 May 1788, impoverished and embittered, due to the machinations of local interests which were fearful of the recourse of their creditors if a court was to be established. Suckling was forthright in expressing his views on the state of law and order in the Territory - he described the residents of Tortola as "in a state of lawless ferment. Life, liberty, and property were hourly exposed to the insults and depredations of the riotous and lawless. The authority of His Majesty's Council, as conservators of the peace, was defied and ridiculed... The island presented a shocking state of anarchy; miserable indeed, and disgraceful to government, not to be equaled in any other of His Majesty's dominions, or perhaps in any civilized country in the world."

Almost 100 years after Governor Parke had expressed his views, one of his successors would speak in similar terms. On his appointment in 1810, Governor Hugh Elliot remarked on "the state of irritation, nay, I had almost said, of anarchy, in which I have found this Colony ..." Writer Howard, an agent selling a distressed cargo of slaves from a shipwreck in Tortola in 1803 wrote that "Tortola is well nigh the most miserable, worst-inhabited spot in all the British possessions... this unhealthy part of the globe appears overstocked with each description of people except honest ones."

=== Quaker settlement ===
Although short in both duration and number, the Quaker settlement in the British Virgin Islands from 1727 to 1768 played an important part in the history of the Territory for two reasons. Firstly, the trenchant opposition of the Quakers to slavery had a contributing effect to the improvements in the treatment of slaves within the Territory (the exceptional case of Arthur William Hodge notwithstanding) compared to other Caribbean islands, and to the large number of free blacks within the islands. Secondly, for such a small community, a large number of famous historical figures came from that small community, including John C. Lettsome, William Thornton, Samuel Nottingham and Richard Humphreys. There are some vague assertions that Arthur Penn, brother of the more famous William Penn, also formed part of the Quaker community of the British Virgin Islands for a time. However, this seems unlikely as the dates of his lifetime do not fit easily within the time frame of the Quaker community in the British Virgin Islands, and as Quaker history is generally very well documented, it is unlikely that an expedition by a member of such a famous family would go unnoticed.

=== Fortification ===
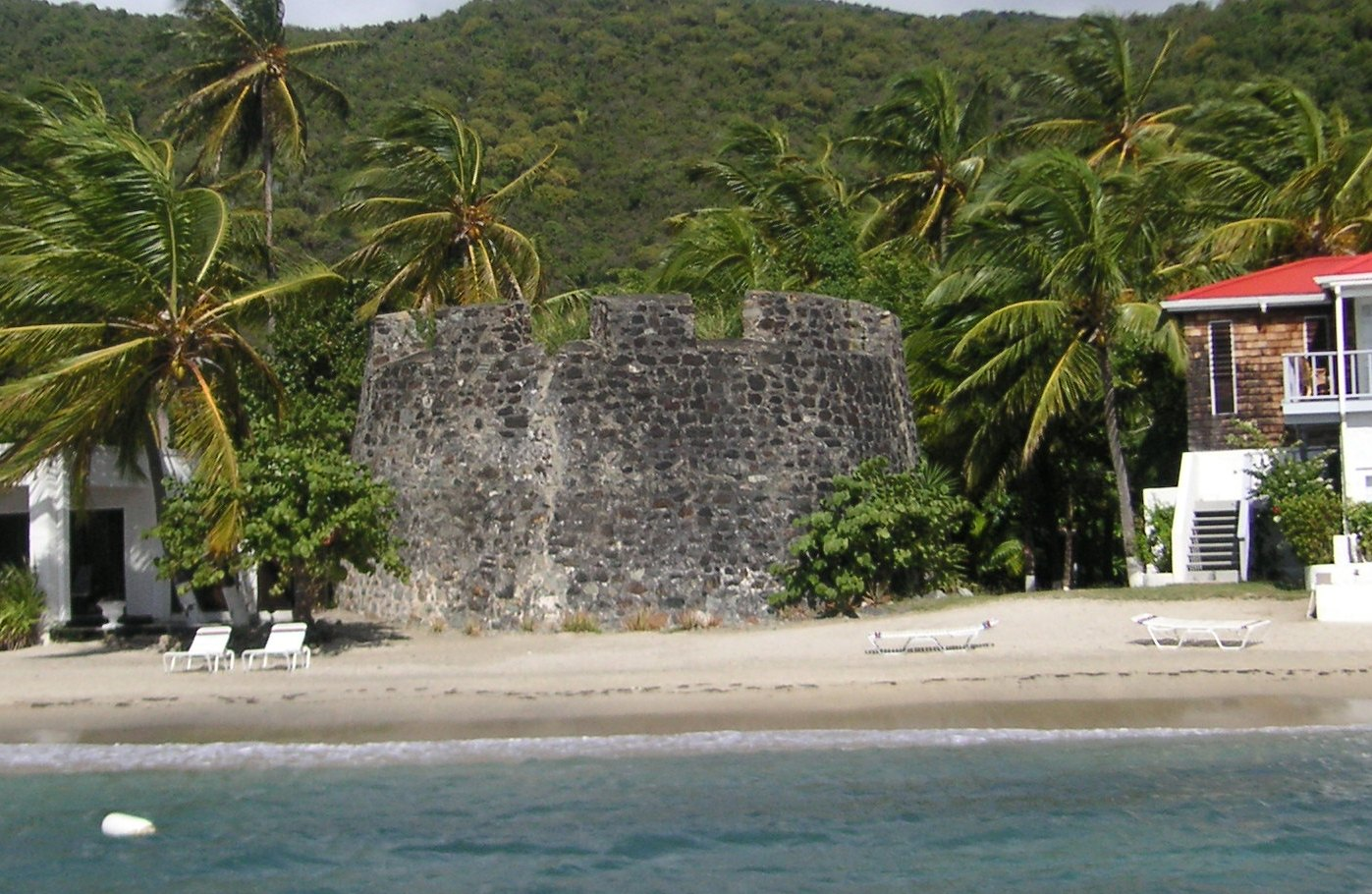
Fort Recovery, a traditional tower fort.

Between 1760 and 1800, the British significantly upgraded the defences of the Territory. Usually building upon earlier Dutch fortifications, new structures armed with cannons were erected at Fort Charlotte, Fort George, Fort Burt, Fort Recovery, and a new fort that was built in the centre of Road Town which came to be known as the Road Town Fort. As was common at the time, plantation owners were expected to fortify their own holdings, and Fort Purcell and Fort Hodge were erected on this basis.

== Slave economy ==
In common with most Caribbean countries, slavery in the British Virgin Islands forms a major part of the history of the Territory. One commentator has gone so far as to say: "One of the most important aspects of the History of the British Virgin Islands is slavery."

As Tortola, and to a lesser extent Virgin Gorda, came to be settled by plantation owners, slave labour became economically essential, and there was an exponential growth in the slave population during the 18th century. In 1717 there were 547 black people in the Territory (all of whom were assumed to be slaves); by 1724, there were 1,430; and 1756, there were 6,121. The increase in slaves held in the Territory is, to a large degree, consistent with development of the economy of the British Virgin Islands at the time.

=== Slave revolts ===
Uprisings in the Territory were common, as they were elsewhere in the Caribbean. The first notable uprising in the British Virgin Islands occurred in 1790, and centred on the estates of Isaac Pickering. It was quickly put down, and the ring leaders were executed. The revolt was sparked by the rumour that freedom had been granted to slaves in England, but that the planters were withholding knowledge of it. The same rumour would also later spark subsequent revolts.

Subsequent rebellions also occurred in 1823, 1827, and 1830, although in each case they were quickly put down.

Probably the most significant slave insurrection occurred in 1831 when a plot was uncovered to kill all of the white males in the Territory and to escape to Haiti (which was at the time the only free black republic in the world) by boat with all of the white females. Although the plot does not appear to have been especially well formulated, it caused widespread panic, and military assistance was drafted in from St. Thomas. A number of the plotters (or accused plotters) were executed.

It is perhaps unsurprising that the incidence of slave revolts increased sharply after 1822. In 1807, the trade in slaves was abolished. Although the existing slaves were forced to continue their servitude, the Royal Navy patrolled the Atlantic, capturing slave ships, and freeing slave cargoes. Starting in 1808, hundreds of freed Africans were deposited on Tortola by the Navy who, after serving a 14 year "apprenticeship", were then absolutely free. Naturally, seeing free Africans in the Territory created enormous resentment and jealousy amongst the existing slave population, who understandably felt this to be enormously unjust.

== 1834: Emancipation ==
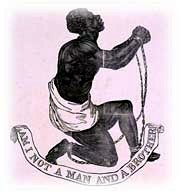
Emancipation pamphlet, circa 1815

The abolition of slavery occurred on 1 August 1834, and to this day it is celebrated by a three-day public holiday on the first Monday, Tuesday and Wednesday in August in the British Virgin Islands. The original emancipation proclamation hangs in the High Court. However, the abolition of slavery was not the single defining event that it is sometimes supposed to have been. Emancipation freed a total of 5,792 slaves in the Territory, but at the time of abolition, there were already a considerable number of free blacks in the Territory, possibly as many as 2,000. Furthermore, the effect of abolition was gradual; the freed slaves were not absolutely manumitted, but instead entered a form of forced apprenticeship which lasted four years for house slaves and six years for field slaves. The terms of the forced apprenticeship required them to provide 45 hours unpaid labour a week to their former masters, and prohibited them from leaving their residence without the masters permission. The effect, deliberately, was to phase out reliance on slave labour rather than end it with a bang. The Council would later legislate to reduce this period to four years for all slaves to quell rising dissent amongst the field slaves.

Joseph John Gurney, a Quaker, wrote in his Familiar Letters to Henry Clay of Kentucky that the plantation owners in Tortola were "decidedly saving money by the substitution of free labor on moderate wages, for the deadweight of slavery".

In practice, the economics of the abolition are difficult to quantify. Undeniably, the original slave owners suffered a huge capital loss. Although they received £72,940 from the British Government in compensation, this was only a fraction of the true economic value of the manumitted slaves. In terms of net cash flow, whilst the slave owners lost the right to "free" slave labour, they now no longer had to pay to house, clothe, and provide medical attention for their former slaves, which in some cases almost balanced out. The former slaves now usually worked for the same masters, but instead received small wages, out of which they had to pay for the expenses formerly borne by their masters. However, some former slaves managed to amass savings, which clearly demonstrates that in net terms the slave owners were less well off in income terms as well as capital as a result of abolition.

=== Decline of the sugar industry ===
An often held view is that the economy of the British Virgin Islands deteriorated considerably after the abolition of slavery. Whilst this is, strictly speaking, true, it also disguises the fact that the decline had several different causes. In 1834 the Territory was an agricultural economy with two main crops: sugarcane and cotton. Of the two, sugar was the considerably more lucrative export.

Shortly after the abolition of slavery the Territory was rocked by a series of hurricanes. At the time, there was no accurate method of forecasting hurricanes, and their effect was devastating. A particularly devastating hurricane struck in 1837, which was reported to have completed destroyed 17 of the Territory's sugar works. Further hurricanes hit in 1842 and 1852. Two more struck in 1867 and 1871. The island also suffered severe drought between 1837 and 1847, which made sugar plantations almost impossible to sustain.

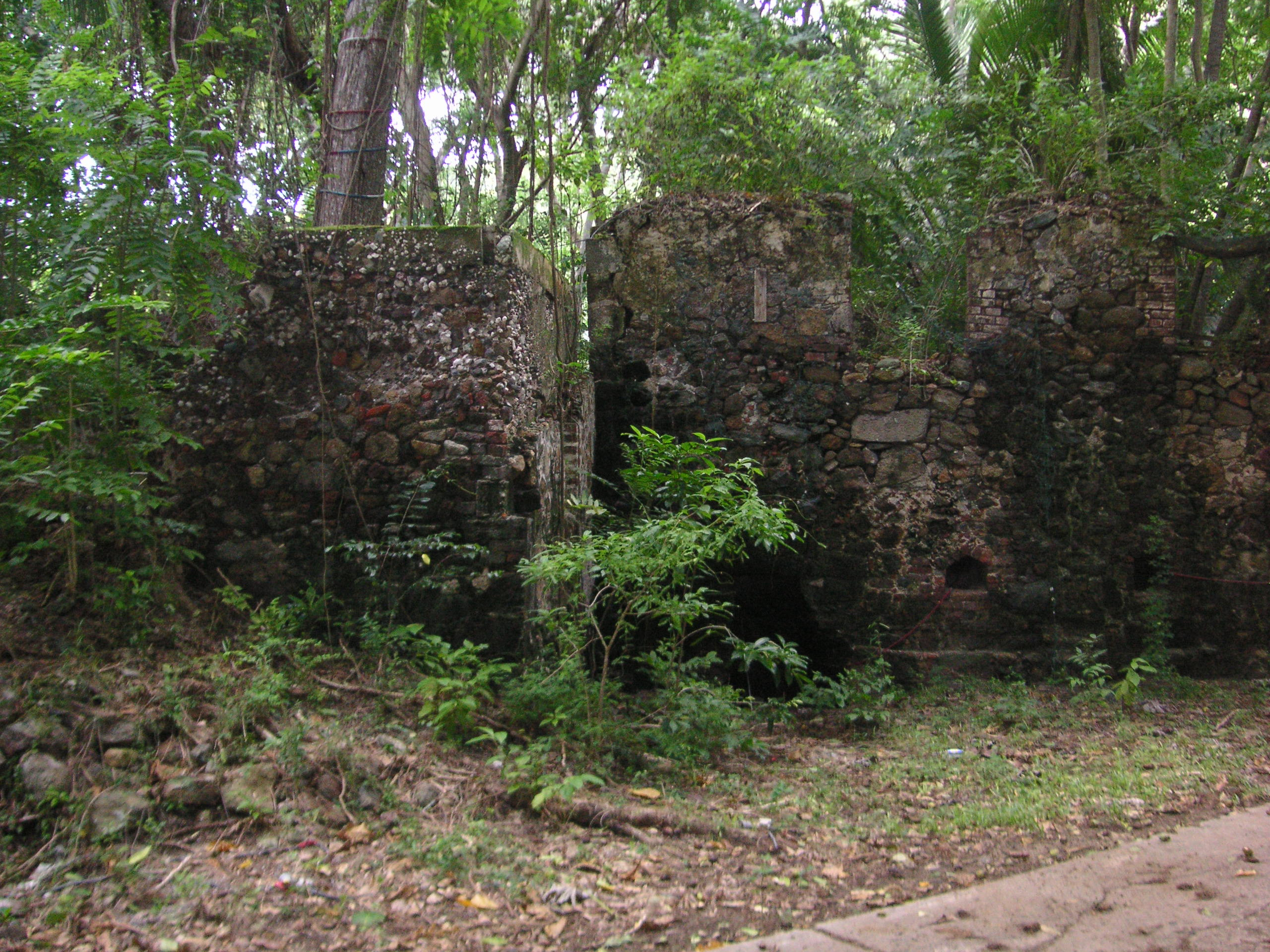
An abandoned and ruined sugar mill in Brewer's Bay.

To compound these miseries, in 1846 the United Kingdom passed the Sugar Duties Act 1846 to equalise duties on sugar grown in the colonies. Removing market distortions had the net effect of making prices fall, a further blow to plantations in the British Virgin Islands.

In 1846, the commercial and trading firm of Reid, Irving & Co. collapsed. The firm had 10 sugar estates in the British Virgin Islands and employed 1,150 people. But the actual economic effect of its failure was much wider; the company also acted as a de facto bank in the Territory, allowing advances to be drawn on the company as credit. Further, the company had represented the only remaining direct line of communication to the United Kingdom; after its collapse, mail had to be sent via St. Thomas and Copenhagen.

By 1848, Edward Hay Drummond Hay, the President of the British Virgin Islands, reported that: "there are now no properties in the Virgin Islands whose holders are not embarrassed for want of capital or credit sufficient to enable them to carry on the simplest method of cultivation effectively."

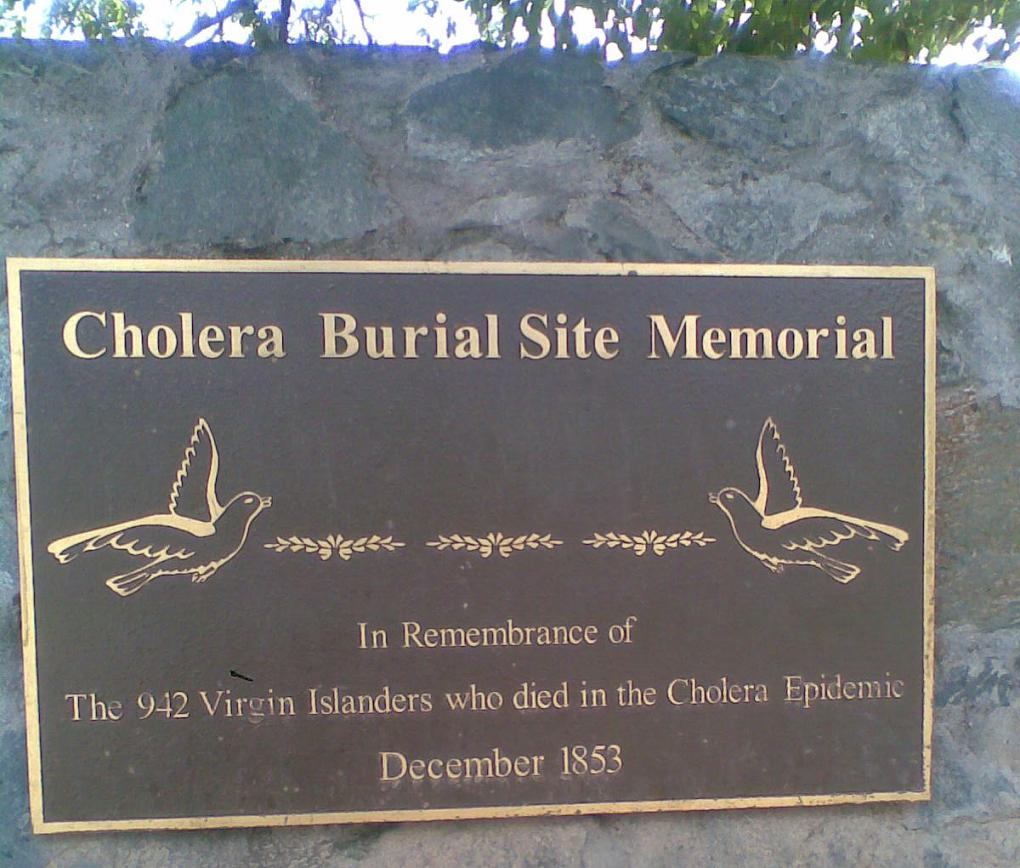
Cholera memorial in Long Bush, Road Town

In December 1853 there was a disastrous outbreak of cholera in the Territory, which killed nearly 15% of the population. This was followed by an outbreak of smallpox in Tortola and Jost Van Dyke in 1861 which caused a further 33 deaths.

Up until 1845, the value of sugar exported from the Territory varied, but averaged around £10,000 per annum over the preceding ten years. With the exception of 1847 (an unusually good year), the average for the subsequent 10 years was under £3,000. By 1852, it had fallen below £1,000 and would never recover.

Although this was terrible news for the islands as a whole, as Isaac Dookhan has pointed out, this did mean that the value of land plummeted sharply, and enabled the newly free black community to purchase land where otherwise it might not have been able to do so. It also created the basis for the future peasant agricultural economy of the British Virgin Islands.

=== Insurrection ===
Soon after emancipation, the newly freed black population of the British Virgin Islands started to become increasingly disenchanted that freedom had not brought the prosperity that they had hoped for. Economic decline had led to increased tax burdens, which became a source of general discontent, for former slaves and other residents of the Territory alike.

In 1848, a major disturbance occurred in the Territory. The causes of the disturbance were several. A revolt of slaves was occurring in St. Croix, which increased the general fervour in the islands, but the free population of Tortola were much more concerned with two other grievances: the appointment of public officials, and the crackdown on smuggling. Although Tortola had sixteen coloured public officials, all except one were "foreigners" from outside the Territory. During the period of economic decline, smuggling had been one of the few lucrative sources of employment, and recent laws which imposed stringent financial penalties (with hard labour for non-payment) were unpopular. The anger was directed against the magistrates by the small shop keepers, and they concentrated their attack on the stipendiary magistrate, Isidore Dyett. However, Dyett was popular with the rural population, who respected him for protecting them from unscrupulous planters. The ringleaders of the insurrection had supposed that their attack would lead to a general revolt, but their choice of Dyett as a target robbed them of popular support, and the disturbance eventually fizzled.

However, the insurrection of 1853 was a far more serious affair, and would have much graver and more lasting consequences. Arguably it was the single most defining event in the islands' history. Taxation and economics was also at the root of that disturbance. In March 1853, Robert Hawkins and Joshua Jordan, both Methodist missionaries, petitioned the Assembly to be relieved on taxes. The Assembly rejected the request, and Jordan is said to have replied "we will raise the people against you." Subsequent meetings fostered the general discontent. Then in June 1853 the legislature enacted a head tax on cattle in the Territory. Injudiciously, the tax was to come into effect on 1 August, the anniversary of emancipation. The burden of the tax would fall most heavily on the rural coloured community. There was no violent protest when the Act was passed, and it has been suggested that rioting could have been avoided if the legislature had been more circumspect in enforcing it, although the historical background suggests that insurrection was never far away, and only needed a reason to spark into life.

On 1 August 1853, a large body of rural labourers came to Road Town to protest the tax. However, instead of showing a conciliatory approach, the authorities immediately read the Riot Act, and made two arrests. Violence then erupted almost immediately. Several constables and magistrates were badly beaten, the greater part of Road Town itself was burned down, and a large number of the plantation houses were destroyed, cane fields were burned and sugar mills destroyed. Almost all of the white population fled to St. Thomas. President John Chads showed considerable personal courage, but little judgement or tact. On 2 August 1853, he met a gathering of 1,500 to 2,000 protesters, but all he would promise to do was relay their grievances before the legislature (which could not meet, as all the other members had fled). One protester was shot (the only recorded death during the disturbances themselves) which led to the continuation of the rampage. By 3 August 1853, the only white people remaining in the Territory were John Chads himself, the Collector of Customs, a Methodist missionary and the island's doctor.

The riots were eventually suppressed with military assistance from St. Thomas, and reinforcements of British troops dispatched by the Governor of the Leeward Islands from Antigua. Twenty of the ringleaders of the riots were sentenced to lengthy terms of imprisonment; three were executed.

=== "Decline and disorder" ===
The period which followed the riots of 1853 has been referred to by one historian as the period of "decline and disorder". Some commentators have suggested that the white population essentially refused to return, and the islands "went to de bush". But this is clearly an exaggeration. Whilst many whites did not return to their heavily mortgaged and now ruined estates, some did, and rebuilt. But the rebuilding required as a result of the insurrection, as well as the climate of uncertainty it created, alongside the existing poor economic conditions, created an economic depression which would take nearly a century to lift. It would in fact take a full two years before even the schools in the Territory would be able to open again.

Tensions in the Territory continued to simmer, and local unrest ran high. Exports continued to decline, and large numbers traveled abroad seeking work. In 1887, a plot for an armed rebellion was uncovered. In 1890, a dispute over smuggling led to further violence, and a Long Look resident, Christopher Flemming, emerged as a local hero simply for standing up to authority. In each case widespread damage was averted by bringing in reinforcements for the local authorities from Antigua and, in 1890, from St. Thomas.

Whilst the violence undoubtedly reflected disenchantment with the economic decline and lack of social services, it would be wrong to construe this period as a form of "Dark Ages" for the Territory. During this period there was, for the first time, a significant expansion in the islands' schools. By 1875, the Territory had 10 schools; a remarkable development in light of the complete absence of functional schools after the insurrection of 1853. This period also saw the first coloured British Virgin Islander, Fredrick Augustus Pickering, appointed as President in 1884.

Pickering stepped down in 1887, and in 1889, the title of the office was changed to Commissioner, marking a clear decrease in administrative responsibilities. Offices were also consolidated to save on salaries. The Council itself became less and less functional, and it only narrowly avoided dissolution by appointing two popular local figures, Joseph Romney and Pickering.

== Modern developments ==
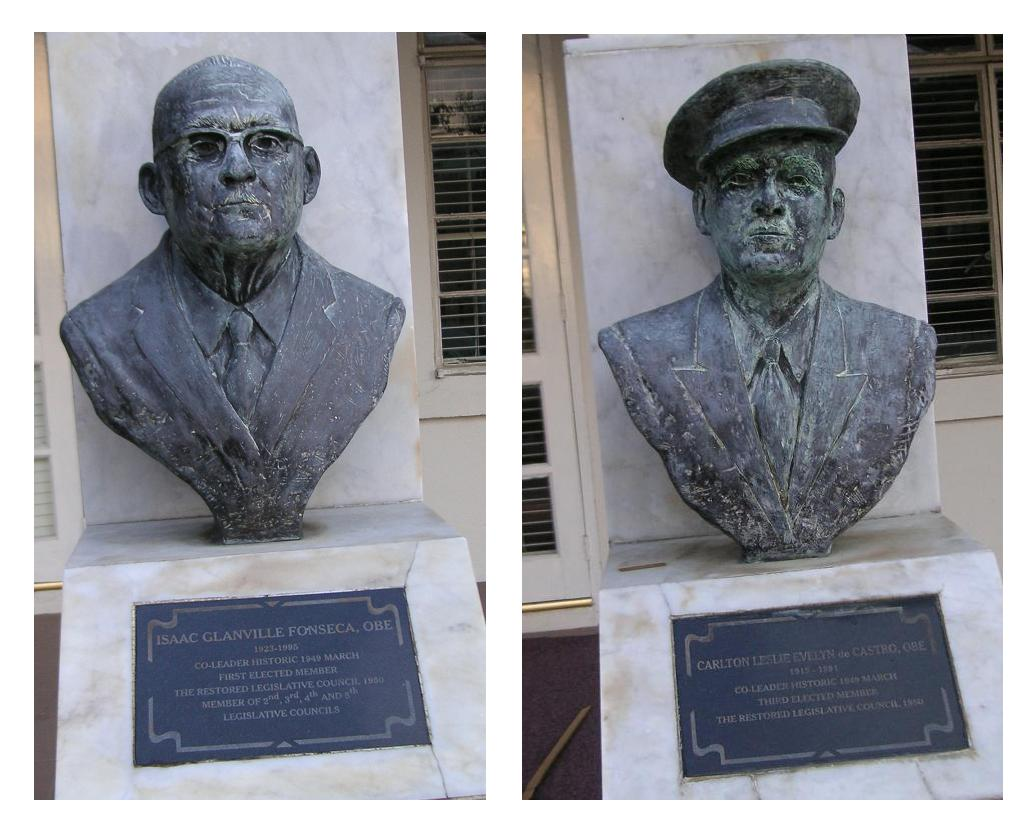
The busts of Isaac Fonseca and Carlton de Castro outside of the House of Assembly.

However, in 1901 the Legislative Council was finally formally dissolved, and the islands were then officially administered through the Governor of the Leeward Islands, who appointed a commissioner and an executive council. The territory was not remotely economically prosperous, and social services had deteriorated to the point of nearly vanishing. Emigration was extremely high, particularly to St. Thomas and to the Dominican Republic. Both concern and assistance from Britain was in very short supply, not least because of the two World Wars which were fought during this period.

In 1949 another unlikely hero emerged. Theodolph H. Faulkner was a fisherman from Anegada, who came to Tortola with his pregnant wife. He had a disagreement with the medical officer, and he went straight to the marketplace and for several nights criticised the government with mounting passion. His oratory struck a chord, and a movement started. Led by community leaders such as Isaac Fonseca and Carlton de Castro, on 24 November 1949 a throng of over 1,500 British Virgin Islanders marched on the commissioner's office and presented their grievances. They presented a petition which commenced:

"We are imbued with a desire to decide our local affairs with our own selves. We have outgrown that undesirable stage where one official, or an official clique, makes decisions for us... We are seeking the privilege of deciding how our monies are spent and what shall be our Presidential laws and policies."

=== 1950 – Self government ===
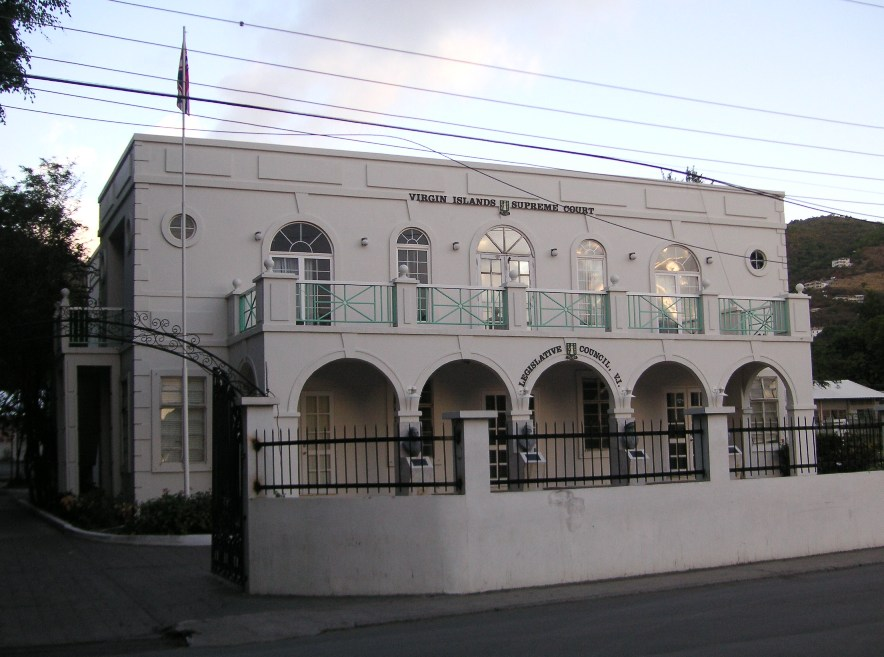
The Legislative Council building in Road Town, erected about sixty yards from the market where Faulker roused the crowds.

As a result of the demonstrations the previous year, the Legislative Council was reinstituted by the British government in 1950 under a new constitution. The reformation of the Legislative Council is often left as a footnote in the territory's history – a mere part of the process that led to the more fundamental constitutional government in 1967. The 1950 constitution was in fact always envisaged as a temporary measure (it was famously described by McWelling Todman QC as “an instrument minimal in its intent and its effect”). But, having been denied any form of democratic control for nearly 50 years, the new council did not sit idly by. In 1951 external capital was brought in to assist farmers from the Colonial Welfare and Development office. In 1953 the Hotel Aid Act was enacted to boost the nascent tourism industry. Up until 1958 the territory had only 12 miles of motorable roads; over the next 12 years the road system was vastly improved, linking West End to the East End of Tortola, and joining Tortola to Beef Island by a new bridge. The Beef Island airport (now renamed after Terrance B. Lettsome) was built shortly thereafter.

External events also played a factor. In 1956 the Leeward Islands Federation was abolished. Defederation enhanced the political status of the British Virgin Islands. Jealous of its newly acquired powers, the council declined to join the new Federation of the West Indies in 1958, a move that would later be crucial in the development of the offshore finance industry.

In 1967 a new constitution with a much greater transfer of powers was brought into effect by order-in-council, and introduced true ministerial government to the British Virgin Islands. Elections followed in 1967, and a comparatively young Lavity Stoutt was elected as the first Chief Minister of the territory.

=== Financial services ===
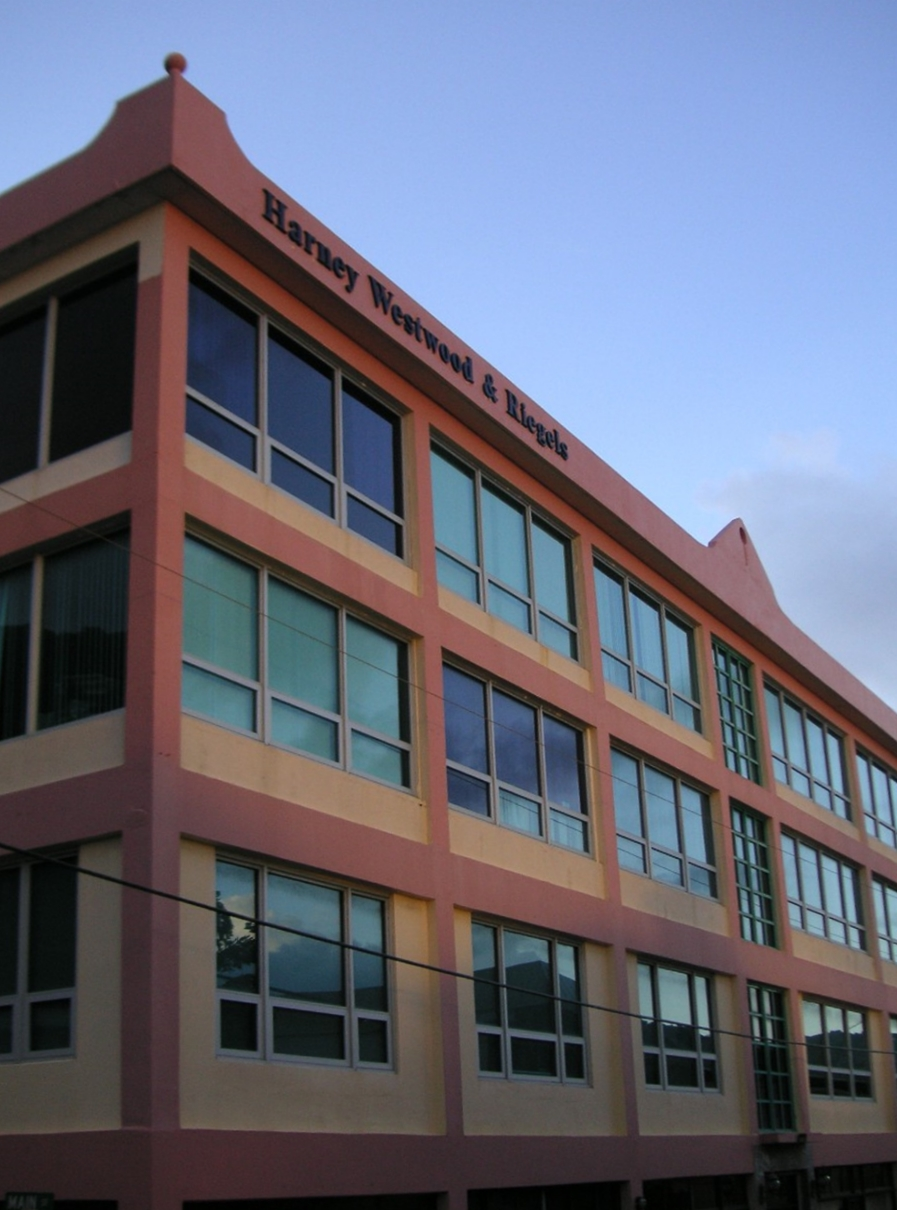
The financial services industry led to surge in growth in the Territory.

The fortunes of the Territory dramatically improved in the late twentieth century with the advent of the offshore financial services industry. Former president of the BVI's Financial Services Commission, Michael Riegels, recites the anecdote that the industry commenced on an unknown date in the 1970s when a lawyer from a firm in New York telephoned him with a proposal to incorporate a company in the British Virgin Islands to take advantage of a double taxation relief treaty with the United States. Within the space of a few years, hundreds of such companies had been incorporated.

This eventually came to the attention of the United States government, who unilaterally revoked the Treaty in 1981.

In 1984 the British Virgin Islands, trying to recapture some of the lost offshore business, enacted a new form of companies legislation, the International Business Companies Act, under which an offshore company which was exempt from local taxes could be formed. The development was only a limited success until 1991, when the United States invaded Panama to oust General Manuel Noriega. At the time Panama was one of the largest providers of offshore financial services in the world, but the business fled subsequent the invasion, and the British Virgin Islands was one of the main beneficiaries. Moreover, in 1988, Panamanian law firm Mossack Fonseca's founder Ramón Fonseca Mora advised his clients to bring their business from Panama to the British Virgin Islands.

In 2000, KPMG were commissioned by the British government to produce a report on the offshore financial industry generally, and the report indicated that nearly 41% of the offshore companies in the world were formed in the British Virgin Islands. The British Virgin Islands is now one of the world's leading offshore financial centres, and boasts one of the highest incomes per capita in the Caribbean.

In 2017, the total value of assets held in offshore companies in the British Virgin Islands was estimated at $1.5 trillion and two-fifths of company owners were based in Hong Kong and China, according to a report by Capital Economics commissioned by BVI Finance.

== Hurricane Irma ==
The islands were struck by Hurricane Irma on 6 September 2017, causing extensive damage (particularly on Tortola), as well as four deaths in the BVI. The Governor, Gus Jaspert, declared a state of emergency under the Territory's constitution, the first time this had ever happened. A state of emergency was also declared by the Caribbean Disaster Emergency Management Agency. The most significant damage was on Tortola. The UK's Foreign Secretary Boris Johnson visited Tortola on 13 September 2017 and said that he was reminded of photos of Hiroshima after it had been hit by the atom bomb.

By 8 September, the UK government sent troops with medical supplies and other aid. More troops were expected to arrive a day or two later; the ship HMS Ocean, carrying more extensive assistance, was not expected to reach the islands for another two weeks, however.

The damage to infrastructure was extensive, and restoration of public electricity to the entire territory took nearly six months. After the hurricane passed, entrepreneur Richard Branson, a resident of Necker Island (British Virgin Islands), called on the UK government to develop a massive disaster recovery plan for British islands that were damaged. That should include "both through short-term aid and long-term infrastructure spending", he said. Premier Orlando Smith also called for a comprehensive aid package to rebuild the BVI. On 10 September, British Prime Minister Theresa May pledged £32 million to the Caribbean region generally for a Hurricane relief fund.

Fourteen days after Hurricane Irma, the Territory was struck again by Hurricane Maria, also a Category 5 storm (albeit not as strong as Irma). However the eye of the storm passed to the south of Saint Croix, and the damage was minimal compared to Hurricane Irma.

In May 2018 the Immigration Department of the British Virgin Islands announced that the population of the Territory has dropped by approximately 11% since Hurricanes Irma and Maria struck the previous year.

== See also ==
- British Virgin Islands
- History of the Caribbean
- History of the United States Virgin Islands
- List of presidents of the British Virgin Islands (1741–1887)
- List of administrators of the British Virgin Islands (1887–1971)
- List of governors of the British Virgin Islands (1971–present)
