= Dutch Virgin Islands =

Dutch colony in America (1625–1680)

Coordinates: 18.437923°N 64.722272°W

Dutch Virgin Islands Nederlandse Maagdeneilanden (Dutch)
- 1625–1680
- Flag Coat of arms
- Status: Colony of the Dutch Republic
- Common languages: Dutch, Negerhollands
- Religion: Dutch Reformed
- History
  - Dutch West India Company fort established on Saint Croix: 1625
  - Dutch expelled from Saint Croix by British: 1650
  - Saint Thomas post established: 1657
  - Danish West India Company takes possession of Saint Thomas: 1672
  - Disestablished: 1680
- Currency: Gulden (WIC)
Succeeded by
British Virgin Islands; Danish West Indies

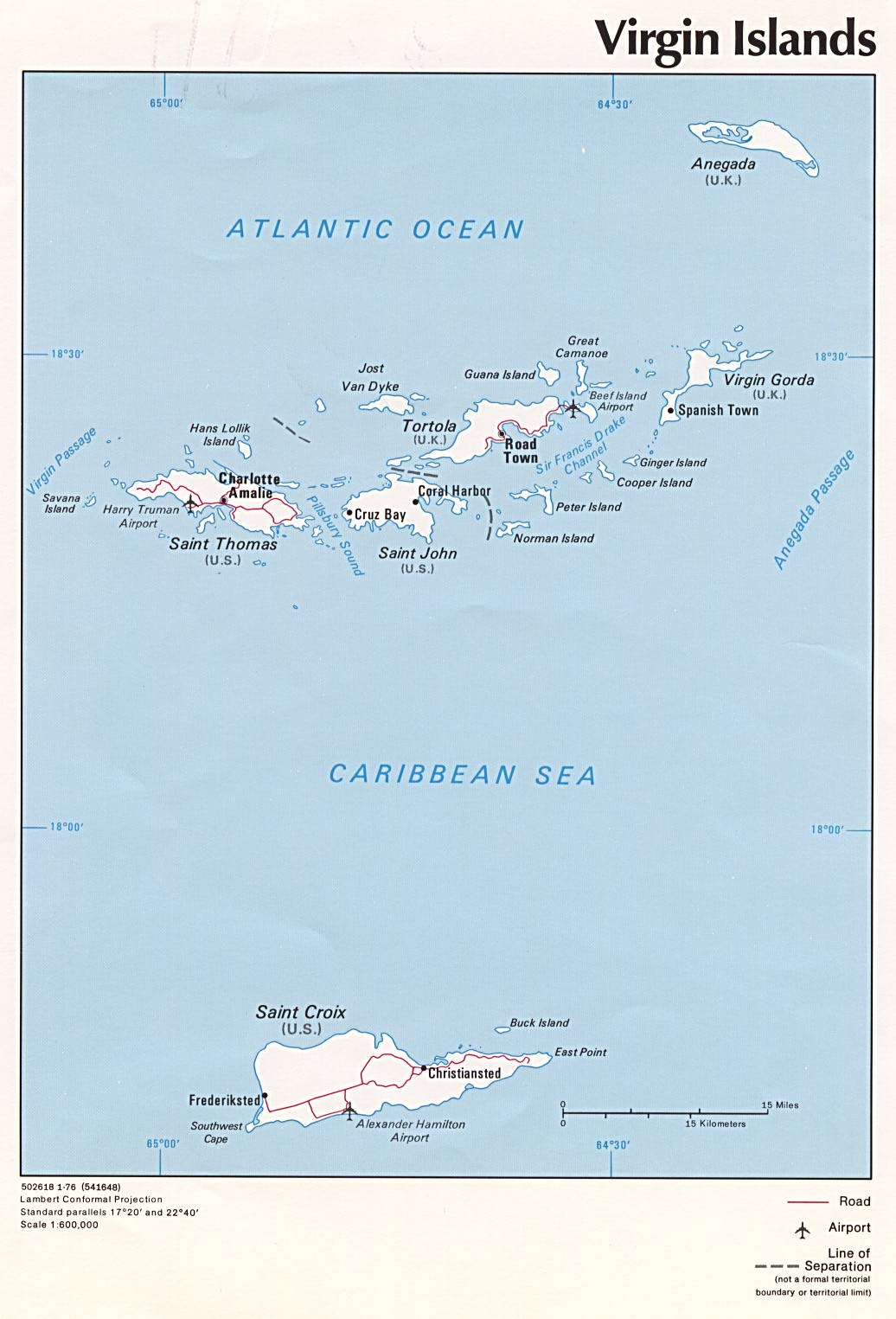
Map of the Virgin Islands

The Dutch Virgin Islands is the collective name for the enclaves that the Dutch West India Company had in the Virgin Islands. The area was ruled by a director, whose seat was not permanent. The main reason for starting a colony here was that it lay strategically between the Dutch colonies in the south (Netherlands Antilles, Suriname) and New Netherland. The Dutch West India Company was mainly affected by the competition from Denmark, England and Spain. In 1680 the remaining islands became a British colony.

== History ==
Tortola: It was a Dutch privateer named Joost van Dyk who organised the first permanent settlements in the territory in Soper's Hole, on the west end of Tortola. It is not known precisely when he first came to the territory, but by 1615 van Dyk's settlement was recorded in Spanish contemporary records, noting its recent expansion. He traded with the Spaniards in Puerto Rico and farmed cotton and tobacco.

Virgin Gorda: Some sources suggest that the first settlements in the Virgin Islands were by the Spanish, who mined copper at the copper mine on Virgin Gorda, but there is no archaeological evidence to support the existence of any settlement by the Spanish in the islands at any time, or any mining of copper on Virgin Gorda prior to the 19th century.

Tortola: By 1625, van Dyk was recognised by the Dutch West India Company as the private "Patron" of Tortola, and had moved his operations to Road Town. During the same year, van Dyk lent some limited (non-military) support to the Dutch Admiral Boudewijn Hendricksz, who sacked San Juan, Puerto Rico. In September 1625, in retaliation, the Spanish led a full assault on the island of Tortola, laying waste to its defences and destroying its embryonic settlements. Joost van Dyk himself escaped to the island that would later bear his name, and sheltered there from the Spanish. He later moved to the island of St. Thomas until the Spanish gave up and returned to Puerto Rico.

Notwithstanding the Spanish hostility, the Dutch West India Company still considered the Virgin Islands to have strategic value, as they were located approximately halfway between the Dutch colonies in South America (Suriname) and North America, (New Amsterdam, now New York City). Large stone warehouses were built at Freebottom, near Port Purcell (just east of Road Town), with the intention that these warehouses would facilitate exchanges of cargo between North and South America.

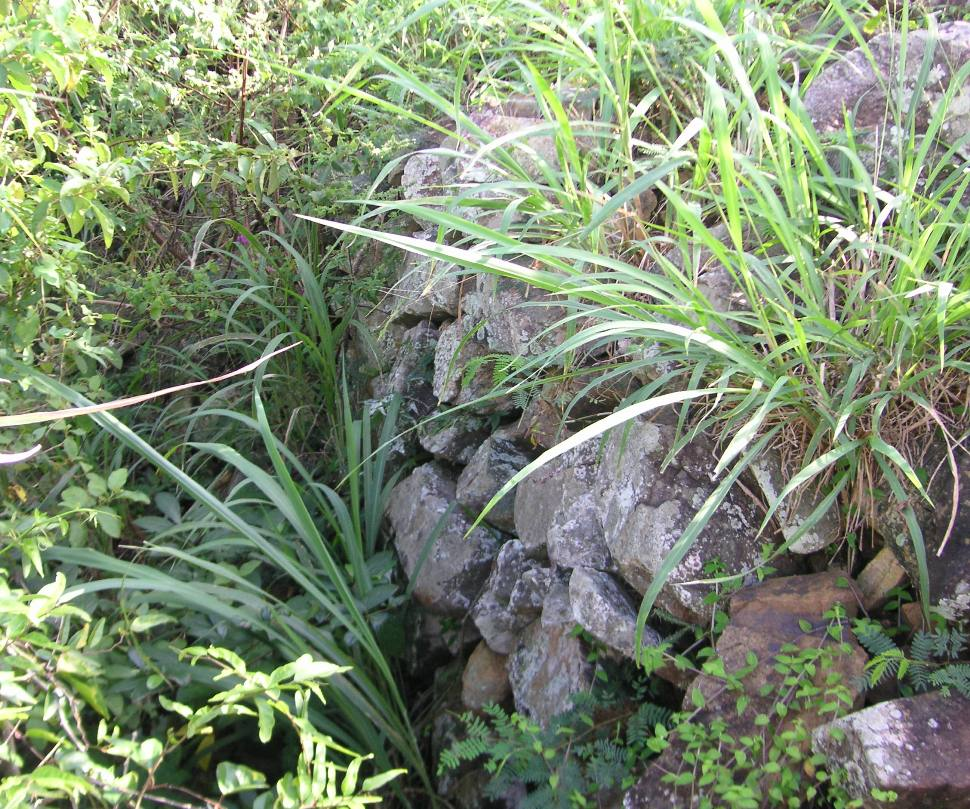
The remains of Fort Charlotte, built on an earlier lookout post erected by the Dutch

Tortola: At this time, the Dutch settlers erected some small earthworks and a three-cannon fort above the warehouse, on the hill where Fort George, Tortola would eventually be built by the English. He also constructed a wooden stockade to act as a lookout post above Road Town on the site that would eventually become Fort Charlotte, Tortola. They also stationed troops at the Spanish "dojon" near Pockwood Pond, later to be known as Fort Purcell, but now ordinarily referred to as "the Dungeon".

Virgin Gorda: In 1631, the Dutch West India Company expressed an interest in the copper which had been found at Copper Mine, Virgin Gorda, and a settlement was set up on that island, which came to be known as "Little Dyk's" (now known as Little Dix).

Tottola: In 1640, Spain attacked Tortola in an assault led by Captain Lopez. Two further attacks were made by the Spanish on Tortola in 1646 and 1647 led by Captain Francisco Vincente Duran. The Spanish anchored a warship in Soper's Hole at West End and landed men ashore. They then sent another warship to blockade Road Harbour. After a team of scouts returned a safe report, the Spanish landed more men and attacked Fort Purcell overland by foot. The Dutch were massacred, and the Spanish soldiers then moved marched to Road Town, where they killed everyone and destroyed the settlement. They did not, apparently, attack the smaller settlements further up the coast in Baugher's Bay, or on Virgin Gorda.

=== Decline of the Dutch West India Company ===
The settlements were not ultimately an economic success, and the evidence suggests that the Dutch spent most of their time more profitably engaged in privateering than trading. The lack of prosperity of the territory mirrored the lack of commercial success of the Dutch West India Company as a whole.

The company changed its policy, and it sought to cede islands such as Tortola and Virgin Gorda to private persons for settlement, and to establish slave pens. The island of Tortola was eventually sold to Willem Hunthum at some point in the 1650s, at which time the Dutch West India Company's interest in the territory effectively ended.

In 1665, the Dutch settlers on Tortola were attacked by a British privateer, John Wentworth, who is recorded as having captured 67 slaves which were removed to Bermuda. This is the first official record of slaves being held in the Territory.

Subsequently, in 1666, there were reports that a number of the Dutch settlers were driven out by an influx of British "brigands and pirates", although clearly a number of the Dutch remained. Britain took the islands from the Dutch as part of the Second Anglo-Dutch War.

== Islands ==
- Saint Croix (Dutch: Sint Kruis): First fortified by the WIC in 1625, which was the same year that Britain wanted to establish themselves there as well. French Protestants joined the Dutch. During this period, the Dutch occupied the east side of the island, and the British the west. In 1650, the fortress was abandoned after a conflict with the English. The Dutch colonists were settled at St. Eustatius. The British lost the island in that year to Spain.
- Saint Thomas: WIC established post in 1657. Danish West India Company assumed control in 1672, but Dutch presence persisted through Brandenburger Company lease from 1685 to 1754 when Danish repurchases Brandenburger lease.
- Tortola: In 1648, the WIC opened a successful post on the island. In 1665, a small group of Dutch settlers and African slaves were transported to the island to grow cane. England conquered the island in the year 1672.
- Anegada: Here was a post until 1680, more information is not known. After that, this island became an English possession.
- Virgin Gorda: A post was opened here in 1628. In 1680, it was acquired by the British.

== Remnants of Dutch occupation ==
Until the mid-20th century, there was a Dutch Creole language spoken on the islands—Negerhollands—especially by people whose ancestors were slaves, and those who had worked on Dutch plantations. There are still some ruins to see, and the island of Jost Van Dyke is named after the Dutch pirate.
