= JVD =

JVD may refer to:

- Jost Van Dyke, the smallest of the four main islands of the British Virgin Islands
- Joost van Dyk, a Dutch privateer
- Jugular venous distention, a component of the Beck's triad
- JVD (company), a French company that manufactures hygiene and hotel equipment
- jvd, the ISO 639-3 code for Javindo, a Dutch-based creole language
