= 1735 British Virgin Islands Assembly elections =

Assembly elections were held in the British Virgin Islands in 1735.

== Background ==
In early 1735 Governor William Matthew established a Council and Assembly for both Tortola and Virgin Gorda. Although the six-member Councils were appointed by the Governor, the nine-member Assemblies were elected.

== Electoral system ==
Tortola was divided into three three-member constituencies; Fat Hog Bay, Road and Saka Bay. Virgin Gorda had two constituencies, with Valley electing six members and North and South Sound electing three. Voters were generally the residents rather than the freeholders.

== Aftermath ==
Following the elections, it became apparent that Governor Matthew had misinterpreted his commission. As a result, the creation of the Assemblies was illegal. Matthew was reprimanded by the Lords of Trade and the Assemblies were subsequently disbanded, although the Councils continued to meet. Elections were not held again until 1773.
