= Oil Nut Bay =

Coral reef bay in the British Virgin Islands

Coordinates: 18.499971°N 64.330138°W

Location in the British Virgin Islands

Oil Nut Bay is a coral reef bay situated on the northeast coast of Virgin Gorda in the British Virgin Islands, about 1 kilometre (0.62 mi) west of Pajaros Point.

== Location ==
Oil Nut Bay is a coral reef bay, which is described as "headland attached linear reef". The beach at Oil Nut Bay stretches for about 0.5 miles (0.80 km). The coastline extends to Leverick Bay, along a stretch which is characterised by its mangroves. During an excursion in the 1970s, roughly 160 trees and large shrubs were identified in the area, including Eugenia sessiliflora.

== Commercial development ==
A resort community, intended for the wealthy with multi-million dollar villas, is developing at Oil Nut Bay, led by American developer David Johnson and his company, Victor International. The firm was given the planning permission to build 400 villas, but decided on building 88 of them, set in 300 acres. A May 2016 article by Caribbean Journal announced that the resort is still expanding, focusing on the development of four to six bedroom villas. The development is being built with underground utilities and is powered by solar energy. The resort has a double helipad and luxury tennis courts.

To the southwest of Oil Nut Bay is the Yacht Club Costa Smeralda (YCCS), which accommodates 38 slips for yachts up to 300 feet (91 m). The clubhouse was inaugurated in January 2012. The Oil Nut Bay and the YCCS development had together employed over 200 people.

== Threats ==
The major project at Oil Nut Bay is decreasing the amount of dry tropical forest and increasing traffic of people and materials within and between the islands and other locations, creating a threat to the local herpetofauna. Oil Nut Bay is particularly vulnerable to anchor damage due to its scenic appeal.

== Sources ==
- Aqua Expeditions: Great global hot spots for scuba diving and snorkeling, W.C. Church, 1 January 1999, p. 51, ISBN 978-0-9643711-1-8
- Hailey, Adrian; Wilson, Byron; Horrocks, Julia (2011-04-07), Conservation of Caribbean Island Herpetofaunas Volume 2: Regional Accounts of the West Indies, BRILL, ISBN 978-90-04-19408-3
- Little, Elbert Luther; Woodbury, Roy O.; Wadsworth, Frank Howard (1976), Flora of Virgin Gorda (British Virgin Islands), United States. Forest Service, Institute of Tropical Forestry
- IBP Inc. (2007-02-07), Virgin Islands Economic and Development Strategy Handbook Volume 1 Strategic Information and Developments, Lulu.com, ISBN 978-1-4330-5890-5
- Sheppard, Charles (14 March 2013), Coral Reefs of the United Kingdom Overseas Territories, Springer Science & Business Media, ISBN 978-94-007-5965-7
- Wells, Sue (1988), Coral Reefs of the World: Atlantic and eastern Pacific, UNEP, ISBN 978-2-88032-943-3
