= Cooten Bay ruin =

Ruin in the British Virgin Islands

Coordinates: 18.446791°N 64.597976°W

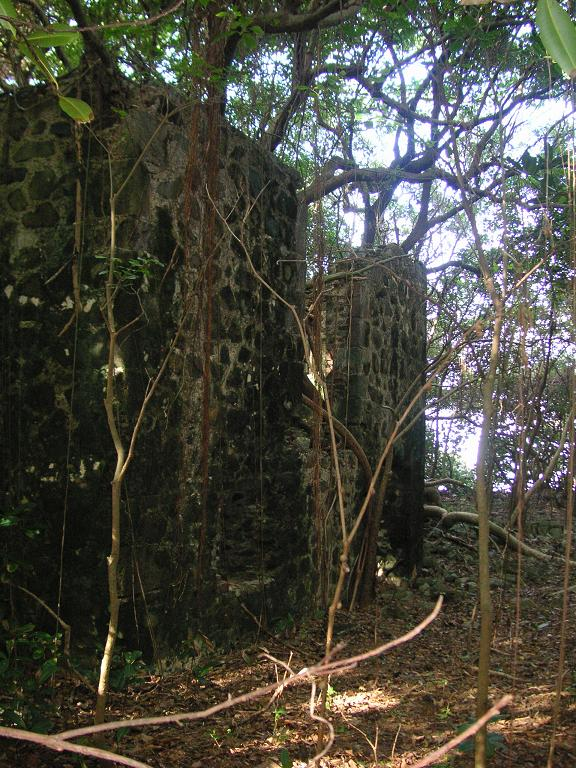
The ruins at Cooten Bay.

The Cooten Bay ruin is a ruin in Cooten Bay, on the north side of Tortola in the British Virgin Islands. The ruin probably dates from the sugar plantation era, although the fortification of the property with cannon may suggest an earlier date. It is presumed that it was abandoned during the economic collapse of the British Virgin Islands during the mid-19th century, when many plantations were abandoned.

Until relatively recently, the ruin was extremely difficult to get to as no roads led to the bay, and the ghauts leading down the mountain side were relatively steep. The bay is not accessible by sea due to the coral reefs lying close to the shore and the strong north side swells. However, in 2006, a road was cut down to within few hundred feet above the bay as part of a housing development. Visitors can now get to the ruins by climbing down a steep stream bed just a few hundred feet long.

There is almost no historical record of the ruin, and it may be one of the many relatively impoverished sugar plantations that fell into financial distress after the United Kingdom passed the Sugar Duties Act 1846 and was most likely abandoned after the insurrection of 1853. Some locals refer to it as the "Indigo factory" although there is no contemporary evidence that the structure was used in manufacture of Indigo cotton.

Two cannons remain on site at the ruin, which was clearly fortified (one cannon was thought to have been stolen but it is actually partially buried). However, it is not clear that the ruin was a full fort, and it was certainly not a publicly maintained fort. It is a slightly curious area to fortify as the coral reefs would make any landing from the sea very difficult. No armed conflicts are known to have occurred in the area of Cooten Bay in the history of the British Virgin Islands.

== Images ==
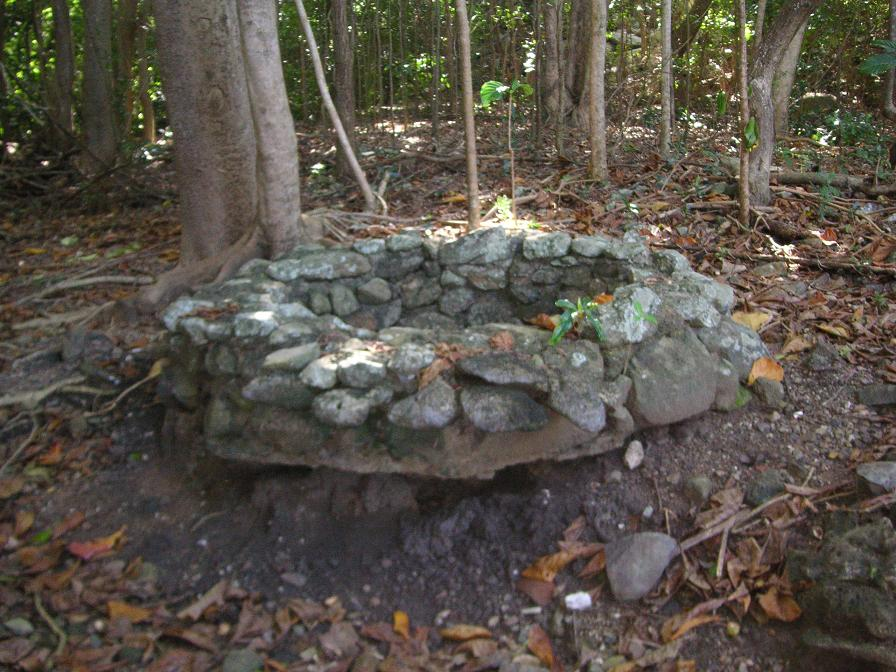
The well for the house

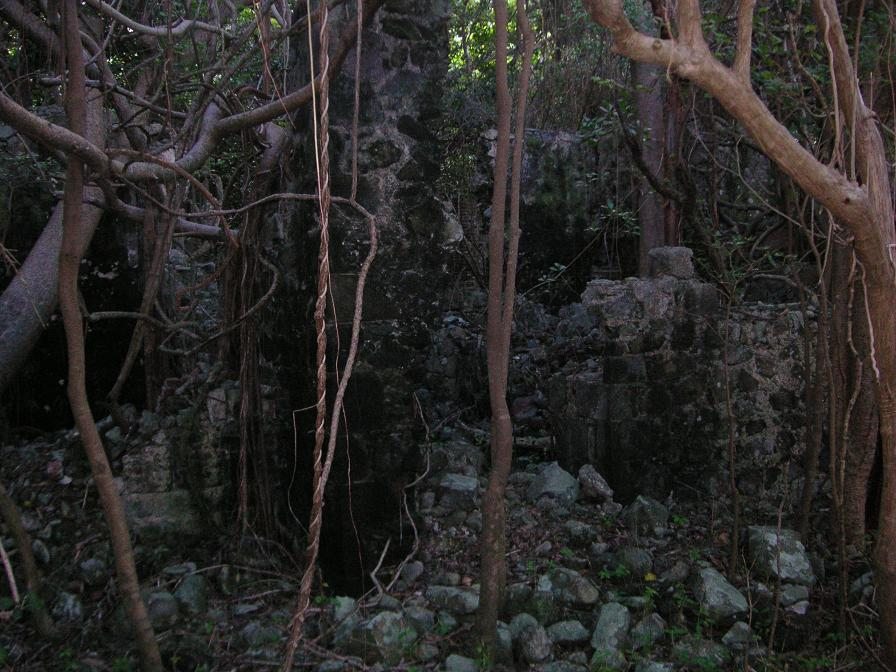
Part of the ruin

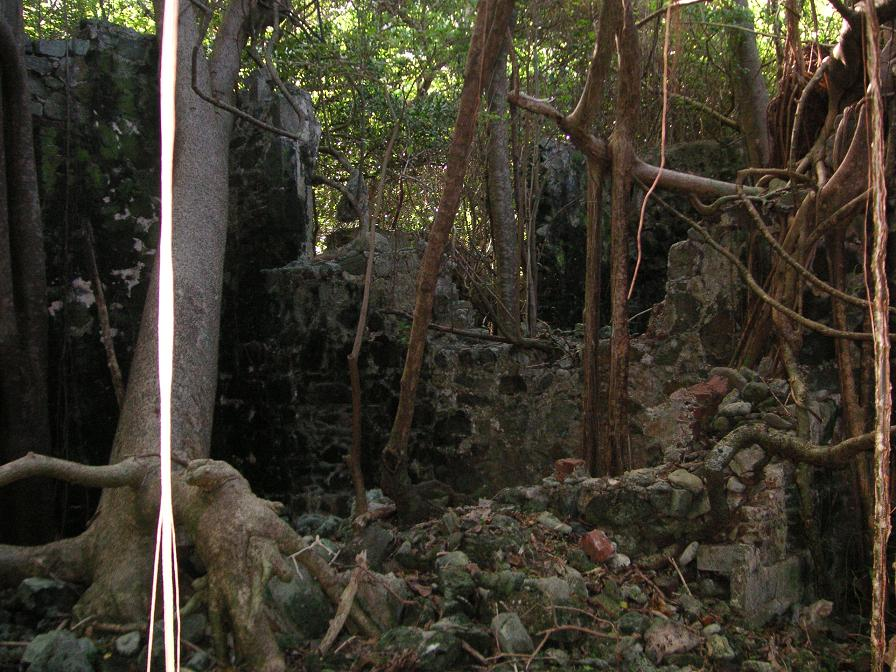
Part of the ruin

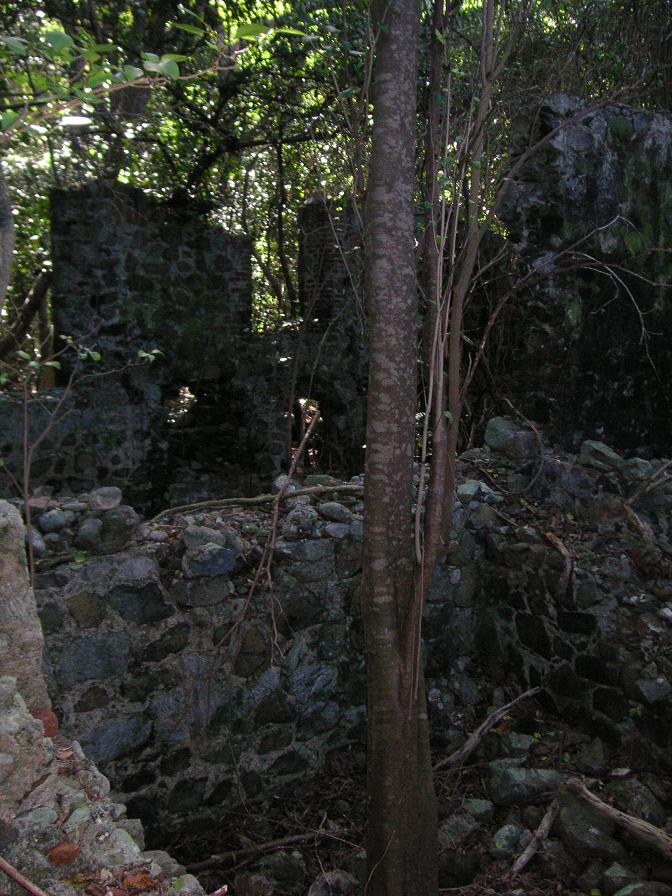
A tree now grows inside the main house

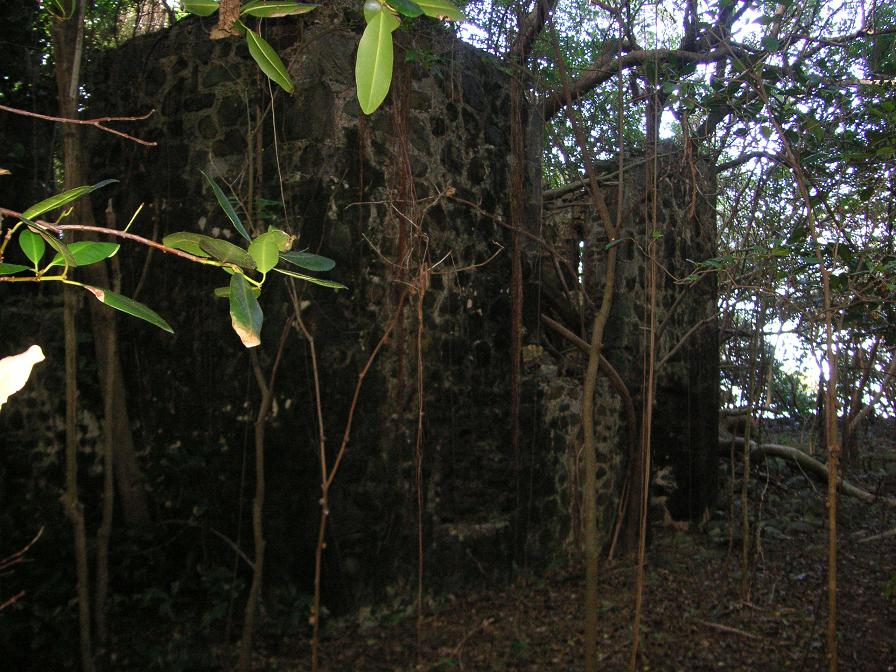
The view as you approach from the path

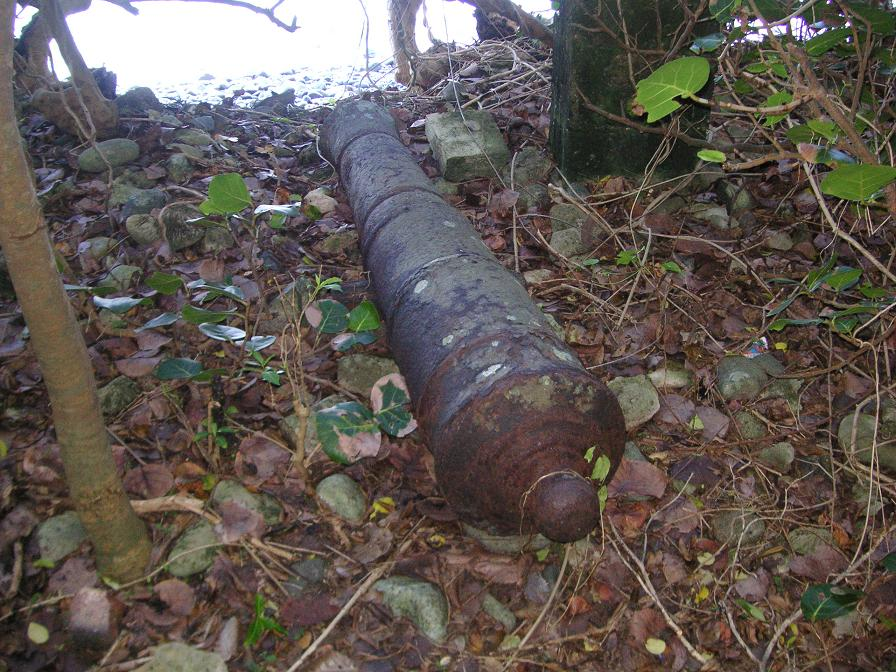
One of the two cannons still on site

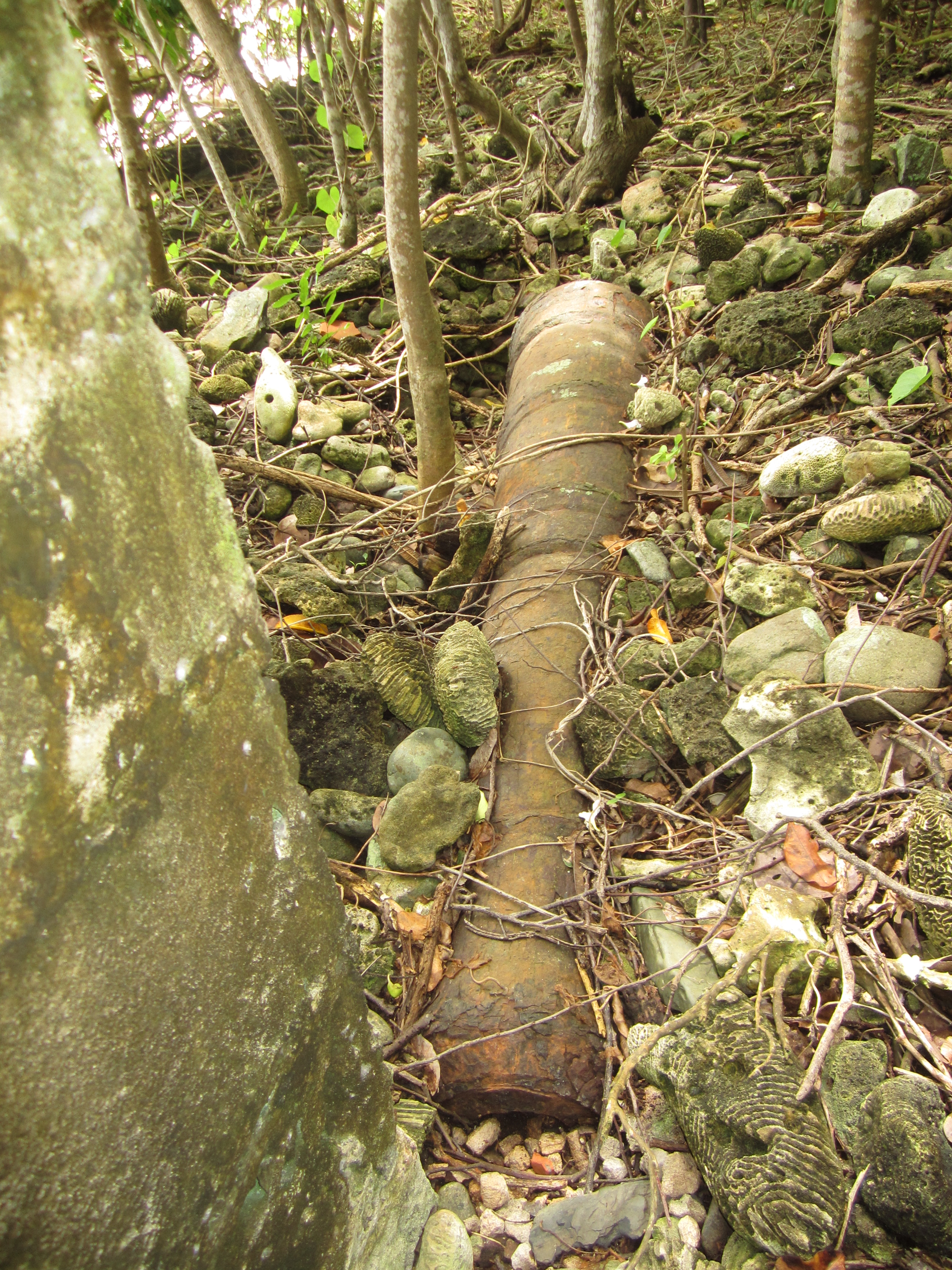
The second of two cannons at the site
