= Benjamin Byas =

American politician

Benjamin Byas (1842 – ) was an African-American lawyer and politician during the Reconstruction era. He was a member of the South Carolina House of Representatives representing Orangeburg County from 1870 to 1872, best remembered for being shot by a journalist he was assaulting at the South Carolina State House.

Byas was born in Saint Thomas, Dutch Virgin Islands, to George Byas of Maryland and Dode, born in Haiti. He attended Howard University in 1870.

== Career ==
Byas represented Berkeley County at the 1868 South Carolina Constitutional Convention. He was one of four "colored" delegates from the county.

In the South Carolina House of Representatives, he advocated strongly that educational institutions receiving public funds should open to all "regardless of race or color". He opposed compulsory education.

Byas was an instigator of a notoriously inept and corrupt South Carolina Congress. Byas frequently stalled House business by various methods, including taking roll call repeatedly for hours, and giving lengthy and unnecessary speeches.

John Schreiner Reynolds, librarian of the Supreme Court of South Carolina, in 1905 described Byas as "a burly fellow with a hard face, ignorant, insolent, vindictive and corrupt—whose presence in the Legislature was a continuing outrage upon the white race in South Carolina and equally a disgrace to the Republican party everywhere."

== 1872 shooting ==
In February 1872, Byas suffered a minor wound when he was shot by journalist B. W. Tomlinson of The Charleston News. The day prior to the shooting, Byas had been accused by Thomas Williams, an African-American barber from Charleston, of being "on too intimate terms" with Williams' wife. Williams arrived at the state house and confronted Byas with a cowhide whip and a revolver to demand satisfaction, at which point Byas pulled out his own revolver. Congressman Robert B. Elliott intervened and prevented violence.

However, the following day, Tomlinson openly mocked Byas in his account of the altercation in The Charleston News, accusing Byas of being cowardly by not agreeing to the duel that was "usual among Southern gentlemen." Byas, clutching a green rawhide, confronted Tomlinson at the statehouse and informed him "I am going to thrash you, sir, within an inch of your life!" and struck him with the whip. In response, Tomlinson pulled out his revolver and shot Byas in the shoulder. Tomlinson was arrested but was released on bail when it was learned Byas was not seriously injured. He returned to work 10 days later.

The New York Sun commented:

"Byas is one of the most extraordinary negroes in the South Carolina legislature. He is a natural orator, and, with education and becoming modesty, would have made his mark almost anywhere. But his ignorance, inordinate conceit, and utter lack of moral principle, have disgusted everybody with him, and he has hardly a friend in the legislature. Byas always makes it a point to get on the negative side of a question, and he will harangue the house for hours in his peculiar way on a matter of no importance at all, or, if of importance, on the side that admits of no argument in his favor. Byas is so unpopular with the colored people here, that, with few exceptions, they justify the course taken by Mr. Tomlinson in defending himself."

— The New York Sun, February 22, 1872
