= Cooper Bay ruin =

Ruin in the British Virgin Islands

Coordinates: 18°26′55″N 64°37′02″W

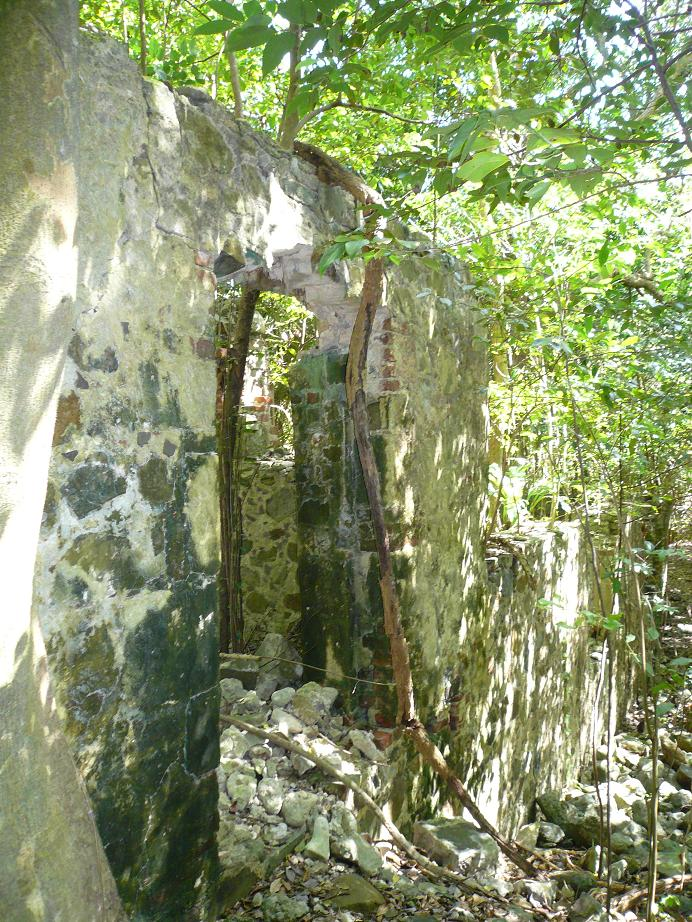
The ruins at Cooper Bay.

Cooper Bay ruin is a ruin in Cooper Bay, on the north side of Tortola in the British Virgin Islands. The ruin dates from the sugar plantation era, and was presumed abandoned during the economic collapse of the British Virgin Islands during the mid-19th century.

Until relatively recently, the ruins were extremely difficult to get to, as no roads led to the bay, and the ghauts leading down the mountain side were relatively steep. The bay is not accessible by sea due to the coral reefs lying close to the shore, and the strong north side swells. However, in 2007 a long road was cut down to the bay as part of a housing development making it relatively simple for visitors to see the ruins.

There is almost no historical record of the ruin, and it is presumed to one of the many relatively impoverished sugar plantations that fell into financial distress after the United Kingdom passed the Sugar Duties Act 1846, and was most likely abandoned after the insurrection of 1853.

Although the ruins were clearly fortified (four musket firing bays are clearly visible on the seaward side of the ground floor on the main house), the house was not a public maintained fort, and was not known to have engaged in any armed conflicts. It is possible that the ruin was only fortified subsequently as a potential defence and slave insurrections prior to the abolition of slavery.

As of October 2024, the plot of land containing the ruin was up for sale by Sotheby's.

== Images ==
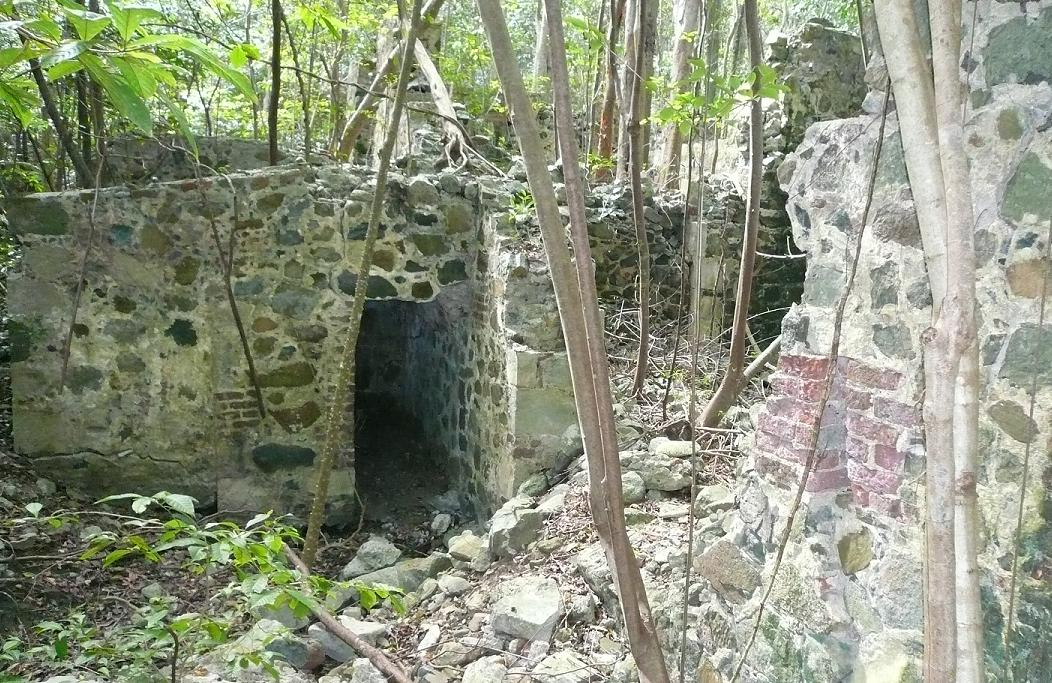

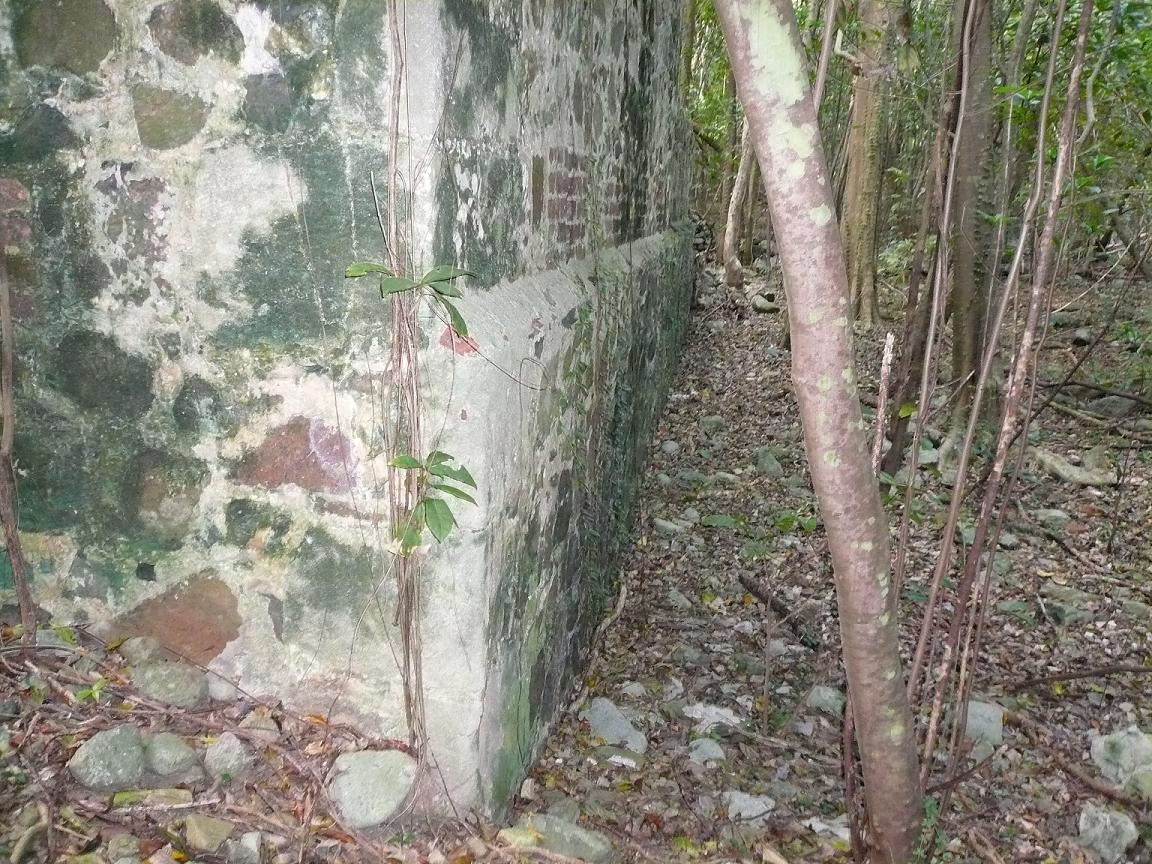

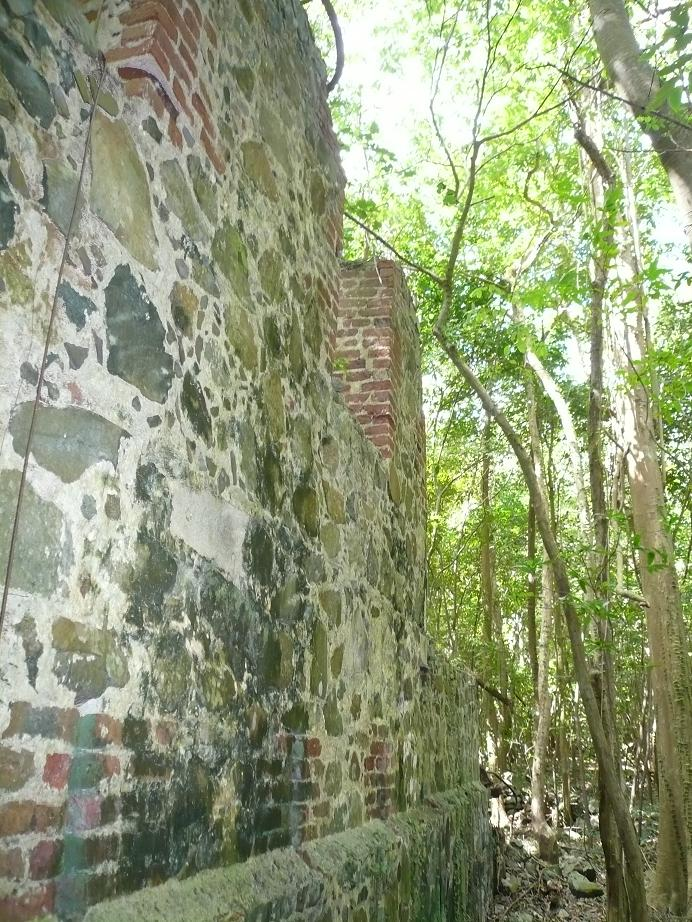

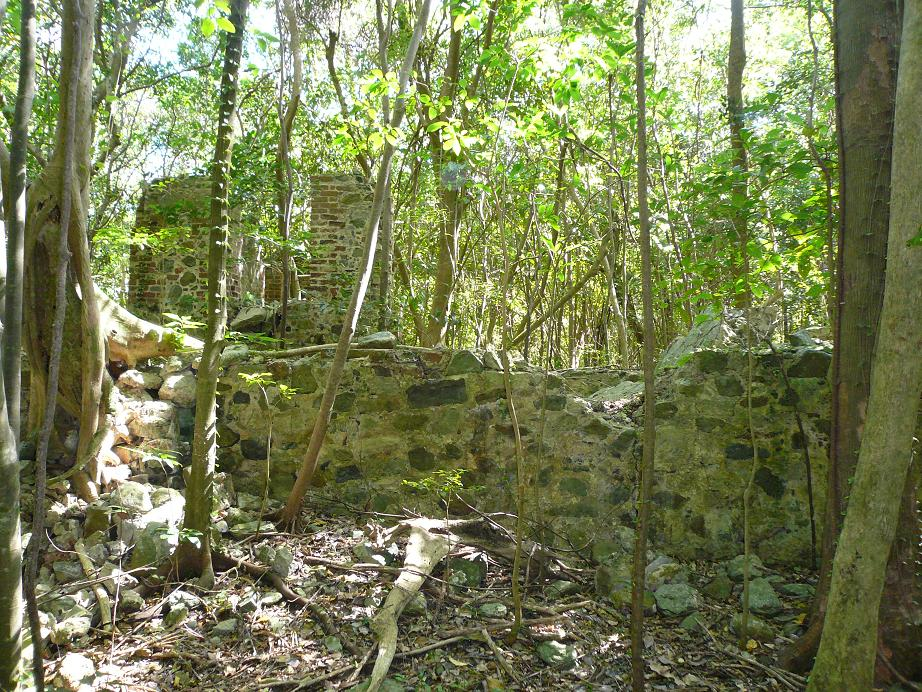

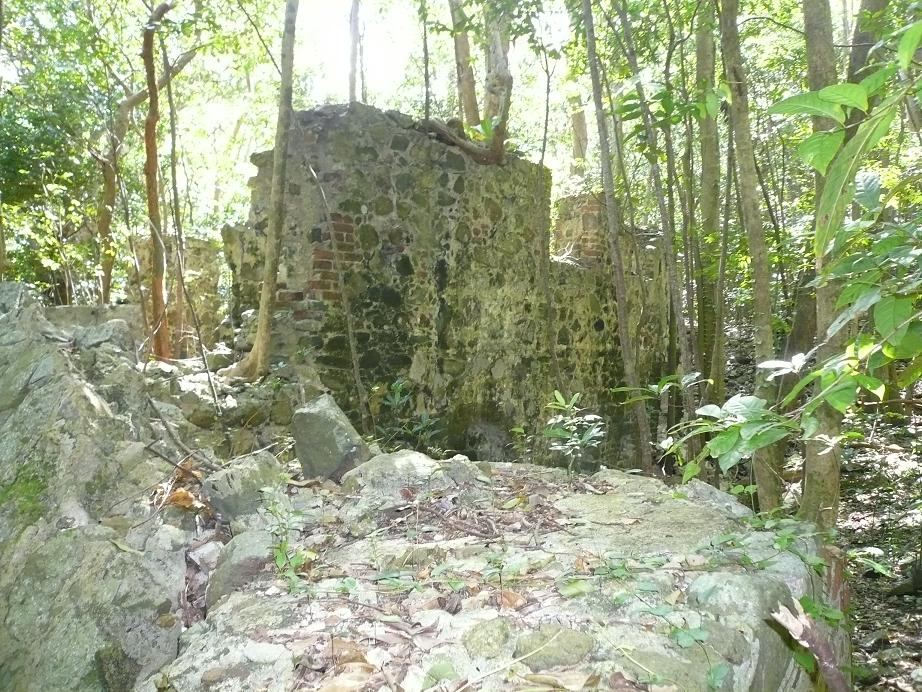

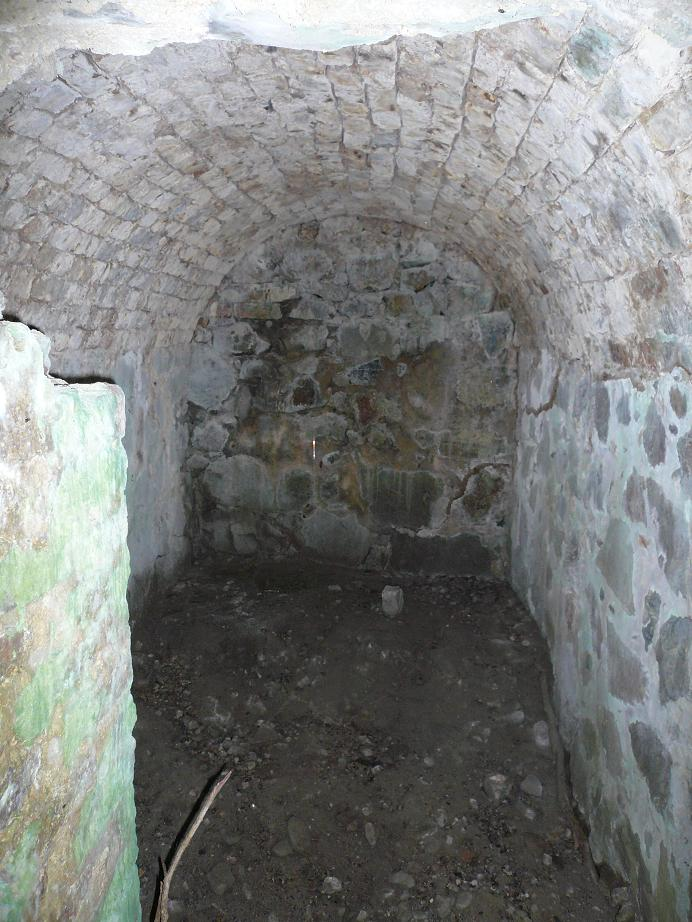

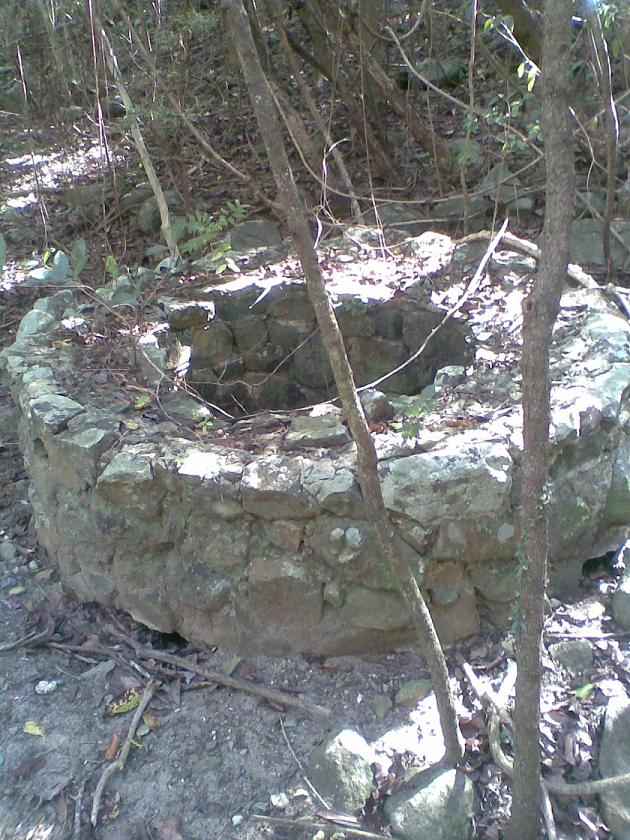

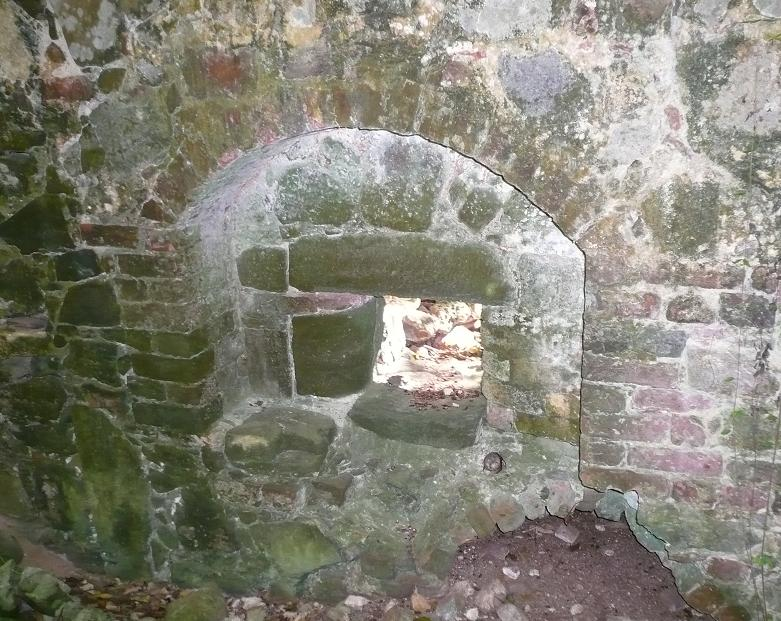
