= Joost van Dyk =

Dutch privateer and early European settler in the British Virgin Islands

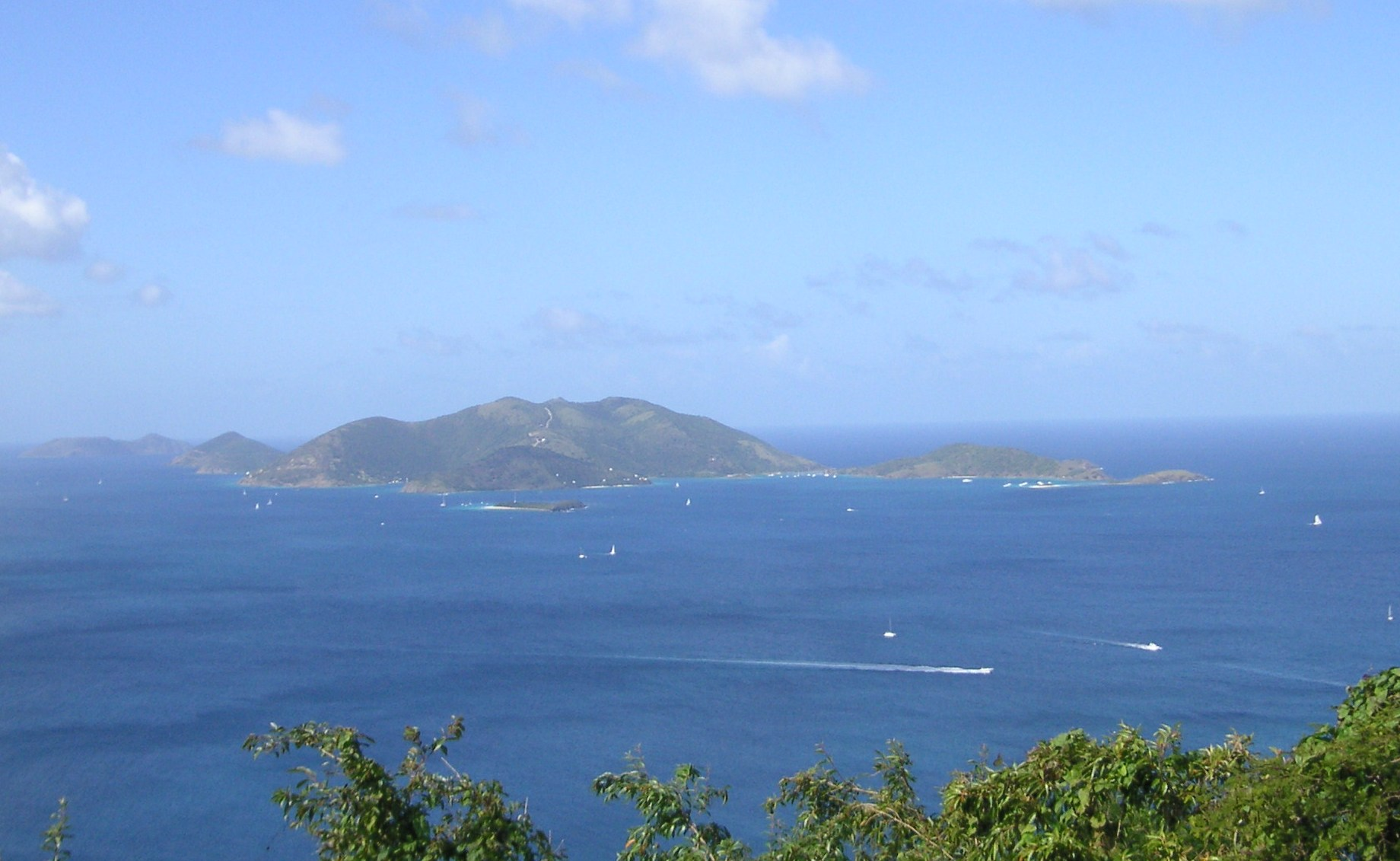
Jost Van Dyke, the island named after the privateer

Joost van Dyk (sometimes spelled Joost van Dyke) was a Dutch privateer (and, reportedly, sometime pirate) who was one of the earliest European settlers in the British Virgin Islands in the seventeenth century, and established the first permanent settlements within the Territory. The islands of Jost Van Dyke and its smaller neighbor Little Jost Van Dyke ("Little Jost"), as well as Little Dix Bay on Virgin Gorda island, are named after him.

== Soper's Hole settlement ==
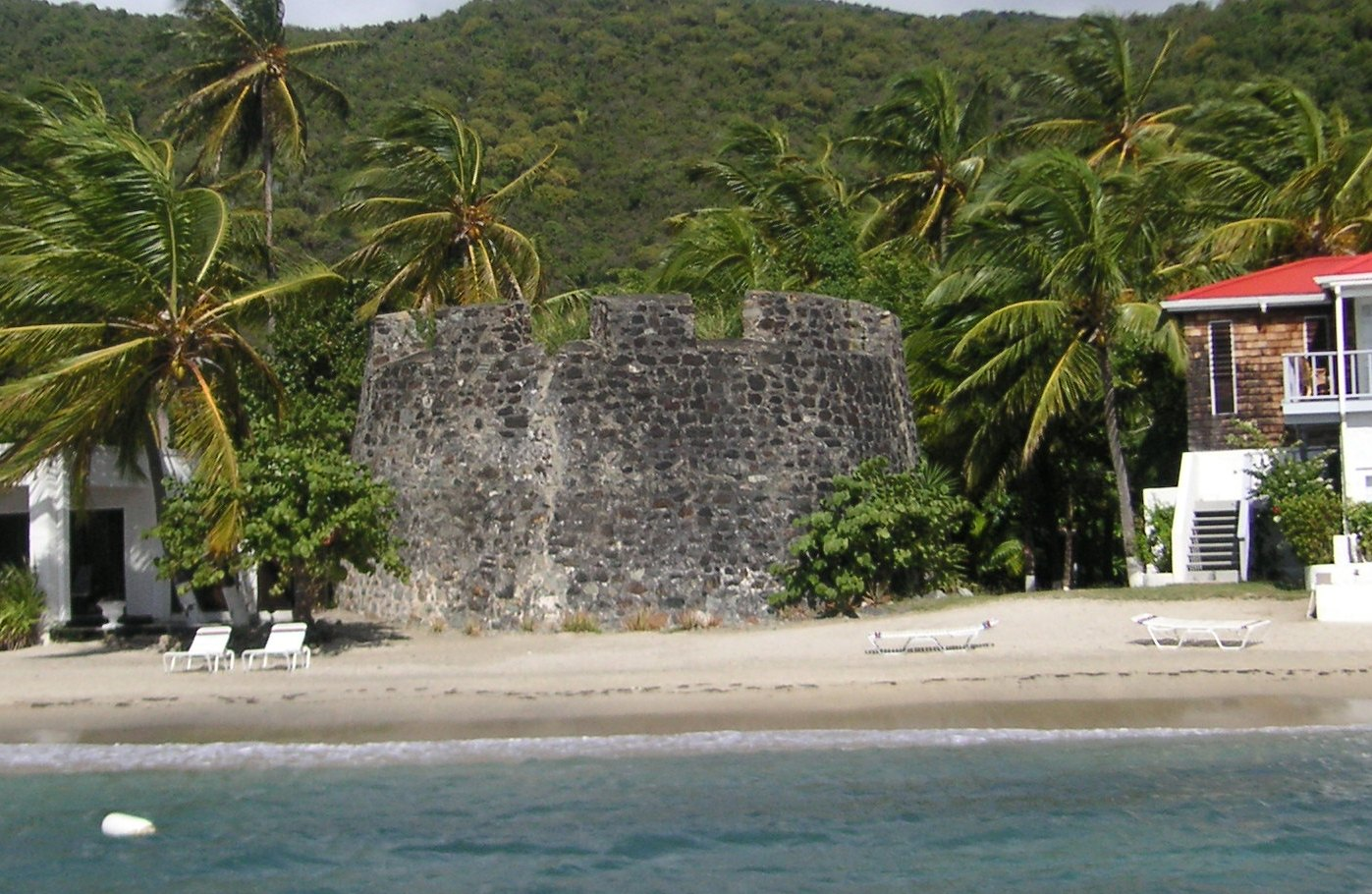
Fort Recovery

The early colonial history of the British Virgin Islands is not especially well documented. However, it is known that during the early years of the seventeenth century, Van Dyk had created a small settlement at Soper's Hole on Tortola's West End, leading a largely unremarkable career as a privateer or pirate, and that he was trading with the Spanish settlers in Puerto Rico in breach of a Papal concession to the Spaniards. Between raids, Van Dyk and his crew farmed cotton and tobacco. By 1615 Van Dyk's settlement was recorded in Spanish contemporary records as having expanded, and consisting of Dutch, French and English pirates, who had constructed some small defences. At this time the Spanish Governor in Puerto Rico began to regard Van Dyk less as an irritation and more as a potential threat to Spanish trading interests in the region. However, at the time the Dutch Republic and Spain were subject to a binding truce. When the truce came to an end in 1620 Van Dyk perceived his potential vulnerability, and built a more substantial earthen fort at what would later be named Fort Recovery.

== Road Town settlement ==
By 1625 Van Dyk was recognised by the Dutch West India Company as the private "Patron" of Tortola, and had moved his operations to Road Town (at that time, simply known as "The Road"). During the same year Van Dyk lent some limited (non-military) support to the Dutch Admiral Boudewijn Hendricksz, who sacked San Juan, Puerto Rico (although he was unable to take Fort San Felipe del Morro). In 1628 Dutch Admiral Piet Heyn plundered the Spanish treasure fleet, and these two attacks stung the Spanish to retaliation.

In September 1625 the Spanish led a full assault on the island of Tortola, laying waste to its defences and destroying its nascent settlements. Joost van Dyk himself escaped to the island that would later bear his name, and sheltered there from the Spanish. He later moved to the island of Saint Thomas until the Spanish gave up their attacks and returned to Puerto Rico.

== Baugher's Bay settlement ==
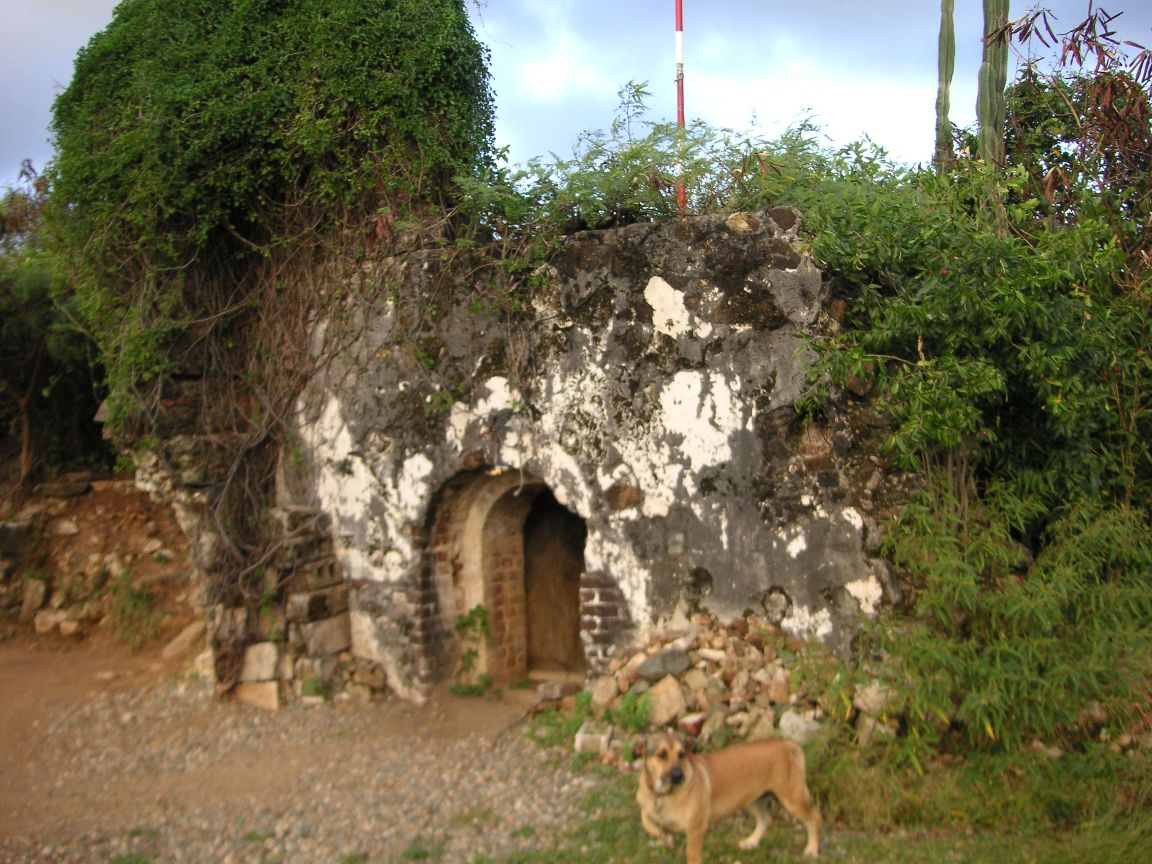
Remains of Fort George

Despite their limited economic importance, the Dutch West India Company still considered the Virgin Islands to have an important strategic value, as they were located approximately halfway between the Dutch West India Company's colonies in Brazil and New Amsterdam (now New York City). Under the orders of Peter Stuyvesant, the director of the Dutch West India Company, Van Dyk built large stone warehouses at Freebottom, near Port Purcell (just east of Road Town), with the intention that these warehouses would facilitate exchanges of cargo between North and South America.

Fearing a repetition of the recent attack, Van Dyk erected some small earthworks and a three-cannon fort above the warehouse, on the hill where Fort George would eventually be built by the English. He also constructed a wooden stockade to act as a lookout post above Road Town on the site that would eventually become Fort Charlotte.

He also stationed troops at the Spanish "dojon" near Pockwood Pond, later to be known at Fort Purcell, but now ordinarily referred as "the Dungeon".

== Virgin Gorda settlement ==
In 1631 the Dutch West India Company expressed an interest in the copper which had been discovered on Virgin Gorda. Joost van Dyk set up another settlement on that island, which came to be known as "Little Dyk's" (now known as Little Dix).

== Decline of the Dutch West India Company ==
Notwithstanding the strategic location of the settlements, or the discovery of copper, the settlements were not an economic success, and the evidence suggests that Van Dyk spent most of his time more profitably engaged in privateering (or piracy, depending upon one's perspective). The lack of prosperity of the territory mirrored the lack of commercial success of the Dutch West India Company as a whole.

The company changed its policy, and it sought to cede islands such as Tortola and Virgin Gorda to private persons for settlement, and to establish slave pens. The island of Tortola was eventually sold to Willem Hunthum at some point in the 1650s, at which time the Dutch West India Company's interest in the Territory effectively ended.

== Death ==
In September 1625, Joost van Dyk's recorded involvement with the British Virgin Islands came to an end. He is believed to have died in or after 1631.

== Sources ==
- Vernon Pickering, Early history of the British Virgin Islands: From Columbus to emancipation, ISBN 88-85047-12-2
- Isaac Dookhan, A History of the British Virgin Islands 1672 to 1970, ISBN 0-85935-026-6
