= 1773 British Virgin Islands general election =

General elections were held in the British Virgin Islands in 1773.

== Background ==
A petition by residents of the Virgin Islands for the creation of a constitution or a judicial system was made to the British government in 1756, but was rejected. A second attempt was made in 1773, and granted by royal prerogative. In June 1773 Governor Ralph Payne was ordered to issue the writs for an election. He subsequently proclaimed the establishment of a legislature on 30 November.

== Electoral system ==
A new House of Assembly was created, with 11 elected members. Eight were elected in Tortola, two in Virgin Gorda and one in Jost Van Dyke. The right to vote was restricted to white men owning at least 10 acres of land or property worth at least £10. Candidacy was restricted to white men over the age of 21 who owned at least 40 acres of land or property worth £40, or to sons of men owning 80 acres of land or a property worth at least £80. Candidates had to be residents of the constituency that they ran for election in.

In addition to the House of Assembly, a 12-member Legislative Council, also known as the Board, was created, which was appointed by the Governor.

== Aftermath ==
The newly elected House of Assembly met for the first time on 1 February 1774.
