= Fort Purcell =

Coordinates: 18.3934°N 64.6511°W

Fort Purcell (more often known by the moniker The Dungeon) is a ruined fort near Pockwood Pond on the island of Tortola in the British Virgin Islands.

== History ==
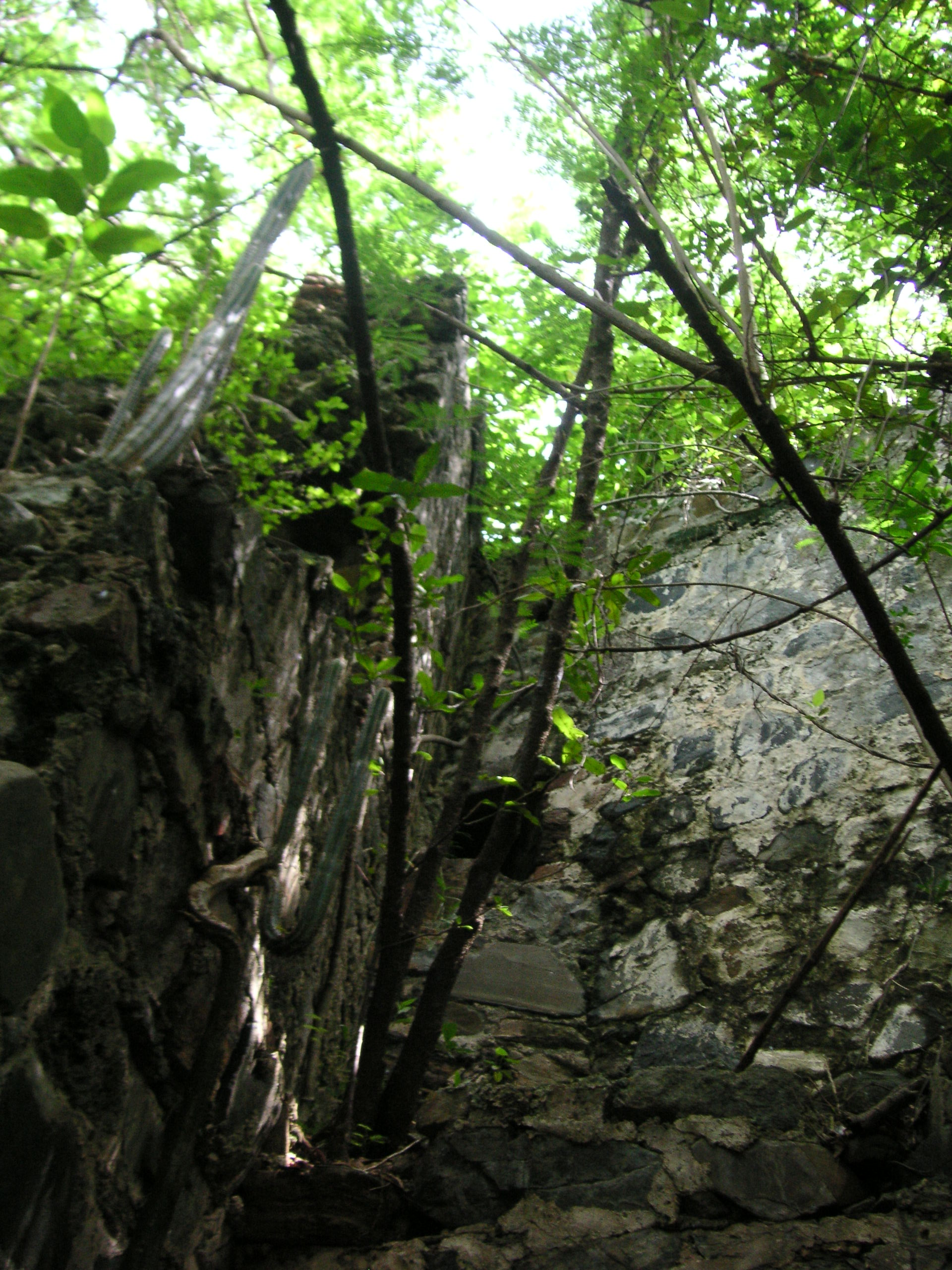
Inside of Fort Purcell, better known as "The Dungeons"

The Fort was built by the Dutch at an unascertained date in either the late 16th or very early 17th century, and was known by the Spanish authorities in Puerto Rico as the "donjon" (from which the English name, "the Dungeon" comes – the fort has never actually been used as a dungeon). The fort was originally only earthen, and was occupied intermittently, but it was restored by the Dutch privateer Joost van Dyk in 1625 or 1626.

Documents from archives in Seville, Spain, report about two attacks that the Spanish made on Tortola in 1646 and 1647. The reports indicate that the Spanish anchored a warship in Soper's Hole at West End and landed men ashore. They then sent another warship to blockade Road Harbour. After a team of scouts returned a safe report, the Spanish landed more men and attacked Fort Purcell by foot from the land. The Dutch were massacred and the Spanish soldiers then moved overland to Road Town.

The Fort fell into disrepair, but was restored in the early 1650s during the First Anglo–Dutch War. Reports of the next vary according to historical sources. Dutch historians aver that at the outbreak of the Third Anglo-Dutch War, the then (Dutch) owner of Tortola, Willem Hunthum, put Tortola under the protection of Sir William Stapleton, the English Governor-General of the Leeward Islands. Colonel William Burt was dispatched to Tortola to oversee the annexation on the understanding that the island would be returned to the Dutch when peace was declared. However, the English decided that Tortola had strategic importance and reneged upon the bargain, retaining control of the island. But before leaving the island, Colonel Burt destroyed the Dutch forts and removed all their cannon to avoid any inclination of the Dutch settlers to rebel. The English version suggests that Colonel Burt was sent to attack Tortola with a meagre force of 100 men, but that the Dutch immediately surrendered. Recognising that he could not hold the island, Burt dismantled the forts and removed the weaponry before returning to Saint Kitts. After the end of the war, the Dutch asked for return of the island, but the English declined. Fort Purcell was not rebuilt.

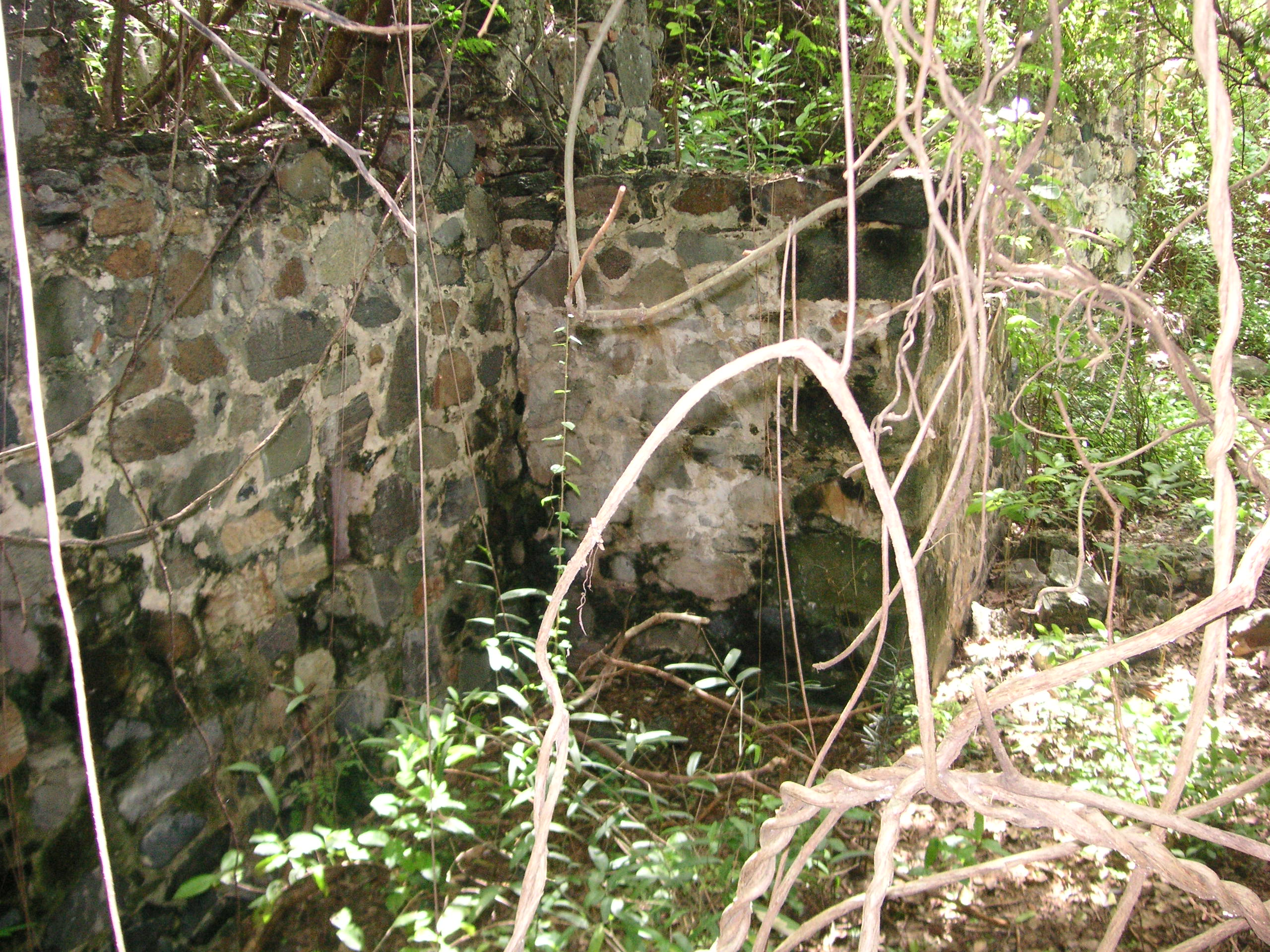
Part of Fort Purcell, better known as "The Dungeons"

Accordingly, in 1686, when pirates attacked a new English settlement, there was no fort and the island was taken easily. By 1715, the fort had still not been rebuilt when Captain Chandler, on HMS Winchelsey, made a report on the islands.

The population and economic activity on Tortola expanded, and the question of fortification of the island became more pressing. In the early 1750s, Governor Purcell wrote to the Lords of Trade and Plantations that he had rebuilt a fort with four bastions on the site of the original Dutch fort which had been laid to ruin by the English in 1672 (it is presumably at this point Fort Purcell was named or renamed after the Purcell brothers, James Purcell (1750–1751) and John Purcell (1751–1775) who served as Presidents of the British Virgin Islands Council consecutively from; their plantations were in this area and the fort was rebuilt privately to protect their interests; planters would also have had to erect batteries and forts at their own expense at the time, to protect the individual plantations in secluded bays not covered by the Government forts).

With the subsequent severe economic decline of the islands which accompanied the abolition of slavery, the Purcell plantation was abandoned, and the fort fell into ruin.

== Structure ==
The use of different stone types in various parts of the building shows the evolution of the building's construction.

Inside one of the rooms are a series of graffiti drawings carved into the wall by a bored member of the garrison. One drawing shows a dancing girl and another, an officer or gentleman in a three quarter length coat. By dating the clothing worn by the people in the drawings we able to see that the fort would have been garrisoned during the Seven Years' War which took place between 1756 and 1763.

A red brick staircase leads to the gun battery which would have mounted six guns allowing the fort to completely cover the surrounding area of the Sir Francis Drake Channel. There is also a water cistern and a number of masonry platforms that would once have had wooden buildings on them for the officers and garrison accommodation.

== Today ==
Not unusually for historical buildings in the British Virgin Islands, Fort Purcell is on private land (the land was owned by the late Cyril Romney, a former chief minister of the Territory). However, it is freely accessible and often visited by tourists. Periodically suggestion is made that the government should acquire the site and clean it up, but this has not happened.

The island does not treat the ruins especially well today. They are not protected or preserved by law, and the area surrounding the Fort is often used as a dumping ground for waste (ironically enough, the incinerator for destroying rubbish, for which there is no charge in the Territory, lies less than half a mile away in Pockwood Pond). The ruins become heavily overgrown during the rainy season. There are also periodic reports of amateur archaeologists using metal detectors and removing historical artifacts from the unexcavated areas around the site.

== Sources ==
- Vernon Pickering, Early history of the British Virgin Islands: From Columbus to emancipation, ISBN 88-85047-12-2
- Isaac Dookhan, A History of the British Virgin Islands 1672 to 1970, ISBN 0-85935-026-6
