= St. Ursula's Church, The Valley =

Coordinates: 18°26′47″N 64°26′11″W

St. Ursula's Church
- St. Ursula's Church
- Location: The Valley; Virgin Gorda
- Country: British Virgin Islands
- Denomination: Roman Catholic Church

St. Ursula's Church is a Catholic church in The Valley on the island of Virgin Gorda in the British Virgin Islands.

The Church is dedicated to St. Ursula. It follows the Roman or Latin rite and is within diocese of Saint John's-Basseterre. It stands out as having a prime location because it is built on a hill on the road to the tourist attraction of The Baths near the marina.

The congregation completed construction of the church in 1989. The parish supports various local activities such as religious education, youth ministry, music ministry and Catholic Community Center.

== See also ==
- Roman Catholic Diocese of Saint John's – Basseterre
- Holy Family Cathedral (St. John's)
