= Eugenia sessiliflora =

Conservation status
- Near Threatened (IUCN 3.1)

Scientific classification
- Kingdom: Plantae
- Clade: Tracheophytes
- Clade: Angiosperms
- Clade: Eudicots
- Clade: Rosids
- Order: Myrtales
- Family: Myrtaceae
- Genus: Eugenia
- Species: E. sessiliflora

Binomial name
- Eugenia sessiliflora Vahl

Species of flowering plant

Eugenia sessiliflora, the sessileleaf stopper, is a species of flowering plant native to Puerto Rico and the Virgin Islands.
