= JVD (company) =

French company

- Type: Joint-stock company
- Industry: Hygiene, hotel Equipment
- Founded: 1984 in Nantes, France
- Founder: Jacques de Vasselot
- Headquarters: Rezé, France
- Key people: Thierry Launois (CEO)
- Products: Hand dryers, soap dispensers, air purifiers, hotel accessories
- Revenue: €35 million (2023)
- Number of employees: 130
- Subsidiaries: JVD Singapore, JVD Mexico, JVD Spain
- Website: www.jvd.fr

JVD is a French company that manufactures hygiene and hotel equipment. It was established in 1984 by Jacques de Vasselot and is based in Rezé, near Nantes, France. The company produces a variety of products, including hand dryers, soap and towel dispensers, and air purifiers, primarily for the hygiene sector. Additionally, JVD offers a range of equipment for the hotel industry, such as hair dryers, kettles, courtesy trays, mirrors, and minibars.

== History ==
The company was established in 1984 by Jacques de Vasselot in Nantes. JVD first product, a hand dryer, debuted in 1988, marking the beginning of its product diversification which later included hair dryers in 1991.

JVD expanded internationally with the creation of JVD Asia in 1999, followed by JVD Spain in 2007, and JVD Americas in 2015. In October 2016, Thierry Launois was appointed as the CEO. In 2023, JVD achieved a turnover of 35 million euros.

== Products and innovations ==
In early 2020, JVD launched HygiaConnect, a connected equipment range designed to alert cleaning staff about malfunctions or consumable replacements. In April 2020, the company equipped Nantes tramways with connected hydro-alcoholic gel dispensers and sold one million such dispensers during the COVID-19 pandemic.

In March 2021, JVD introduced the Shield air purifier, which utilizes smart mineralization technology, covered by two patents. This system employs HEPA filtration, molecular neutralization, and mineralization to address pollutants. A compact version of the Shield air purifier, known as the Shield Compact, was released in 2022.

In mid-2022, JVD launched Sup’air Fresh, a new hand dryer that treats and eliminates bad odors in busy washrooms. In July 2022, JVD inaugurated Imagin’air, a new multifunction site in Rezé.

== Partnerships and acquisitions ==
JVD has engaged in several strategic partnerships, including with INHNI in June 2020 to develop training modules, and with MoveWORK in January 2021 to create solutions for cleaning managers. In January 2024, JVD acquired Novven, a company specializing in drying, disinfection, and decontamination cabinets, and subsequently launched the Novven By JVD brand.

In February 2024, JVD launched Reborn by JVD, a brand of reconditioned hand dryers.

In March 2024, 52% of JVD's capital was taken over by Thierry Launois and seven other company executives.

== Social responsibility ==
In partnership with Eau et Vie, JVD distributed 5,000 hygiene kits among the poorest populations in the Philippines in early 2023.

== Awards and recognition ==
JVD has received several awards, including the IoT Challenge Expert Prize in 2020 by Objenious (Bouygues Telecom), and the Prize for the best innovation of the year 2020 for HygiaConnect, awarded by the ESSI Propreté Group, and the Janus of the industry in 2021.
