= Copper Mine, Virgin Gorda =

National park in the British Virgin Islands

Coordinates: 18.434°N 64.427°W

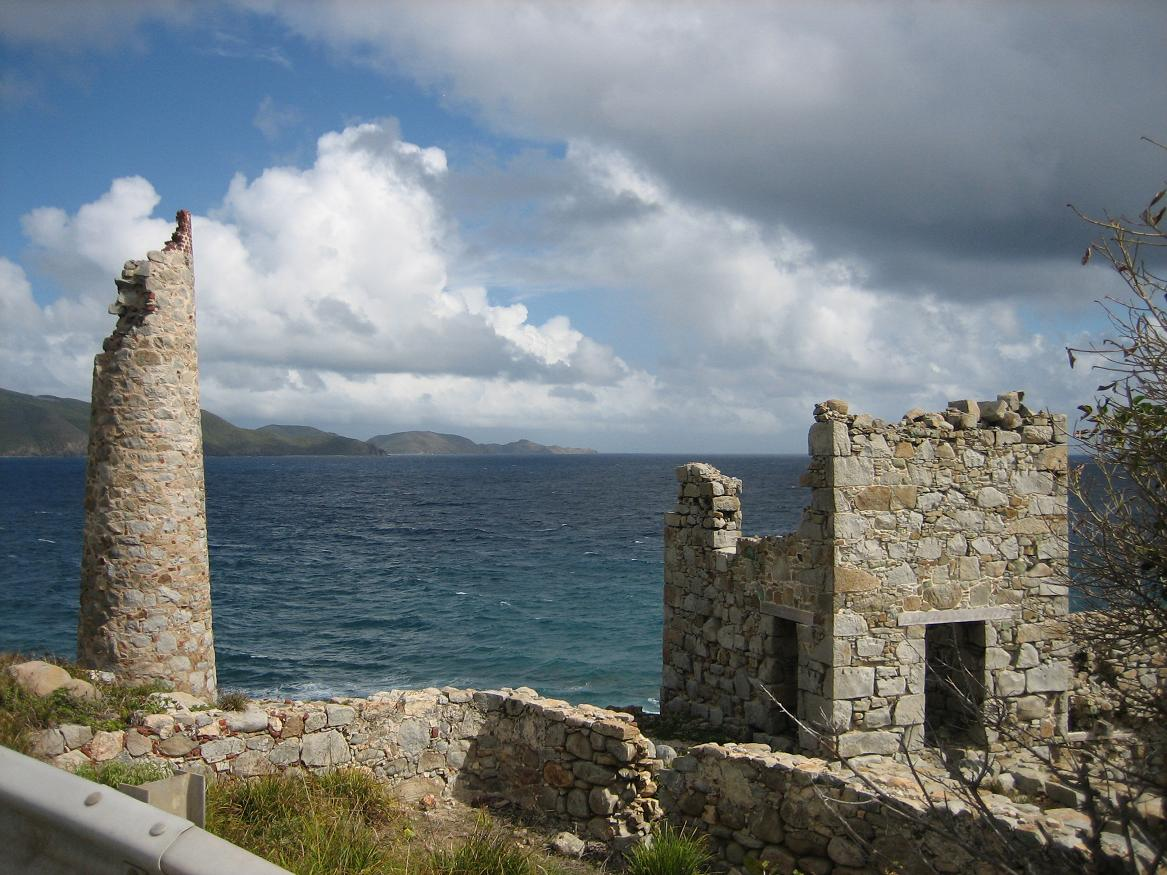
The ruins at Copper Mine point, Virgin Gorda

The Copper Mine on Virgin Gorda, British Virgin Islands, is a national park containing the ruins of an abandoned 19th-century copper mine.

== Early history ==
According to local lore, copper ore was first extracted by Spanish adventurers in the 1600s. There is no documentary evidence for this theory. However, in 1725, remnants of a ruined mine tunnel were discovered in Mine Hill.

After the islands came under British control, the Copper Mine was constructed in 1837 and its first shaft was sunk in 1838. In two separate periods over the next 24 years, 36 Cornish miners extracted ore from this site with the aid of some 140 British Virgin Islands workmen. The ore which was extracted was sent by road to Spanish Town (the largest settlement and harbour on Virgin Gorda) along coppermine road (originally built by the miners), and then by ship to Wales and; on the return trip the ships would carry provisions, wood for construction, wages for the workers, and coal with which to power their steam engine.

The mine was abandoned in 1862 and was never reopened. Parts of the original stack, the engine house, and the main building are all that remain. Several of the Cornish miners started families with native women and there are descendants living in the Virgin Islands to this day.

No plans are known to exist of the workings, however, it was recorded that by 1869 they were at a depth of 40 fathoms (240 ft) and that the levels extended under the sea.

== Beam engine ==
The beam engine at the Virgin Gorda copper mine is the oldest surviving Cornish beam engine in the world. The engine and beam were manufactured by the Perran Foundry, Cornwall, in 1836 and brought to the site in 1840 having previously worked at a mine in Cornwall. The beam is now located on the beach in Handsome Bay, Virgin Gorda.

The engine was of typical Cornish construction with a cylinder of 40 inches. It was the workhorse of the mine, being used to pump water from the mine, raise the copper ore up the shafts and to power the ore-dressing machinery. A Cornish boiler produced steam to drive the engine. These boilers were the first to use high-pressure steam and were invented in 1815 by the Cornish engineer Richard Trevithick (who also invented the first steam road locomotive).

== Today ==
The Copper Mine is a protected site and tourist attraction. However, it is in a perilous state, and sits in a position which is particularly exposed to hurricanes.

The Copper Mine Committee, in cooperation with the National Parks Trust of the British Virgin Islands, has undertaken to reconstruct the site using the footprint of the buildings and plans developed by archaeologists familiar with the work of these Cornish miners and their engineers. However, such plans have not been implemented.

== Minerals ==
Notwithstanding the abandoning of the mine, rich veins of copper are still visible on the point today, although not remotely in the quantities which would make modern commercial mining economic. Also, lying loosely around the site are various other rock specimens, including malachite, carbonate of copper; quartz containing copper-iron sulfide; and molybdenite. It has been suggested that a local cottage industry could have started making semiprecious jewellery.
