= Sugar Duties Acts 1846 =

Set of Acts of the Parliament of the United Kingdom

Sugar Duties (No. 2) Act 1846
- Act of Parliament
- Parliament of the United Kingdom
- Long title: An Act for granting to Her Majesty, until the Fifth Day of September One thousand eight hundred and forty-six, certain Duties on Sugar imported into the United Kingdom.
- Citation: 9 & 10 Vict. c. 41
- Territorial extent: United Kingdom

Dates
- Royal assent: 3 August 1846
- Commencement: 3 August 1846 (Note: The Acts of Parliament (Commencement) Act 1793.)
- Expired: 5 September 1846 (Note: Section 1.)
- Repealed: 18 August 1846
Other legislation
Repealed by	Sugar Duties (No. 3) Act 1846

Status: Repealed

Text of statute as originally enacted

Sugar Duties (No. 3) Act 1846
- Act of Parliament
- Parliament of the United Kingdom
- Long title: An Act for granting certain Duties on Sugar and Molasses.
- Citation: 9 & 10 Vict. c. 63
- Territorial extent: United Kingdom

Dates
- Royal assent: 18 August 1846
- Commencement: 18 August 1846
- Repealed: 6 August 1861
Other legislation
Repeals/revokes	Sugar Duties (No. 2) Act 1846
Repealed by	Statute Law Revision Act 1861

Status: Repealed

Text of statute as originally enacted

The Sugar Duties Acts 1846 (9 & 10 Vict. cc. 41 & 63) were acts of the Parliament of the United Kingdom which equalised import duties for sugar from British colonies. They were passed in 1846 at the same time as the repeal of the Corn laws by the Importation Act 1846 (9 & 10 Vict. c. 22). The acts, combined with the recent abolition of slavery, had a devastating effect on the profits of the Caribbean plantocracy, which had previously enjoyed reduced import duties. The Sugar Duties Act 1846 (c. 63) was a replacement for the Sugar Duties Act 1846 (c. 41).

With no cheap labour force and no preferential tariff protection, the plantation-owners in the British West Indies could not compete with Cuba and Brazil, where sugar was still produced using slave labour. The rise of European sugar beet as a cheap alternative to sugarcane further worsened their position. Plantation owners in the West Indies felt betrayed by the legislation, as they had understood that the tariff protection would remain in place as a quid pro quo for their agreement to the abolition of slavery eight years earlier.

The trade liberalization resulted in considerable consumption gains for British consumers and a reduced deadweight loss.

== Subsequent developments ==
The whole of both acts were repealed by section 1 of, and the schedule to, the Statute Law Revision Act 1861 (24 & 25 Vict. c. 101), which came into force on 6 August 1861.
