= Willem Hunthum =

Dutch merchant

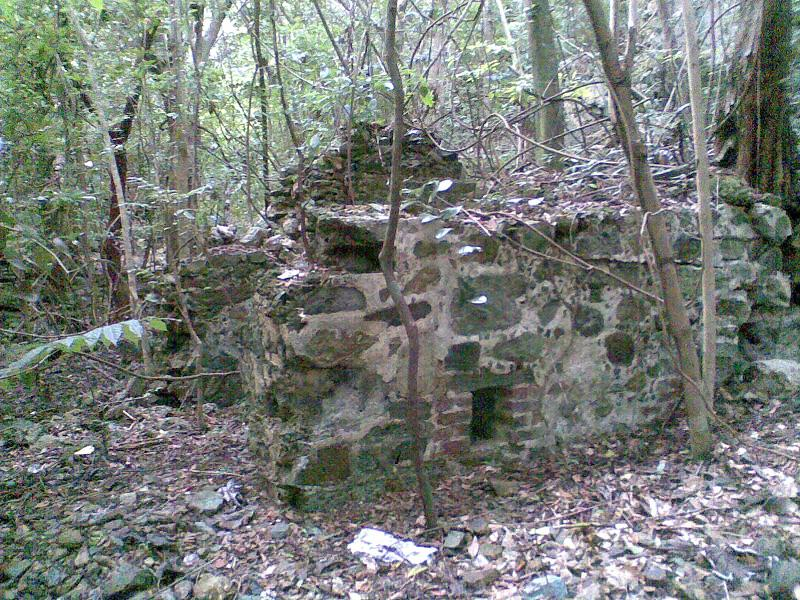
A ruin in Hunthum's Ghut, possibly of the original manor house.

Willem Hunthum was a Dutch merchant and the last legally recognised Dutch owner of Tortola in what later became the British Virgin Islands. Hunthum was regarded as either Patron or "Governor" of the Territory from 1663 to 1672 when control of the islands passed to the British in the Third Anglo-Dutch War. Hunthum died at some point between 1672 and 1678.

== Life ==
Details of Hunthum's life are relatively scant. Control of the islands was to pass to the British not long after Hunthum's acquisition of them, and the British asserted root of title to the islands dating back to certain patents granted to Earl of Carlisle for Tortola (as well as certain other islands) by King James I approximately 30 years earlier. Accordingly, records relating to Hunthum's title were at best ignored by the British, and possibly destroyed in support of their competing claim made against the Dutch throne later.

== Ownership of Tortola ==
Hunthum was a Rotterdam merchant, who purchased the property right to Tortola, and possibly certain other of the Virgin Islands, from the Dutch West India Company during the 1650s. It is believed that Hunthum's interest in the Territory related (or became related) primarily to the nascent trade in slaves rather than the agricultural opportunities to grow sugar and cotton.

In The Virgins: A Descriptive and Historical Profile it is asserted that after receiving a charter from the Danish crown, Erik Neilsen Schmidt, a Danish sea captain, took possession of neighbouring St. Thomas in 1666. Then "Hunthum, a Dutchman from Tortola, is reported to have landed in force on St. Thomas to break up the Danish occupation." The same text goes on to assert that in the same year "Dutch buccaneers were drive out of Tortola by a similar band of adventurers calling themselves English."

The British seized control of the islands in 1672 at the outbreak of the Third Anglo-Dutch War. By the end of the hostilities in 1678, Hunthum had died. It was not until 1684 that the Dutch ambassador, Arnout van Citters, formally requested the return of Tortola, and he did so based the claim on the private rights of the widow of Willem Hunthum.

But Tortola was never actually returned to the widow. Part of the problem was that Sir Nathaniel Johnson, the new Governor of the Leeward Islands, was ordered to restore the island to such person or persons who have "sufficient procuration or authority to receive the same..." However, there was no one apparent to restore the island to. In the event, Johnson did nothing.

Later, November 1696 a subsequent claim was made to the island by Sir Peter van Bell, the agent of Sir Joseph Shepheard, a Rotterdam merchant, who claimed to have purchased Tortola on 21 June 1695 for 3,500 guilders from Hunthum's estate.

== Legacy ==
Although Hunthum's interest in the islands was only very limited, he nonetheless achieved a form of legacy in the name of modern-day Hunthum's Ghut, a channel which divides Great Mountain from Fahie Hill, and also lends its name to the region of Road Town at its base.

There is also a ruin of a grand house higher up within the Ghut, accessible only by foot, and it is possible to conjecture that this was the grand house built by Hunthum to oversee his interests, although it is not clear that he ever actually stayed there.

== Images ==
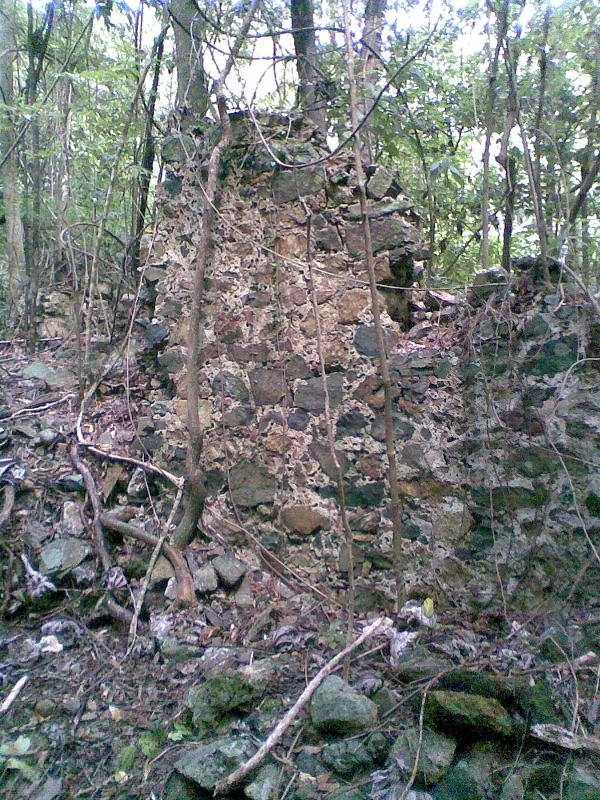

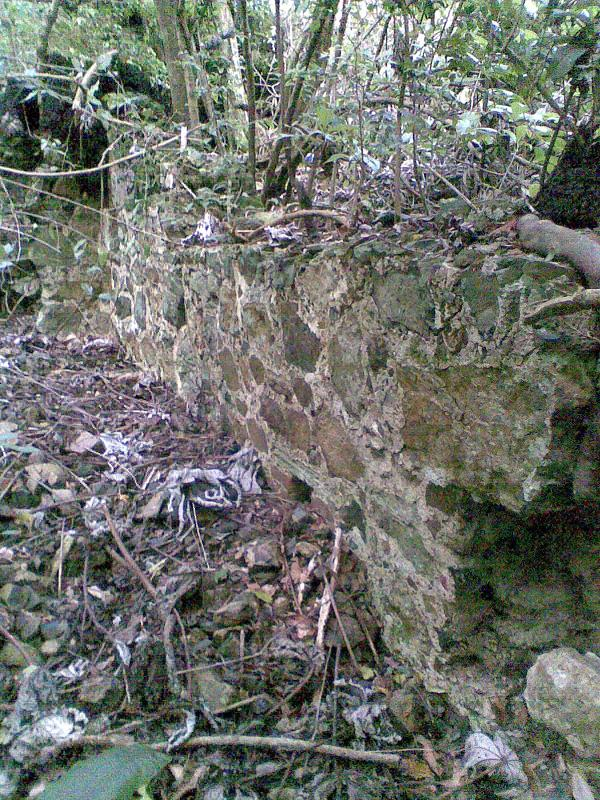

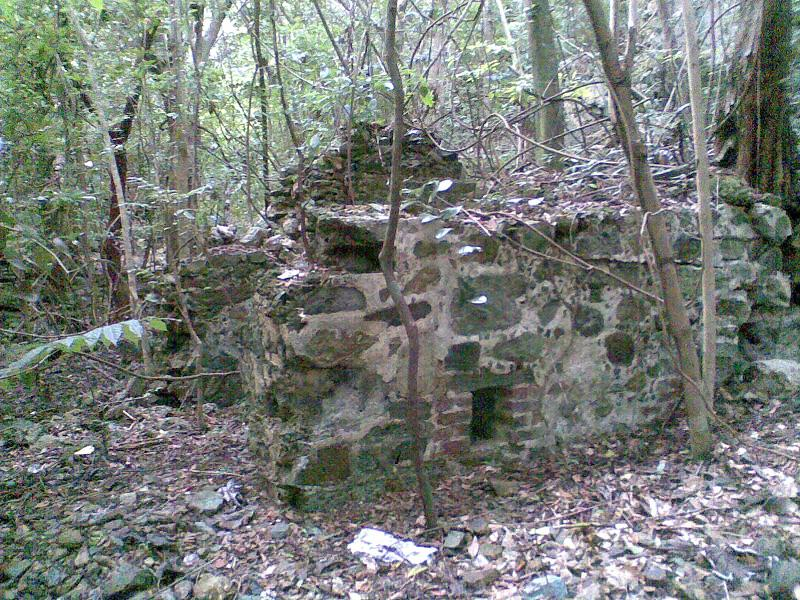

== See also ==
- History of the British Virgin Islands
