= Virgin Gorda =

Island of the British Virgin Islands

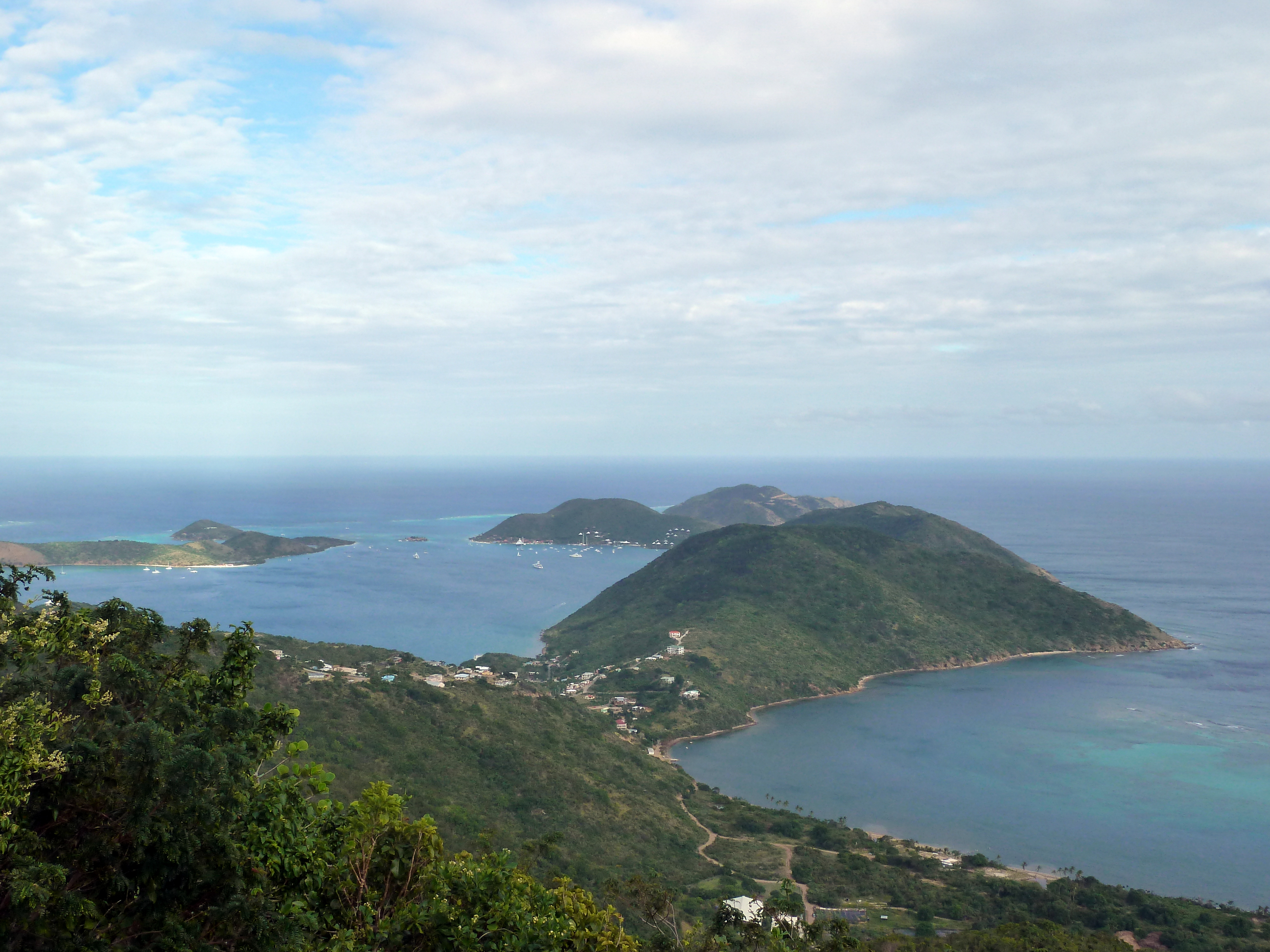
- Overlooking the North Sound, 2010

- The location of Virgin Gorda within the British Virgin Islands

- Location within British Virgin Islands Location within the Caribbean

Geography
- Location: Atlantic Ocean
- Coordinates: 18.47°N 64.40°W
- Archipelago: Virgin Islands

Administration
- United Kingdom
- British Overseas Territory: British Virgin Islands

Demographics
- Population: 3,930 (2010)

Additional information
- Time zone: AST (UTC-4)
- ISO code: VG

Virgin Gorda (/ˈvɜːrdʒɪn ˈɡɔːrdə/) is the third-largest (after Tortola and Anegada) and second-most populous island of the British Virgin Islands (BVI).

== Geography ==
Located at about 18 degrees, 30 minutes North, and 64 degrees, 30 minutes West, it covers an area of about 8 square miles (21 km^{2}).

The main commercial and residential area is Spanish Town on the southwestern part of the island.

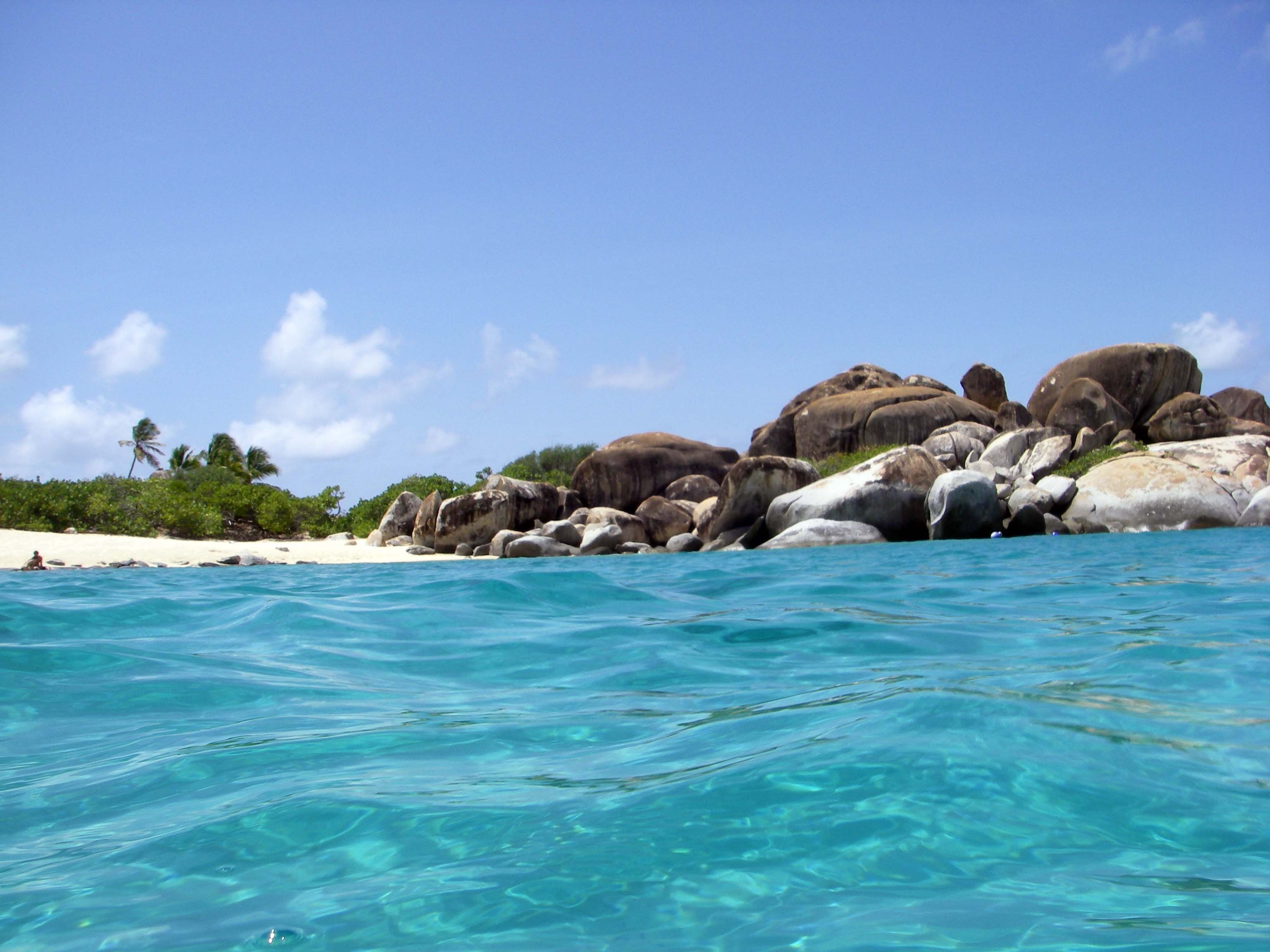
The Baths, 2013

An unusual geologic formation known as "The Baths", located on the southern end of the island, makes Virgin Gorda one of the BVI's major tourist destinations. At the Baths, in spite of evidence of the island's largely volcanic origins, huge granite boulders lie in piles on the beach, forming scenic grottoes that are open to the sea. Although formed from magma deep underground, granite is an intrusive rock rather than volcanic. It becomes visible at the Earth's surface only after long-term erosion removes the overlying material. Once exposed, weathering breaks the granite into large boulders and rounds their surfaces over time. North of the Baths is the Virgin Gorda Yacht Harbor, formerly owned by Little Dix Bay. The most notable ruin on Virgin Gorda is the old Copper Mine.

One of the great harbors of the world, North Sound, and historically Gorda Sound, lies at the northeast end of the island. It is bordered by four islands and connecting reef systems that keep the sound calm, creating one of the world's great watersports meccas, with over 3,000 acres (1,200 ha) of protected waters. At the eastern end of the sound is the premier anchorage, in the lee of Biras Hill (elevation 435 ft (133 m)). The village, resort, and marina at this point (Jon'O'Point) is called the Bitter End Yacht Club, and runs for about a mile of coastline.

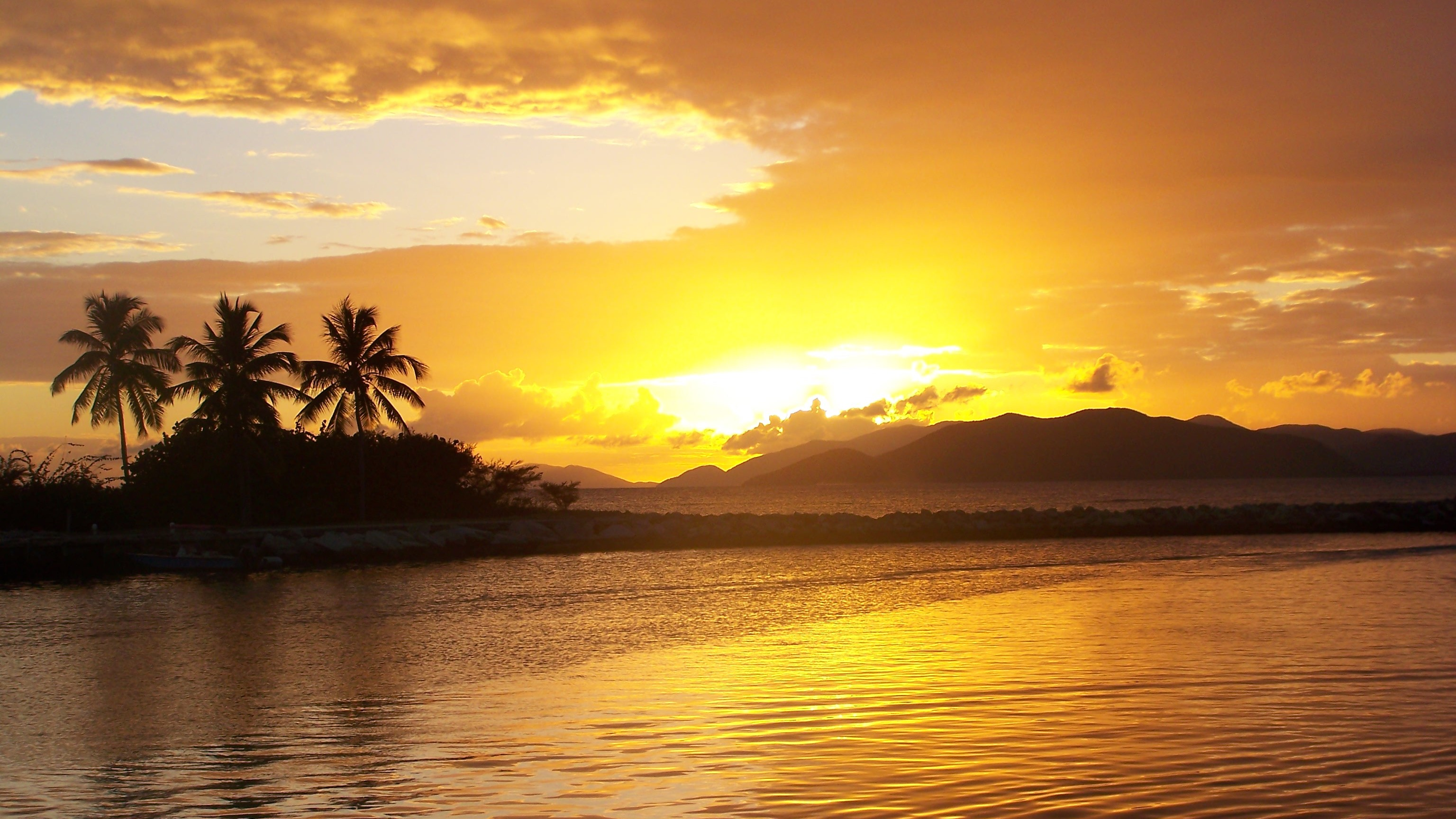
Sunset at Road Harbour, Virgin Gorda

== Etymology ==
Christopher Columbus is said to have called the island Virgen Gorda (Spanish for "fat virgin") because the island's profile on the horizon looks like a fat woman lying on her side. The island was previously called Paneston or Peniston (a linguistic corruption of the "Spanish Town").

== History ==
The island's earliest known settlers were the Taíno (also called Arawak) people, who migrated from South America between 100 and 300 CE. Evidence of Arawak settlements have been in Spanish Town. In the fifteenth century, the Taino were displaced by the Carib people.

In 1493, on his second voyage, Christopher Columbus sighted the island. The Spanish claimed Virgin Gorda and the other Virgin Islands, but never settled Virgin Gorda.

In the sixteenth century, the island's North Sound served as a strategic anchorage for the British Navy. Sir John Hawkins visited the island in the 1560s with a young Francis Drake aboard. Drake later anchored in the sound in 1585 prior to his raid on Santo Domingo. Hawkins and Drake returned to Virgin Gorda in 1595. In 1595, twenty-six ships anchored in the North Sound and used the large hill at Bitter End to practice for their attack on San Juan, to wrest Puerto Rico from Spain. With both admirals dying on the 1595/1596 voyage, the land at Bitter End may be the last place that these historical figures set foot on British soil.

In In 1631, the Dutch West India Company funded a settlement on Virgin Gorda, set up by Joost van Dyk, to mine copper on the island.

== Transportation ==
Marine ferry services from Tortola, St. Thomas, and St. John, as well as small commuter airlines, serve the island. In January 2010, Virgin Gorda Airport was restricted to a very small list of airlines by Air Safety Support International, the territory's aviation regulatory agency, which demanded that the airport be brought in line with international safety standards. The airport reopened in December 2010.

Tourists travel from neighboring islands such as Tortola and St. Thomas by boat and then return to these islands by boat in order to travel on scheduled passenger airlines flights operated into the Tortola Terrance B. Lettsome International Airport and St. Thomas Cyril E. King Airport.

== Education ==
The BVI operates several government schools. Virgin Gorda residents are served by Robinson O'Neal Memorial Primary School and Bregado Flax Educational Centre, a combined primary and secondary school that opened in 1982. In 2000 the government created plans to create a primary school on the island.

== Churches ==
- St. Ursula's Church, The Valley
