= BVI Bar Association =

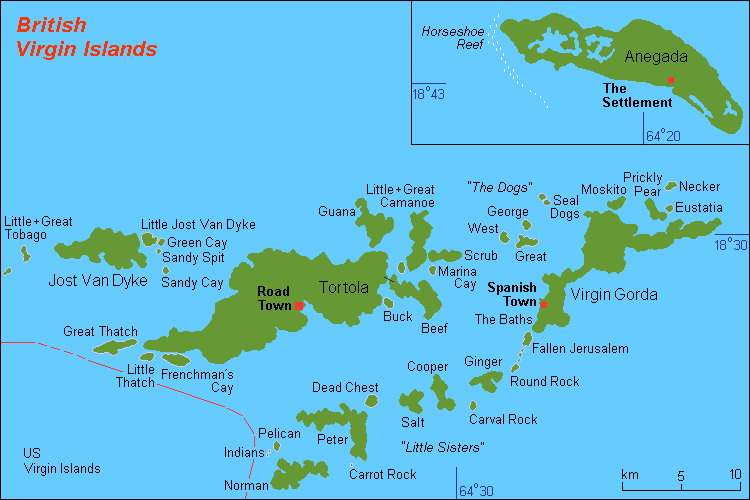
- Abbreviation: BVIBA
- Formation: 1976
- Type: Unincorporated association
- Legal status: Active
- Purpose: Professional association
- Region served: British Virgin Islands
- Official language: English
- President: Scott Tolliss

The BVI Bar Association is a voluntary membership organisation for members of the legal profession in the British Virgin Islands (BVI). The Association was founded on 8 May 1976. Of the eight founder members, half would go on to serve as president at some point. Residency requirements for members (and the fact that membership is entirely voluntary) mean that not all members of the British Virgin Islands legal profession are members. Most resident lawyers within the BVI do in fact join the BVI Bar Association, but it is relatively rare for non-resident lawyers to join (and most are not eligible to do so unless they hold Belonger status). The BVI Bar Association currently has no statutory functions and it is open to membership by both Barristers and Solicitors within the jurisdiction.

== Name ==
Although for historical reason the Association is referred to as the "Bar" Association, it has always been open to both barristers and solicitors. However, since 2015 the British Virgin Islands has had a fused profession, and all lawyers within the jurisdiction are now formally referred to as "legal practitioners".

In early drafts of the Legal Professions Act, 2015 the BVI Bar Association is referred to (incorrectly) as the "Virgin Islands Bar Association". The Government of the British Virgin Islands is keen to promote the use of the Territory's official name of the Virgin Islands (without the prefix "British") in all official documents and publications, and the error probably arose as a result of this process. Happily the error was corrected at the very final committee stage before the third reading of the Bill.

== Admission ==
Unlike most national bar associations, the BVI Bar Association does not represent all legal professionals within the jurisdiction. It is a voluntary organisation, and legal practitioners are not eligible to join until they have been resident in the Territory for at least one year (unless they hold Belonger status). This is designed to prevent flooding of the association by members of "transient" lawyers, who fly in, get admitted, and then leave the Territory and purport to practise British Virgin Islands law from overseas. From the perspective of the Association, this has created increasing problems as ever larger numbers of BVI qualified lawyers working for Offshore Magic Circle firms practise British Virgin Islands law from outside of the jurisdiction, meaning that the proportion of admitted BVI lawyers who are members of the BVI Bar Association has dwindled. Nonetheless, the Association is generally understood to speak for the profession as a whole within the jurisdiction, and frequently addresses the Territory's legislature on that basis.

== Legal Profession Act, 2015 ==
In March 2015 the British Virgin Islands legislature passed the Legal Profession Act, 2015. It was brought into force on 11 November 2015, but certain provisions relating to admission of English qualified lawyers and practice overseas were excluded from the proclamation bringing it into force. The new Act fundamentally recast the regulation of the profession within the jurisdiction. Key functions such as ethics, professional discipline, admission to practice and the validation of training institutions and pupillages would be delegated to a newly formed "Virgin Islands General Legal Council". The Act will fuse the profession so that all persons who are admitted to practice law in the Territory shall be known as "legal practitioners". Under the Act, legal practitioners will only be able to practice if they hold valid practising certificates.

Three seats on the General Legal Council are reserved for the BVI Bar Association. One is taken by the President, and the other two are taken by persons nominated by the Association. Each of the nominees must be at least five years' call, and one of them must be a Belonger.

The new admission criteria will treat British qualified lawyers less favourably than previously in two key respects. Firstly British qualified lawyers would only be eligible for admission if they hold full rights of audience before the British courts. Secondly, they would not be eligible for admission until they have five years prior professional practice experience. This is a significant change as under current BVI law they may be admitted as of right as soon as they qualify in the United Kingdom. In contrast, applicants who have trained at the University of the West Indies and a West Indian regional law school are eligible to be admitted even if they have never practised.

The Bill was finally passed after being introduced for the third time in 2015, after having previously been introduced and failing to proceed in 2007 and 2012. After finally being passed, it was brought into force eight months later.

== BVI Bar Council ==
The Association is run by the Bar Council under the leadership of the President.

=== Executive of the BVI Bar Association ===
The current executive or "Council" were elected in June 2024 for a one-year term.

Council of the BVI Bar Association (2024/2025)
| Title | Names | Firm |
|---|---|---|
| President | Mr. Scott Tolliss | Maples Group |
| 1st Vice President | Mr. Simon Hall | Carey Olsen |
| 2nd Vice President | Ms. Brittney Smith | Maples Group |
| Treasurer | Mr. Greg O’Keefe-Davies | Mourant |
| Secretary | Ms. Lauren Peaty | Withers |

=== Past Presidents ===
A total of sixteen persons have served as President of the BVI Bar Association, of whom eight have been men and eight have been women. Five of the sixteen Presidents were Queen's counsel, and the remaining Presidents were from the outer bar. The longest serving president to date has been J.S. Archibald, who served a total of eight years as president. Presidents are elected annually.

Presidents of the BVI Bar Association
| No. | Name | Firm | Dates |
|---|---|---|---|
| 1. | Mr. Lionel Barker | Barkers | 1976-1982 |
| 2. | Mr. McWelling Todman, CBE, QC | McW Todman & Co | 1982-1986 |
| 3. | Dr. Joseph S. Archibald, QC | J.S. Archibald & Co | 1986-1994 |
| 4. | Mr. Colin T.S. O'Neal | O'Neal Webster | 1994-1996 |
| 5. | Mr. Michael Riegels, QC | Harneys | 1996-1999 |
| 6. | Mr. Paul Webster, QC | O'Neal Webster | 1999-2001 |
| 7. | Mrs. Hélène-Anne Lewis | Morgan & Morgan | 2001-2003 |
| 8. | Mr. Paul Dennis, QC | O'Neal Webster | 2003-2006 |
| 9. | Mrs. Lisa Penn-Lettsome | Walkers | 2006-2008 |
| 10. | Mrs. Tana'ania Small-Davis | Farara Kerins | 2008-2010 |
| 11. | Ms. Keisha M. Durham | Harneys | 2010-2013 |
| 12. | Miss Arabella di Iorio | Maples & Calder | 2013–2015 |
| 13. | Ms. Jacqueline Daley-Aspinall | Harneys | 2015–2019 |
| 14. | Mrs. Kimberly Crabbe-Adams | Harneys | 2019–2022 |
| 15. | Ms. Marcia McFarlane | Harneys | 2022-2023 |
| 16. | Mr. Scott Tolliss | Maples & Calder | 2023-Present |

== See also ==
- Commonwealth Lawyers Association (CLA)
