= LGBTQ rights in the British Virgin Islands =

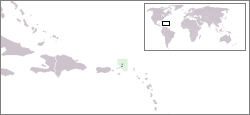
- British Virgin Islands
- Legal status: Legal since 2001
- Gender identity: No
- Military: Yes
- Discrimination protections: Yes, sexual orientation only

Family rights
- Recognition of relationships: No
- Adoption: No

Lesbian, gay, bisexual, transgender, and queer (LGBTQ) persons in the British Virgin Islands face legal challenges not experienced by non-LGBTQ residents. Same-sex sexual activity has been legal in the British Virgin Islands since 2001.

== Law regarding same-sex sexual activity ==
Before 2001, anal sex and oral sex for both heterosexuals and male homosexuals were criminal offences, referred to as "buggery" under the British Virgin Islands Criminal Code. Lesbian activity has never been illegal. Age of consent is set at 16, regardless of gender or sexual orientation.

Sexual acts between two consenting adults in private were expressly decriminalized by an Order in Council in the British Virgin Islands (and other British Overseas Territories) by the British Government pursuant to Sections 3(1) and 3(7) of the Caribbean Territories (Criminal Law) Order, 2000. According to section 4 of the order, the law has retrospective effect. There are two exceptions to the law: group sex and sex in public remain criminal offences and may also lead to charges under gross indecency and other minor sexual offence laws.

As a British Overseas Territory, the British Virgin Islands Government is required to comply with their obligations under international human rights instruments. Specifically, this includes an adherence to the European Convention on Human Rights, which highlight a responsibility to ensure non-discrimination and equality. The European Convention on Human Rights has been recognised by the courts as having legal effect in the jurisdiction.

== Recognition of same-sex relationships ==
Recognition of same-sex unions in the Lesser Antilles and Puerto Rico Same-sex marriage Unregistered cohabitation Island subject to IACHR advisory opinion No recognition of same-sex couples Constitutional ban on same-sex marriage Same-sex sexual activity illegal but penalties not enforced

Same-sex marriages and civil unions are not legal in the British Virgin Islands. The British Virgin Islands is an extremely religious society, and no discussion relating to legalisation has yet occurred in the House of Assembly.

In 2015, Premier Orlando Smith, whilst affirming his personal opposition to same-sex marriage, indicated that he is open to public consultation on the issue. However, the Marriage (Amendment) Act 2017 made no provision for same-sex marriages, and politicians speaking in the House of Assembly took time to comment on the absence of such provisions and express hostility to same-sex marriage and LGBTQ people more broadly.

Church leaders have indicated hostility towards the possibility of legalisation, and political leaders have taken an unsympathetic approach in public. His Majesty's Government has confirmed that it will not impose recognition of same-sex marriages in the British Virgin Islands by way of an Order in Council.

In 2021 a local couple sought a judicial review challenging the constitutionality of the refusal to recognise their same-sex marriage (celebrated in the United Kingdom). The proceeding was stayed pending the outcome of appeals to the Privy Council in two cases involving Bermuda and the Cayman Islands, though evidentiary proceedings were continued in July 2022 as the government defended the island's statute banning same-sex marriage in the court. In 2021, the Court of Appeal, ruled that same-sex marriage in the British Virgin Islands can be introduced only through legislative body and not through courts. In December 2022 the Premier of the British Virgin Islands Natalio Wheatley announced the government would seek to pass legislation authorising it to hold a referendum on same-sex marriage and expansion of domestic partnership rights in 2023.

In 2024, the Constitutional Review Commission's report recommended government to ban same-sex marriage in the Virgin Islands. In June 2026, the Premier Natalio Wheatley told the government's intention to allow civil partnership instead of same-sex marriage.

== Discrimination protections ==
The 2007 Constitution prohibits discrimination against people on the basis of sexual orientation:

Whereas every person in the Virgin Islands is entitled to the fundamental rights and freedoms of the individual;
Whereas those fundamental rights and freedoms are enjoyed without distinction of any kind, such as sex, race, colour, language, religion, political or other opinion, national, ethnic or social origin, association with a national minority, property, family relations, economic status, disability, age, birth, sexual orientation, marital or other status, subject only to prescribed limitations;

"Discriminatory" means affording different treatment to different persons on any ground such as sex, race, colour, language, religion, political or other opinion, national, ethnic or social origin, association with a national minority, property, family relations, economic status, disability, age, birth, sexual orientation, marital or other status

== Living conditions ==
The British Virgin Islands is a conservative and religious society. Open displays of affection between same-sex partners may offend, and LGBTQ people generally keep their sexual orientation a secret and stay in the closet. There are reports of same-sex couples and LGBTQ people being harassed and even physically attacked. Some of these violent attacks have been justified or excused by locals as simply "following the Bible".

== Summary table ==
Same-sex sexual activity legal	Yes (Since 2001)
Equal age of consent (16)	Yes (Since 2001)
Anti-discrimination laws in employment	Yes (Since 2007)
Anti-discrimination laws in the provision of goods and services	Yes (Since 2007)
Anti-discrimination laws in all other areas (incl. indirect discrimination, hate speech)	Yes (Since 2007)
Same-sex marriages	No
Recognition of same-sex couples	No
Stepchild adoption by same-sex couples	No
Joint adoption by same-sex couples	No
LGBTQ allowed to serve openly in the military	Yes (Responsibility of the United Kingdom)
Right to change legal sex	No
Access to IVF for lesbians	No
Commercial surrogacy for gay male couples	No (Banned for heterosexual couples as well)
MSMs allowed to donate blood	No

== See also ==
- Human rights in the British Virgin Islands
- LGBT rights in the Americas
- LGBT rights in the United Kingdom
- Recognition of same-sex unions in the British Overseas Territories
- LGBT rights in the United States Virgin Islands
