= Law of the British Virgin Islands =

The law of the British Virgin Islands is a combination of common law and statute, and is based heavily upon English law.

Law in the British Virgin Islands tends to be a combination of the very old and the very new. As a leading offshore financial centre, the territory has extremely modern statutes dealing with company law, insolvency, banking law, trust law, insurance and other related matters. However, in a number of areas of law, such as family law, the laws of the British Virgin Islands are based upon very old English laws, and can cause some difficulty in modern times. Other areas of law, such as international law, are essentially regulated externally through the Foreign and Commonwealth Office in London by Order in Council. A large body of the laws of the British Virgin Islands consists of the common law, which continually updates itself through judicial precedent in the territory and in other common law countries.

The British Virgin Islands is a dependent territory of the United Kingdom. Although the local legislature and courts are independent from the United Kingdom, the British government deals with most international relations on behalf of the territory, although authority has been delegated to the territory to negotiate on its own behalf in certain areas (see below under Constitutional law). The British Virgin Islands does not have a separate vote at the United Nations.

== Legal history ==
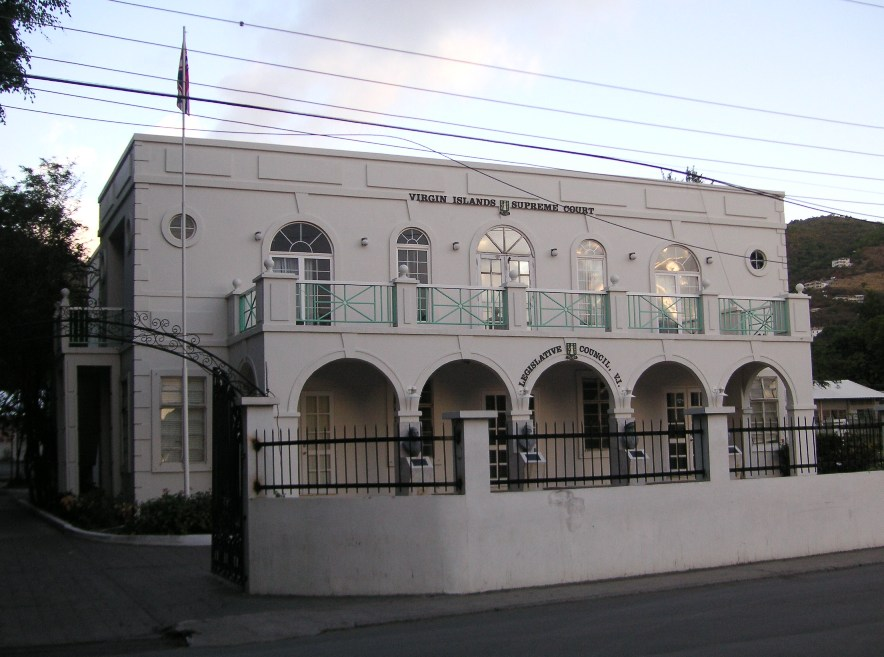
The Virgin Islands Supreme Court

The early legal history of the British Virgin Islands is somewhat hampered by the fact that in the days of colonisation, it was often unclear who controlled the islands. The islands were first settled in modern times by the Dutch, but in 1628 the English crown granted patents for the settlement of what is now the British Virgin Islands to Lord Willoughby. The British expelled the Dutch in 1672 during the Third Anglo-Dutch War, but later evinced an intention to return the islands to the Dutch. They later resiled from this position and in 1698 the British government took the view that the territory was a British possession (see generally: History of the British Virgin Islands).

It was not until 1773 that the British Virgin Islands actually had its own legislature. Prior to that date laws were extended to the territory by the legislature of the Leeward Islands in Antigua. Some of these laws are still in force in the British Virgin Islands, such as the Common Law (Declaration of Application) Act (Cap 13), which dates from 1705. Doubts as to the validity of those statutes were removed by the Colonial Laws Validity Act 1865.

The Legislative Assembly first sat on 27 January 1774, however, it took a full further decade for a constitutional framework to be settled. Part of the problem was that the islands were so thinly populated, it was almost impossible to constitute the organs of government.

In 1776 George Suckling was appointed as Chief Justice, although he did not arrive until 1778, due to political maneuvering in the territory. Having arrived, the legislature eventually got rid of Suckling by declining to pass the Court Bill. The first law ever to be passed by a local legislature in the British Virgin Islands concerned punishments for runaway slaves. The second provided a mechanism for settling longstanding boundary disputes. Both no doubt reflected the concerns of the islands free inhabitants.

But the Governor-General refused to assent to any bills until a Court Bill was passed. Bills passed by the Legislative Assembly needed to be approved by the Governor-General in Antigua, and early legislation was often vetoed. Laws could also still be passed by the Legislative Assembly of the Leeward Islands under a quasi-federal system, and these applied to all of the British territories in the Leeward Islands. However, the Governor-General used this veto force the Virgin Islands to pass legislation establishing a court.

Eventually the Court Bill was passed in 1783 together with a Bill validating titles as a form of compromise. Nonetheless, it took some time to obtain a Chief Justice whose appointment could be confirmed.

In 1867 the territory obtained its first ever written constitution in the form of the Constitution Ordinance, which abolished the previous legislative assembly and provided for a new legislative council. However, abolition of slavery and a collapse in sugar prices in the 19th century lead to the virtual economic ruin of the islands, and although the legislature limped along for some time, it was eventually formally dissolved in 1901. After the famous march of 1947 the legislature was restored in 1950, and permanent self-government was devolved in 1967. The main purpose of the 1950 Constitution was to re-devolve power back to the reformed Legislative Council in the British Virgin Islands from the Governor of the Leeward Islands. Historically it is regarded a holding measure; a part of the process that eventually led to the more fundamental constitutional government in 1967.

The British Government had hoped that after the Leeward Islands Federation was abolished in 1956 the British Virgin Islands would join the new Federation of the West Indies, but there was little enthusiasm for that, and so eventually the 1967 Constitution was promulgated. The 1967 Constitution was eventually replaced by a revised and updated Constitution in 1976, and the 1976 Constitution was amended at various points, and then in turn superseded in 2007 by the current form.

=== Arthur Hodge ===
In international terms, probably the most significant event which occurred in the territory's legal history was the trial and execution of Arthur William Hodge for the murder of a slave; the only time a British subject was ever executed for killing a slave.

== Sources of law ==
=== Common law and equity ===
Principles of English common law and equity are extended to the British Virgin Islands by statute.

The Common Law (Declaration of Application) Act (Cap 13) provides:

That the Common Law of England, as far as it stands unaltered by any writ[t]en Laws of these Islands, or some of them, confirmed by Your Majesty ... is in force in each of these your Majesty's Leeward Charibee [Caribbean] Islands...

The Eastern Caribbean Supreme Court (Virgin Islands) Act (Cap 80) provides:

In all matters in which there was formerly or is any conflict or variance between the rules of equity and the rules of common law with reference to the same matter the rules of equity shall prevail.

=== Legislation ===
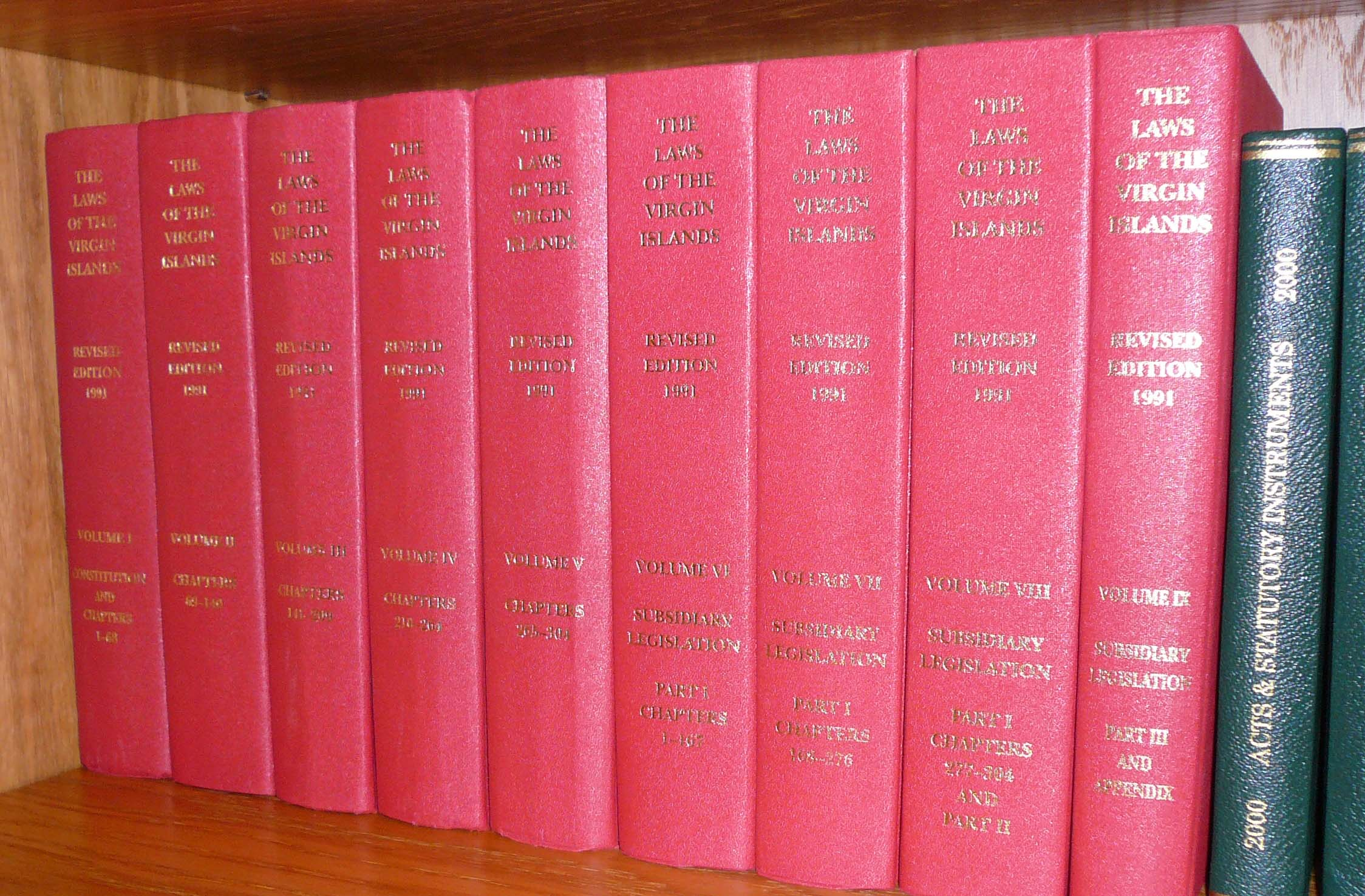
Revised Laws of the Virgin Islands, 1991

Local statutes are passed by the House of Assembly in the British Virgin Islands. Statutes are subject to Royal Assent by the Governor as the King's representative in the territory, but a refusal to grant Royal Assent has never yet occurred in the jurisdiction during the modern era.

Periodically, the statutes of the British Virgin Islands are consolidated and issued as the Revised Laws of the Virgin Islands. This was most recently done in 1991. In such revisions, all laws are given a specific chapter number (usually abbreviated to "Cap."). Hence the Limitation Act is usually cited as the Limitation Act (Cap 43). Legislation passed after 1991 is usually referred to by year, so the Merchant Shipping Act is usually referred to as the Merchant Shipping Act, 2001, but may be referred to in long form as the Merchant Shipping Act (No 13 of 2001).

On several occasions since 1991 there has been discussion of producing a new revised set of the laws of the Virgin Islands, and in 2014 legislation was passed to facilitate the process.

=== Orders in Council ===
Orders in Council are a form of promulgated legislation issued by the British Government. Usually they deal with routine matters which it would be impractical to burden the local legislature with, such as implementing United Nations Security Council resolutions into law. Various other highly technical aspects of legislation are dealt with by way of Order in Council; for example, all of the jurisdiction's laws relating to civil aviation are promulgated in this manner.

However, orders-in-council are also sometimes used by the United Kingdom government to push through measures which are unpopular locally, and would be difficult to pass using the normal democratic process. Recent examples of this include the abolition of the death penalty for murder in 1991 with the Caribbean Territories (Abolition of Death Penalty for Murder) Order 1991, and the decriminalisation of homosexuality in 2000.

== Specific legal subjects ==
=== Commercial law ===
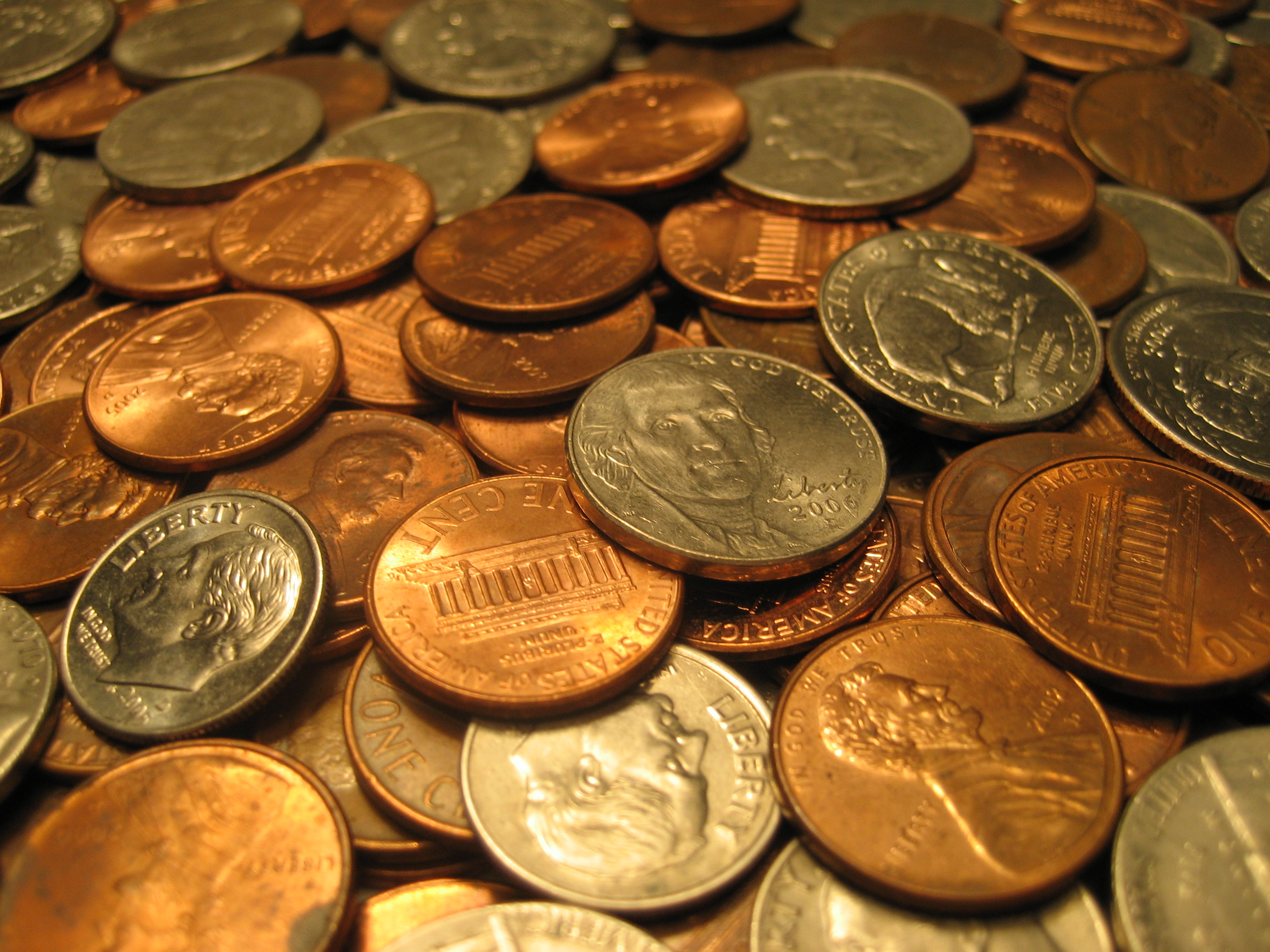
Commercial law is given major emphasis by the territory's legislative process.

Generally speaking, commercial law, including insolvency law, is relatively well developed in the British Virgin Islands. New legislation has been introduced to try to foster e-commerce in the jurisdiction. Other legislation is slightly variable; legislation relating to arbitration and bills of exchange date from the nineteenth century, but still operate effectively. Some legislation needs updating. The Conveyancing and Law of Property Act (Cap 220) dates from 1961, and still contains provisions clarifying when a wife may hold property in her own name.

==== Competition law ====
In the British Virgin Islands, there is almost no competition law to speak of. In fact, the position is actually the reverse. A number of specific statutory monopolies are protected and preserved by legislation in the territory, and in other areas, new entrants to the markets are carefully scrutinised, and may be barred from entering where they might provide competition for local businesses.

==== Company law ====
The British Virgin Islands has one of the most sophisticated company law codes in the world. Up until 1984 all incorporations in the British Virgin Islands were made under the Companies Act (Cap 285), which was originally passed in 1885. In 1984, the territory incorporated the International Business Companies Act, which provided a sophisticated and updated legal structure in which to incorporate international business companies, and was widely copied by other tax havens. In 2004, the BVI Business Companies Act, 2004 was incorporated, and for a year it was possible to incorporate a company under any of the three acts. However, from 1 January 2006 it was no longer possible to incorporate under the International Business Companies Act (which was subsequently repealed), and from 1 January 2008 it will no longer be possible to incorporate under the Companies Act, leaving the BVI Business Companies Act, 2004 as the sole corporate statute.

The BVI Business Companies Act is based largely on New Zealand company law, but has been modified to include many of the characteristic features of offshore financial centres (such as removing restrictions on financial assistance and thin capitalisation, and permitting distribution in specie). It has also adopted some slightly novel and radical steps, such as abolishing the concept of share capital and rules relating to share premium. Some of these developments were a little advanced even for the offshore market, and have taken some time to bed down. The Act has now been copied wholesale by the Isle of Man, and it remains to be seen if the act becomes as widely copied as the old International Business Companies Act.

It is also possible to form limited liability partnerships in the British Virgin Islands under the Partnership Act, 1996.

==== Insolvency law ====
The law relating to insolvency, bankruptcy and liquidation is regulated by the Insolvency Act, 2003 and the Insolvency Rules, 2005 in the British Virgin Islands. The act is broadly based upon the Insolvency Act 1986 of the United Kingdom (without the changes brought into effect by the UK's Enterprise Act 2002), but modified in certain specific regards in relation to the jurisdiction's role as an offshore centre. The Insolvency Act is "predicated heavily towards the protection of secured creditors' rights". The legislation includes the ISDA model netting laws to facilitate set-off upon a credit event in derivatives transactions. It also contains specific "safe harbour" provisions relating to vulnerable transactions (principally undervalue transactions, unfair preferences and voidable floating charges) on an insolvency, to protect structured finance transactions.

==== Financial services ====
A substantial body of British Virgin Islands law is dedicated to the regulation of what are collectively referred to as financial services. This broadly means offshore business which requires specific regulation. The key statutes dealing with financial services are:

- Securities and Investment Business Act, 2010
- Banks and Trust Companies Act, 1990
- Insurance Act, 2008
- Company Management Act, 1990
- Financing and Money Services Act, 2009

Financial services in the British Virgin Islands are regulated by the BVI Financial Services Commission (usually abbreviated to FSC).

==== Tax law ====
The British Virgin Islands has almost no taxation. Although there is technically income tax in the British Virgin Islands, the effective rate is zero. There is no capital gains tax, gift tax, sales tax, value added tax or inheritance tax. The only real tax burdens imposed in the jurisdiction are:

- Payroll tax on employees within the territory.
- Stamp duty, which usually only applies to transfers of land, and transfers of shares in companies which own land.
- Customs import duty.
- Land tax and house tax.
- Various minor ancillary taxes and permit fees.

The British Virgin Islands generally appears on most lists of recognised tax havens.

=== Constitutional law ===
The British Virgin Islands is currently organised under its fourth constitution, promulgated in 2007, which represents a sizeable turnover given that the first was only obtained in 1950. The most recent constitution came into effect fully after the 2007 general election. By 2010 the Premier at the time, Ralph O'Neal, had already called for a further constitutional review.

The British Virgin Islands constitution focuses heavily on a distinct cultural identity, contains commitments to uphold human rights and the rule of law, and professes a national belief in God. Despite the strong professed protection of human rights and equal treatment, the constitution expressly preserves the right to discriminate against non-belongers in relation to taxation and employment. The constitution also calls for the formation of a number of committees to promote the constitutional development on the territory, most of which have never been formed.

Pursuant to a "letter of entrustment" dated 13 June 2007 the British government has devolved wide discretion to the government of the territory to manage its own external affairs, and adds that the British government would give "sympathetic consideration" for requests to take action on other matters.

=== Contract law ===
British Virgin Islands contract law is almost entirely based upon English common law. The British Virgin Islands has no equivalent of the Contracts (Rights of Third Parties) Act 1999, and applies strict privity of contract. Similarly there is no equivalent to the Unfair Contract Terms Act 1977 in the territory.

=== Criminal law ===
In 1997, almost all of the criminal law of the territory was consolidated into a single piece of legislation, the Criminal Code, 1997. Although it was generally regarded as desirable to consolidate all of the criminal laws into a single source, some criticisms have been made at the "warts and all" approach taken to common law offences. For example, in relation to the law of rape, the code provides that a man cannot be guilty of raping his wife, even though this has not been the rule at common law since 1991.

Generally speaking, most serious criminal offences in the jurisdiction are dealt with under the same principles as the original English common law, and specific English Victorian statutes (such as the Offences Against the Person Act, 1861).

The death penalty was abolished for murder in 1991 (controversially), and was subsequently also removed for the last remaining offences (piracy and treason) in 2001.

=== Family law ===
In international terms family law is relatively underdeveloped in the British Virgin Islands. Levels of maintenance payments are fixed by out of date statutory provisions which mean that levels of support after divorce or separation are derisorily low. Unmarried fathers have relatively little statutory protection in relation to paternal rights. Illegitimate children have no right to inherit upon an intestacy.

=== Property law ===
Property law in the British Virgin Islands has only ever undergone spasmodic and periodic reform. The principal legislation dealing with property rights is the Conveyancing and Law of Property Act (Cap 220), which is based on much earlier English legislation. Tacit recognition that this legislation needs updating is found in the BVI Business Companies Act, 2004, which (to assist structured finance transactions) provides that in relation to a security interest over shares in a British Virgin Islands company, the parties may completely exclude the effect of the Conveyancing and Law of Property Act.

In relation to real estate, the British Virgin Islands adopted a Torrens registration system in the early 1970s, which considerably simplified domestic conveyancing. The Cadastral survey of the islands was completed in 1972, and the new system was almost fully implemented by 1974. Non-residents wishing to purchase property in the British Virgin Islands must obtain a Non-Belongers Land Holding License.

=== Tort ===
British Virgin Islands tort law is largely based upon English common law.

=== Trusts and equity ===
The British Virgin Islands law relating to trusts and equity is derived directly from English law, but has been modified by legislation to reflect the position of the territory as an offshore financial centre. The usual features for offshore trusts are all empowered by statute in the territory - non-charitable purpose trusts, extended perpetuity periods, abrogation of the rule in Bartlett v Barclays Bank and widened investment powers.

The leading Privy Council decision on "imperfect gifts" in T Choithram International SA v Pagarani [2001] 2 All ER 492 was an appeal from the British Virgin Islands courts.

=== Other legal disciplines ===
- Arbitration - Arbitration in the British Virgin Islands is regulated by the Arbitration Act, 2013.
- Labour law - the British Virgin Islands labour law has been entirely designed around protecting the local workforce from outside competition. Any person who does not have belonger status requires either a work permit or an exemption; local employers are prohibited from employing foreigners where there is a suitably qualified local person. Labour law in the territory is codified into a single statute, the Labour Code, 2010.
- Immigration law - similarly, the British Virgin Islands takes an extremely restrictive position in relation to immigration. Even birth in the country is not sufficient to grant belongers status (unless the person is born to parents who are themselves belongers). It is possible to be naturalised after a period of long residence, but it is rare to be naturalised after less than 25 years, and often much longer. The British Virgin Islands government has announced as policy that it will only naturalise 25 new belongers each year. Laws in the British Virgin Islands openly discriminate against non-belongers. For example, stamp duty on the purchase of land is 4% for belongers and 12% for non-belongers.
- Investigatory laws - because of its position as an offshore financial centre, the British Virgin Islands has regulatory responsibilities which are out of all proportion with its size or economy. The result has been a raft of legislation designed to investigate and curb unlawful tax evasion, money laundering and terrorist financing. The unfortunate result of this is a patchwork quilt of rules of regulations that are extremely complex to follow, even for experienced practitioners and judges. Some of the laws reflect bilateral agreements with specific countries, some relate to specific times of crime, and some have generic application. Unfortunately a raft of conflicting international agreements, initiatives and treaties with conflicting standards and aims, any kind of rationalisation or consolidation seems wholly improbable.

== Human rights ==
In practice, basic human rights are broadly respected in the British Virgin Islands. Repression of freedom of speech, interference with democracy or the rule of law, and arbitrary arrest and torture are virtually unknown. The territory has been described as “generally free of human rights abuses” and its government has been characterised as taking “a strong and proactive approach to the protection of human rights.”

However, the laws in the British Virgin Islands do openly discriminate against people who do not hold what is called “belonger status.” This form of discrimination is expressly preserved in the BVI constitution, which excludes non-belongers from the full scope of its non-discrimination protections.

== Legal institutions ==
=== Executive ===
Under the British Virgin Islands constitution, executive power is vested in the Monarch, and exercised through the Governor. The constitution also provides for the composition of the Cabinet (referred to under former constitutions as the Executive Council, often still abbreviated locally to "ExCo"). This consists of the Premier, the Attorney General and four other ministers. The Governor normally attends and presides over meetings of the Cabinet.

The constitution reserves certain key functions to the Governor, including:

1. external affairs, subject to certain specifically excluded matters;
2. defence, including the armed forces;
3. internal security, including the Police Force;
4. the terms and conditions of service of persons holding or acting in public offices; and
5. the administration of the courts.

The Governor retains a prerogative power of pardon, and certain other specific prerogative powers under the constitution.

=== Legislature ===
The British Virgin Islands legislature consists of the House of Assembly of the British Virgin Islands (known under previous constitutions as the Legislative Council of the British Virgin Islands, often still abbreviated locally to "LegCo"), and is headed by the Monarch. The Legislative Council consists of 13 elected members; nine tied to electoral districts, and four "at large" seats. Belonger status is a requirement to be elected to the Legislative Council.

=== Judiciary ===
Low level disputes and petty crimes in the British Virgin Islands are resolved in the magistrates' court. More serious matters are dealt with in the high court.

The British Virgin Islands is part of the Eastern Caribbean Supreme Court circuit. Unusually for its size, the British Virgin Islands has two permanent judges. The British Virgin Islands hosts the Commercial Court of the East Caribbean Supreme Court, which was opened on 9 April 2009. Justice Edward Bannister QC was sworn in, and after initially sitting in temporary accommodation, the new Commercial Court building was officially opened on 4 November 2009.

Appeals from the High Court lie to the Eastern Caribbean Court of Appeal. Final appeal lies to the Privy Council. Unusually, the British Virgin Islands is one of the relatively few jurisdictions in the region which is opposed to the Caribbean Court of Justice. The British Virgin Islands Bar Association has always expressed a strong disinclination to abandon a right of final appeal to the Privy Council.

=== Legal profession ===
The legal profession is regulated by the Virgin Islands General Legal Council, and the principal statute dealing with the profession is the Legal Profession Act 2015. However the legislation has been fraught with difficulties and has already been amended by three times. Further, key appointments under the legislation - including the appointment of a disciplinary tribunal, have still not been made.

The legal profession in the British Virgin Islands is a fused profession. Most resident lawyers in the Territory are also members of the BVI Bar Association, although that is a voluntary association and does not of itself have any power to regulate.

=== Law reform ===
The British Virgin Islands has a dedicated Law Commission for the purposes of reviewing and revising the laws of the territory.
