= Walkers (law firm) =

Multi-jurisdictional offshore law firm

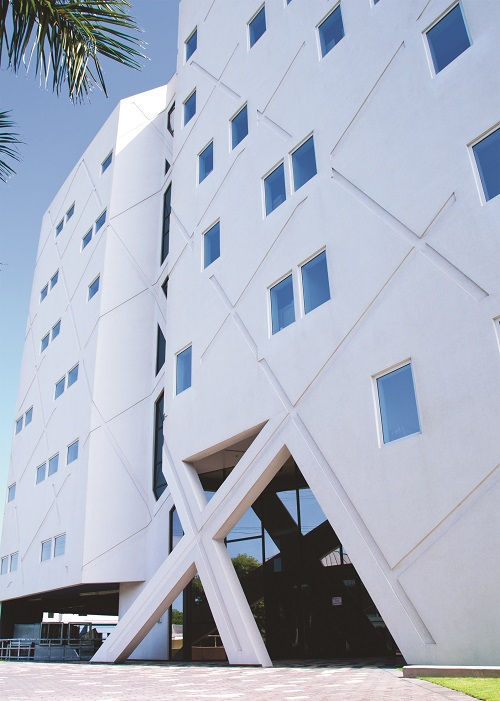
Walkers' Cayman Islands office at 190 Elgin Avenue, George Town, Grand Cayman.

Walkers is an international legal and professional services firm headquartered in the Cayman Islands. Walkers provides legal, corporate, compliance and fiduciary services to global corporations, financial institutions, capital markets participants and investment fund managers.

Walkers practices the laws of six jurisdictions (Bermuda, British Virgin Islands, Cayman Islands, Guernsey, Jersey and Ireland) from ten offices globally in Bermuda, the British Virgin Islands, Cayman Islands, Dubai, Guernsey, Hong Kong, Ireland, Jersey, London and Singapore.

== History ==
The firm was founded in 1964 by Bill Walker (under the name W.S. Walker & Co.) shortly after Jamaican independence in 1962. Walkers is generally accepted as being the oldest Caymanian law firm, older than rivals Maples and Calder by about two years. The firm moved into its current headquarters, at 190 Elgin Avenue, in 2013.

In late 2007, discussions became public about a proposed merger between Walkers and Jersey-based Mourant du Feu & Jeune. However, in February 2008 the two firms announced that they were no longer pursuing merger talks.

In March 2012, Walkers announced it was selling its fiduciary business, Walkers Management Services, to the Intertrust Group. In May 2015, Walkers announced the establishment of a new fiduciary business called Walkers Professional Services (WPS).

In December 2025, Walkers announced it was heading into a strategic partnership with Vitruvian Partners.

== Rankings ==
Walkers is ranked in most jurisdictions where it practices, across various international legal directories. Between 2025 and 2026, Walkers's ratings include:

	Practice Area	Ranking/Position
Chambers Global
Asia Pacific	Offshore	Band 1
Bermuda	Corporate and Finance	Band 1
	Dispute Resolution	Band 1
	Insurance	Band 2
British Virgin Islands	Corporate and Finance including Investment Funds	Band 1
	Dispute Resolution	Band 1
Cayman Islands	Corporate and Finance	Band 1
	Dispute Resolution	Band 1
	Financial Services: Regulatory	Band 1
	Investment Funds	Band 1
Global: Multi-Jurisdictional	Offshore	Band 1
Guernsey	Dispute Resolution	Band 1
	Corporate and Finance including Investment Funds	Band 2
	Trusts	Band 2
Ireland	Banking and Finance: Asset Finance	Band 2
	Capital Markets: Debt	Band 2
	International Capabilities	Band 2
	Investment Funds	Band 2
Jersey	Corporate and Finance	Band 1
	Dispute Resolution	Band 2
	Investment Funds	Band 2
	Trusts	Band 2
UK	Offshore: Bermudian, British Virgin Islands and Cayman Islands Law (UK)	Band 1
United Arab Emirates	Offshore	Band 1

Walkers is also ranked top tier for the following:

Chambers Europe: Dispute Resolution (Guernsey), Corporate and Finance (Jersey).

Chambers Fintech: Bermuda, British Virgin Islands, Cayman Islands, Guernsey, Jersey.

Chambers HNW Offshore: Trusts | High Net Worth : British Virgin Islands, Cayman Islands.

Legal 500 Asia Pacific Offshore law firms: Hong Kong, Singapore, United Arab Emirates.

Legal 500 EMEA: Offshore Britain: Guernsey (Banking and Finance, Corporate and M&A, Dispute Resolution, Employment).

Legal 500 Americas: Bermuda (Banking, finance and capital markets, Dispute resolution, Insurance/Reinsurance, Regulatory and Compliance), British Virgin Islands (Dispute resolution, Regulatory and compliance, Trust/private client), Cayman Islands (Banking, finance and capital markets, Dispute resolution, Insurance/reinsurance, Regulatory and compliance, Corporate and commercial, Investment funds, Trusts/private client).

Walkers are also highly ranked in IFLR 1000 and ITR World Tax.
