= Cayman Islands Stock Exchange =

Stock exchange based in the Cayman Islands

- Type: Stock Exchange
- Location: George Town, Cayman Islands, Cayman Islands
- Coordinates: 19.3034°N 81.3863°W
- Founded: 1996
- Owner: Stock Exchange Authority
- Key people: Anthony B. Travers (Chairman)
- Currency: KYD
- Website: www.csx.ky

The Cayman Islands Stock Exchange (CSX) is a stock exchange based in Grand Cayman, Cayman Islands. It started operations in July 1997 and is fully owned by the Cayman Islands government. The CSX was recognised by the London Stock Exchange as an approved organisation in July 1999.

Over 1,000 stocks, eurobonds, warrants and global depositary receipts are listed on the CSX. The Chairman of CSX is Anthony Travers, a former Senior Partner at the law firm Maples and Calder. The stock exchange is located at Elizabethan Square in downtown George Town. The exchange uses a fully electronic trading platform that was developed under a partnership with Bloomberg L.P.

The CSX was originally set up to provide a listing facility for the specialist products of the Cayman Islands – mutual funds and specialist debt securities. The CSX's capabilities now extend to sophisticated vehicles and structures including the listing of derivative warrants, depositary receipts, Eurobonds, preferred shares and international equity. The CSX currently has more than 1,400 listings and a market capitalisation of more than $123 billion. Other key facts and recognitions for the CSX include:

- In 2006, surpassing more than 1,000 listings before the 10-year mark, posting on average, double-digit listings growth each year since its inception
- In 2005, reaching break-even status a full two years before planned, allowing the CSX to become a positive contributor to Government's finances
- In 2004, being granted 'recognised stock exchange' status by Inland Revenue in March 2004, greatly enhancing the CSX's commercial appeal to UK investors
- In 2003, being admitted as an affiliate member of the International Organization of Securities Commissions (IOSCO)
- In 2001, being the first (and still only) offshore exchange to become a member of the Intermarket Surveillance Group, a self-governing association of exchanges and exchange regulators from around the world committed to information sharing and the enhancement of market surveillance procedures
- In 1999, becoming the first offshore stock exchange to be registered with the London Stock Exchange

== See also ==
- List of stock exchanges
- List of stock exchanges in the Americas
- List of stock exchanges in the United Kingdom, the British Crown Dependencies and United Kingdom Overseas Territories
