= Human rights in the British Virgin Islands =

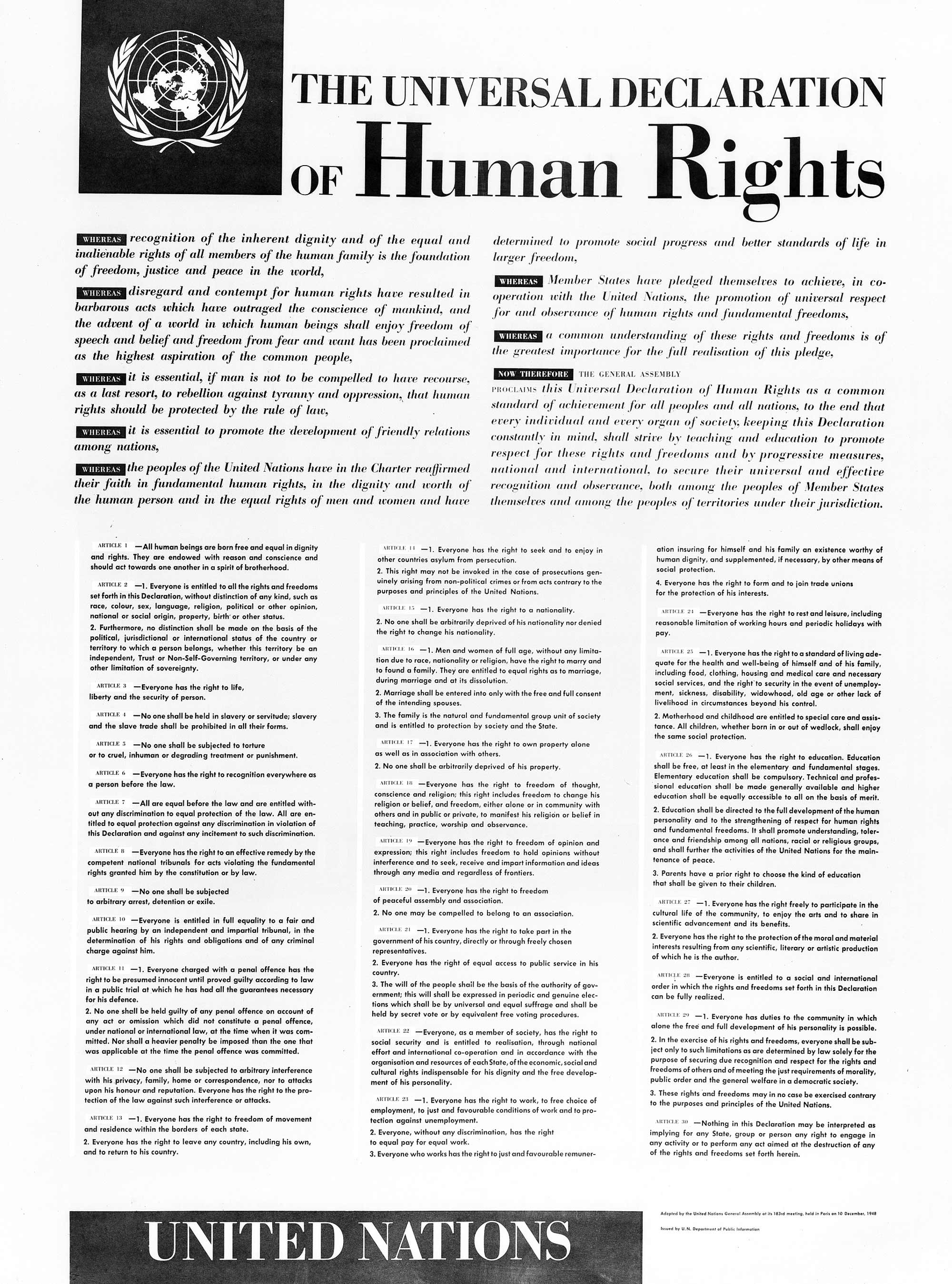
Human rights laws in the BVI are based upon the Universal Declaration of Human Rights (pictured).

In practice, basic human rights in the British Virgin Islands (BVI) appear to be respected.

Reports of repression of freedom of speech, interference with democracy or the rule of law, and arbitrary arrest and torture are generally non-existent. The BVI have been described as "generally free of human rights abuses".

However, the laws in the British Virgin Islands do openly discriminate against people who do not hold what is called “belonger status.” This form of discrimination is expressly preserved in the BVI constitution, which excludes non-belongers from the full scope of its non-discrimination protections. Belongers and non-belongers share unequal rights to employment and to the right to purchase property, and in certain cases non-belongers are made subject to higher rates of taxation. Also, expats in certain professions, their families and children, are subject to exploitation and abuse which their status makes it more difficult for them to challenge.

== Constitutional human rights protections ==
Human rights in the British Virgin Islands are codified in the 2007 constitution.

Section 9 of the constitution is entitled Fundamental rights and freedoms of the individual, and provides:

Whereas every person in the Virgin Islands is entitled to the fundamental rights and freedoms of the individual;

Whereas those fundamental rights and freedoms are enjoyed without distinction of any kind, such as sex, race, colour, language, religion, political or other opinion, national, ethnic or social origin, association with a national minority, property, family relations, economic status, disability, age, birth, sexual orientation, marital or other status, subject only to prescribed limitations;

Whereas it is recognised that those fundamental rights and freedoms apply, subject to respect for the rights and freedoms of others and for the public interest, to each and all of the following, namely—

(a) life, equality, liberty, security of the person and the protection of the law;

(b) freedom of conscience, expression, movement, assembly and association; and

(c) protection for private and family life, the privacy of the home and other property and from deprivation of property save in the public interest and on payment of fair compensation;

Now, therefore, it is declared that the subsequent provisions of this Chapter shall have effect for the purpose of affording protection to the aforesaid rights and freedoms, and to related rights and freedoms, subject to such limitations of that protection as are contained in those provisions, being limitations designed to ensure that the enjoyment of the protected rights and freedoms by any individual does not prejudice the rights and freedoms of others or the public interest.

The subsequent sections of the constitution enumerate and elaborate on certain specific basic human rights, including the right to life, equality before the law, protection from inhuman treatment, protection from slavery and forced labour, the right of prisoners to humane treatment, freedom of movement, freedom of conscience, the right to education, freedom of expression, and freedom of assembly and association.

== Human Rights Commission ==
The constitution also provides for the formation of a Human Rights Commission to oversee and ensure the protection of human rights, although to date no such commission has been formed.

In 2017 legislation was introduced in the House of Assembly of the British Virgin Islands to provide for a Commission, but the legislative process became delayed when Hurricane Irma struck the Territory and the Bill has not yet been passed into law.

== Human rights in the criminal code ==
The British Virgin Islands Criminal Code creates certain specific criminal offences relating to human rights, such as genocide, but does not contain any general statement of human rights.

== Orders-in-council ==
Although the BVI have their own constitution and laws, the United Kingdom government retains sovereign power over the islands, and from time to time has exercised that power by issuing so-called "orders-in-council" that have imposed certain laws upon the BVI, including human rights protections, the spirit of which is contrary to the desires of the majority of BVI residents. For example, the UK abolished the BVI's death penalty for murder in 1991, and decriminalised homosexuality on the islands in 2000.

== Human rights conventions and covenants ==
The following UN human rights conventions and covenants apply to the BVI: United Nations Convention on the Elimination of all Forms of Racial Discrimination, 1965 (CERD) International Covenant on Economic, Social and Cultural Rights, 1966 (ICESCR) International Covenant on Civil and Political Rights, 1966 (ICCPR) United Nations Convention on the Elimination of All Forms of Discrimination Against Women, 1979 (CEDAW) United Nations Convention on the Rights of the Child, 1989 (CRC)

The European Convention of Human rights applies in the BVI, but there is no right of petition to the court (pictured).

The British Virgin Islands courts have also held that the European Convention on Human Rights applies in the Territory through the jurisdiction's constitutional relationship with the United Kingdom. However the applicability is limited in that it does not include any right of petition or any of the extant protocols.

== HRRCC ==
The BVI government established the Human Rights Reporting Coordinating Committee (HRRCC) in 1999 to monitor and report on human rights conditions on the islands. Since 2001, the HRRCC has also published pamphlets, held public meetings, and pursued other means of informing the people of BVI about their rights.

== Belonger status and human rights ==
A citizen of the BVI is known as a BOTC, or British Overseas Territories citizen. Since the passing of the British Overseas Territories Act, 2002 citizens of the BVI are also British citizens with a right to hold British passports and to work in the United Kingdom.

In addition to citizenship, however, there is a separate concept in the BVI that goes by the name of “belonger.” The definition of "belonger" status is complex, and is set out in article 2(2) of the Constitution, which provides:

For the purposes of this Constitution, a person belongs to the Virgin Islands if that person—

(a) is born in the Virgin Islands and at the time of the birth his or her father or mother is or was—

(i) a British overseas territories citizen (or a British Dependent Territories citizen) by virtue of birth, registration or naturalisation in the Virgin Islands or by virtue of descent from a father or mother who was born in the Virgin Islands; or
(ii) settled in the Virgin Islands; and for this purpose "settled" means ordinarily resident in the Virgin Islands without being subject under the law in force in the Virgin Islands to any restriction on the period for which he or she may remain, but does not include persons on contract with the Government of the Virgin Islands or any statutory body or Crown corporation;

(b) is born in the Virgin Islands of a father or mother who belongs to the Virgin Islands by birth or descent or who, if deceased, would, if alive, so belong to the Virgin Islands;
(c) is a child adopted in the Virgin Islands by a person who belongs to the Virgin Islands by birth or descent;
(d) is born outside the Virgin Islands of a father or mother who is a British overseas territories citizen by virtue of birth in the Virgin Islands or descent from a father or mother who was born in the Virgin Islands or who belongs to the Virgin Islands by virtue of birth in the Virgin Islands or descent from a father or mother who was born in the Virgin Islands;
(e) is a British overseas territories citizen by virtue of registration in the Virgin Islands;
(f) is a person to whom a certificate has been granted under section 16 of the Immigration and Passport Act 1977 of the Virgin Islands (in this subsection referred to as "the Act", and references to the Act or to any section thereof include references to any enactment amending, replacing or re-enacting the same) and has not been revoked under section 17 of the Act; and (without prejudice to the right of any person to apply for the grant of such a certificate under the Act) a British overseas territories citizen by virtue of naturalisation in the Virgin Islands has a right by virtue of this Constitution to apply for the grant of such a certificate;
(g) is the spouse of a person who belongs to the Virgin Islands and has been granted a certificate under section 16 of the Act; or
(h) was immediately before the commencement of this Constitution deemed to belong to the Virgin Islands by virtue of the Virgin Islands (Constitution) Order 1976(a).

A "non-belonger" simply means any person who is not a belonger.

It is also possible for non-belongers and non-BOTCs to obtain a lesser status known as "residency". This exempts the holder of residency status from the requirement to obtain a work permit in relation to employment and from the requirement to obtain a land-holding licence if they wish to purchase property. However having residency status does not entitle a person to vote or to hold a British Virgin Islands passport.

=== Belonger status and the right to work ===
While belongers have an automatic right to work on the islands, non-belongers, as a rule, require work permits. Under the Labour Code 2010, a prospective employer faced with choosing between a belonger who is minimally qualified for the job and a non-belonger who has far higher qualifications must choose the belonger. Non-belongers are not permitted to remain in the BVI unless they are working and have a work permit. Such permits must be renewed every year. A non-belonger who changes jobs must apply for a new work permit, which the Commissioner of Labour may or may not choose to grant.

Non-belongers in relatively unskilled jobs undergo various kinds of abuse and exploitation, including being forced to pay for the renewal of their work permits and being denied new work permits for prospective new jobs.

The lack of unions for non-belonger workers in many areas restricts their ability to complain effectively about mistreatment.

=== Belonger status and the right to buy property ===
While belongers have an automatic right to buy property on the islands, non-belongers may purchase property only after the seller has undergone an extensive process of demonstrating that he or she has made a serious but unsuccessful effort to find a belonger interested in buying the property. Also, any belonger wanting to buy property is subject to an investigation by authorities before the sale may go through. In addition, permission for the non-belonger to buy a piece of property may be subject to certain conditions, such as a ban on renting out the property.

=== The acquisition of belonger status ===
Since 2001, it has become more difficult under BVI law to acquire belonger status.

A person born in the BVI with one or two belonger parents is automatically considered a belonger and is also a BOTC.

Persons born in the BVI before 1983 are considered belongers and BOTC. Persons born in the BVI in 2001 or later to parents who are not under Immigration Department control are belongers and BOTC.

Persons born in the BVI before 2001 to parents who are Commonwealth citizens are considered belongers.

A person born in the BVI to a BOTC mother or (legitimately) to a BOTC father is considered a BOTC but not necessarily a belonger. A person who enjoys BOTC status by virtue of parentage but who was not born in the BVI is not necessarily a belonger.

A person born or resident in the BVI who does not fall into any of the above categories is not considered a belonger or a BOTC and is regarded as a temporary immigrant, although belongership and BOTC can be acquired through marriage or application, as described below.

Non-belonger women married to men who are belongers by birth, immediate descent, or naturalisation, or who received a belonger certificate between 1967 and 2001, also become belongers, unless they were divorced before 2001.

A non-belonger who married a belonger in 2001 or later may apply for belonger status after five years of marriage and BVI residence in the BVI. Persons who have spent a year or more in prison for committing a criminal offense are denied this status in such cases, however.

Non-belonger individuals who wish to acquire permanent resident status (that is, to hold a Certificate of Residence), must apply to the Immigration Department. The ensuing bureaucratic process may take years.

An individual over age 18 who was born in or is a resident of the BVI may apply to the governor for belonger status after living in the BVI for at least 10 years and holding a certificate of residence for at least one year. The governor has no obligation to confer belonger status in such situations.

A person who has not been under Immigration Department control for at least one year and who has lived in the BVI for at least five years (three if married to a BOTC) may apply to the governor for BOTC status, which would also carry with it belonger status.

The minor children of parents who have been granted a certificate of residence or belonger status may also be granted the same status as their parents.

== LGBT rights ==
The rights of gay men, lesbians, bisexuals, and transgender people in the British Virgin Islands are relatively restricted as compared with their rights in most Western countries, including the United Kingdom. Until 2001, the BVI criminal code considered buggery a crime. Same-sex activity was decriminalised in that year by an Order in Council by the British government, which acted only under pressure from the EU and UN and against the wishes of the majority of BVI residents.

== Human rights efforts ==
The office of the governor of the BVI organised a week-long program on "Building Human Rights Capacity" in July 2011, intended to improve the understanding and observance of human rights on the part of government officials, law-enforcement officers, immigration officials, and private citizens.

The group Related by Humanity seeks "to promote Human Rights awareness in the Territory of the Virgin Islands". On 10 December 2011, it organized the islands' first official celebration of International Human Rights Day in hope that greater awareness could be brought to this very real and harrowing issue.

== Human rights incidents ==
Recent reports of human rights incidents in the BVI.

- In 2017 various high risk prisoners were transferred to Bordelais Correctional Facility in St. Lucia after the prison in the BVI was damaged in Hurricane Irma. The prisoners complained about being so far removed from their families and violations of their human rights. Those complaints were rejected by Government officials in the BVI and in St Lucia.
- In April 2017 UNICEF published a controversial report on the state of the British Virgin Islands, which included criticism of discrimination against expats in the Territory.

== See also ==
- Law of the British Virgin Islands
