= Cricket in the Cayman Islands =

Cricket in the Cayman Islands is an established sport. The Cayman Islands playing season runs from January to July. There are 20 cricket clubs in the Cayman Islands.

== History ==
Being a British overseas territory for many centuries, it can be assumed that cricket was played in the early 1800s, as it was in the West Indies. It first became organised in the Cayman Islands from 1940 and was contested between the districts of West Bay and George Town. By 1970, the game became structured and more organised, starting with 5 teams and the construction of the Smith Road Oval. The rapid growth of the economy of the Cayman Islands saw many expatriates move to the islands, with them came many people from cricketing nations who helped to fuel a growth in the sport on the islands.

In 1997, the Cayman Islands were admitted to the International Cricket Council as an Affiliate member. In 2000 they made their debut in international cricket in the Americas Cricket Cup, where they finished 4th and gained their first international victory over Argentina. In the same year the Cayman Islands became the first Affiliate to play List A cricket when they took part in the 2000/01 Red Strip Bowl competition. In 2002, they gained Associate membership of the International Cricket Council. By 2005, they were taking part in the ICC Intercontinental Cup, where the Cayman Islands made their debut in first-class cricket against Bermuda and later against Canada. The team lost both matches heavily and has not appeared in first-class cricket since.

Since then the Cayman Islands have dropped rapidly down the cricketing pyramid of the World Cricket League and will now take part in the 2012 ICC World Cricket League Division Five.

== Governing body ==
Cayman Islands Cricket Association is the official governing body of cricket in the Cayman Islands. Its current headquarters is in Grand Cayman. Cayman Islands Cricket Association is the Cayman Islands representative at the International Cricket Council.

== Domestic competitions ==
Men's domestic cricket in the Cayman Islands is split into 2 divisions: Clico Cayman Division 1 and Clico Cayman Division 2. Matches are played in one-day and Twenty20 formats. The islands also have 3 women's cricket clubs.

=== Domestic teams ===
Listed below are the current 7 most senior men's cricket clubs that make up the Clico Cayman Division 1, the highest level of domestic cricket in the Cayman Islands:

- By Rite Cricket Club
- Esso Tigers Cricket Club
- Greenies 1 Cricket Club
- Lime Schools Cricket Club
- Paramount Cricket Club
- Police Cricket Club
- Prison Cricket Club

== Grounds ==
There are currently plans to develop four further cricket grounds in the Cayman Islands. By the end of 2009 a new pavilion had been constructed at the Jimmy Powell Oval.

== National team ==
The Cayman Islands national cricket team formed in 2000. They have played at first-class (in the 2005 ICC Intercontinental Cup) List A (in the 2000–01 Red Stripe Bowl), and Twenty20 level (in the Stanford 20/20), as well as in the World Cricket League. A national women's team also exists, but has played only one international tournament (in 2012).

== See also ==
- Sport in the Cayman Islands
