= Attorney General Archibald =

Attorney General Archibald may refer to:

- Frank C. Archibald (Vermont politician) (1857–1935), Attorney General of Vermont
- Joseph Archibald (1934–2014), Attorney General of the British Virgin Islands
- Samuel George William Archibald (1776–1846), Acting Attorney General for Nova Scotia

== See also ==
- Thomas Archbold (died 1488), Attorney General for Ireland
