= Anthony Travers =

Anthony Travers, OBE was the chairman of the Board of Cayman Finance from 2009 to 2011. Travers is also the Chairman of the Cayman Islands Stock Exchange and former Senior Partner and Managing Partner of international law firm Maples and Calder. He has over thirty years experience in all aspects of Cayman Islands law, particularly mutual funds, structured finance, insurance and private client, and has throughout advised Government on the development of Cayman Islands legislation.

== Biography ==
Travers was an Exhibitioner at St Catharine's College, Cambridge and graduated with a first class degree in law as a Scholar in 1972. In 1975 he was admitted as a solicitor in England and Wales at Clifford Turner and in 1975 he was admitted as an Attorney at law in the Cayman Islands.

Travers joined the firm of Maples and Calder in 1975 and became a partner in 1977. He was the architect of the legislation governing key financial services in the Cayman Islands including the Exempted Limited Partnership Law 1991 and the Mutual Funds Law 1993, which formed the basis for the mutual funds industry and the private equity industry in the Cayman Islands, the Fraudulent Dispositions Law 1989, dealing with asset protection and the Stock Exchange Law 1996. He served as joint and then sole Senior Partner of Maples and Calder from 1980 and as managing partner of the first two foreign offices in Hong Kong in 1995 and London from 1997 to 2003.

He returned to Cayman in 2003 as the senior and managing partner and retired from the firm in 2006 having established further offices for the firm in Dubai, Jersey, the British Virgin Islands, and Dublin. He has been the Chairman of the Cayman Islands Stock Exchange since its inception in 1997 and has served as a member of the Cayman Islands Financial Services Council. Travers has written and spoken extensively on offshore issues over the years.

Travers was appointed Chairman of the Cayman Islands Financial Services Association, now renamed Cayman Finance, in March 2009. He stepped down from that position in February 2011; Cayman Finance indicated in a statement that Travers intended to focus on his other business ventures and spend more time with his family.

In 2011 the inaugural FCI 500 list of the most influential people in financial centres listed Anthony Travers, # 95.

On 1 December 2012 on termination of a six-year non compete clause Travers stepped back into private practice as Senior Partner of boutique Cayman Islands and BVI law firm Travers Thorp Alberga.

Travers appeared on the BBC News programme Newsnight in November 2017 to discuss the leak of the Paradise Papers. He called these "fake news" and expressed the opinion that journalists responsible should be jailed.

== Awards and other positions ==
Travers is a member of the Law Society of England and Wales, the Cayman Islands Law Society (of which he is a former president), the Caymanian Bar Association, and is on the editorial board of LexisNexis Butterworths Offshore Service.

Travers was made an Officer of the Most Excellent Order of the British Empire for his services to the Government and the financial sector in August 1998.
