= Cayman Islands Cricket Association =

- Sport: Cricket
- Jurisdiction: Cayman Islands
- Founded: 1970
- Affiliation: International Cricket Council
- Affiliation date: 1997 (affiliate member); 2002 (associate member)
- Regional affiliation: ICC Americas
- Headquarters: George Town, Grand Cayman
- Sponsor: NCB Cayman Limited, Mourant

Official website
- caymancricket.com
- (Cayman Islands)

Cayman Islands Cricket Association (CICA) is the official governing body of the sport of cricket in the Cayman Islands, a British overseas territory. The organisation's headquarters are in George Town, Grand Cayman. Established in 1970, the CICA has been a member of the International Cricket Council (ICC) since 1997.

== See also ==
- Cayman Islands national cricket team
- Cayman Islands women's national cricket team
- Cayman Islands national under-19 cricket team
- Cayman Islands women's national under-19 cricket team
