= McWelling Todman =

McWelling Todman CBE, QC
- Born: 25 December 1923; Tortola, British Virgin Islands
- Died: 7 March 1996 (aged 72); Tortola, British Virgin Islands
- Occupation: Barrister
- Spouse: Audrey Creque
- Children: McWelling Todman, Cyntelia Todman-Doswell, Henry Todman

McWelling "Mac" Todman, CBE QC (25 December 1923 – 7 March 1996) was a civil servant and lawyer from the British Virgin Islands who played an important role in the early political history of the Territory.

== Early life ==
Mac Todman was born on Christmas 1923 in Tortola, British Virgin Islands. Like many successful Caribbean nationals, he began life as a teacher.

In 1952, he married Audrey Creque, to whom he remained married for life. Together they had three children, one of whom predeceased him.

Todman was also a regular lay preacher at the Road Town Methodist Church.

== Politics ==
After he left teaching Mac Todman held various administrative posts during the colonial administration in the British Virgin Islands before the introduction of self-rule in 1967. This role took him first to Antigua, and later in 1957 to Barbados as part of the doomed Federation of the West Indies. Todman played in active role in supporting the right of the British Virgin Islands for political self-determination. He famously described the constitutional reforms which led to the 1950 general election as "an instrument minimal in its intent and its effect".

He was also a longstanding member of BVI Public Service Commission, serving from 1970 until 1994, just two years before his death.

For his services to Government he was awarded an OBE in 1970, and promoted to be a CBE in 1988.

== Law ==
In 1967 he travelled to London and trained as a barrister at Gray's Inn, becoming the first Belonger from the British Virgin Islands to be called as a lawyer. In 1980 he was elevated to Queen's Counsel. He was the first, and still one of the very few, native-born lawyers from the British Virgin Islands to be so honoured. He founded his own practice, McW Todman & Co, which continues in existence today. He has been described as a lawyer of "exceptional ability."

In 1981 in the early days of the British Virgin Islands financial services industry, other than the Chief Minister of the British Virgin Islands Lavity Stoutt, Mac Todman was the only native-born member of the delegation sent by the Territory to negotiate with the United States in relation to the proposed cancellation of the double tax treaty between the two countries. He memorably described the process as one of "plea-gotiation" rather than "negotiation".

== Death ==
On 7 March 1996, he died peacefully of natural causes. In his memory, the BVI Bar Association instituted an annual lecture series in his name.
