= Corporation Trust Center =

Building in Delaware, United States

Coordinates: 39.74847°N 75.54764°W

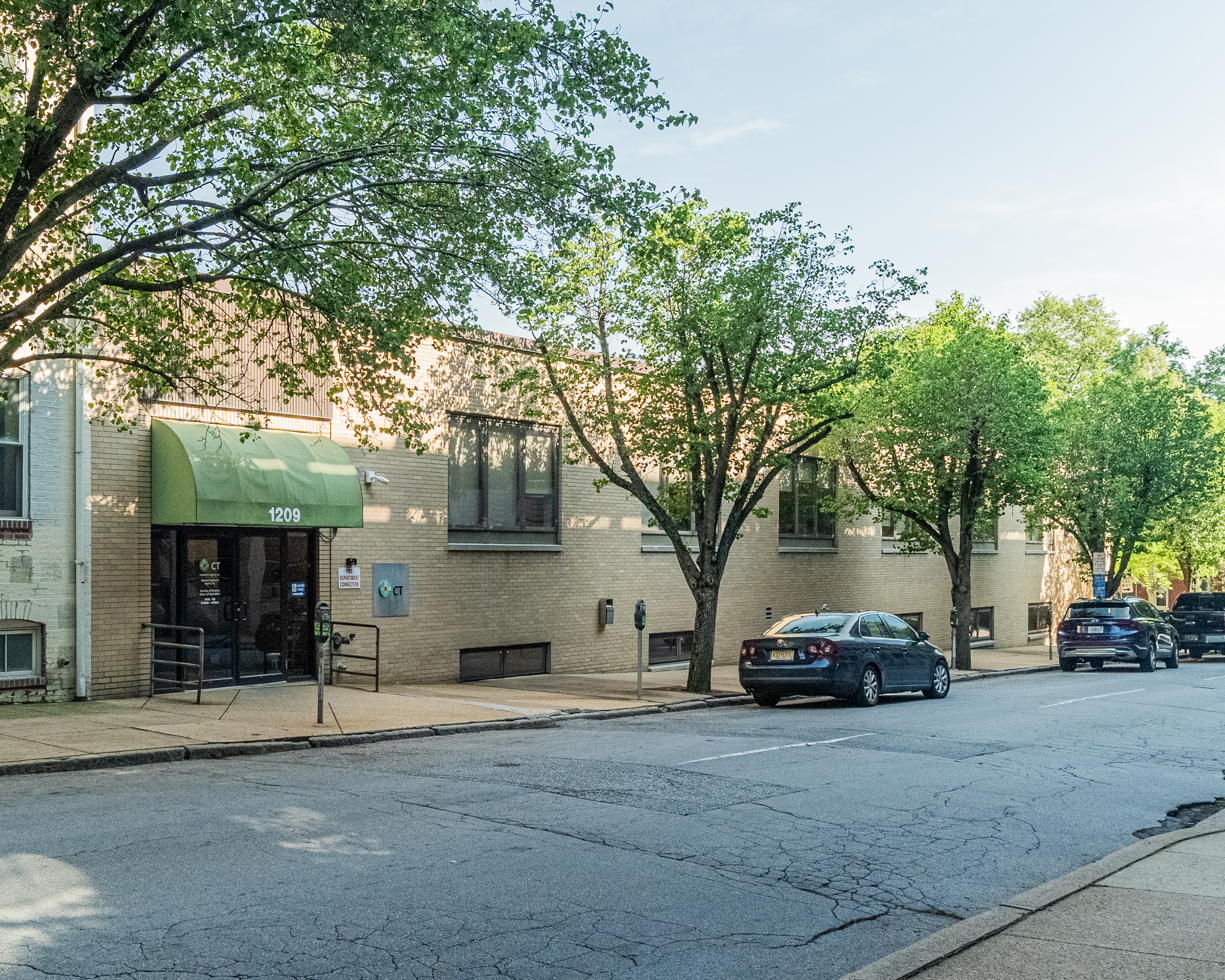
- 1209 North Orange Street, Wilmington, Delaware
- Type: Subsidiary
- Industry: Registered Agent, Corporate Governance, Corporate Compliance, Business License, Entity Management
- Founded: 1892; New Jersey
- Number of employees: 950
- Parent: Wolters Kluwer
- Website: www.wolterskluwer.com/en/solutions/ct-corporation

The Corporation Trust Center is a split-level building at 1209 North Orange Street in Wilmington, Delaware, United States. In 2012, it was the registered agent address of at least 285,000 separate American and foreign businesses that operate or trade in the United States. The building is operated by CT Corporation, a subsidiary of the Dutch information services firm Wolters Kluwer, which provides registered agent services.

Many companies are incorporated in Delaware for its business-friendly General Corporation Law. It was estimated in 2012 that $9.5 billion of potential taxes had not been levied over the past decade due to an arrangement known as the "Delaware loophole". Companies formed in Delaware are required to have an address in the state at which process may be served. Therefore, Delaware entities with no physical office in the state must have a registered agent with a Delaware address. Notable companies represented by CT at the Wilmington location include Google, American Airlines, Apple Inc., General Motors, The Coca-Cola Company, Walmart, Verizon, Take-Two Interactive, United Parks & Resorts (formerly SeaWorld Parks and Entertainment), multiple subsidiaries of Merlin Entertainments, and more than 400 of Deutsche Bank's subsidiaries.

== Background ==
CT Corporation, or the Corporation Trust Company, is a wholly owned subsidiary of Wolters Kluwer, a multinational information services company based in the Netherlands.

Corporation Trust Company, a registered agent business, was founded in New Jersey in 1892.

In 1895, what was then the Corporation Trust Company began assisting lawyers with the details of incorporating and qualifying corporations in all states and territories. They opened their first office in New York City in 1899.

In 1995, CT Corporation and Commerce Clearing House (CCH) were acquired by Wolters Kluwer, a multi-national information services company based in the Netherlands. In 2002 CT acquired Business Filings, Inc., an online incorporation firm based in Madison, Wisconsin. The company is now known as BizFilings.

In 2006, after being acquired by Wolters Kluwer in 2004, Summation Legal Technologies becomes CT Summation joining CT TyMetrix in CT Corporation's Litigation Solutions group. CT Corporation announced its reorganization in 2006 into four business units: Compliance & Governance, UCC Solutions, Litigation Solutions, and Trademark Solutions. CT now includes CT Corporation, CT Lien Solutions, CT Summation, CT TyMetrix and CT Corsearch.

According to The New York Times, CT Corporation was the largest registered agent in Delaware, representing nearly a third of all companies in the state.

In 2018, CT Corsearch was sold to Audax Private Equity and became an independent company.

March 6, 2023, CT Corporation became part of the Financial & Corporate Compliance (FCC) division within Wolters Kluwer.

In February 2025, Wolters Kluwer announced completion of its acquisition of Registered Agent Solutions, Inc. (RASi) in order to expand CT Corporation’s corporate services.

Effective April 1, 2025, Catherine Wolfe was appointed as Executive Vice President and General Manager of CT Corporation.

== See also ==
- Ugland House in George Town, Cayman Islands — the registered office address for 40,000 entities, including many major investment funds, international joint ventures and capital market issuers
- List of company registers
