= Kathleen Ayensu =

British Virgin Islands lawyer

Kathleen Ayensu (born 1953) served as Attorney General of the British Virgin Islands from 24 June 2007 to 24 June 2010. She hails from Ghana. Before becoming the islands' AG, she was the chief state attorney in Accra at the Ministry of Justice, and spent ten years practising law in Washington, D.C.

Political offices
Preceded by Cherno Jallow	Attorney General of the British Virgin Islands; 2007-2011	Succeeded by Christopher Malcolm
