= Virgin Islands General Legal Council =

The Virgin Islands General Legal Council is a body established under the Legal Professions Act, 2015 of the British Virgin Islands. The Act was passed on 25 March 2015 by the House of Assembly of the British Virgin Islands, and came into force on 11 November 2015.

The inaugural Council was appointed in January 2016. There are questions as to the competence of the Council as it relates to its responsibilities, given that it has accomplished next to nothing since its inception.

== Composition and functions ==
Under the Legal Profession Act, the Council will consist of seven persons:

1. a Chairman who shall be a senior legal practitioner who is a Belonger of not less than 10 years' standing, and is nominated by the Chief Justice;
2. a Deputy Chairman who shall be the Attorney General;
3. the President of the BVI Bar Association;
4. two legal practitioners nominated by the BVI Bar Association of not less than 5 years' standing, one of whom must be a Belonger;
5. one person nominated by the Premier, who is not a legal practitioner and who is a Belonger; and
6. one legal practitioner who is a Belonger, nominated by the Leader of the Opposition.

Each member of the Council (other than the Attorney General and the President of the BVI Bar Association) may serve up to two consecutive three year terms.

The Registrar of the High Court would serve as Secretary of the Council. Key functions with respect to the profession in the Territory such as ethics, professional discipline, admission to practice and the validation of training institutions and pupillages shall be delegated to the Council. The Council shall collect enrolment fees and other monies from members of the profession also.

== Current composition ==
The inaugural Council was appointed in January 2016. The present members are:

Virgin Islands General Legal Council
| Name | Appointed by | Notes |
|---|---|---|
| Dancia Penn, QC (Chair) | Chief Justice | Belonger |
| Dawn Smith | ex officio as Attorney General | Non-Belonger |
| Scott Tolliss | ex officio as President of the BVI Bar Association | Non-Belonger |
| Jude Hodge | BVI Bar Association nominees | Belonger |
| Richard May | BVI Bar Association nominees | Non-Belonger |
| Natalie D. Wheatley | Premier | Belonger; not a legal practitioner |
| Jamal Smith | Leader of the Opposition | Belonger |

== Territorial Constitution ==
The Virgin Islands General Legal Council is also referenced in the Constitution of the British Virgin Islands. Under article 94(1) there is provision for a Judicial and Legal Services Commission in which the proposed Council would have a role in the appointment process. The Judicial and Legal Services Commission exercises its constitutional functions in relation to the appointment of various legal and judicial roles in the British Virgin Islands, including the Attorney General of the British Virgin Islands.
