= Same-sex marriage in the United States Virgin Islands =

Same-sex marriage has been legal in the United States Virgin Islands since July 9, 2015, as a result of the U.S. Supreme Court's decision in Obergefell v. Hodges. On June 26, 2015, the Supreme Court ruled that same-sex couples have a constitutional right to marry under the Equal Protection and Due Process clauses of the Fourteenth Amendment, legalizing same-sex marriage in the U.S. Virgin Islands. On June 30, Governor Kenneth Mapp said the territorial government would comply with the ruling, and on July 9 he signed an executive order requiring the government to extend marriage rights to same-sex couples. The first two same-sex couples applied for marriage licenses on July 13, and were issued licenses on July 21 after the 8-day waiting period between applying for and receiving marriage licenses.

== Background ==
The statutes of the U.S. Virgin Islands state that "marriage is hereby declared to be a civil contract which may be entered into between a male and a female in accordance with the law." In May 2014, Senator Judi Buckley introduced draft legislation to the Legislature of the Virgin Islands to legalize same-sex marriage. Called the Civil Marriage Equality Act, it would have replaced the wording "between a male and a female" with "between two persons". It included language that would have allowed anyone authorized to perform a wedding ceremony to decline to do so for any reason. She anticipated that it would take several months for the language to be reviewed. Buckley expected that Governor John de Jongh, who she said would sign the legislation, would leave office in January 2015 before the bill would come to a vote. Supporters of the legislation included Liberty Place, an LGBT advocacy organization based in Saint Croix.

A group of church leaders organized One Voice Virgin Islands to oppose the legislation and plan a petition drive that aimed to collect 50,000 signatures. The group authored a letter to territorial officials that some of its members found objectionable because it included the suggestion that some government officials were homosexual. The group's president, New Vision Ministries Pastor James Petty, said: "We do not wish to be America's same-sex paradise". Pastor Lennox Zamore said that he rejected the argument that legalizing same-sex marriage would benefit the local economy: "We don't want to balance our books by bringing the sex industry – whether it is same sex or not – to the Virgin Islands". The marriage bill was not voted on before the end of the legislative session.

== Obergefell v. Hodges ==
Recognition of same-sex unions in the Lesser Antilles and Puerto Rico Same-sex marriage Unregistered cohabitation Island subject to IACHR advisory opinion No recognition of same-sex couples Constitutional ban on same-sex marriage Same-sex sexual activity illegal but penalties not enforced

The decision of the U.S. Supreme Court in Obergefell v. Hodges on June 26, 2015, that invalidated bans on same-sex marriage under the Fourteenth Amendment, was met with mixed reactions from U.S. Virgin Islands officials. On June 27, Presiding Judge Michael Dunston of the Superior Court said the territory would comply with the ruling, though he thought that marriage licenses could not be issued to same-sex couples until the statutes were amended. On June 30, Governor Kenneth Mapp announced he would issue an executive order directing government agencies and departments to comply with the ruling. He said:

The Government of the Virgin Islands as a civil society can no longer discriminate on marriage. The nation has arrived, pursuant to the Supreme Court's ruling, at full marriage equality — when two consenting adults appear for a marriage license and apply for that license, civil society is required to respond. And so persons of the same-sex can be married in the U.S. Virgin Islands.... The Supreme Court has made a decision that affects the entire nation. It is not for me to express what my personal feelings are. It is for me to do the business of governance and the business of governance, given the Supreme Court’s ruling, says that if an individual in the Virgin Islands is married to a person of the same sex in any state of the nation, that the Virgin Islands government must recognize that marriage as lawful.

Mapp signed the executive order on July 9, although Lieutenant Governor Osbert E. Potter was not on hand to attest to Mapp's signature, as required before the order could go into effect. The President of the U.S. Virgin Islands Legislature, Neville James, a vocal opponent of same-sex marriage, refused to sign off on the executive order in Potter's stead. However, Judge Dunston declared that the Superior Court would act to comply with Obergefell in the absence of action from the Legislature and licenses would be issued for two same-sex couples who had applied on July 13. Potter was expected to return to the territory and sign the executive order on July 15, but was unable to do so after Mapp left the territory the day before, due to Potter serving as acting governor. On July 27, both Governor Mapp and Lieutenant Governor Potter were in the territory together for the first time since before the order was drafted, meaning that Potter would be able to sign the order. On Tuesday, July 28, Potter signed the order, effectively requiring all agencies to comply with the Supreme Court ruling.

The marriage license process is administered by the Superior Court. A couple may apply online and have their license emailed to them or apply in-person at the courthouse, with an application fee of $200. It takes approximately one week for the application to be processed. A licensed judge, minister or officiant may perform the wedding ceremony alongside two witnesses. The first same-sex couple to marry in the U.S. Virgin Islands was Rick Weinstein and Tom Eggleston, who had been together for more than 40 years, in a private ceremony in Charlotte Amalie. In 2024, the U.S. Virgin Islands was named one of the best marriage destinations for same-sex couples in the Caribbean.

== See also ==
- LGBT rights in the United States Virgin Islands
- Same-sex marriage in the United States
- Recognition of same-sex unions in the Americas
