= Attorney General of Saint Kitts and Nevis =

The attorney general of Saint Kitts and Nevis is the primary legal advisor to the Government of Saint Kitts and Nevis. They are an elected or nominated ex-officio member of the National Assembly and member of the cabinet.

For attorneys general before 1958, see Attorney General of the Leeward Islands.

== List of attorneys general of Saint Kitts and Nevis ==
- Saint Kitts-Nevis-Anguilla created, 1958
- Joseph Archibald 1960–1964 (Crown Attorney)
- Cecil Oliver Byron 1962 (Crown Attorney - 8 months)
- Joseph Archibald 1966–1968 (Crown Attorney)
- Anguilla seceded, 1971
- Lee Llewellyn Moore 1971–1979
- Clarence Fitzroy Bryant 1979-1980
- Samuel Weymouth Tapley Seaton 1980–1995 (afterwards Governor-General, 2015)
- Saint Kitts and Nevis became independent, 1983
- Delano Frank Bart 1995–2001
- Dennis H. Merchant 2006–2010
- Patrice D.H. Nisbett 2010-?2013
- Jason Hamilton 2013–2015
- Vincent Fitzgerald Byron 2015-2022
- Garth Wilkin 2022-present
