= List of Cayman Islands women Twenty20 International cricketers =

This is a list of Cayman Islands women Twenty20 International cricketers. A Twenty20 International is an international cricket match between two representative teams, each having Twenty20 International status, as determined by the International Cricket Council (ICC). A Twenty20 International is played under the rules of Twenty20 cricket.

This list includes all players who have played at least one T20I match for Cayman Islands and is initially arranged in the order of debut appearance. Where more than one player won their first cap in the same match, those players are initially listed alphabetically at the time of debut.

== Key ==
General

- ‡ – Captain
- † – Wicket-keeper
- First – Year of debut
- Last – Year of latest game
- Mat – Number of matches played

Batting

- Runs – Runs scored in career
- HS – Highest score
- Avg – Runs scored per dismissal
- * – Batsman remained not out
- 50 – Half-centuries scored
- 100 – Centuries scored

Bowling

- Wkt – Wickets taken in career
- BBI – Best bowling in an innings
- Ave – Average runs per wicket

Fielding

- Ca – Catches taken
- St – Stumpings affected

== List of players ==
Statistics are correct as of 29 September 2024.

Cayman Islands women T20I cricketers
General					Batting					Bowling				Fielding		Ref
No.	Name	First	Last	Mat	Runs	HS	Avg	50	100	Balls	Wkt	BBI	Ave	Ca	St	Ref
1	Petrona Bess	2024	2024	3	1	1*	–	0	0	72	6	3/17	12.16	1	0	
2	Judith Black	2024	2024	4	14	7	7.00	0	0	36	0	–	–	0	0	
3	Kedeen Foster	2024	2024	3	1	1*	1.00	0	0	6	0	–	–	0	0	
4	Cassandra Gardener	2024	2024	4	25	19	12.50	0	0	79	2	1/18	52.00	0	0	
5	Sandra Johnson‡	2024	2024	4	6	5	2.00	0	0	68	2	2/25	61.50	1	0	
6	Marcia Moiten	2024	2024	4	27	15	6.75	0	0	84	6	3/16	16.00	3	0	
7	Molly Moore	2024	2024	3	29	25*	14.50	0	0	–	–	–	–	0	0	
8	Rose Muir	2024	2024	4	83	50*	27.66	1	0	24	0	–	–	0	0	
9	Samantha Sillitoe†	2024	2024	4	1	1	0.25	0	0	–	–	–	–	1	0	
7	Shastri Singh	2024	2024	2	0	0	0.00	0	0	–	–	–	–	0	0	
11	Felicia Wright	2024	2024	4	31	15*	15.50	0	0	6	0	–	–	0	0	
12	Alicia Aaron	2024	2024	1	2	2	2.00	0	0	–	–	–	–	0	0	
13	Cavell Drummond†	2024	2024	3	3	3*	–	0	0	–	–	–	–	2	0	
14	Kaydianne Russell	2024	2024	1	–	–	–	–	–	–	–	–	–	0	0	
