= Arbitration in the British Virgin Islands =

Arbitration in the British Virgin Islands is regulated principally by the Arbitration Act, 2013 which came into force on 1 October 2014. Prior to that date, arbitration was regulated by the Arbitration Cap, 1976 (Cap 6).

The Arbitration Act is based heavily on the UNCITRAL Model Law on International Commercial Arbitration, but modified slightly for application under British Virgin Islands law. Where the parties have agreed in writing that disputes between them are to be resolved by arbitration, the courts must stay any court proceedings in favour of arbitration unless the court determines that the agreement is void.

The Arbitration Act provides for the creation of a new statutory body called the BVI International Arbitration Centre. However, the organs of that body have not yet been appointed. Draft subsidiary legislation, the BVI IAC Rules, have been circulated for private sector comment, but not yet brought into force. Accordingly, at present all arbitration in the British Virgin Islands is conducted as ad hoc arbitrations.

== New York Convention ==
The British Virgin Islands acceded to the 1958 New York Convention on 25 May 2014. Prior to that date it was possible to enforce arbitral awards from New York Convention states under the old Arbitration Cap, 1976 which had incorporated the provisions of the Convention into domestic law with effect to the recognition of overseas arbitration awards. However, it was not reciprocal - it was not possible at the time to have a British Virgin Islands arbitration award recognised in another Convention state under the 1958 Convention.

The British Virgin Islands courts may only decline to recognise a foreign arbitral award from a Convention state on the following grounds:

1. that a party to the arbitration agreement was, under the law applicable to that party, under some incapacity;
2. that the arbitration agreement was not valid
  1. under the law to which the parties subjected it; or
  2. if there was no indication of the law to which the arbitration agreement was subjected, under the law of the country where the award was made;
3. that the person
  1. was not given proper notice of the appointment of the arbitrator or of the arbitral proceedings; or
  2. was otherwise unable to present his case;
4. that the award
  1. deals with a difference not contemplated by, or not falling within, the terms of the submission to arbitration; or
  2. contains decisions on matters beyond the scope of the submission to arbitration;
5. that the composition of the arbitral authority or the arbitral procedure was not in accordance with,
  1. the agreement of the parties; or
  2. if there was no agreement, the law of the country where the arbitration took place; or
6. that the award
  1. has not yet become binding on the parties; or
  2. has been set aside or suspended by a competent authority of the country in which, or under the law of which, it was made.
7. the award is in respect of a matter which is not capable of settlement by arbitration under the laws of the British Virgin Islands; or
8. it would be contrary to public policy to enforce the award.

An award which contains decisions on matters not submitted to arbitration may be enforced to the extent that the award contains decisions on matters submitted to arbitration which can be separated from those on matters not so submitted.

== Companies ==
Prior to 1 January 2005, when the BVI Business Companies Act, 2004 came into force, it was standard for companies incorporated in the British Virgin Islands to include an arbitration clause in the articles of association. Under the law at the time, this limited the ability of a minority shareholder to seek relief from the courts on the basis of a just and equitable winding-up. The law has since been modified to provide other forms of minority shareholder relief in cases of unfair prejudice.

== Court assistance ==
Arbitration in the British Virgin Islands is intended to be conducted with minimal interferences with, or assistance from, the courts. However the British Virgin Islands court retain jurisdiction to give interim relief to support the arbitration process where required.

== BVI International Arbitration Centre ==
The British Virgin Islands International Arbitration Centre (usually referred to as the "BVI IAC") provided for under the legislation is to officially open on 17 November 2016. The BVI International Arbitration Centre opened with a panel of 170 arbitrators available to determine party disputes. The independent not-for-profit institution was established to meet the demands of the international business community for a neutral, impartial, efficient and reliable dispute resolution institution in the Caribbean, Latin America and beyond.

The inaugural board of the BVI International Arbitration Centre included Mr. John Beechey (Chairman), Mr. Mark Forte, Mr. Cherno Jallow, QC, Mr. Murray Smith and Ms. Felice Swapp. Mr. Toby Landau, QC serves as advisor to the board.
