= Offshore magic circle =

Multi-jurisdictional tax haven law firms

The offshore magic circle is the set of the largest multi-jurisdictional law firms who specialise in offshore financial centres, especially the laws of the British Overseas Territories of Bermuda, Cayman Islands, and British Virgin Islands, and the Crown dependencies of Jersey, Guernsey and the Isle of Man.

The same firms are also increasingly advising on the laws of onshore financial centres, especially Ireland and Luxembourg.

== Definition ==
The term is a derivation of the widely recognised London 'magic circle' of top law firms, and is widely used in the offshore legal industry. The term has also become used to describe the offshore legal industry in a more pejorative sense (e.g. when the general media reports on Paradise Papers–type offshore financial scandals), and is therefore more sparingly used, or found, in major legal publications (e.g. Legal Business).

There is no consensus definition over which firms belong in the offshore magic circle. A 2008 article in the publication Legal Business (Issue 181, Offshore Review, February 2008) suggested a list, which has been repeated by others, and is simply the top 10 offshore law firms, but excluding Gibraltar–specialist Hassans. (Note: The odd one out is offshore law firm Hassans, a Gibraltar-based law firm which ranks 9th in terms of total lawyer numbers, one place ahead of 10th ranked Bedell, however, Hassan's is not a "multi-jurisdictional" offshore law firm.)

- Appleby
- Bedell
- Carey Olsen
- Conyers
- Harneys
- Maples
- Mourant
- Ogier
- Walkers
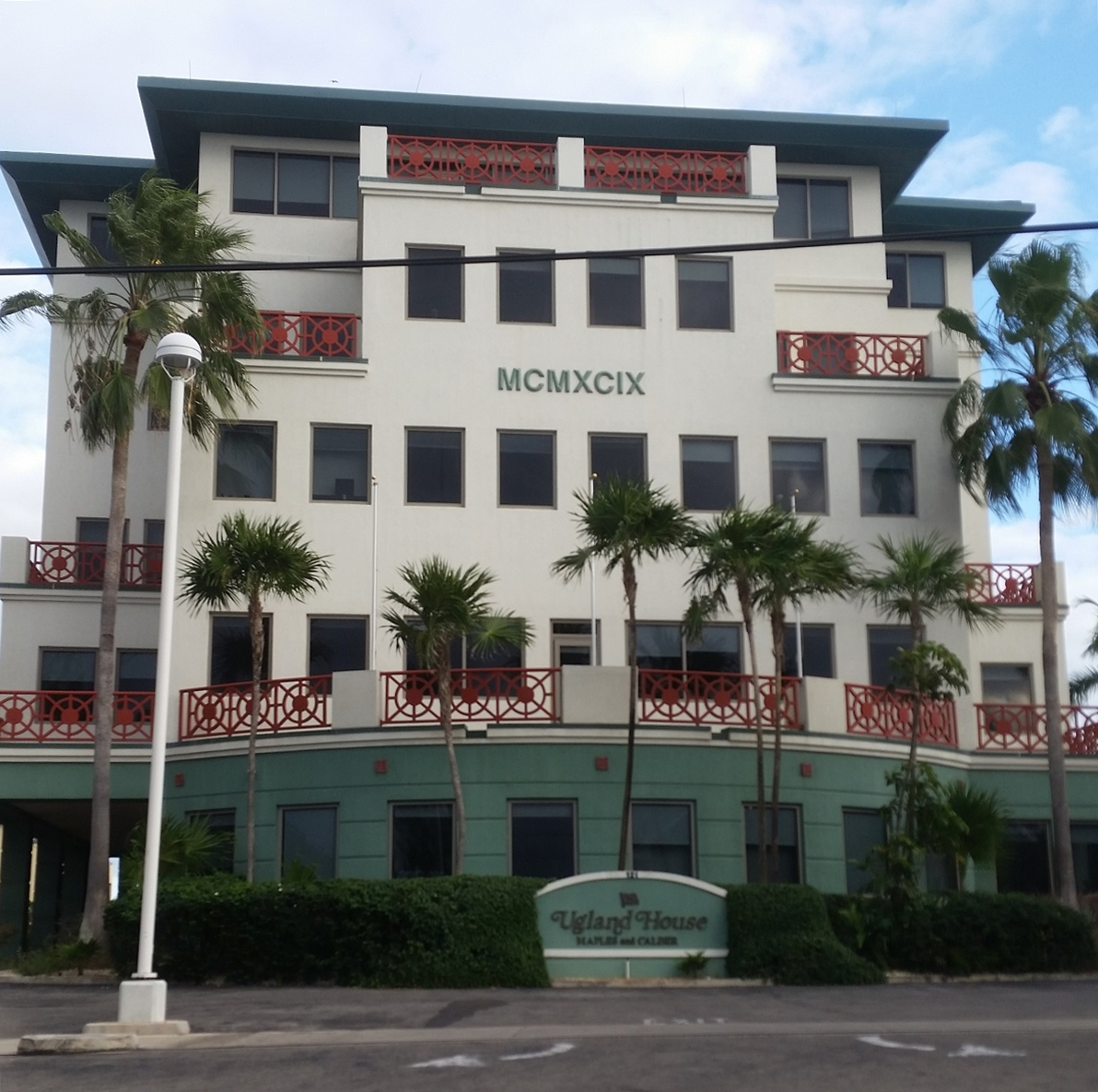
Maples and Calder is the largest offshore law firm by number of lawyers.

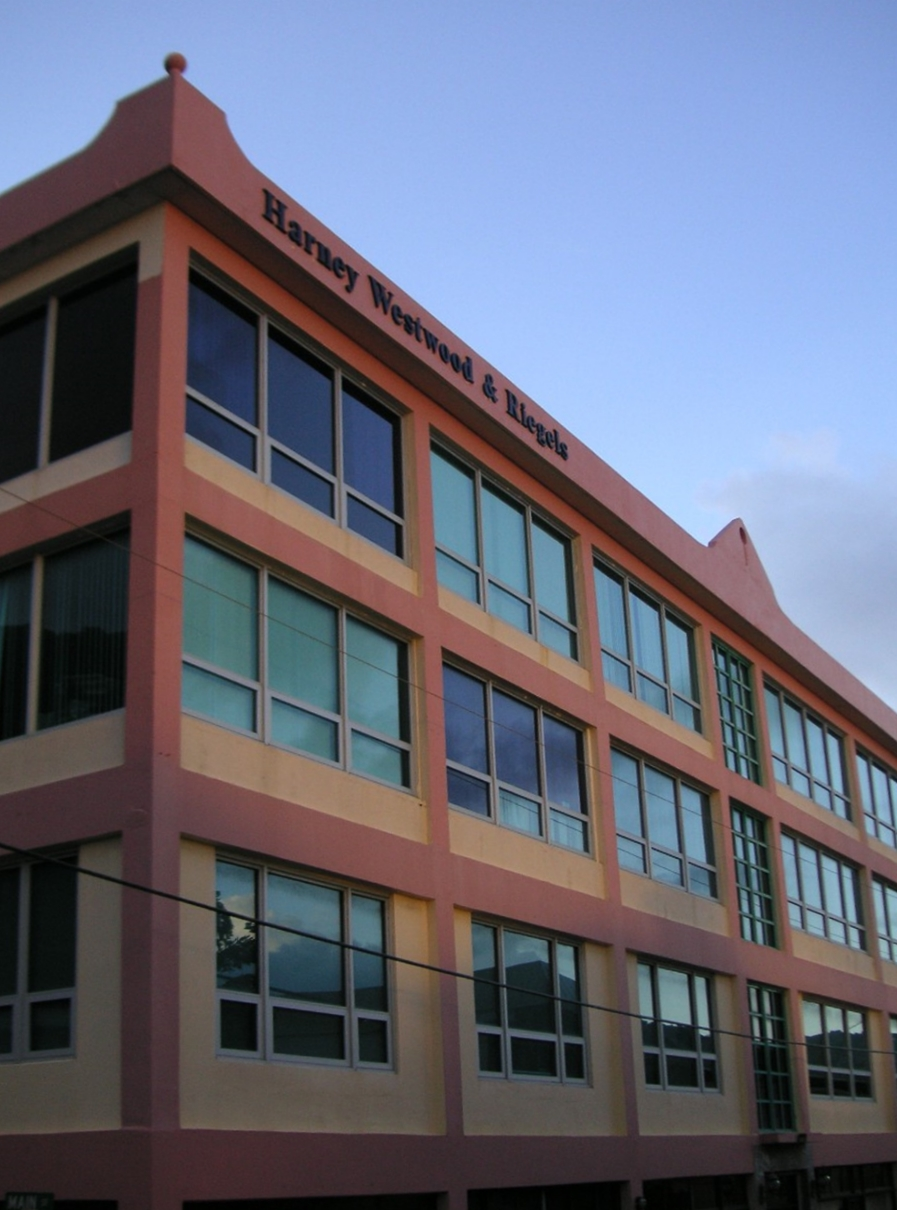
Head offices of Harney Westwood & Riegels.

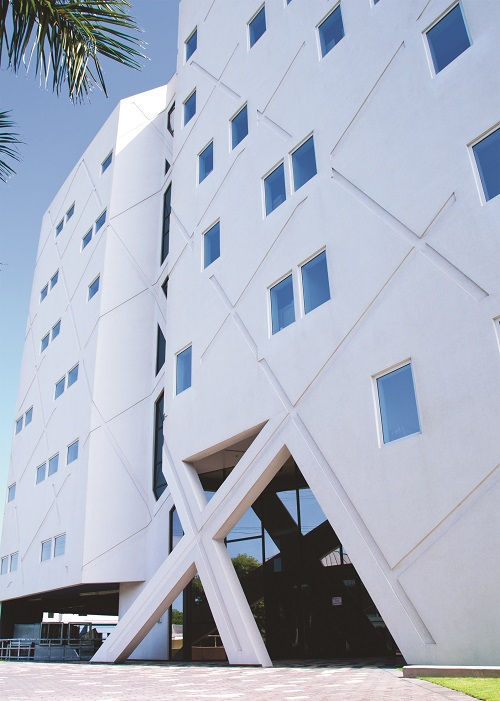
Walkers' head office in the Cayman Islands

== Criticism ==
In the wider legal community, it has been suggested that the 'magic circle' label for offshore firms is self-promoting. Not only does the group suggested by Legal Business seem large (with nine firms, as opposed to the five firms in the original London magic circle), but it also appears to contain a fairly high percentage of all the specialist offshore law firms, including almost all the significant Channel Islands firms.

The major offshore firms do not use the 'magic circle' terminology. Edward Fennell, a legal columnist for The Times, has expressed dim views of law firms designating themselves as part of an offshore magic circle. However, the concept of an offshore magic circle is actively promoted by legal recruitment consultants who hope to persuade London lawyers to spend a few years working in an offshore jurisdiction.

== Endorsement ==
The Chambers legal directory in its 2008 edition, recognised the move towards multi-jurisdictional specialist offshore firms, and included a new ranking for global offshore specialist firms, rather than by jurisdiction. Arguably this was the first defined "offshore magic circle", although the directory did not use the term.

That Chambers list included the same names as the list produced by "Legal Business" in its 2008 Offshore Review article. In addition, Chambers stated that single-jurisdiction offshore specialist firms (e.g. Hassans), no matter how good, would not be considered in this new Global – Offshore category.

The Lawyer magazine produces a list of the top twenty offshore law firms by number of partners, published each February.

== Multi-jurisdiction firms ==
The following table sets out the offshore jurisdictions in which the principal multi-jurisdictional offshore firms practise law (correct as of March 2020). The table does not list 'sales' offices, where the firms do not practise the local law (typically, they will have an office in London, Zurich, and/or other large onshore centres, but will not practise English or Swiss law). However, Ireland and Luxembourg are included in this table, as several firms have moved into practising law in those two "midshore" jurisdictions, especially with regards funds, where they compete with large onshore firms like Matheson.

Firm	Lawyers (2018)	Bermuda	BVI	Cayman	Ireland	Guernsey	Jersey	Mauritius	Luxembourg	Other	"Home" jurisdiction
Appleby	184	Yes	Yes	Yes		Yes	Yes	Yes		Hong Kong, Isle of Man, Seychelles	Bermuda
Bedell Cristin	72		Yes	Yes		Yes	Yes				Jersey
Carey Olsen	210	Yes	Yes	Yes		Yes	Yes			Hong Kong	Channel Islands*
Conyers	139	Yes	Yes	Yes						Hong Kong	Bermuda
Harneys	162	Yes	Yes	Yes				Yes	Yes	Anguilla, Cyprus, Hong Kong	British Virgin Islands
Maples	303		Yes	Yes	Yes		Yes		Yes	Hong Kong, Dubai	Cayman Islands
Mourant	238		Yes	Yes		Yes	Yes	Yes	Yes	Hong Kong	Channel Islands*
Ogier	200		Yes	Yes	Yes	Yes	Yes		Yes	Hong Kong	Jersey
Walkers	269	Yes	Yes	Yes	Yes	Yes	Yes			Dubai, Hong Kong, London	Cayman Islands

* Carey Olsen was formed by the merger of two roughly equivalent sized firms from Jersey and Guernsey. Mourant Ozannes was formed by a merger of firms from Jersey, Guernsey and the Cayman Islands.

== See also ==
- Panama Papers
- Paradise Papers
- Tax haven
- Tax shelter
- Corporate tax haven
- Conduit and Sink OFCs
