= Paula F. Beaubrun =

Saint Lucian barrister and government official

Paula Beaubrun

Paula Frances Beaubrun (1928 – 3 August 1994) was a Grenadian-born, Saint Lucian barrister, who was the first woman to be appointed to the post of Attorney General of the British Virgin Islands.

== Biography ==
Beaubrun was born in 1928 in St George's, Grenada, to Clytie and Ignatius Cecil Beaubrun, in a family of seven children. The family lived in Grenada, Barbados and Trinidad, before settling in Saint Lucia. Her father was the first West Indian to be appointed Colonial Treasurer. Her brother Michael Beaubrun, (Note: He is referred to as Matthew in the News Journal, but appears to be a mistake.) was Professor of Psychiatry at the University of the West Indies and, from 1976 to 1981, was a senator for Trinidad and Tobago.

From 1958 to 1960 she was joint treasurer of the British-Caribbean Association, subsequently joining its executive committee. On 4 November 1960 she entered Lincoln's Inn to study law. After returning to the Caribbean, she became the first woman to be appointed to the post of Attorney General of the British Virgin Islands. In the first instance she held the role of acting attorney general from 1 July 1972 to 30 June 1973, which was followed by her appointment as attorney general from 1 July 1973 to 25 July 1977.

As a member of the formative Steering Committee of the Saint Lucia Sickle Cell Association alongside Ira Simmons, Beaubrun was instrumental in its establishment. She was also President of the Saint Lucia Cancer Society. In 1989 she lived in Saint Lucia and had a reputation as an expert on fruit trees of the Caribbean. She died on 3 August 1994 and is buried alongside her father Ignatius Cecil Beaubrun, OBE, in Castries City Cemetery, Saint Lucia.

== Office ==
| Preceded by Nolan Jacobs | Attorney General of the British Virgin Islands; 2007-2011 | Succeeded by Clare I. Roberts |
