= Cayman Islands women's national cricket team =

Cayman Islands
- Flag of the Cayman Islands
- Association: Cayman Islands Cricket Association

International Cricket Council
- ICC status: Associate member (2002); Affiliate member (1997)
- ICC region: Americas

International cricket
- First international: v. United States at George Town; 23 April 2012

T20 Internationals
- First T20I: v Argentina at Pocos Oval, Poços de Caldas; 26 September 2024
- Last T20I: v Mexico at Pocos Oval, Poços de Caldas; 29 September 2024
T20Is	Played	Won/Lost
Total	4	1/3 (0 ties, 0 no results)
This year	0	0/0 (0 ties, 0 no results)
- As of 29 September 2024

The Cayman Islands women's national cricket team represents the Cayman Islands, a British overseas territory, in international women's cricket. The team is organised by the Cayman Islands Cricket Association, which has been a member of the International Cricket Council (ICC) since 1997.

In April 2018, the ICC granted full Women's Twenty20 International (WT20I) status to all its members. Therefore, all Twenty20 matches played between the Cayman Islands women and another international side after 1 July 2018 will be eligible for full WT20I status.

== History ==
Women's cricket in the Cayman Islands was formally revived in 2009, after several years without organised competition. The national team has only participated in one international tournament, which they hosted – the 2012 ICC Americas Women's Twenty20 Championship. At the event, the team lost its first three matches by heavy margins, losing to the United States by 68 runs, Argentina by eight wickets, and Canada by 106 runs. However, the Caymans won their fourth game easily, defeating Brazil by seven wickets in a match that was reduced to 13 overs per side. The team's final match of the tournament, against Bermuda, was washed out, with the Cayman Islands consequently placing fourth on the points table (out of six teams).

== Records and statistics ==
International Match Summary — Cayman Islands Women

Last updated 29 September 2024

Playing Record
Format	M	W	L	T	NR	Inaugural Match
Twenty20 Internationals	4	1	3	0	0	26 September 2024

=== Twenty20 International ===
T20I record versus other nations

Records complete to WT20I #2053. Last updated 29 September 2024.

Opponent	M	W	L	T	NR	First match	First win
ICC Associate members
Argentina	1	0	1	0	0	26 September 2024	
Brazil	1	0	1	0	0	28 September 2024	
Mexico	2	1	1	0	0	27 September 2024	29 September 2024

== See also ==
- List of Cayman Islands women Twenty20 International cricketers
- Cricket in the Cayman Islands
- Cayman Islands men's national cricket team
