= Hassans =

Gibraltarian Law Firm

Coordinates: 36.1410°N 5.3551°W

Hassans International Law Firm Limited
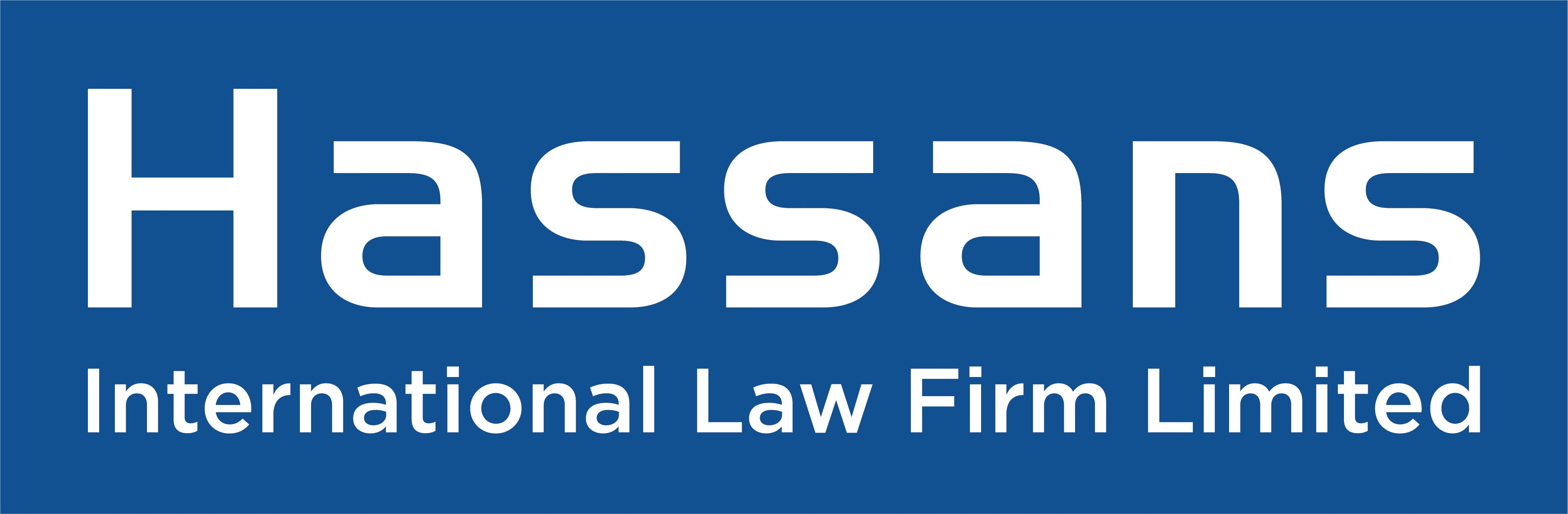
- Headquarters: Madison Building, Midtown; Queensway, Gibraltar
- No. of offices: 2
- No. of attorneys: Approx. 90
- No. of employees: Approx. 250
- Major practice areas: Corporate and commercial, financial services, tax, funds, legislative drafting, private client and trust law, property, shipping and company, trust management
- Key people: James Levy CBE KC (Senior Partner).
- Date founded: 1939
- Founder: Sir Joshua Hassan, GBE, KCMG, LVO, GMH, KC
- Website: GibraltarLaw.com

Hassans International Law Firm Limited is the largest law firm in Gibraltar. It has approximately 90 lawyers and was established in 1939 by Sir Joshua Hassan GBE, KCMG, LVO, GMH, KC. The firm's current senior partner is James Levy CBE KC, nephew of Sir Joshua. Former Hassans' partner Fabian Picardo KC is the current Chief Minister of Gibraltar.

== Practice ==
The firm specialises in Corporate and commercial, financial services, tax, funds, legislative drafting, private client and trust law, property, shipping and company and trust management.

The firm operates out of its head office in Gibraltar and also has an office in Sotogrande, Spain.

== Accreditation ==
Hassans is ranked as Tier 1 by Chambers and Partners legal directory, and is rated as tier 1 in every category by the Legal 500 directory. At present the senior partner is James Levy CBE KC (nephew of the founding partner Sir Joshua Hassan) he was awarded a lifetime achievement award in the Chambers & Partners European Awards 2008.

Independent legal directories have consistently ranked Hassans as a Tier 1 law firm in Gibraltar and say "Gibraltar's largest law firm, receives praise all round for being the country's most highly reputed law firm". In February 2014, The Lawyer magazine ranked Hassans ninth in its annual list of Top 30 offshore law firms, often described as the offshore magic circle.

== Offices ==
- Gibraltar
- Sotogrande, Spain

== List of MPs who worked at Hassans ==
Joshua Hassan (1915-1997): Founder of Hassans, 1st & 3rd Chief Minister of Gibraltar (1964-1969 & 1972-1987); 1st Mayor of Gibraltar (1955-1969).

Peter Montegriffo: Former MP and Minister for Trade and Industry (1988-1991 & 1996-2000); Current Chairman of the Gibraltar Police Authority (GPA).

Fabian Picardo (b. 1972): Incumbent, 7th Chief Minister of Gibraltar (since 2011).

Selwyn Figueras: Former MP and Shadow Minister (2011-2015)

Daniel Feetham: Former MP, Inaugural Minister for Justice; Shadow Minister & Leader of the Opposition (2007-2023). [brother of Nigel Feetham]

Gilbert Licudi: Former MP, Shadow Minister and Minister (2007-2023).

Nigel Feetham: Incumbent Minister for Justice, Trade and Industry (since 2023). [brother of Daniel Feetham]

Gemma Arias-Vasquez: Incumbent Minister for Health, Care and Business (since 2023)

== Line Group ==
Hassans also has its own Company and Trust Management corporations, Line Trust Corporation Limited and Line Management Services Limited.
