= One Voice Virgin Islands =

One Voice Virgin Islands is an organization formed in June 2014 to oppose same-sex marriage in the United States Virgin Islands. It is based in Charlotte Amalie, the capital of the U.S. territory.

The group was organized after the introduction of a bill that would allow same-sex marriage in the U.S. Virgin Islands. It bills itself on its Facebook page as "a coalition made up of very concerned Virgin Islanders of different walks of life and faiths to include Christians, Muslims, Rastafarians, and others." Many of One Voice's leaders are church leaders. They have held rallies and news conferences. The group used pictures of businesses and cruiselines for propaganda; they received cease and desist orders from those businesses.

== See also ==
- LGBT rights in the United States Virgin Islands
- Same-sex marriage in the United States Virgin Islands
- Politics of the United States Virgin Islands
- Religion in the United States Virgin Islands
- Same-sex marriage in the United States
