= Cherno Jallow =

Gambian lawyer and judge

Cherno Jallow KC

Justice of the Supreme Court of the Gambia
- Incumbent
- Assumed office 28 April 2017
- President: Adama Barrow

Attorney General of the British Virgin Islands
- In office 1 November 1999 – 22 February 2007
- Preceded by: Dancia Penn
- Succeeded by: Kathleen Ayensu

Personal details
- Born: Cherno Sulayman Jallow; 15 November 1962 (age 63) Old Yundum, Kombo North, The Gambia
- Citizenship: Gambian citizenship
- Education: International Islamic University Malaysia; University of the West Indies

Cherno Sulayman Jallow KC (born 15 November 1962) is a Gambian lawyer and judge who serves as a Justice of the Supreme Court of the Gambia. He previously served as Attorney General of the British Virgin Islands from 1999 to 2007.

== Early life and education ==
Jallow was born in the village of Old Yundum, Kombo North. His father was from Old Yundum too, with his mother from Brufut. When he had to be registered for school, he moved in with his grandparents in Brufut as they lived closer to a primary school. In Brufut, he regularly attended Quranic school under the teacher of his grandfather. After primary school, he gained admission to Armitage High School in Janjanbureh, studying there from 1975 to 1980, and graduating with O-Levels. He then attended Saint Augustine's High School in Banjul for two years, graduating with A-Levels in 1982.

He worked as a teacher at Sukuta Technical School in the intervening period before he went to study law at the International Islamic University Malaysia from 1984 to 1988, graduating with a second class upper. He went on to further studies, completing a Certificate in Legislative Drafting at the University of the West Indies on Barbados in 1989, and completed a master's degree there in Legislative Drafting and Public Law in 1994.

== Early career ==
Jallow was admitted as a barrister and solicitor in the Supreme Court of the Gambia in 1988. From August 1988 to November 1990, he worked as a state counsel in the Attorney General's Office, with a particular focus on criminal prosecution. From December 1990 to December 1991, Jallow worked as Assistant Legal Draftsman, responsible for drafting legislation as well as undertaking some criminal and civil litigation. He became the Acting Legal Draftsman in January 1992, and was officially confirmed in the role in May. In February 1994, he became the Acting Parliamentary Counsel, and was again confirmed in the role in May that year.

== British Virgin Islands ==
In October 1995, Jallow was appointed as parliamentary counsel in the Attorney General's Chambers on the British Virgin Islands, to serve until October 1999. His responsibilities included providing legal advice to government ministries, attending meetings of the Legislative Council to advise on legislative measures, and holding conferences to discuss issues pertaining to the law, especially relating to policy creation. On 1 November 1999, Jallow was appointed as Acting Attorney General of the British Virgin Islands, and was confirmed in this role on 22 February 2000.

Jallow stepped down in 2007 to take up a position as Director of Policy, Research and Statistics with the British Virgin Islands Financial Services Commission. He was described by Governor David Pearey as "an outstanding member of the Executive Council." Jallow was appointed as a Queen's Counsel (QC) (now King's Counsel since the death of Queen Elizabeth II on 8 September 2022) of the British Virgin Islands Bar in 2007, although he is not admitted to practice as a lawyer in the jurisdiction, as the Attorney General is exempt from admission requirements that apply to other lawyers in the territory. Jallow served as chairman of the Caribbean Financial Action Task Force for its 2012 to 2013 term. In September 2015, he was also appointed to the BVI International Arbitration Centre Board.

== Supreme Court justice ==
Jallow was appointed as a Justice of the Supreme Court of the Gambia on 28 April 2017 by President Adama Barrow.

== Constitutional Review Commission ==
Justice Jallow was designated Chairman of the Constitutional Review Commission by the Chief Justice of the Republic of The Gambia, Hon. Hassan B Jallow, and he took up the appointment in March, 2018. The Commission comprises ten other commissioners and it is tasked to review the current Constitution of The Gambia with a view to drafting a new one.
