= Ugland House =

Headquarters of Maples and Calder

Coordinates: 19.2920°N 81.3854°W

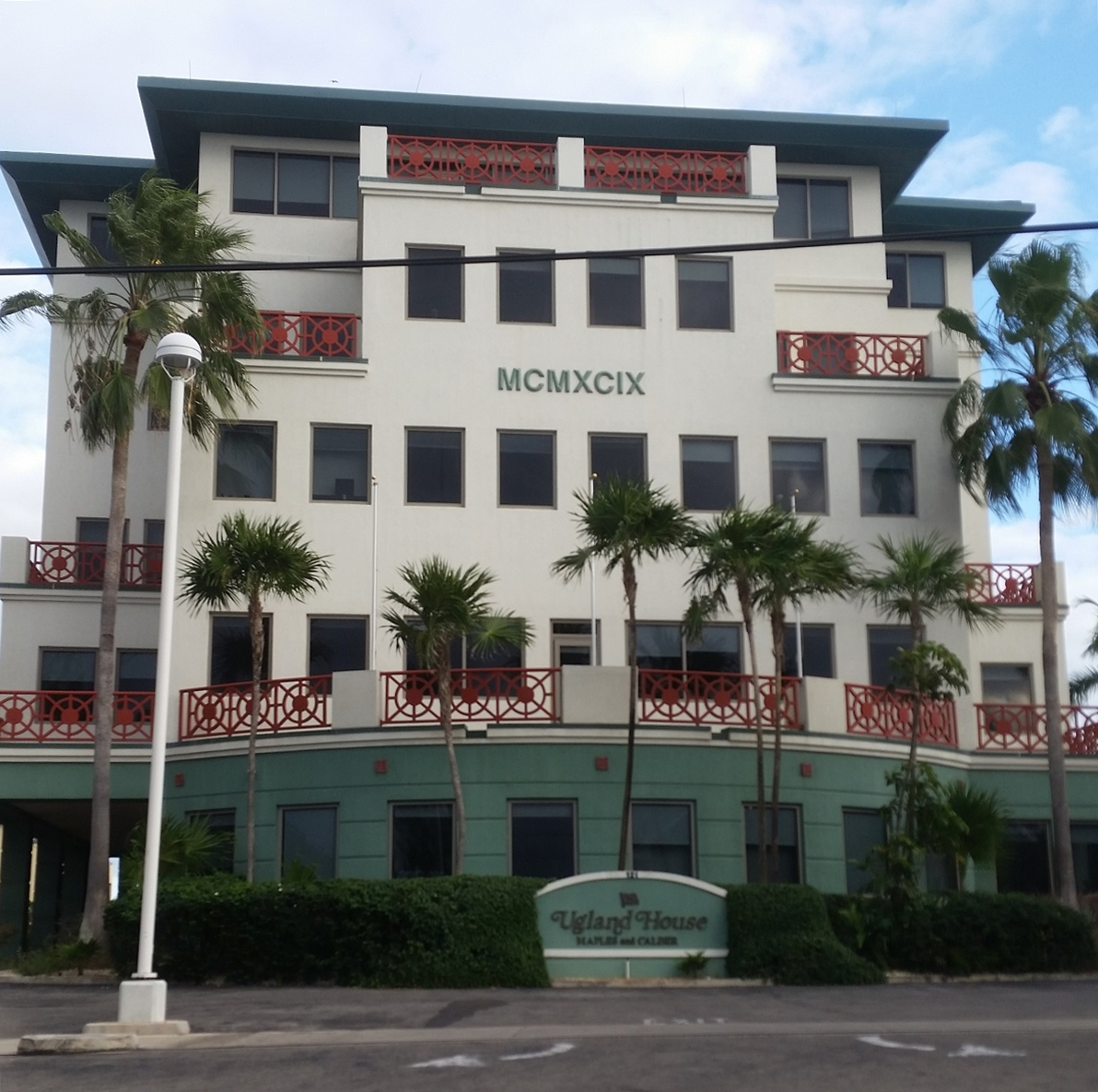
Ugland House

Ugland House is a building located in George Town, Cayman Islands. Located at 121 South Church Street, the building is occupied by the law firm Maples and is the registered office address for 40,000 entities, including many major investment funds, international joint ventures and capital market issuers.

== Investigation by the U.S. government ==
During his first presidential campaign, U.S. President Barack Obama referred to Ugland House as "the biggest tax scam in the world", raising questions over the number of companies with a registered office in the building.

President Obama subsequently nominated Jack Lew to Treasury Secretary in 2013, despite objections that Mr. Lew had invested heavily in funds in Ugland House while he worked as an investment banker at Citigroup during the 2008 financial meltdown, with President Obama stating that he was not concerned about Mr. Lew's past financial transactions.

In 2008, the United States Government Accountability Office (GAO), an independent body of the U.S. Congress, investigated the nature of entities registered in the Cayman Islands and at Ugland House. The investigation involved reviews of documentation as well as interviews with officials from the Internal Revenue Service, Securities and Exchange Commission, the Department of the Treasury, the Department of Justice, the Overseas Private Investment Corporation, and the Export-Import Bank of the United States.

The GAO found that 95% of the entities with a registered office address at Ugland House are not wholly owned by U.S. persons. Also, the GAO validated the reasons why the Cayman Islands has become a popular jurisdiction for international finance and business, including the country's reputation "as having a stable and internationally compliant legal and regulatory system." In an interview with the GAO, representatives from the U.S. Internal Revenue Service (IRS) cited "the Cayman Islands' reputation for regulatory sophistication" and "legal protections for creditors and investors" as factors that might attract legal financial activity.

In addition, the GAO report explained how U.S. government trade promotion agencies use the Cayman Islands and entities registered at Ugland House. The Export-Import Bank told the GAO that it has used the Cayman Islands to support the sale of aircraft manufactured in the United States. Between 2003 and the time of the GAO investigation, the Export-Import Bank had been involved in supporting 42 aircraft financing deals in the Cayman Islands. Also, officials from the Overseas Private Investment Corporation (OPIC), another U.S. government agency, told the GAO that "one-third to half of private-equity funds in which it has invested have been organized in the Cayman Islands." OPIC officials also said that "foreign investors in private-equity funds that they are involved with value the Cayman Islands' reputation for legal neutrality towards investors from different jurisdictions."

The Cayman Islands have worked to promote governance and regulation and have over the years collaborated with governments in the major economies to introduce tax information agreements such as FATCA and co-operation agreements with securities regulators, aimed at promoting a transparent legal regime for global business.

== See also ==
- Corporation Trust Center, Wilmington, Delaware, United States, home to over 285,000 Delaware corporations
