= LGBTQ rights in the United States Virgin Islands =

LGBTQ rights in the U.S. Virgin Islands
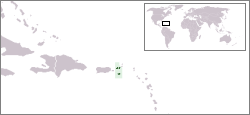
- United States Virgin Islands (U.S.)
- Legal status: Legal since 1985
- Gender identity: Unknown
- Military: Yes
- Discrimination protections: Sexual orientation and gender identity since 2022

Family rights
- Recognition of relationships: Same-sex marriage since 2015
- Adoption: Yes

Lesbian, gay, bisexual, transgender and queer (LGBTQ) rights in the U.S. Virgin Islands have evolved substantially in recent years. Same-sex sexual activity has been legal since 1985. The region also provides explicit legal protections against discrimination for LGBTQ residents since December 2022. Following the Supreme Court's ruling in Obergefell v. Hodges on June 26, 2015, which found the denial of marriage rights to same-sex couples unconstitutional, same-sex marriage became legal in the islands.

== Laws regarding same-sex sexual activity ==
The first anti-gay criminal law was imposed by Denmark. All Danish laws remained in force following the purchase of the islands by the United States in 1917 until specifically changed. In 1921, a new law was passed, establishing a maximum penalty of 10 years' imprisonment for sodomy. A separate law prohibited an assault "with intent to commit ... sodomy" with a penalty of up to 15 years' imprisonment. In 1957, the law's application was extended to include oral sex, whether heterosexual or homosexual. In 1978, the law was challenged in Government v. John as being too vague, but the District Court of the Virgin Islands rejected this argument.

In 1984, the Legislature of the Virgin Islands repealed its sodomy law. This revision formally took effect a year later. Same-sex sexual activity has been legal in the U.S. Virgin Islands since 1985, as long as it occurs between consenting adults in private. Initially, the age of consent was set at 16, but this was raised to 18 in 2017.

== Recognition of same-sex relationships ==
The statutes of the Virgin Islands state that "Marriage is hereby declared to be a civil contract which may be entered into between a male and a female in accordance with the law." However, on June 30, 2015, Governor Kenneth Mapp announced that the islands would comply with the U.S. Supreme Court ruling in Obergefell v. Hodges, recognizing marriage as a fundamental right that cannot be denied to same-sex couples.

=== History ===
In May 2014, Senator Judi Buckley introduced draft legislation in the Legislature of the Virgin Islands to establish same-sex marriage. Called the Civil Marriage Equality Act, it would have replaced the Code's "between a male and a female" with "between two persons". It included language that would have allowed anyone authorized to perform a wedding ceremony to decline to do so for any reason. She anticipated that it would take several months for its language to be reviewed. She expected that she and Governor John de Jongh, who she said would sign the legislation, would leave office in January 2015 before the legislation came to a vote. Supporters of the legislation include Liberty Place, an LGBT advocacy organization based on St. Croix.

In response, a group of church leaders organized One Voice Virgin Islands to oppose the legislation and plan a petition drive that aimed to collect 50,000 signatures. The group authored a letter to V.I. officials that some of its members found objectionable because it included the suggestion that some government officials were homosexual. The group's president, New Vision Ministries Pastor James Petty of St. Thomas, said: "We do not wish to be America's same-sex paradise". Pastor Lennox Zamore said that he rejected the argument that legalizing same-sex marriage would benefit the local economy: "We don't want to balance our books by bringing the sex industry – whether it is same sex or not – to the Virgin Islands". Senator Buckley expressed "disappointment" in the churches, stating that they invoke the Bible only when same-sex marriage is the topic, but not for murder, rape or abuse. Eventually, the bill did not advance before Buckley left office in January 2015.

== Adoption and parenting ==
Following Obergefell v. Hodges, same-sex couples are permitted to adopt in the Virgin Islands. Additionally, lesbian couples may access in vitro fertilisation and other assisted reproduction services. State law recognizes the non-gestational, non-genetic parent as a legal parent of a child born via donor insemination, but only if the parents are in a legally recognized relationship (e.g. marriage).

== Discrimination protections ==
In September 2022, a bill was introduced to explicitly include "sexual orientation and gender identity" to the US Virgin Islands Code (regarding discrimination protections). There has also been a debate when introduced as to it is actually needed - because under federal law that discrimination based on sex, automatically includes sexual orientation during a 2020 SCOTUS ruling. The bill passed the committee and floor stages and went to the Governor's desk. Then in December 2022, the Governor formally signed a bill into law (effective immediately) that passed recently to explicitly include both sexual orientation and gender identity - to legally protect individuals against discrimination on the US Virgin Islands. The US Virgin Islands law addresses discrimination in employment, housing and public accommodations on account of sexual orientation or gender identity. The Virgin Islands Civil Rights Act prohibits such discrimination based on "race, color, religion, sex, sexual orientation, gender identity, national origin, age, or disability".

Discrimination on account of sexual orientation is prohibited by Master Service Providers, who must "provide consistent and equal telecommunication services to all licensees and shall not discriminate" based on a variety of reasons. In addition, the Department of Health has a personnel non-discrimination policy, forbidding discrimination on the basis of sexual orientation and gender identity.

=== Hate crime law ===
The Hate-Motivated Crimes Act, passed in 2014, provides for enhanced penalties for crimes committed based on the victim's "race, color, religion, national origin, sex, ancestry, age, disability, sexual orientation or gender identity".

=== Bullying and discrimination in schools ===
Virgin Islands law requires each school district to "make suitable provisions for instruction in bullying prevention and gang resistance training". "Bullying prevention" is defined as "prevention and strategies for student-centered problem solving all of the following: (1) Intimidation; (2) Student victimization; (3) Sexual harassment; (4) Sexual violence; (5) Sexual, discrimination due to sexual orientation; and (6) Harassment."

In March 2017, Attorney General Claude Walker interpreted the term "sex" as used in the Civil Rights Act to cover transgender students. As the term is not defined in Virgin Islands law, Walker instead chose to follow case law, particularly Price Waterhouse v. Hopkins and Glenn v. Brumby. Walker said:

Given the courts and agency decisions … it appears clear that the term "sex," as used in … Virgin Islands Code, also should be interpreted to mean that in the U.S. Virgin Islands, discrimination against a transgender individual based on that person's transgender status is sex discrimination under the Virgin Islands Civil Rights statute.

Walker instructed the Department of Education to permit transgender students to use bathrooms and locker rooms matching their gender identity.

== Gender identity and expression ==
There exists no statutory ban on changing the gender marker on birth certificates, though no legal regulations are known to exist to do so. The National Center for Transgender Equality reports that "multiple representatives of the Superior Court of USVI stated that they are unaware of a single instance of a petition being received for changing a gender marker. The court representatives were unable to speculate on the outcome of a petition for changing a gender marker." Transgender individuals are permitted to change their name to reflect their gender identity on official documents, including driver's licenses and birth certificates.

== Living conditions ==
The U.S. Virgin Islands, and particularly St. Thomas, had a large LGBT scene from the mid 1960s to the 1980s, even been referred in the media as a "gay mecca". Numerous clubs and bar would openly cater to LGBT clientele. However, with Hurricane Hugo and Hurricane Marilyn, which had massive economic impacts on the islands, as well as the AIDS pandemic, many of these businesses closed. Today, "homosexuality is a very hush hush thing in the Virgin Islands … to identify as openly gay, lesbian, or transgender [is] extremely taboo". While LGBT people may be out to varying degrees, many report occasional or common harassment or abuse, though often non-violent.

Famous LGBT people from the Virgin Islands include professional boxer Emile Griffith.

== Summary table ==
Same-sex sexual activity legal	Yes (Since 1985)
Equal age of consent	Yes
Anti-discrimination laws in employment	Yes (Since 2022)
Anti-discrimination laws in the provision of goods and services	Yes (Since 2022)
Anti-discrimination laws in all other areas (incl. indirect discrimination, hate speech)	Yes (Since 2022)
Hate crime law includes sexual orientation and gender identity	Yes (Since 2014)
Same-sex marriages	Yes (Since 2015)
Recognition of same-sex couples	Yes (Since 2015)
Stepchild adoption by same-sex couples	Yes (Since 2015)
Joint adoption by same-sex couples	Yes (Since 2015)
Gays, lesbians and bisexuals allowed to serve openly in the military	Yes (Since 2011)
Transgender people allowed to serve openly in the military	Yes (Since 2021)
Right to change legal gender	
Access to IVF for lesbians	Yes
Commercial surrogacy for gay male couples	No
MSMs allowed to donate blood	No / Yes (Since 2020; 3-month deferral period)

== See also ==
- Politics of the United States Virgin Islands
- LGBTQ rights in the Americas
- LGBTQ rights in the United States
- LGBTQ rights in the British Virgin Islands
- Same-sex marriage in the United States Virgin Islands
