= Joseph Archibald =

Dr. Joseph Samuel Archibald, QC (27 January 1934 – 3 April 2014) was a Saint Kittitian-born British Virgin Islander jurist, lawyer, registrar, magistrate, former Director of Public Prosecutions, and former Attorney General.

== Biography ==
Archibald was a native of Saint Kitts and Nevis. On 12 July 1960, he was admitted to Bar as a barrister of the Honourable Society of Lincoln's Inn in London. Archibald specialised in civil litigation, commercial law, banking law, international arbitration, property law, and insolvency. He served on the Magistrate's Court, Appellate Court, as well as the Judicial Committee of the Privy Council in the United Kingdom. He was elevated to Queen's Counsel in 1980.

Archibald was appointed Attorney General of St Kitts, Nevis & Anguilla from 1960 to 1964 and from 1966 to 1968. He moved from Saint Kitts to the British Virgin Islands to practice law. He settled on Tortola and founded his law practice, J. S. Archibald and Co. He served in several legal positions in the British Virgin Islands, including tenures as Magistrate, Registrar, Director of Public Prosecutions, Crown Attorney (now known as the Attorney General of the British Virgin Islands), High Court Judge and Court of Appeal judge. In the early 1990s, Archibald was recommended as a potential successor for Sir Lascelles Robotham, who was retiring as Chief Justice of the Eastern Caribbean Supreme Court at the time. Archibald also served as a commissioner on the committee which appoints judges to the Caribbean Court of Justice.

Archibald was one of the first presidents of the BVI Bar Association, a position he held from 1986 until 1994. He also served as a founder and founding president of the Organisation of Eastern Caribbean States (OECS) Bar Association from 1991 until 1996. As president of the OECS Bar Association, Archibald oversaw the ethical standards and rules under which new solicitors and barristers must adhere to to practice before the Eastern Caribbean Supreme Court. Joseph Archibald was reappointed to a second term on the CARICOM Regional Judicial and Legal Services Commission in 2010.

In 1987, he served as the 13th World Law Conference's chairman of the Constitutional Committee at the convention in Seoul, South Korea, where he moderated a discussion on "The Bicentennial of the United States Constitution and its effect on the Constitutions of Asia". He also delivered the inaugural Sir Archibald Nedd Memorial Lecture on 26 July 1996, in Grenada.

Archibald was honoured by the World Jurist Association, which named him as one of its eighteen outstanding members and added his name to the Rule of Law Monument. The University of the West Indies had awarded the Joseph S. Archibald QC International Prize to final year LL.B students since 1990. In October 2005, the University of the West Indies bestowed him with an honorary Degree of Doctor of Laws.

Dr. Archibald died on 3 April 2014, in McNamara, Road Town, British Virgin Islands. He was survived by his wife of 48 years, V. Inez Archibald, who has served as the Deputy Governor of the British Virgin Islands since 2008; their three daughters, and five grandchildren. His funeral was held at the Road Town Methodist Church in Road Town on 26 April 2014. Dignitaries in attendance included Prime Minister of Saint Kitts and Nevis Denzil Douglas. Archibald was buried at the Road Town cemetery.

Political offices
| Preceded by Leo I. Austin | Crown Attorney of the British Virgin Islands; 1964–1965 | Succeeded by Lionel W. Barker |
