= Attorney General of the British Virgin Islands =

Attorney General
- Incumbent; Dawn Smith since 1 October 2020
- Attorney General's Chambers
- Style: The Honourable
- Nominator: Judicial and Legal Services Commission
- Inaugural holder: Lionel W. Barker
- Formation: Virgin Islands Constitution Order, 1967 (Statutory)
- Website: https://bvi.gov.vg/departments/attorney-general-chambers

The Attorney General of the British Virgin Islands is the principal legal adviser to the Government of the British Virgin Islands. Under the Constitution of the British Virgin Islands the attorney general sits ex officio in both the House of Assembly of the British Virgin Islands and in the Cabinet of the British Virgin Islands, but is not permitted to vote in either. The attorney general also sits on the Committee for the Prerogative of Mercy and on the National Security Council.

The attorney general is supported by two senior law officers: the solicitor general (in relation to civil matters) and the director of public prosecutions (in relation to criminal matters). When appearing in court, by convention the attorney general sits one row in from the row reserved for King's Counsel.

As of 1 October 2020, the attorney general is Dawn Smith.

== History ==
The office traces its origins back to the reintroduction of democracy in the British Virgin Islands pursuant to the 1950 general election. At that time the Legislative Council (as the House of Assembly was then known) had to look to the attorney general of the Leeward Islands for support. This was regarded as unsatisfactory and following the 1954 general election Herman Besson was appointed to the title of legal assistant to the Legislative Council. In 1959 the title of the office was changed to Crown attorney, and subsequent to the introduction of Ministerial Government following the 1967 general election the office was titled attorney general.

== Qualifications ==
Since 2007 in order to be qualified to be appointed as Attorney General a person must be eligible to be admitted as a lawyer in the British Virgin Islands, and must have not less than 10 years experience practising law. However, this was not always the case, and various past Attorneys General were either not admitted in the British Virgin Islands and in some cases were not even eligible to be admitted in the British Virgin Islands.

By law only a Belonger to the Virgin Islands may be appointed to the office of Attorney General unless, in the opinion of the Judicial and Legal Services Commission, there is no such person who is suitably qualified and able and willing to be so appointed. In practice, almost all the attorneys general appointed since 2007 have been non-Belongers, and only two attorneys general in the history of the British Virgin Islands was a belonger at the time they were appointed (Dancia Penn, and the current attorney general, Dawn Smith).

== List of attorneys general of the British Virgin Islands ==
A total of 27 persons have been appointed to the office (including as Crown attorney or legal assistant prior to 1967, and persons who were appointed as acting attorney general), of whom 20 have been men and seven have been women. Three have been Queen's Counsel (although two were appointed to the rank during office), and the remaining 24 have been from the Outer bar or solicitors during their time as attorney general. The longest-serving attorney general to date has been Cherno Jallow, who served just under eight years (including time as acting attorney general).

For attorneys general prior to 1954 see Attorney General of the Leeward Islands

Attorneys general of the British Virgin Islands
Office holder	Title of office	Dates
Herman A. Besson	Legal Assistant	1954–1958
Oliver M. Browne	Crown Attorney	1958–1959
George A. Redhead	Crown Attorney	1959–1962
John A.B. Barwick, QC	Crown Attorney	1962–1964
Leo I. Austin	Crown Attorney	1964
J.S. Archibald	Crown Attorney	1964 - February 1965
Lionel W. Barker	Crown Attorney	1965 - March 1967
Lionel W. Barker	Attorney General	March 1967 - 1968
William L. MacIntyre	Attorney General (acting)	1968–1970
Edgar A.C. Hewlett	Attorney General (acting)	1970
Nolan Jacobs	Attorney General (acting)	1970–1972
Paula F. Beaubrun	Attorney General (acting)	17 July 1972 – 30 June 1973
Paula F. Beaubrun	Attorney General	1 July 1973 – 25 July 1977
Clare I. Roberts	Attorney General (acting)	1977
Jack Smith Hughes, OBE	Attorney General (acting)	1977
Michael J. Bradley	Attorney General (acting)	1977–1978
Velma I. Hamilton-Gayle	Attorney General (acting)	28 November 1978 – 10 October 1979
Sandra M.H. DeSilva	Attorney General	1979–1982
Lewis Hunte	Attorney General	1982–1986
Karl S. Atterbury	Attorney General	1986–1990
Donald A.B. Trotman	Attorney General	1990–1992
Dancia Penn, QC, OBE	Attorney General	1 October 1992 - 1999
Davidson K. Baptiste	Attorney General (acting)	1993
Cherno Jallow, QC	Attorney General (acting)	1 November 1999 – 21 February 2000
Cherno Jallow, QC	Attorney General	22 February 2000 - 2007
Kathleen Ayensu	Attorney General	24 June 2007 – 24 June 2010
Baba Aziz	Attorney General (acting)	24 June 2010 – 6 November 2011
Dr Christopher Malcom	Attorney General	7 November 2011 – 31 December 2014
Baba Aziz	Attorney General	1 January 2015 – 30 September 2020
Dawn Smith	Attorney General	1 October 2020 – Present
Mr Arden Warner also acted as Attorney General (acting) on various occasions for short terms.

== See also ==
- Justice ministry
- Politics of the British Virgin Islands
