= British Virgin Islands Criminal Code =

The British Virgin Islands Criminal Code (No 1 of 1997) is a statute of the British Virgin Islands which consolidates almost all of the indictable offences under the Territory's criminal law.

The Code was passed into law by the Legislative Council on 1 April 1997, received Royal Assent on 1 May 1997, and was brought into force on 1 September 1997.

It is sometimes mistakenly said that the Code contains all of the Territory's criminal laws, but this is not the case. The Act expressly preserves offences under other enactments, as well as offences at common law.

== Parts ==
After the preamble and various preliminary matters, the Act is divided into 21 parts as follows:

- Part I – General rules as to criminal liability.
- Part II – Punishments
- Part III – Offences against Government and public order
- Part IV – Offences against the administration of lawful authority
- Part V – Offences relating to the administration of justice
- Part VI – Offences relating to religion
- Part VII – Sexual offences
- Part VIII – Abortion
- Part IX – Offences relating to marriage
- Part X – Genocide
- Part XI – Homicide and other offences against the person
- Part XII – Neglect endangering life or health
- Part XIII – Abduction, kidnapping and similar crimes
- Part XIV – Offences relating to property
- Part XV – Forgery, coining and counterfeiting
- Part XVI – Personation
- Part XVII – Criminal damage and similar offences
- Part XVIII – Criminal libel
- Part XIX – Nuisance and other offences against the public in general
- Part XX – Conspiracy, attempt and assisting offenders
- Part XXI – Miscellaneous
