= Mourant =

Offshore magic circle law firm

- Headquarters: St Helier, Jersey
- No. of offices: 9
- Offices: BVI, Cayman Islands, Guernsey, Hong Kong, Singapore, Jersey, London, Mauritius, Luxembourg
- No. of attorneys: 250
- Major practice areas: offshore financial services
- Date founded: 2010
- Company type: Limited partnership
- Website: mourant.com

Mourant is an offshore law firm headquartered in Saint-Helier, Jersey. Mourant is one of the largest offshore law firms, with just over 70 partners and 700+ staff. It is a member of the offshore magic circle.

== History ==
Mourant is the result of successive mergers of various law firms, most recently that of Mourant du Feu & Jeune and Ozannes in 2010. In the same year, the Mourant group sells Mourant International Finance Administration to State Street, Mourant Private Wealth to RBC and Mourant Equity Compensation Solutions to HBOS. In 2018, it changed its name from "Mourant Ozannes LP" back to "Mourant LP".

== Offices ==
While primarily based in Jersey, Mourant has offices in other jurisdictions such as the British Virgin Islands, the Cayman Islands, Guernsey, Hong Kong, Singapore, Mauritius, Luxembourg and the United Kingdom. The tax avoidance campaign group ActionAid reported that more than 200 companies belonging to at least 26 multinational companies have subsidiaries incorporated in Jersey at 22 Grenville Street, Mourant's headquarters.

== Awards and recognition ==
The firm won offshore firm of the year from The Lawyer in 2020 and 2021.
