= Maples Group =

Offshore magic circle tax law firm

Coordinates: 19.2920°N 81.3854°W

- Headquarters: Ugland House; 121 South Church Street; George Town, Cayman Islands
- No. of offices: 17
- Offices: Cayman Islands, British Virgin Islands, Dublin, London, Dubai, Hong Kong, Singapore and Jersey
- No. of lawyers: 330
- Major practice areas: Tax law
- Key people: Jonathan Green (Managing Partner)
- Date founded: 1962 McDonald & Maples
- Founder: Jim McDonald; John Maples
- Company type: Limited liability partnership
- Website: Maples Group

Maples Group (previously Maples and Calder) is a multi-jurisdictional firm providing legal and financial services, headquartered in the Cayman Islands. It has offices in many financial centres around the world, including several tax neutral jurisdictions. Its law firm is a member of the offshore magic circle, and specialises in advising on the laws of the Cayman Islands, Ireland, Luxembourg, Jersey and the British Virgin Islands, across a range of legal services including commercial litigation, intellectual property, sport, and finance, in which the firm has a focus on the structuring of tax efficient legal structures (or vehicles).

== History ==
MacDonald and Maples was founded by Jim MacDonald and John Maples. MacDonald later retired and Douglas Calder joined as a partner, resulting in the name of the firm being changed to Maples and Calder. Today it is referred to simply as Maples and is headquartered in Ugland House in the Cayman Islands.

The Cayman Islands office was opened in the early 1960s, followed by the Hong Kong office in 1995. Three years later, the London office opened its doors, with the British Virgin Islands and Dubai office establishing a presence in 2004 and 2005 respectively. Maples and Calder opened a Dublin office in 2006. 2012 saw the opening of a second office in Asia, when their Singapore office opened in September 2012.

Jonathan Green is the firm's global managing partner and is based in the Cayman Islands office.

The firm rebranded from "Maples and Calder" to the "Maples Group" in 2019.

== Practice areas ==
The principal focus is on tax management (e.g. structuring and domiciling of tax vehicles, corporate transactions for IP–based and Debt–based erosion and profit shifting (or BEPS) actions). Maples and Calder also offers a range of other tax focused legal services, including providing advice on major infrastructure and property development projects (domiciled in offshore tax havens or corporate tax havens), and the establishment and structuring of a "physical presence" in tax havens such as the Cayman Islands and Dublin, including business licensing, real estate, immigration and employment law.

In 2009, U.S. President Barack Obama, described the headquarters of the Maples Group, Ugland House, the then legal home of 12,000 U.S. corporations as: "That's either the biggest building in the world or the biggest tax scam in the world".

== Awards ==
Maples Group has maintained its position as the largest Cayman Islands law firm, holding top rankings for finance, corporate, investment funds and litigation in legal directories such as Chambers and Partners, Legal 500, and Practical Law Company (PLC), and is the only offshore magic circle law firm to ever achieve Tier 1 in every category of the International Financial Law Review (IFLR).

== Locations ==
Maples Group maintains a multi-jurisdictional network of offices in leading Caribbean and Channel Islands offshore tax havens such as the Cayman Islands, British Virgin Islands, Dubai, and Jersey. As with other offshore magic circle law firms, Maples and Calder have also opened up offices in the major corporate tax havens, and particularly Dublin and Singapore (see Conduit and Sink OFCs).

== See also ==
- Tax havens
- Corporate tax havens
- Tax avoidance
- Matheson (law firm)
