= Hong Kong insolvency law =

Financial regulation in Hong Kong

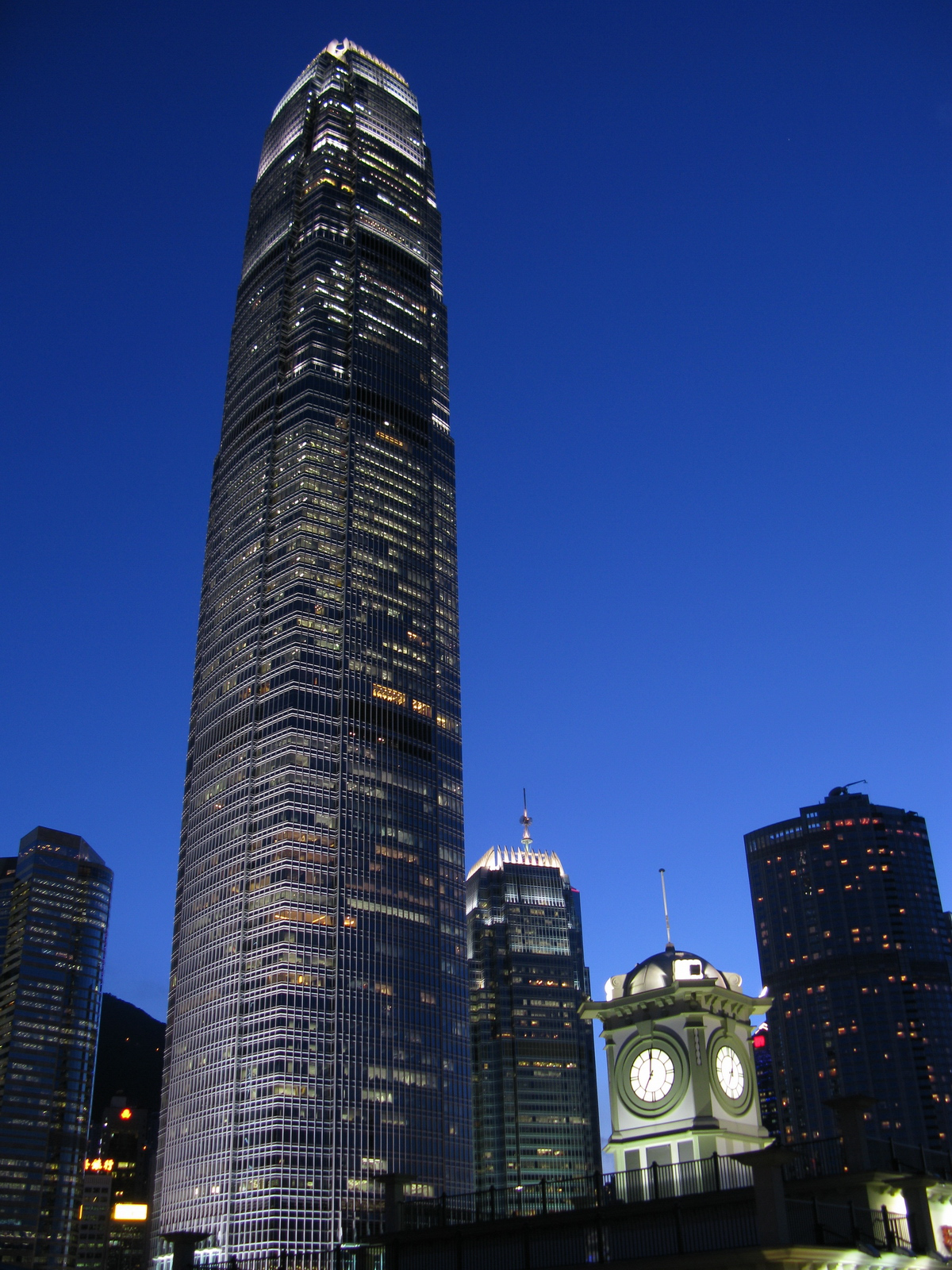
2 IFC in the heart of Hong Kong's financial district.

Hong Kong insolvency law regulates the position of companies which are in financial distress and are unable to pay or provide for all of their debts or other obligations, and matters ancillary to and arising from financial distress. The law in this area is now primarily governed by the Companies (Winding Up and Miscellaneous Provisions) Ordinance (Cap 32) and the Companies (Winding Up) Rules (Cap 32H). Prior to 2012 Cap 32 was called the Companies Ordinance, but when the Companies Ordinance (Cap 622) came into force in 2014, most of the provisions of Cap 32 were repealed except for the provisions relating to insolvency, which were retained and the statute was renamed to reflect its new principal focus.

Under Hong Kong law, the term insolvency is usually used with reference to companies, and bankruptcy is used in relation to individuals. Personal bankruptcy is regulated by the Bankruptcy Act (Cap 6).

The objectives underpinning Hong Kong insolvency law have been described as follows:

The fundamental purpose of corporate insolvency law is to resolve all claims against insolvent companies, and provide a fair and orderly process for realising and collecting the assets of insolvent companies and distributing them among creditors in accordance with the statutory scheme of distribution.
(at paragraph 1.1)

== Winding up ==
A company may go into winding up either voluntarily or by order of the court. A company enters voluntary winding up by passing a special resolution to appoint a liquidator. If the company is solvent when it enters voluntary winding up it is said to be in members' voluntary winding up, and if it is insolvent it is said to be in creditors' voluntary winding up.

A company may be wound up by the courts on several grounds. These are:

1. the company has by special resolution resolved that the company be wound up by the court;
2. the company does not commence its business within a year from its incorporation, or suspends its business for a whole year;
3. the company has no members;
4. the company is unable to pay its debts;
5. the event, if any, occurs on the occurrence of which the articles provide that the company is to be dissolved;
6. the court is of opinion that it is just and equitable that the company should be wound up.

In practice the most important grounds tend to be insolvency (the fourth ground) and just and equitable winding up (the sixth ground). Just and equitable winding up is usually unrelated to the solvency of the company.

A petition to the court for the winding up of a company may be presented by the company itself, or by any creditor or creditors (including any contingent or prospective creditor or creditors), contributory or contributories or the trustee in bankruptcy or the personal representative of a contributory. For these purposes a contributory broadly means a shareholder or other type of member of the company. Liquidation is a class right, and so the court will not normally make an order upon the application of a creditor if it is opposed by a majority of creditors. However the court may give lower weight to creditors who are connected to the company as either directors or shareholders when considering what is in the best interests of the creditors as a whole.

=== Effect of an order ===
If the court makes an order winding up the company, then any disposition of the property of the company and any transfer of the company's shares made after the commencement of the winding up, is, unless the court otherwise orders, void. However the commencement of winding up is deemed to relate back to the time when the petition was presented. Accordingly, all dispositions of property or transfers of shares made between the time of the lodging of the petition and the making of the order are set aside unless the court orders.

Further, when a winding up order has been made no action or proceeding may be commenced or proceeded with against the company except by leave of the court. However this will not normally prevent a secured creditor from enforcing its security through an out of court process. Where a secured creditor wishes to enforce their security through court action, leave will normally be granted.

== Insolvency ==
The test for insolvency under Hong Kong law is whether a company is unable to pay its debts. A company is deemed to be unable to pay its debts in the following circumstances:

1. if a creditor, by assignment or otherwise, to whom the company is indebted in a sum then due equal to or exceeding the specified amount, has served on the company, by leaving it at the registered office of the company, a demand under his hand requiring the company to pay the sum so due, and the company has for 3 weeks thereafter neglected to pay the sum, or to secure or compound for it to the reasonable satisfaction of the creditor; or
2. if execution or other process issued on a judgment, decree or order of any court in favour of a creditor of the company is returned unsatisfied in whole or in part; or
3. if it is proved to the satisfaction of the court that the company is unable to pay its debts, and, in determining whether a company is unable to pay its debts, the court shall take into account the contingent and prospective liabilities of the company.

Where a company is deemed to be unable to pay its debts, this has a number of other effects in addition to the ability for a creditor to present a petition to wind it up. It also means that the directors are expected to discharge their duties in the best interest of the company's creditors rather than its shareholders; that transactions may be potentially vulnerable as voidable transactions, and that the right of creditors to set-off mutual debts may become impaired in relation to debts which are incurred during the period of insolvency.

== Liquidation ==
Once a liquidator is appointed the company is said to be in liquidation, or in winding up. The duty of the liquidator is to take possession and control of all of the assets which the company is beneficially entitled to, sell (or liquidate) them, and then distribute the proceeds among the creditors in accordance with the statutory scheme of priorities. The liquidator also has wide powers, including (amongst other things) the power to (a) to bring or defend any action or other legal proceeding in the name and on behalf of the company, and (b) to carry on the business of the company, so far as may be necessary for the beneficial winding up thereof.

The priority of claims is broadly as follows:

1. liquidator's costs and expenses
2. preferential creditors
3. unsecured creditors

As between themselves, the claimants in each level rank pari passu as between themselves. Preferential claims are mostly sums due to employees (up to a limit) and certain sums due to Government.

Secured creditors do not normally participate in the liquidation process and will normally have a prior ranking claim to any assets over which they have a security interest (and so will normally take ahead of all the claimants above). As between themselves, the priorities between claimants is determined by the law of priority as to who has a first ranking claim. The one exception to this is floating charge holders. By statute floating charge holders are subordinated to preferred creditors, although under complex rules still rank ahead of liquidator's claims.

If after the payment of all of the creditors' claims there are any surplus funds left over, they are distributed to the members of the company in accordance with their entitlements. Thereafter the company is dissolved and ceases to exist.

=== The insolvent estate ===
The liquidator has no better claim to any assets than the company did. Accordingly, this means the liquidator is not entitled to have recourse to:

1. assets which are in the company's possession but are owned by another party (for example, under a retention of title arrangement);
2. assets which the company holds on trust for others;
3. assets which are subject to a valid security interest.

The liquidator has powers to disclaim any onerous property or unprofitable contracts. Any person suffering loss by such disclaimer may claim against the insolvent estate as an unsecured creditor.

=== Set-off ===
Curiously the Companies (Winding Up and Miscellaneous Provisions) Ordinance makes no express provision for insolvency set-off within the statute itself, and instead, the relevant provisions are incorporated by reference from the Bankruptcy Ordinance. Any sums which are owed by a creditor to the company are set-off against sums which are owed by the company to that creditor. In order for insolvency set-off to operate there must be strict mutuality between the claims (in that the company and creditor must both be beneficially entitled to the relevant debts, not merely claimants as agents or trustees for another party). The rules of insolvency set-off are mandatory, and it is not possible to contract out of them. The right to insolvency set-off is not if the creditor was aware that a winding-up petition had been presented at the time credit was extended to the company.

=== Provisional liquidation ===
If, upon the application for the appointment of a liquidator, there are concerns about potential dissipation of assets, or misconduct on the part of the directors, then the court may order the appointment of a provisional liquidator. Provisional liquidation is essentially an "emergency procedure".

In Hong Kong there are three types of provisional liquidators. There are "traditional" provisional liquidators, appointed under section 193; there are also provisional liquidators appointed pursuant to a members' voluntary liquidation under section 228A, and there are "Panel T" appointments under section 194(1A) whereby the Official Receiver is appointed as provisional liquidator.

In practice, most instances of applications for a provisional liquidator involve some kind of fraud or other misconduct. The applicant will normally need to show that (a) it is likely that a winding up order will be made at the hearing of the petition; and (b) the company's assets are at risk prior to the hearing of the petition (which includes either dissipation of the company's assets, or the potential loss or destruction of the company's books and records. Accordingly, it will normally be necessary to establish either (or both) that: (a) the company is clearly insolvent, and it is likely that a winding up order will be made at the hearing of the petition; and/or (b) there has been the type of misconduct that would justify a just and equitable winding up. An appointment of a provisional liquidator may also be made where it is in the public interest.

Since the decision in the Legend case in 2005 provisional liquidation may not be used as a means of shielding the company from creditor's claims to facilitate a restructuring in Hong Kong, although prior to that date the practice was relatively common.

== Voidable transactions ==
Separately from the provisions relating to the avoidance of transaction between the petition for winding up and the order, there are several other grounds upon which a transaction entered into by the company during the "twilight period" prior to going into liquidation may be challenged. Conceptually these powers to avoid transactions are sometimes viewed as a logical extension of the anti-deprivation rule.

- Unfair preferences. Any transfer of an interest property by a company (including the grant of any security interest) or other similar act relating to property made or done by or against a company within 6-month period (or 2 years prior to the commencement of the liquidation if the transaction was with an "associate") before the commencement of the company's winding up which was influenced by the desire to prefer a particular creditor, then the liquidator may apply for the court to declare the transaction invalid.
- Extortionate credit transactions. Where a company has entered into a credit transaction in the 3 years prior to going into liquidation, the liquidation may challenge that transaction as an extortionate credit transaction if having regard to the risk accepted by the person providing the credit, either (a) the terms of it are or were such as to require grossly exorbitant payments to be made (whether unconditionally or in certain contingencies) in respect of the provision of credit; or (b) it otherwise grossly contravenes ordinary principles of fair dealing. If the court is satisfied that a transaction is an extortionate credit transaction, it may set it aside in whole or in part.
- Voidable floating charges. Where a company goes into liquidation, and the company created a floating charge on the assets and undertaking of the company within the 12 months prior to the commencement of the winding up, then unless it can be proved that the company was solvent at the relevant time, that floating charge is invalid except to the amount of any cash paid to the company in consideration for the charge granting of the floating charge.

However, one category of voidable transactions which is a feature of many other common law jurisdictions but which is not part of Hong Kong law is the power to challenge transactions as undervalue transactions.

Separately, although not part of the insolvency regime in Hong Kong, there is a power to set aside transactions which were entered into with intent to defraud creditors under section 60 of the Conveyancing and Property Ordinance (Cap 219). This does not affect the title to any property obtained by a party in good faith and without notice of the intention to defraud.

== Directors' duties ==
If a company becomes insolvent, then the board of directors ceases to owe its duties to the shareholders - it owes its duty to act in the best interests of the creditors, being the persons who are beneficially entitled to the company's assets.

If the company subsequently goes into liquidation, then the directors remain in office but they are effectively divested of all of their powers of management and the liquidator takes control and custody of the assets and the business and affairs of the company.

If in the course of the winding up of a company it appears that any business of the company has been carried on with intent to defraud creditors of the company or creditors of any other person or for any fraudulent purpose, the court may, if it thinks proper so to do, declare that any persons who were knowingly parties to the carrying on of the business in manner aforesaid shall be personally responsible, without any limitation of liability, for all or any of the debts or other liabilities of the company as the court may direct.

Under Hong Kong law there is at present no liability for what is commonly referred to as wrongful trading or trading while insolvent in other jurisdictions.

== Schemes of arrangement ==
In the absence of any specific corporate rehabilitation process, schemes of arrangement have been described as "the only tool currently available to facilitate the rescue of distressed companies". Schemes of arrangement are regulated under the Companies Ordinance.

Broadly, when a company in financial difficulties, it will put together a proposal to be presented to its creditors and shareholders. This proposal will usually seek to compromise and/or extend the company's debts, often with the aim of enabling the business continuing to operate. Part of the debt may be converted into equity. Under a scheme creditors usually need to be willing to accept less than the full amount that they are owed. Normally they will only do so when the scheme offers a prospect of better rates of return than a liquidation.

In order for the proposed scheme to be approved, it is necessary for each class of creditors or members to approve the scheme by both (a) 75% in value, and (b) a majority in number. How each class is defined is determined by the court, but the litmus test is the members of each class must have a sufficient "community of interest" that their views on the scheme should be considered together.

For many years the practice in Hong Kong was to try and shield the company from its creditors whilst trying to implement a scheme of arrangement by asking the courts to appoint a provisional liquidator, but that practice was effectively abolished by the courts in 2005.

== Cross-border insolvency ==
Hong Kong has not introduced the UNCITRAL Model Law on Cross-Border Insolvency into domestic legislation. Accordingly, cross-border insolvency cases are still conducted upon an ad hoc basis using a form of modified universalism. The courts do have power to wind up a foreign company if it can be shown to have a sufficient connection with Hong Kong. However the court are very reluctant to exercise this power. Normally it will be necessary to establish that:

1. the foreign company has a sufficient connection with Hong Kong;
2. there is a reasonable possibility that the winding up will benefit those applying for the order; and
3. the court must be able to exercise jurisdiction over one or more persons interested in the distribution of the foreign company's assets.

However, where a letter of request is issued by a foreign court, the Hong Kong courts may demonstrate more flexibility in relation to the making of an order with respect to a foreign company.
