= Australian insolvency law =

Australian insolvency law regulates the position of companies which are in financial distress and are unable to pay or provide for all of their debts or other obligations, and matters ancillary to and arising from financial distress. The law in this area is principally governed by the Corporations Act 2001. Under Australian law, the term insolvency is usually used with reference to companies, and bankruptcy is used in relation to individuals. Insolvency law in Australia tries to seek an equitable balance between the competing interests of debtors, creditors and the wider community when debtors are unable to meet their financial obligations. The aim of the legislative provisions is to provide:

- an orderly and fair procedure to handle the affairs of insolvent companies;
- to ensure a pari passu equal distribution of the assets amongst creditors;
- to ensure claims against the insolvent company are resolved with the minimum of delay and expense;
- to rehabilitate financially distressed companies and businesses where viable;
- to engage with key stakeholders in the resolution of insolvency issues; and
- providing for the examination of insolvent companies and their representatives, and the reasons for their failure.

== Insolvency ==
A company, partnership, or trust with multiple trustees, is legally insolvent if it is not able to pay its their debts, as and when they become due and payable. Solvency and insolvency are defined so as to be mutually exclusive.

The common law has also established various indicators of insolvency. These indicators include amongst others:

- Continuing losses;
- Liquidity ratios below 1;
- Overdue commonwealth and state taxes;
- Poor relationship with bank or other financial institution culminating in an inability to borrow further funds;
- An inability to raise further equity capital; and
- Suppliers placing the company on COD or otherwise demanding ransom payments for continual supply.

=== Presumptions of insolvency ===
In certain circumstances a debtor may be presumed to be insolvent without the need to actually prove financial insolvency. A company will be presumed to be insolvent if, during or after the three months preceding the day on which an application was made for the winding-up of the company, any one of the following six situations occurs.

1. the company failed to comply with a statutory demand;
2. execution process issued on a judgment in favour of a creditor was returned wholly or partly unsatisfied;
3. in relation to a floating charge:
  1. a receiver was appointed;
  2. an order was made for the appointment of a receiver;
  3. a person assumed control of company property; or
  4. a person was appointed to enter into possession or assume control of company property.

=== Statutory demands ===
A popular way for a creditor to prove that a company is insolvent is to serve a statutory demand pursuant to section 459E of the Corporations Act. Issuing and serving a statutory demand is a relatively simple and inexpensive process when compared against proving actual financial insolvency. Statutory demands are regulated by Part 5.4, Divisions 2 and 3 of the Corporations Act, and the Courts require that the regime be strictly adhered to. Because a company will irrefutably be presumed to insolvent where a statutory demand is not complied with, the Court requires creditors to ensure that demands are expressed in clear, accurate and unambiguous terms. Even a small error may result in the statutory demand being set aside by the Court. The statute specifies the form of the demand, and requires that the demand must:

1. state the debt claimed, or if the demand relates to two or more debts it must specify the total amount of the debts;
2. require the debtor company to pay the debt within 21 days (or 6 months during COVID-19 as part of temporary measures);
3. must be in writing in the prescribed form (Form 509H); and
4. must be signed by or on behalf of the creditor.

==== Requirements ====
In relation to the debt to which the demand relates:

- the debt must be due and payable - it cannot be contingent, prospective or unliquidated;
- a creditor may not serve a demand at the same time as taking proceedings against the debtors company's directors in relation to the same alleged debt as this would constitute an abuse of process;

The demand must be served on the company by leaving it at its registered office, sending it by post to that office, or delivering a copy of the demand personally to the director of the company.

Upon being served with a valid demand, the debtor may either pay the debt, or secure or compound the debt to the creditor's reasonable satisfaction. Failure to do so within 21 days (unless an extension is granted) will mean that insolvency of the debtor is presumed and the creditor may use that presumption in order to make a winding-up application to the Court.

==== Setting aside a statutory demand ====
A debtor company can also apply to set aside a statutory demand on various grounds. These include:

- where there is a genuine dispute about the existence of the debt;
- where the company has an offsetting claim;
- where there is a defect in the demand and substantial injustice will be caused; and/or
- where there is some other reason why the demand should be set aside.

===== Genuine Dispute =====
Various cases in Australia have decided what a genuine dispute is, and is not. A genuine dispute should:

1. Show a plausible contention requiring investigation;
2. Be bona fide, genuine and real;
3. Be in good faith and show a prima facie plausibility;
4. Truly exist in fact, and contain a serious question to be tried;
5. Be something more than mere bluster or mere assertion;
6. Be a claim that may have some substance;
7. Have a sufficient degree of cogency to be arguable;
8. Have objective existence; and
9. Have sufficient factual particularity.

A genuine dispute should not:

1. Be spurious, hypothetical, illusory or misconceived;
2. Be plainly vexatious or frivolous;
3. Be so devoid of substance that no further investigation is warranted;
4. Be merely spurious claim, bluster or assertion; and
5. Be merely fanciful or futile.

===== Offsetting Claim =====
You may also set aside a statutory demand if you have an offsetting claim.

Section 459H(1)(b) of the Corporations Act 2001 (Cth) says:

(1) This section applies where, on an application under section 459G, the Court is satisfied…
(b) that the company has an offsetting claim.

Then goes on to define an offsetting claim to mean:

“offsetting claim” means a genuine claim that the company has against the respondent by way of counterclaim, set-off or cross-demand (even if it does not arise out of the same transaction or circumstances as a debt to which the demand relates).

This means that any claim that you have against the person/company issuing the demand, can be used to set aside the demand. Especially if the offsetting claim means that the offset total of the demand drops below the statutory minimum.

===== Defect in the Demand Causing Substantial Injustice =====
A statutory demand can also be set aside pursuant to section 459J(1)(a) if because of a defect in the demand, substantial injustice will be caused unless the demand is set aside.

Section 9 of the Corporations Act defines the word "defect" to mean:

“defect“, in relation to a statutory demand, includes:
(a) an irregularity; and
(b) a misstatement of an amount or total; and
(c) a misdescription of a debt or other matter; and
(d) a misdescription of a person or entity.

However, a simple defect is not enough to allow the demand to be set aside, it must cause substantial injustice.

There are a number of cases in Australia which have decided what a defect in a demand which will cause substantial injustice is. Some examples of this are:

- Misstatement of a Debt, Amount, or Total;
- Incorrect Interest Calculation;
- Defect in the Names of the Parties;

There are also cases in Australia which have decided that certain defects in the demand do not cause substantial injustice. Some examples are:

- Where the notes and warning have been deleted;
- Whether the demand is so defective it becomes a nullity;
- The omission of an address for service for interstate demands;
- The omission of a signature from a statutory demand.

==== Effect ====
If a company fails to satisfy a statutory demand, or have it set aside, then it is presumed to be insolvent. The company requires leave of the court to before it can challenge the debt in opposing an application to wind up the company. The effect of the presumption is that the company has to prove that it is solvent.

=== Bankruptcy term ===
On 19 October 2017 The Australian Federal Parliament proposed a bill is to reduce the period of bankruptcy from three years to one year. According to this bill, after one year, a person will not be required to disclose his status as bankrupt. Furthermore, it states that after one year, a bankrupt would be able to travel without prior permission.

== Liquidation ==
Liquidation is the process whereby the assets of a company are collected and realised by a liquidator, and the proceeds are subsequently applied to discharge all relevant debts and liabilities in accordance with the priorities set by law. Any balance which may remain after paying the costs and expenses of winding-up is then distributed among the members according to their respective rights and interests.

A company may be wound up on either a voluntary basis or on a compulsory basis.

=== Types of liquidation ===
There are three different types of winding-up:

- members' voluntary winding-up
- creditors' voluntary winding-up
- compulsory winding-up

==== Members' voluntary winding-up ====
A members' voluntary winding-up is not technically an insolvency process. It is a voluntary liquidation entered into by the members where the company is not insolvent. The process is initiated by a special resolution of the company, and the creditors have no direct involvement and are repaid in full. The directors are required to give a declaration as to the solvency of the company which must be filed with the Australian Securities & Investments Commission (ASIC).

Where a liquidator who is appointed pursuant to a members' voluntary winding-up subsequently determines that the company is in fact insolvent in his opinion (contrary to the solvency declaration made by the board of directors), then the liquidator must either (a) apply to the Court for the company to be wound-up on an insolvent basis, (b) appoint an administrator to the company, or (c) convene a meeting of creditors. If a meeting of the creditors is convened, then from the time of the meeting the winding-up will be treated as a creditors' voluntary winding-up.

==== Creditors' voluntary winding-up ====
A creditors' voluntary winding-up is also initiated by the members but (in contrast to a members' voluntary winding-up) where it has been determined that the company is insolvent. The process normally occurs where the board of directors has determined that the company is insolvent and then recommended to the members that it be wound up. However, as noted above, it may also be initiated by a liquidator was originally appointed pursuant to members voluntary winding-up where the liquidator has subsequently formed the opinion that the company is actually insolvent.

==== Compulsory winding-up ====
A compulsory liquidation is usually the result of an action taken by one or more creditors of an insolvent company. Compulsory liquidation is a statutory procedure which enables a person to apply to the Court for an order that the affairs of a company be wound-up. A number of different people have locus standi to initiate compulsory liquidation proceedings, including not only the company's creditors (who are the most common applicants), but also the company itself, the company's members, the liquidator, Australian Securities & Investments Commission (ASIC), Australian Taxation Office (ATO), and (in respect of a general insurance company) the Australian Prudential Regulation Authority (APRA). But in most cases compulsory liquidation will normally be commenced by one or more creditors.

=== Commencement of winding-up proceedings ===
In a compulsory winding up, the day on which the relevant Court order is made will constitute the date of the commencement of the winding up. The date on which the application to wind up the company was filed is called the relation-back day. Whether the liquidation process is initiated by an order of the Court or through a creditors' voluntary winding up, a liquidator will be appointed to administer the winding up of the affairs of the company.

=== The liquidator ===
The liquidator is the principal officer of the company who is appointed to conduct the winding-up process. Where the company is insolvent, the liquidation will invariably be an accountant who is an insolvency professional.

==== Appointment ====
In a compulsory winding up the Court will appoint the liquidator to the company. Generally it will act upon the nomination of the party making the application. In a voluntary winding up, the liquidator will be appointed by the members or creditors of a company. Liquidators are required to be members of the Institute of Chartered Accountants of Australia or CPA Australia. They must be an independent person and be seen to be fully independent.

==== Role of the liquidator ====
The liquidator's role has been described as a hybrid role with elements of fiduciary trustee, agent, officer of the corporation and in some instances officer of the Court. The liquidator owes fiduciary duties to the company, its creditors and members. The liquidator is required to act honestly, fairly and impartially at all times, and must avoid any conflicts of interest.

Liquidators should exercise their powers and discharge their duties with the degree of care and diligence that a reasonable person would exercise if they were a director or officer of a corporation if the corporation's circumstances and occupied the office held by, and had the same responsibilities within the corporation as, the director or officer.

Upon the appointment of the liquidator, all of the powers of the directors are suspended and the company itself will cease to carry on business except to the extent that the liquidator believes it will assist the beneficial disposal of the business. The liquidator will take over operation of the company and can deal with the property of the company. The functions of the liquidator are to:

- wind-up the affairs of the company;
- ascertain and recover the property of the company;
- to distribute the company's assets equitably among its creditors; and
- to examine the circumstances which precipitated the liquidation and which may reveal improper dispositions of property and criminal offences.

==== Duties of the liquidator ====
Liquidators are subject to a number of duties, including fiduciary duties to the company itself. In relation to the administration of the liquidation the statutory duties of the liquidator include:

- To ascertain and take possession of all the assets of the company. The liquidator is empowered to take into custody all property which the company is or appears to be entitled to.
- To preserve the assets of the company by taking an inventory, insuring the assets, investing funds wisely and defending any claims initiated against the company to recover assets or claim for damages;
- A duty to liquidate and realise the value of the assets for the benefit of the company;
- A duty to report and investigate on the affairs of the company, including settling a list of contributories and ascertaining the liabilities of the company;
- Administrative duties which require certain documents to be lodged with governmental bodies, and the keeping of accurate accounts and records of all matters relating to the liquidation.

=== Company property ===
The liquidator is entitled to all the assets belonging to the company at the commencement of the winding up. But:

- the liquidator is not entitled to property which is subject to a valid security interest, or which is held on trust for another person;
- the liquidator is not entitled to goods in the company's possession that the company holds as bailee or which are subject to a valid retention of title clause; and
- aside from current assets, the liquidator can also recover property or money from other persons, or seek to enhance the pool of estates by pursuing claims on behalf of the company.

Any property of the company which is disposed of after the deemed commencement of winding-up (other than by the liquidator in the exercise of his or her powers) is void unless validated by the Court.

==== Collateral for security ====
Any property of the company which is subject to a valid security interest is not considered part of the insolvent estate, and the insolvency process does not prevent a secured creditor from enforcing their rights over the relevant collateral.

==== Onerous property ====
The liquidator also has power to disclaim any onerous property or contracts of the company in liquidation with the leave of the Court. Any damages due to a counterparty to a contract which has been disclaimed may be proved as a debt in the winding-up.

=== Claims ===
Any creditor wishing to make a claim with respect to a debt due from the company must formally make and prove the claim in accordance with the regulations. A secured creditor will not normally make a claim in the liquidation unless there is a shortfall in the collateral provided by the insolvent company. However, if a secured creditor wishes to do so, it may release its security, and claim in the winding-up for the full amount.

==== Insolvency set-off ====
Where there are mutual debts between the company and any of its creditors when the company goes into winding-up then those debts will set-off. However a creditor is not entitled to claim the benefit of insolvency set-off if, at the time of giving or receiving credit to or from the company, the creditor had notice of the fact that the company was insolvent. Mutual debts are only capable of being set-off if each party is the beneficial owner of each debt (set-off is not available where the debt is owed to one person as agent for another, or where the debt has been assigned or secured in favour of a third party).

==== Priority of claims ====
Where any of the assets of the company are subject to a valid security interest (not being a floating charge), those claims will normally be enforced against the assets outside of (and in priority to) the liquidation process. The priority of unsecured claims to the assets of the company in a liquidation is regulated by section 556 of the Corporations Act. The rules are very detailed, but broadly they provide that:

1. Properly incurred liquidation expenses are paid out first; followed by
2. If the Court so order, the costs of the winding-up application;
3. Any claims of an administrator to be indemnified;
4. Expenses properly incurred by any "relevant authority" (as defined);
5. Deferred expenses;
6. Wages, superannuation contributions and superannuation guarantee charges;
7. Claims for injury compensation;
8. Amounts due because of an industrial instrument;
9. Retrenchment payments payable to employees; and then
10. Ordinary unsecured creditors.

All ordinary unsecured creditors ranks equally between themselves, and within each rank of preferred creditors, the preferred creditors rank equally.

In the relevant provisions:

- "Deferred expenses" means, broadly, the fees and expenses properly incurred by a relevant authority.
- "Relevant authority" means a liquidator or provisional liquidator, administrator or administrator of a deed of company arrangement.
- "Retrenchment payment" means an amount payable to the employee by virtue of an industrial instrument in respect of the terminationof the employee's employment by the company.
- "Industrial instrument" is defined in section 9 of the statute as (a) a contract of employment; or (b) a law, award, determination or agreement relating to terms or conditions of employment.

== Restructuring options ==
If the company is potentially salvageable with a realistic prospect of surviving its financial difficulties, a company may seek to enter into a non-liquidation arrangement. The two principal types are voluntary administration and deeds of company arrangement. These forms of administration are considered when the debtor company is insolvent or likely to become insolvent. Unlike receivership (which is usually initiated by a secured creditor) these two forms of administration are normally initiated by the company itself.

Voluntary administrations and deeds of company arrangement are regulated under Part 5.3A of the Corporations Act. The purpose is to provide for the business, property and affairs of an insolvent company to be administered in a way that:

1. maximises the chances of the company, or as much as possible of its business, continuing in existence; or
2. if it is not possible for the company or business to survive as a going concern, would result in a better return for the company's creditors and members than would result from an immediate winding up of the company.

=== Voluntary administration ===
Voluntary administration commences from the time when an administrator is appointed, and usually ends either upon the execution by the company of a deed of company arrangement or a resolution by the creditors that the company should be wound up.

An administrator may be appointed by:

- the company;
- a liquidator or provisional liquidator; or
- a chargee of the whole, or substantially the whole, of the company's property where the company is not already being wound up.

Upon their appointment an administrator is obliged to lodge a notice of appointment with ASIC in order to provide notification that the company is under external administration. The administrator must also publish a notice of appointment in a newspaper. Once an administrator is appointed, any use of the company's name must be followed by the words "(Administrator Appointed)".

Where the company is to survive as a going concern the aim of the voluntary administration process is the entering into of a deed of company arrangement. If a deed of company arrangement is executed it will lead to another administration, governed by the terms of the deed of company arrangement. Although both administrations are dealt with under the same part of the statute, the two are actually separate processes.

==== The administrator ====
An administrator must be a registered liquidator who gives consent in writing to accept their appointment. Various persons are disqualified from acting as a company's administrator, including creditors with an interest in the company over $5000, a director, secretary or employee of the company, a director, secretary or employee of a company that is a mortgagee to the company's property, or an auditor of the company.

The core role of the administrator is outlined in the legislation. Whilst a company is under administration, the administrator:

1. has control of the company's business, property and affairs; and
2. may carry on that business and manage that property and those affairs; and
3. may terminate or dispose of all or part of that business, and may dispose of any of that property; and
4. may perform any function, and exercise any powers, that the company or any of its officers could perform or exercise if the company were not under administration.

The administrator is also required to investigate the affairs of the company and consider any possible causes of action and report to creditors. As soon as practicable after the administration of a company begins, the administrator must:

1. investigate the company's business, property, affairs and financial circumstances; and
2. form an opinion about each of the following matters:
  1. whether it would be in the interests of the company's creditors for the company to execute a deed of company arrangement;
  2. whether it would be in the creditors' interests for the administration to end;
  3. whether it would be in the creditors' interests for the company to be wound up.

In carrying out these tasks the administrator acts as agent of the company. As such, the administrator has broad powers to deal with the company's property and carry on the company's business. The administrator is also entitled to the company's books and the officers of the company have an obligation to hand over any books in their possession. The directors are also required to provide the administrator with a statement about the company's business, property, affairs and financial circumstances within one week of the administrator being appointed, and must assist the administrator whenever reasonably required.

==== Effect of voluntary administration ====
The principal effects of voluntary administration are:

- the company's business, property and affairs come under the control of the administrator:
- the company's officers lose the right to use their authority and can only exercise that authority with the written approval of the administrator;
- the appointment of an administrator leads to a statutory moratorium meaning that legal proceedings, winding-up proceedings and execution against company property cannot be commenced or continued by creditors without written consent of the administrator or leave of the Court;
- the retention of the company's employees is ultimately within the administrator's discretion, and the administrator may terminate employees without incurring any personal liability;
- contracts with a company under administration are not automatically terminated - the appointment of an administrator does not reflect an intention on the part of the company to repudiate contracts already entered into, nor does it necessarily constitute a breach or repudiation of a continuing contract. This will however, depend upon the terms of the particular contract. Unlike a liquidator, an administrator does not have any statutory power to disclaim onerous contracts;
- while the company is in administration, the owner or lessor of property that is used or occupied by, or is in the possession of, the company cannot take possession of that property or otherwise recover it - except where a supplier of perishable property is entitled to recover those goods under section 441G or where the owner/lessor can obtain the administrator's written consent or the leave of the Court under;
- creditors who have supplied goods to a company pursuant to a contract which includes a retention of title clause, and the company then goes into administration, are often unable to recover the goods because of the restriction of section 440C provided the company is using the goods;
- where property is being used or occupied by the company in administration, but belongs to someone else, the administrator is only able to dispose of it in the ordinary course of business with the consent of the owner or with leave of the Court:
  - creditors are required to obtain leave of the Court to enforce guarantees against directors, their spouses, de facto spouses or their relatives; and
  - during the period of administration, the administrator controls all financial and other dealings of the company.

If the administrator, in good faith, makes a payment or enters into a transaction, that act is valid and effectual for the purposes of the Corporations Act and cannot be set aside in a subsequent winding up of the company.

=== Deeds of company arrangement ===
A deed of company arrangement is also a type of administration. However, unlike a scheme of arrangement it is not a standalone process. A deed of company arrangement is broadly a compromise agreement entered into between the company and its creditors that follows on from a voluntary administration, much like a company voluntary arrangement.

Where a deed of company arrangement is agreed to by creditors, it will normally result in a successful financial restructuring of the company. Alternatively, less commonly, the deed of company arrangement sometimes simply operates as a way to maximise the benefits of the creditors over the short term. During the operation of the deed of company arrangement a company normally continues to trade, however any debts incurred after the execution of the deed of company arrangement are not covered by the deed, and are treated as expenses of the administration process.

An administrator of the deed of company arrangement must be appointed, and this will usually be the former administrator from the voluntary administration continuing in office. The Corporations Act permits a great deal flexibility in relation to the deed of company arrangement. The deed of company arrangement may involve a simple moratorium for a fixed period, or a composition of creditors' claims whereby creditors agree to accept a cram down, or a plan to pay creditors in deferred instalments, or some combination of these things.

==== Advantages ====
The main aim of a deed of company arrangement is to try and produce a better outcome for all parties than would result upon a liquidation. There are a number of advantages which can potentially arise from a consensual deed of company arrangement. The principal advantage for the company is normally that it can continue to trade during the deed of company arrangement period and may be able to survive its financial difficulties. In addition, for the company and its directors:

- the officers will not be seen as officers of a company that is in liquidation;
- creditors of the company will no longer place pressure for payment on the company;
- because the company is not in liquidation, insolvent trading claims against the directors cannot be commenced;
- the company may be able to carry forward tax benefits as deductions against any future earnings; and
- the company may redevelop its business during the deed of company arrangement period.

The primary benefit for the company's creditors is that there is a potential for a better dividend than what the creditors would otherwise receive if the company were to be broken up and wound-up by a liquidator. Other potential advantages of a deed of company arrangement for the company's creditors are:

- a dividend under a deed of company arrangement may be received more quickly than if the company was being wound up, and third parties may be willing to contribute funds to the company which would not otherwise be available;
- the directors, related companies and some creditors may be willing to defer or waive their claims under a deed of company arrangement, increasing the funds available to the deed of company arrangement creditors;
- the creditors of a company may elect to retain the company as a customer;
- deed of company arrangement administrators can be selected based on relevant industry experience; and
- the administrator of a deed of company arrangement will not have the power to seek recovery with respect to voidable transactions.

==== Effect of a deed of company arrangement ====
Once a deed of company arrangement is executed, the administration of the company ends and the moratorium restrictions that apply to creditors come to an end and are replaced by the deed of company arrangement's moratorium provisions.

The deed of company arrangement binds the deed administrator, the company and its officers and the members of the company and releases the company from its debts to the extent provided by the deed of company arrangement. If a creditor fails to lodge a proof of debt in the administration of a deed of company arrangement, that creditor may be prevented from participating in any distribution of the fund created by deed of company arrangement.

The company is bound by the terms of the deed of company arrangement throughout the term of its operation. The company will also be required to change all public documents by inserting the words "(Subject To A Deed Of Company Arrangement)" after its name. In exceptional circumstances the Court may order that this requirement may be dispensed with.

When the voluntary administration of the company ends and the deed of company arrangement comes into effect, and the powers of the directors are resurrected. However, the deed of company arrangement binds the directors of the company. The deed of company arrangement also binds all creditors in so far as they possess any claims arising before the effective date referred to in the deed of company arrangement. Creditor's claims are normally compromised to some degree under the terms of a deed of company arrangement in order to preserve the company as a going concern. Accordingly, a creditor who is bound by a deed of company arrangement will be unable to subsequently apply for a winding-up order against the company in respect of those claims.

Secured creditors can continue to deal with their own security and are generally not bound by the terms of a deed of company arrangement unless they have expressly consented to it.

== Avoidance of transactions ==
The liquidator of a company may in some cases seek to claw back the benefit of transactions which the company undertook during the "twilight period" prior to the commencement of the winding-up. These are generally referred to as "voidable transactions". The aim of the division is to protect "the interests of unsecured creditors which might otherwise be prejudiced by a company disposing of assets or incurring liabilities or entering into unrealistic loans shortly before winding up".

There are several different types of voidable transactions:

- Unfair preferences
- Uncommercial transactions;
- Fraudulent transactions;
- Unfair loans; and
- Unreasonable director-related transactions.

Unfair preferences and uncommercial transactions are collectively referred to as "insolvent transactions" because of the requirement that the company must have been insolvent and the time they were entered into, or caused the company to become insolvent.

Overview of voidable transactions
Type	Insolvency requirement?	Vulnerability period	Description	Statutory provision
Unfair preference	Yes	6 months, or 4 years for connected persons	Where a creditor received more than it would have done in a winding-up	s.588FA
Uncommercial transactions	Yes	2 years, or 4 years for connected persons	Where a reasonable person would not have entered into the transaction taking into account the relative benefits and detriments	s.588FB
Fraudulent transactions	No	10 years	Transactions entered into by the company for the purpose of defeating, delaying or interfering with the rights of creditors	s.588FE(5)
Unfair loans	No	Any time	Where a loan was subject to interest or other charges that are extortionate	s.588FD
Unreasonable director-related transactions	No	4 years	A payment or transfer from the company to a director or associate that a reasonable person in those circumstances would not have made	s.588FDA

=== Insolvent transactions ===
Insolvent transactions are transactions entered into by a company whilst insolvent, or transactions entered into by the company the result of which caused the company to become insolvent. An insolvent transaction may be voidable when one of the following conditions apply:

1. It was entered into during the 6-month period immediately before the relation back day or during the period between the relation back day and the winding up;
2. it was an uncommercial transaction entered into during 2 years prior to relation back day;
3. it was a related entity transaction during the 4-year period prior to the relation back day;
4. it involved a situation where the company was a party to an unfair preference or uncommercial transaction in order to defeat, delay or interfere with the rights of any or all of its creditors and the transaction was entered into during the ten years immediately prior to the relation back day.

There are two categories of insolvent transactions: unfair preferences, and uncommercial transactions.

==== Unfair preference ====
A transaction is an unfair preference if the company and the creditor are parties to the transaction and the transaction results in the creditor receiving from the company, in relation to an unsecured debt owed to the creditor, a greater amount than it would have received in relation to the debt in a winding up of the company. The liquidator will be required to prove the various elements in order to retrieve the monies paid out by the company. These include that:

1. there was a transaction between the company and a creditor;
2. the transaction was an insolvent transaction (that is the company was insolvent at the time of the transaction or the transaction caused the company to become insolvent);
3. the transaction occurred within six months of the relation back date or within four years of the relation back date if the transaction is with a related entity; and
4. the creditor received more than it would have in a winding-up of the company.

If a transaction is held to constitute an unfair preference, the recipient will be required to repay the benefit received from the company to the liquidator for general distribution to all creditors.

==== Uncommercial transactions ====
An uncommercial transaction is an insolvent transaction (that is the company was insolvent at the time of the transaction or the transaction caused the company to become insolvent) that a reasonable person in the place of the company would not have entered into, taking into account:

- the relevant benefits and the detriments to the company; and
- the respective benefits to the other parties involved and any other relevant matter.

It is not necessary for the liquidator to demonstrate that the transaction was between the company and a creditor. The transaction can be between the company and any party. An uncommercial transaction can be voided if it was entered into during the 2 years prior to the relation-back day, or 4 years prior to the relation-back day if a related entity is a party to the transaction.

==== Fraudulent transactions ====
Where it is not possible to categorise transactions as unfair preferences or uncommercial transactions, they may still be voidable even if entered into outside of the time periods usually applied to such transactions. This will be the case where transactions were entered into by the company for the purpose of defeating, delaying or interfering with the rights of creditors during the 10 years prior to the relation back day.

=== Unfair loans ===
A liquidator may seek to avoid an unfair loan where the loan or loans were subject to interest or charges that are extortionate. In determining whether a loan is unfair, the Court will look at such things as the risk assumed by the company in lending, the value of any security in respect of the loan and the term of the loan. The unfair loan provisions do not require that the transaction be an insolvent transaction.

=== Unreasonable director-related transactions ===
A liquidator may seek to reclaim unreasonable payments made by companies to directors prior to liquidation, for example, by way of an excessive bonus. This provision extends to payments made to "close associates" of any director, conveyances, transfers, other dispositions of property, the issue of securities, and the incurring of an obligation to enter into these obligations.

A transaction will be deemed an unreasonable director-related transaction if a reasonable person in the company's circumstances would not have entered into the transaction. Andrew Vosko was the founding father of unreasonable director-related transactions within the Australian insolvency industry and has successfully recovered numerous claims against directors across his 14 year span within the industry.

=== Defences ===
The Court may not make an order against a party where it would materially prejudice a right or interest of a person who is able to bring themselves within the protective provision. Where the person defending the liquidator's claim was not a party to the voidable transaction, the protective provision requires that they must prove that they did not receive a benefit as a result of the transaction, or if a benefit was received, that it was received in good faith and at the time there was no reasonable grounds for suspecting company insolvent. But if the person defending the liquidator's claim was a party to the voidable transaction then they must prove:

1. that they became a party to the transaction in good faith;
2. that at the time they became a party to the transaction, they had no reasonable grounds for suspecting that the company was insolvent at that time or would become insolvent;
3. that a reasonable person in the recipient's circumstances would have had no such grounds for so suspecting; and
4. that valuable consideration was provided or that they changed their position in reliance on the transaction.

== Director liability ==
The liquidator also has a duty to investigate the company's officers and to determine whether there may be any liability for anything done by them prior to the company going into liquidation. Where the directors or officers have been guilty of either insolvent trading or misfeasance, this may provide the basis for financial claims against them, which the liquidator can use to swell the assets available for distribution to the creditors.

The Corporations Act codifies several duties into sections 180 to 183 of the statute.

Statutory director's duties
Type	Description	Statutory provision
Care and diligence	Subject to the business judgment rule, a director or other officer must exercise their powers and discharge their duties with the degree of care and diligence that a reasonable person would exercise if they (a) were a director or officer of a corporation in the corporation's circumstances; and (b) were in the same position as the director or officer.	s.180
Good faith	A director or other officer must exercise their powers and discharge their duties (a) in good faith in the best interests of the corporation; and (b) for a proper purpose.	s.181
Use of position	A director, secretary, other officer or employee of a corporation must not improperly use their position to (a) gain an advantage for themselves or someone else; or (b) cause detriment to the company.	s.182
Use of information	A person who obtains information in their position as a director or other officer or employee must not improperly use the information to (a) gain an advantage for themselves or someone else; or (b) cause detriment to the corporation.	s.183

=== Insolvent trading ===
A director of an insolvent company may be personally liable for insolvent trading if:

1. he or she was director of the company at the time when the company incurred a debt;
2. the company was insolvent at the time when the debt was incurred, or became insolvent as a result of the incurring of the debt;
3. there were reasonable grounds for believing that the company was insolvent or would become insolvent; and
4. a reasonable person in the position of a director in the company's circumstances would have been aware of the company's insolvency.

In addition to insolvent trading liability, directors of Australian companies may also become personally liable for certain unpaid tax obligations under the director penalty notice regime administered by the Australian Taxation Office; Dissolve is an Australian advisory firm that provides information on director penalty notices and related insolvency matters.

If a director is found to be in breach, then they may also be subject to a civil penalty application by ASIC. ASIC may also seek compensation orders on behalf of the creditors in addition to the liquidator.

=== Common law duties ===
The breach of common law directors' duties may enable a liquidator to recover property from a director, or may give the liquidator a right to an account of profits. If a director removes or misuses company property, this would ordinarily be a breach of their duty of good faith, and may render the transaction voidable. Accordingly, the liquidator may attempt to recover the property from the director, who is deemed to hold it on constructive trust for the company. A director who breaches the duty to use reasonable care and diligence may also be liable for damages if the company suffered loss as a result of the breach.

=== Civil penalties ===
A person who contravenes duties set out in sections 180-183 of the Corporations Act may also be made subject to a civil penalty order of up to A$200,000 upon the application of ASIC. The success rate of ASIC when seeking civil penalties is extremely high. The director may be ordered to pay compensation to the company in addition if the Court is satisfied that the corporation has suffered some loss as a result of the director's breach.

=== Criminal liability ===
Officers of a company who breach sections 180-183 of the Corporations Act may also be criminally liable if:

1. there is recklessness or intentional dishonesty and powers are not exercised in good faith in the best interests of the company;
2. there is, in the use of directors' position, an element of dishonesty and either intention or recklessness in obtaining a gain or causing the company a detriment; or
3. directors use the information that they receive dishonestly with either the intention of gaining an advantage or causing the company to suffer a detriment, or acting recklessly as to whether they might gain an advantage or cause the company a detriment.
