= Administration (law) =

Rescue mechanism for insolvent entities

As a legal concept, administration is a procedure under the insolvency laws of a number of common law jurisdictions, similar to receivership or bankruptcy in the United States. It functions as a rescue mechanism for insolvent entities and allows them to carry on running their business. The process – in the United Kingdom colloquially called being "under administration" – is an alternative to liquidation or may be a precursor to it. Administration is commenced by an administration order.

A company in administrative receivership is operated by an administrator (sometimes referred to as a receiver and manager) (as interim chief executive with custodial responsibility for the company's assets and obligations) on behalf of its creditors. The administrator may recapitalize the business, sell the business to new owners, or demerge it into elements that can be sold and close the remainder.

Most countries distinguish between voluntary (board-decided) and involuntary (court-decided) receivership. In voluntary administrative receivership, the administrator is appointed by the company directors. In involuntary administrative receivership, the administrator is appointed by a judicial court. The legal terms for these processes vary from country to country, and the processes may overlap.

== Australia ==
In Australia, an external administrator, also called an insolvency practitioner, is an independent person that is formally appointed to control an insolvent company's affairs. External administrators can be appointed either by the company's directors, a secured creditor, or by a court, and include: provisional liquidators, liquidators, voluntary administrators, deed administrators, controllers, and receivers. A receivership is when an external administrator known as a "receiver" (usually a "receiver and manager" if it requires controlling the company) is appointed by a secured creditor to sell off a company's assets in order to repay the secured debt, or by the court to protect the company's assets or carry out other tasks.

Voluntary administration is when the directors of an insolvent company appoint an external administrator to investigate whether winding up the corporation can be prevented or delayed and to make recommendations to the directors and their creditors as to whether the company should enter into a deed of company arrangement, be wound up (i.e. liquidated), or be returned to the control of the directors. After an administrator is appointed, there are two meetings of creditors, held within tight time-frames, with the second being the most important as it will decide whether to enter into a deed of company arrangement (DOCA), end the administration or wind the company up. The DOCA is a binding agreement between a business and its creditors overseen by a deed administrator relating to how the company's assets will be managed to ensure better returns for its creditors than an immediate winding up.

When a creditor petitions the court seeking a court liquidation (a court-mandated winding up) of an insolvent company, the court appoints a "provisional liquidator" to temporarily preserve the company's assets while the winding-up application is pending. Administrators are required to be registered liquidators since they have broad powers to deal with company property. The appointment of an administrator "freezes" any legal proceedings against the company and control of the company is given entirely to the administrator. Directors of the company are prohibited from acting in their capacity as directors for the duration of the administration, while administrators are personally liable for any debts incurred by the company in the course of the administration.

== Canada ==
The Bankruptcy and Insolvency Act provides mechanisms for consumer and general proposals in order to give time for an insolvent person to be able to reorganize his affairs. For insolvent companies (or affiliated groups) owing more than CA$5 million, a more flexible regime is available under the Companies' Creditors Arrangement Act ("CCAA").

== United Kingdom ==
In UK law, the administration regime is governed by the Insolvency Act 1986, as amended by the Enterprise Act 2002. An "administrator" can be appointed without petitioning the court by the holder of a floating charge (created since 15 September 2003), by the company or by its directors. Other creditors must petition the court to appoint an administrator. The administrator must act in the interests of all the creditors and attempt to rescue the company as a going concern. If this proves impossible the administrator must work to maximise the recovery of the creditors as a whole. Only then may the administrator attempt to realise property in favour of one or more secured creditors. A firm is usually in administration for no more than 12 months, after which an extension from the court can be produced at the courts discretion. Administration is analogous to going into "Chapter 11" in the United States, although there are certain key differences, mainly stemming from the fact that English law does not include the debtor in possession concept. During the reorganisation period, as a result, the administrator usually runs the business rather than the directors, and any additional liquidity requirements effectively have to be met by funds provided by existing creditors rather than by any super-senior 'DIP financing'.

The administrator is an officer of the court and an agent of the company, and is not personally liable for any contracts they make on behalf of the company. They have the power to do anything necessary or expedient for the management of the affairs, business and property of the company. The new administration regime introduced by the Enterprise Act 2002 replaces the previous situation where administrative receivership was available as an alternative to administration, which has traditionally been a more rescue-oriented insolvency regime. This regime allowed the holder of a floating charge to appoint an administrative receiver to realise assets in his favour, and also to block an administration order sought by a borrower. This was felt to be too favourable to the floating charge holder at the expense of other creditors. Holders of a floating charge created prior to 15 September 2003 retain their right to appoint an administrative receiver, but all purported rights to do so created after that date will be construed as rights to appoint an administrator, subject to certain specific, rare exceptions. A court order is issued that forbids any form of legal or insolvency action without the court's permission. An application to the court for an administration order may be made by the company, the directors, a creditor or any combination of them. The Enterprise Act 2002 amended the Insolvency Act 1986 to provide an out-of-court process to appoint an administrator to the holder of a floating charge or the company or its directors. This is considerably cheaper and simpler than the previous system, which involved an application to court.

=== Administration order ===
In the United Kingdom, an administration order is a process designed to protect limited companies from their creditors while a debt restructuring plan is carried out and presented to creditors and courts. This administration order process requires a licensed insolvency practitioner to act as the administrator appointed by the court. The administration order does not concern joint debt.

=== Pre-pack administration ===
Pre pack is an insolvency procedure where a company arranges a deal to sell its assets to a buyer before appointing administrators to facilitate the sale. It is a legal way of selling the business on to a trade buyer or third party.

A pre-pack is the process of selling the assets of a company immediately after it has entered administration. It is sometimes the case that the previous directors or management purchase the assets of the company from the administrator and set up a new company. This process has advantages in that it enables the administrator to realise a greater amount for the assets due to business continuity and that the goodwill of the company is preserved. The employees of the company are also usually transferred to the new company, preserving jobs. Pre-packs have attracted criticism because of the appearance it gives to unconnected parties that the company has just continued without its creditors. SIP 16 was introduced in January 2009 to assist Insolvency Practitioners in pre-pack cases. It was designed to make the process more transparent for creditors, and to ensure that fair value was obtained for the assets.

In November 2009, the Office of Fair Trading announced a study into corporate insolvencies, with particular focus on pre-pack administrations, to report on whether the insolvency market is operating efficiently, with enough freedom of competition between insolvency practitioners and whether consumers and creditors are being treated as fairly as possible. An example of a pre-pack is the sale of the assets of Cobra Beer to Coors immediately after Cobra Beer entered administration. This allowed the brand to continue and saved jobs, but also left suppliers out of pocket by an estimated £75 million.

=== Individual administration order in England, Wales and Northern Ireland ===
In this process, a debtor who has enough money left over after priority creditors and essential expenses may be able to arrange an individual voluntary arrangement. (Debtors with less serious problems may prefer a debt management plan.)

== Republic of Ireland ==
The Republic of Ireland operates a similar process called examinership, but companies require permission from the High Court to enter and leave examinership.

== New Zealand ==
In New Zealand, voluntary administration is covered by the Companies Act 1993, as amended under the Companies (Voluntary Administration) Regulations Bill in 2007.

== Ukraine ==
In Ukraine, a system of "sanation" (Ukrainian: санація) measures take place to prevent or lessen the effect of insolvency. The basic components of those measures include providing special loans and subsidies; exemptions for issuing a credit or taxation; restructuring of the business's debts and capital; change of organizational and production structure of the debtor; full or partial nationalization; others.

Following the dissolution of the Soviet Union and reforming the existing socialist law, in 1999 there was established a law "About restoring the debtor's solvency or declaring him bankrupt".

The official who administers "sanation" is known as an "arbitral director" (Ukrainian: aрбітрaжний керуючий) and is appointed by a court.

== See also ==
- Administration (British football)
- Administrative receivership
- Chapter 11, Title 11, United States Code
- Examinership a similar process in the Republic of Ireland
