= Public limited company =

Publicly traded limited liability company

A public limited company (legally abbreviated to PLC or plc) is a type of public company under United Kingdom company law, some Commonwealth jurisdictions, and Ireland. It is a limited liability company whose shares may be freely sold and traded to the public (although a PLC may also be privately held, often by another PLC), with a minimum share capital of £50,000 and usually with the letters PLC after its name. Similar companies in the United States are called publicly traded companies.

A PLC can be either an unlisted or listed company on the stock exchanges. In the United Kingdom, a public limited company usually must include the words "public limited company" or the abbreviation "PLC" or "plc" at the end and as part of the legal company name. Welsh companies may instead choose to end their names with ccc, an abbreviation for cwmni cyfyngedig cyhoeddus. However, some public limited companies (mostly nationalised concerns) incorporated under special legislation are exempted from bearing any of the identifying suffixes. The term "public limited company" and the "PLC"/"plc" suffix were introduced in 1981; prior to this, all limited companies bore the suffix "Limited" ("Ltd"), which is still used by private limited companies.

== Registration ==
When a new company incorporates in England and Wales or in Scotland, it must register with Companies House, an executive agency of the Department for Business and Trade. Prior to October 2009, companies in Northern Ireland were registered with the Northern Ireland Executive's Department of Enterprise, Trade and Investment, but since then Northern Irish company registrations, as with those of the rest of the United Kingdom, have been handled by Companies House.

== Company directors ==
Formation of a public limited company requires a minimum of two directors and one secretary (differing from country to country: in India three directors are required). In general terms anyone can be a company director, provided they are not disqualified on one of the following grounds:

- in the case of PLCs or their subsidiaries, the person is over 70 years of age or reaches 70 years of age while in office, unless they are appointed or re-appointed by resolution of the company in general meeting of which special notice has been given.
- the person is an undischarged insolvent, subject to a Bankruptcy Restrictions Order (BRO) or Bankruptcy Restrictions Undertaking (BRU) or otherwise disqualified by a Court from holding a directorship, unless given leave to act in respect of a particular company or companies.
- in England and Wales (as of October 2008; Companies Act 2006) and in Scotland (Age of Legal Capacity (Scotland) Act 1991), the person is under 16 years old.

== Share capital ==
The members must agree to take some, or all, of the shares when the company is registered. The memorandum of association must show the names of the people who have agreed to take shares and the number of shares each will take. These people are called the subscribers.

There is a minimum share capital for public limited companies: before it can start business, it must have allotted shares to the value of at least £50,000. A quarter of them, £12,500, must be paid up. Each allotted share must be paid up to at least one quarter of its nominal value together with the whole of any premium.

A company can increase its authorised share capital by passing an ordinary resolution (unless its articles of association require a special or extraordinary resolution). A copy of the resolution – and notice of the increase on Form 123 – must reach Companies House within 15 days of being passed. No fee is payable to Companies House.

A company can decrease its authorised share capital by passing an ordinary resolution to cancel shares which have not been taken or agreed to be taken by any person. Notice of the cancellation, on Form 122, must reach Companies House within one month. No fee is payable to Companies House.

=== Share types ===
A company may have as many different types of shares as it wishes, all with different conditions attached to them. Generally, share types are divided into the following categories:

- Ordinary – As the name suggests these are the ordinary shares of the company with no special rights or restrictions. They may be divided into classes of different value.
- Preference – These shares normally carry a right that any annual dividends available for distribution will be paid preferentially on these shares before other classes.
- Cumulative preference – These shares carry a right that, if the dividend cannot be paid in one year, it will be carried forward to successive years.
- Redeemable – These shares are issued with an agreement that the company will buy them back at the option of the company or the shareholder after a certain period, or on a fixed date. A company cannot have redeemable shares only.

Bearer shares are no longer possible, as they were abolished in the UK by the Small Business, Enterprise and Employment Act 2015. Any existing bearer shares had to be converted to registered shares before February 2016, or face cancellation.

A PLC has access to capital markets and can offer its shares for sale to the public through a recognised stock exchange. It can also issue advertisements offering any of its securities for sale to the public. In contrast, a private company may not offer to the public any shares in itself.

=== Company formation ===
==== Paper process ====
The following documents, together with the registration fee are sent to the Registrar of Companies:

Memorandum of association
This sets out the company name, the registered office address and the company objects. The object of a company may simply be to carry on business as a general commercial company. The company's memorandum delivered to the Registrar must be signed by each subscriber in front of a witness who must attest the signature. It is often referred to as the 'charter of a company' or 'constitution of the company'. The signatories to the memorandum of association are deemed to be the first directors of the company. The memorandum defines the relation of members with the rest of the world.
Articles of association
This is the document which sets out the rules for the running of the company's internal affairs. The company's articles delivered to the Registrar must be signed by each subscriber in front of a witness who must attest to the signature. The articles define the inter-management, inter-member and inter-employee relationship.
Form 1
This gives details of the first directors, secretary and the intended address of the registered office. As well as their names and addresses, the company's directors must give their date of birth, occupation and details of other directorships they have held within the last five years. Each officer appointed and each subscriber (or their agent) must sign and date the form.
Form 12
This is a statutory declaration of compliance with all the legal requirements relating to the incorporation of a company. It must be signed by a solicitor who is forming the company, or by one of the people named as a director or company secretary on Form 10. It must be signed in the presence of a commissioner for oaths, a notary public, a justice of the peace or a solicitor. There is usually a £5 fee payable to the person that witnesses the statuary declaration.

==== Electronic process ====
The key difference with the paper process is that there is no Form 12 and requirement for a statutory declaration. This significantly speeds the process: the record at Companies House for the formation of an Electronic Company is 23 minutes.

Because the electronic process requires compatible software that works with Companies House eFiling service, companies are usually formed through a Company Formation Agent.

=== Annual returns ===
Every company must deliver an annual return to Companies House at least once every twelve months. It has 28 days from the date to which the return is made up to do this. Failure to file a return is a criminal offence, for which the officers of the company may be fined.

There is an annual document-processing fee of £110 if filed by paper (or £50 for users of the Electronic Filing or WebFilings services), which must be sent to Companies House with the annual return.

== Conversion ==
=== Private limited company to a public limited company ===
Both a private company limited by shares and an unlimited company with a share capital may re-register as a plc, but a company without a share capital cannot do so.

A private company must pass a special resolution that it be so re-registered and deliver a copy of the resolution together with an application form to the Registrar. The resolution must also:

- alter the company's memorandum so that it states that the company is to be a public limited company,
- increase its share capital to the statutory minimum of £50,000,
- make any other alterations to the memorandum so that it conforms to that required for a public limited company,
- make any required alterations to the articles of association of the company.

If it does not already have sufficient share capital, the company must issue £50,000 in shares a minimum of 25% part paid.

== See also ==
- European Company Statute
- Limited liability company
- Limited liability partnership
- Private limited company
- Public company
- S.A. (corporation)
- United Kingdom company law
- Unlimited company
- Virtual business
