= Joint venture =

Type of business entity

A joint venture (JV) is formed when two or more distinct firms combine a portion of their resources to form a separate, jointly-owned entity. Joint ventures differ from mergers and acquisitions. Companies may pursue joint ventures for multiple reasons: to access a new market, particularly an emerging market; to gain scale efficiencies by combining assets and operations; to share risk for major investments or projects; or to access skills and capabilities. In several countries, infrastructure development is carried out jointly by the government and private businesses through public-private partnerships, often as joint ventures.

Most joint ventures are incorporated, although some, as in the oil and gas industry, are "unincorporated" joint ventures that mimic a corporate entity. For individuals, when two or more persons come together to form a temporary partnership to carry out a particular project, such a partnership is also called a joint venture, in which the parties are co-venturers.

A joint venture can take various forms, depending on the intention of the co-venturing firms or individuals. It can also take the form of a project or asset JV created to pursue a specific project, as an "industry utility" that provides a narrow set of services to industry participants, or as an organization for defining industry standards.

== Terminology ==
In European law, the term "joint venture" is an exclusive legal concept, better defined under the rules of company law. In France, the term "joint venture" is variously translated as "association d'entreprises", "entreprise conjointe", "coentreprise" or "entreprise commune".

== Process ==
A joint venture can be formed in the following major ways:

- A foreign investor buying an interest in a local company
- A local firm acquiring an interest in an existing foreign firm
- Both foreign and local entrepreneurs jointly forming a new enterprise
- All of the above, together with public capital and/or bank debt

== Formation ==
In the UK, India, and in many common law countries, a joint venture (or else a company formed by a group of individuals) must file its memorandum of association with the appropriate authority. This is a statutory document that informs the public of its existence. It may be viewed by the public at the office in which it is filed. Together with the articles of association, it forms the "constitution" of a company in these countries.

The articles of association regulate the interaction between shareholders and the directors of a company and can be a lengthy document of up to 700,000 or so pages. It deals with the powers delegated by the stockholders to the directors and those withheld by them, requiring the passing of ordinary resolutions, special resolutions and the holding of Extraordinary General Meetings to bring the directors' decision to bear.

By its formation, the JV becomes a new entity with the implications that:

- it is officially separate from its founders, who might otherwise be giant corporations, even amongst the emerging countries
- it has separate legal liability from that of its founders, except for invested capital
- the JV can contract in its own name, acquire rights (such as the right to buy new companies)
- it can sue (and be sued) in courts in defense or the pursuance of its objectives.

=== Shareholders' agreement ===
The agreement between the members of a joint venture may be called a Memorandum of Understanding. It is created in association with other activities necessary to form the JV.

Some of the issues that may be addressed by members of a JV in a shareholders' agreement are:

- Valuation of intellectual rights, say, the valuations of the IPR of one partner and, say, the real estate of the other
- The control of the company either by the number of directors or its "funding"
- The number of directors and the rights of the founders to appoint directors which shows whether a shareholder dominates or shares equally.
- Management decisions – whether the board or the founders manages the JV
- Transferability of shares – assignment rights of the founders to other members of the company
- Dividend policy – percentage of profits to be declared when there is profit
- Winding up – the conditions, notice to members
- Confidentiality of know-how and founders' agreement and penalties for their disclosure
- First right of refusal – purchase rights and counter-bid by a founder

There are many features which have to be incorporated into the shareholders' agreement which is quite private to the parties as they start. Normally, it requires no submission to any authority.

The other basic document which must be filed is the Articles, which is a published document and known to members. This repeats the shareholders' agreement as to the number of directors each founder can appoint to the board of directors; whether the board controls the joint venture or the founders; the percentage of votes (cast by the directors or their alternates/proxies) required to make a decision; the deployment of funds of the firm; the extent of debt permissible; the proportion of profit that can be declared as dividends; and so on. Also significant is what will happen if the firm is dissolved, if one of the partners dies, or if the firm is sold.

Often, JVs are created as 50:50 partnerships with each party having the same number of directors but rotating control over the firm, or rights to appoint the Chairperson and Vice-chair of the company. Sometimes a party may give a separate trusted person a proxy vote to cast in their place at board meetings.

=== Dissolution ===
A JV is not a permanent structure. It can be dissolved when:

- Aims of the original venture are met
- Aims of the original venture are not met
- Either or both parties develop new goals
- Either or both parties no longer agree with the aims of the joint venture
- The agreed duration of the joint venture has expired
- Legal or financial issues
- Evolving market conditions mean that the joint venture is no longer appropriate or relevant
- One party acquires the other

== Risks ==
Joint ventures are risky forms of business partnerships. Literature in business and management has paid attention to different factors of conflict and opportunism in joint ventures, in particular the influence of parent control structure, ownership change, and volatile environment.

== Supplying to governments ==
Government procurement regulations, such as the Federal Acquisition Regulation (FAR) in the United States, may specify how joint ventures are to be approached as suppliers or confirm that a joint venture or other form of contractor partnering is seen as a "desirable" arrangement for supplying to government. The FAR states that;

The Government will recognize the integrity and validity of contractor team arrangements [including joint ventures], provided the arrangements are identified and company relationships are fully disclosed in an offer or, for arrangements entered into after submission of an offer, before the arrangement becomes effective. The Government will not normally require or encourage the dissolution of contractor team arrangements.

Under the rules applicable to public procurement in the European Union, public bodies may insist that suppliers intending to provide goods and services through a joint partnership accept joint liability for the execution of the contract.

== Worldwide ==
=== Australia ===
Joint ventures in Australia fall under several categories:

1. Contractual joint ventures: These ventures are established by a contractual joint venture agreement and create a separate legal entity. These are often used for specific projects or short-term collaborations.
2. Equity-based joint ventures: In this type, the parties create a separate company or entity to fulfil the joint venture activities, with each party becoming a shareholder in the newly created company.
3. Consortium: These are similar to many joint ventures, in the way companies work together and pool resources for projects, though consortium members are only financially responsible for their sector of the project (limited liability).

=== China ===
According to a 2003 report of the United Nations Conference on Trade and Development, China was the recipient of US$53.5 billion in direct foreign investment, making it the world's largest recipient of direct foreign investment, exceeding the US for the first time. Also, it approved the establishment of nearly 500,000 foreign-investment enterprises. The US had 45,000 projects by 2004 with an in-place investment of over 48 billion.

Until recently, no guidelines existed on how foreign investment was to be handled due to the restrictive nature of China toward foreign investors. Following the death of Mao Zedong in 1976, initiatives in foreign trade began to be applied, and law applicable to foreign direct investment was made clear in 1979, while the first Sino-foreign equity venture took place in 2001. The corpus of joint venture law has improved since then.

Companies with foreign partners can carry out manufacturing and sales operations in China and can sell through their own sales network. Foreign-Sino companies have export rights which are not available to wholly Chinese companies, as China desires to import foreign technology by encouraging JVs and the latest technologies.

Under Chinese law, foreign enterprises are divided into several basic categories. Of these, five will be described or mentioned here: three relate to industry and services and two as vehicles for foreign investment. Those five categories of Chinese foreign enterprises are: Sino-foreign equity joint ventures (EJVs), Sino-foreign co-operative joint ventures (CJVs), wholly foreign-owned enterprises (WFOEs), though they are not actually joint ventures and are mentioned only for comparison, foreign investment companies limited by shares (FICLBS), and investment companies through foreign investors (ICFI). Each category is described below.

==== Equity joint ventures ====
An EJV is formed between a Chinese partner and a foreign investor. It is incorporated in both Chinese (official) and in English (with equal validity), with limited liability. Before China entered into the WTO – and thus the existence of WFOEs – EJVs predominated among Chinese joint ventures. In an EJV, the partners share profits, losses, and risk in equal proportion to their respective contributions to the venture's registered capital.

The JV contract and the articles of association are the EJV's two most fundamental legal documents. The Articles mirror many of the provisions of the JV contract. In case of conflict the JV document has precedence. These documents are prepared at the same time as the feasibility report. There are also ancillary documents (termed "offsets" in the US) covering know-how and trademarks and supply-of-equipment agreements.

Minimum levels of equity are prescribed for investments where the foreign equity and debt levels are:

- Less than US$3 million: equity must constitute 70% of the investment
- Between US$3 million and US$10 million: minimum equity must be US$2.1 million and at least 50% of the investment
- Between US$10 million and US$30 million: minimum equity must be US$5 million and at least 40% of the investment
- More than US$30 million: minimum equity must be US$12 million and at least 1/3 of the investment.

The total foreign investment in the project must be at least 25%. No minimum investment is set for the Chinese partner. The timing of investments must be mentioned in the Agreement, and failure to invest at the indicated time draws a penalty.

==== Co-operative joint ventures ====
Co-operative joint ventures (CJVs) are permitted under the law governing joint ventures between Chinese and non-Chinese partners. Co-operative enterprises are also called contractual operative enterprises.

CJVs may have a limited or unlimited structure. The limited-liability version is similar to an EJV – the foreign investor provides the majority of funds and technology and the Chinese party provides land, buildings, equipment, etc. However, there are no minimum limits on the foreign partner, allowing them to be a minority shareholder.

The other format of the CJV is similar to a partnership where the parties jointly incur unlimited liability for the debts of the enterprise with no separate legal personality being created. In both cases, the status of the formed enterprise is that of a legal Chinese person which can hire labor directly as, for example, a Chinese national contractor might. Minimum capital is registered at various levels of investment.

Other differences from the EJV are:

- A co-operative JV does not have to be a legal entity.
- The partners in a CJV are allowed to share profit on an agreed basis, not necessarily in proportion to capital contribution. This proportion also determines the control and the risks of the enterprise in the same proportion.
- It may be possible to operate a CJV in a restricted area.
- A CJV could allow negotiated levels of management and financial control, as well as methods of recourse associated with equipment leases and service contracts. In an EJV management control is through allocation of board seats.
- During the term of the venture, the foreign participant can recover their investment, provided the contract permits it. All fixed assets will become the property of the Chinese participant on termination of the JV.
- Foreign partners can often obtain higher levels of control by negotiating management, voting, and staffing rights into a CJV's articles, since control does not have to be allocated according to equity stakes.

Convenience and flexibility are the main characteristics of this type of investment. It is therefore easier to find co-operative partners and to reach an agreement than with an EJV.

With changes in the law, it has become possible to merge with a Chinese company for a quick start. A foreign investor does not need to set up a new corporation in China. Instead, the investor uses the Chinese partner's business license under a contractual arrangement. However, under the CJV, the land stays in the possession of the Chinese partner.

The percentage of the CJV owned by each partner may also change throughout the JV's life, giving the option to the foreign investor, by holding higher equity, to obtain a faster rate of return with the concurrent wish of the Chinese partner of a later larger role in the operations of the JV and maintaining long-term control.

Parties to an EJV, CJV or WFOE prepare a feasibility study. It is a non-binding document – the parties are still free to choose not to proceed with the project. The feasibility study must cover the fundamental technical and commercial aspects of the project before the parties can proceed to formalize the necessary legal documentation.

==== Wholly foreign-owned enterprises (WFOEs) ====
WFOEs are enterprises solely controlled by foreign investment. China's entry into the World Trade Organization (WTO) around 2001 has had profound effects on foreign investment. Not being a JV, they are considered here for comparison only.

The WFOE is a Chinese legal person and has to obey all Chinese laws. As such, it is allowed to enter into contracts with appropriate government authorities to acquire land use rights, rent buildings, and receive utility services. In this it is more similar to a CJV than an EJV.

WFOEs are expected by the PRC to use the most modern technologies and to export at least 50% of their production, with all of the investment to be wholly provided by the foreign investor(s) and the enterprise to be within their total control.

WFOEs are typically limited liability enterprises as with EJVs, but the liability of the directors, managers, advisers, and suppliers depends on the rules which govern the Departments or Ministries which control product liability, worker safety or environmental protection.

An advantage the WFOE enjoys over its alternatives is protection of its know-how, but a disadvantage is the absence of a Chinese party.

As of the 3rd quarter of 2004, WFOEs had replaced EJVs and CJVs as follows:

Distribution Analysis of JV in Industry – PRC
Type JV	2000	2001	2002	2003	2004 (3Qr)
WFOE	46.9	50.3	60.2	62.4	66.8
EJV,%	35.8	34.7	20.4	29.6	26.9
CJV,%	15.9	12.9	9.6	7.2	5.2
Misc JV*	1.4	2.1	1.8	1.8	1.1
CJVs (No.)**	1735	1589	1595	1547	996

(*)=Financial Ventures by EJVs/CJVs (**)=Approved JVs

==== Foreign investment companies limited by shares (FICLBS) ====
These enterprises are formed under the Sino-Foreign Investment Act. The capital is composed of the value of stock in exchange for the value of the property given to the enterprise. The liability of the shareholders, including debt, is equal to the number of shares purchased by each partner.

The registered capital of the company is a share of the paid-in capital. The minimum amount of the registered capital of the company should be RMB 30 million. These companies can be listed on only two stock exchanges in the PRC – the Shanghai and Shenzhen Stock Exchanges. Shares of two types are permitted on these exchanges – Types "A" and Type "B" shares.

Type A shares are only to be used by Chinese nationals and can be traded only in Renminbi. Type "B" shares are denominated in Renminbi but are traded in foreign currency, and can be traded in foreign exchanges and by Chinese nationals having foreign exchange privileges. Further, state enterprises which have been approved for corporatization can trade "H" shares in Hong Kong and on the New York Stock Exchange.

==== Investment companies by foreign investors (ICFI) ====
ICFIs are established in China by solely foreign-funded businesses or jointly with Chinese partners who engage in direct investment. They must be incorporated as a company with limited liability.

The total amount of the prospective investor's assets during the year preceding the application to do business in China has to be no less than US$400 million within the territory of China. The paid-in capital contribution has to exceed $10 million. Furthermore, more than 3 project proposals for the investor's intended investment projects must have already been approved. The shares subscribed and held by foreign ICFIs should be 25%. The investment firm can be established as an EJV.

On March 15, 2019, China's National People's Congress adopted a unified Foreign Investment Law which came into effect on January 1, 2020.

==== List of prominent joint ventures in China ====
- AMD-Chinese
- Huawei-Symantec
- Shanghai Automotive Industry Corporation (上海汽车集团股份有限公司), also known as SAIC (上汽) and SAIC-GM (上汽通用), is a Chinese state-owned automotive manufacturing company headquartered in Shanghai, operating in a joint venture with US-owned General Motors. Products produced by SAIC joint venture companies are sold under marques including Baojun, Buick, Chevrolet, Iveco, Škoda, and Volkswagen.
  - General Motors with SAIC Motor, formerly known as Shanghai General Motors Company Ltd., makes numerous cars in China in four factories, especially under the Buick marque, but also some Chevrolet and Cadillac models. In November 2018, the company announced new Chevrolet models for the Chinese market, including an extended-wheelbase Malibu XL, a new Chevy SUV concept, and a new Monza.
  - Volkswagen Group China — Numerous VW and Audi cars manufactured in China are made under two joint-venture partnerships: FAW-Volkswagen and SAIC Volkswagen.
- Beijing Benz Automotive Co., Ltd is a joint venture between BAIC Motor and Daimler AG. As of November 22, 2018, a full two million Mercedes-Benz vehicles had been built in China by this alliance.
- Dongfeng Motor Corporation (东风汽车公司, abbreviated to 东风) is a Chinese state-owned automobile manufacturer headquartered in Wuhan. The company was the second-largest Chinese vehicle maker in 2017 by production volume, manufacturing over 4.1 million vehicles that year. Its own brands are Dongfeng, Venucia, and Dongfeng Fengshen. Joint ventures include Cummins, Dana, Honda, Nissan, Infiniti, PSA Peugeot Citroën, Renault, Kia, and Yulon.
- FAW Group Corporation (第一汽车集团, abbreviated to 一汽) is a Chinese state-owned automotive manufacturing company headquartered in Changchun. In 2017, the company ranked third in terms of output making 3.3 million vehicles. FAW sells products under at least ten different brands including its own and Besturn/Bēnténg, Dario, Haima, Hongqi, Jiaxing, Jie Fang, Jilin, Oley, Jie Fang and Yuan Zheng, and Tianjin Xiali. FAW joint ventures sell Audi, General Motors, Mazda, Toyota and Volkswagen.
- GAC (Guangzhou Automobile Group) is a Chinese state-owned automobile manufacturer headquartered in Guangzhou. They were the sixth biggest manufacturer in 2017, manufacturing over 2 million vehicles in 2017. GAC sells passenger cars under the Trumpchi brand. In China, they are more known for their foreign joint ventures with Fiat, Honda, Isuzu, Mitsubishi, and Toyota.
- Chang'an Automobile Group (重庆长安汽车股份有限公司, abbreviated to 长安) is an automobile manufacturer headquartered in Chongqing, and is a state-owned enterprise. In 2017, the company ranked fourth in terms of output, making 2.8 million vehicles in 2017. Changan designs, develops, manufactures and sells passenger cars sold under the Changan brand and commercial vehicles sold under the Chana brand. Foreign joint venture companies include Suzuki, Ford, Mazda and PSA Peugeot Citroën.
- Chery, a Chinese state-owned automobile manufacturer based in Anhui. They were the tenth biggest manufacturer in 2017. They have a foreign joint venture with Jaguar Land Rover for the production of Jaguar and Land Rover cars in China.
- Brilliance Auto is a Chinese state-owned automobile manufacturer based in Shenyang. They were the ninth biggest manufacturer in 2017. They have a foreign joint venture with BMW and also sell passenger vehicles under their own brand Brilliance and are expected to make 520,000 cars in China during 2019.
- Honda Motor Co has a joint venture with Guangzhou Automobile Group (GAC Group)
- Geely-Volvo, or Geely, is the largest privately owned automobile manufacturer and seventh largest manufacturer overall in China. Their flagship brand Geely Auto became the top Chinese car brand in 2017. Currently one of the fastest-growing automotive groups in the world, Geely is known for its ownership of Swedish luxury car brand Volvo. In China, passenger car brands include Geely Auto, Volvo Cars, and Lynk & Co. The entire Volvo Cars company has been owned by the Chinese company Geely since 2010, and Geely manufactures most of the XC60 vehicles in China for export.

=== India ===
JV companies are the preferred form of corporate investment, but there are no separate laws for joint ventures. Companies incorporated in India are at par with domestic companies.

- Two parties (individuals or companies) incorporate a company in India. The business of one party is transferred to the new company, and as consideration for the transfer, the company issues shares that are subscribed by that party. The other party subscribes to the shares in cash.
- Two parties subscribe for shares of a JV company in agreed proportions, in cash, and start a new business.
- The promoter shareholder of an existing Indian company and a third party, who/which may be an individual or a company, one of them non-resident or both residents, collaborate to jointly carry on the business of that company, and its shares are taken by the said third party through payment in cash.

Private companies can invest in joint ventures in India together with public companies, limited or otherwise, and likewise with partnerships. Sole proprietorship firms can also do the same. However, the latter are reserved for non-resident Indians.

Through capital market operations, foreign companies can transact on the Bombay Stock Exchange and the National Stock Exchange of India without prior permission of the Reserve Bank of India through the automatic route. The Reserve Bank of India sets the limit to the amount and percentage of equity which could be owned by investors.

Joint ventures may also be established as wholly owned subsidiaries (WOS), project offices, and branch offices, incorporated in India or not. Sometimes, it is understood that branches are started to test and understand the market. Equity transfer from residents to non-residents in mergers and acquisitions (M&A) is usually permitted under the automatic route. However, if the M&As are in sectors and activities that require prior government permission under the Master Directions issued under the Foreign Exchange Management Act, 1999, the transfer can proceed only after permission.

=== Ukraine ===
In Ukraine, most joint ventures are operated in the form of a limited liability company, as there is no law specifically providing for the establishment of joint ventures. Protection of the rights of foreign investors is guaranteed by the Law of Ukraine called "On Foreign Investment". A JV can be established without the formation of a separate legal entity under a so called Cooperation Agreement. Under the Ukraine civil code, a CA can be established by two or more parties; rights and obligations of the parties are regulated by the agreement. Cooperation Agreements are widely spread in Ukraine, mainly in the field of oil and gas production.

== Public perception ==
According to Gerard Baynham of Water Street Partners, there has been much negative press about joint ventures, but objective data indicate that they may actually outperform wholly owned and controlled affiliates. He writes, "A different narrative emerged from our recent analysis of U.S. Department of Commerce (DOC) data, collected from more than 20,000 entities. According to the DOC data, foreign joint ventures of U.S. companies realized a 5.5 percent average return on assets (ROA), while those companies' wholly owned and controlled affiliates (the vast majority of which are wholly owned) realized a slightly lower 5.2 percent ROA. The same story holds for investments by foreign companies in the U.S., but the difference is more pronounced. U.S.-based joint ventures realized a 2.2 percent average ROA, while wholly owned and controlled affiliates in the U.S. only realized a 0.7 percent ROA."

== See also ==
- Common purpose, also known as a "joint enterprise" (criminal law)
- Division (business)
- International joint venture
- Joint powers authority, a similar concept for government agencies
- Partnership
- Subsidiary
- Consortium
