= Provisional liquidation =

Part of corporate insolvency process

Provisional liquidation is a process which exists as part of the corporate insolvency laws of a number of common law jurisdictions whereby after the lodging of a petition for the winding-up of a company by the court, but before the court hears and determines the petition, the court may appoint a liquidator on a "provisional" basis. (The provisional liquidator is appointed to safeguard the assets of the company and maintain the status quo pending the hearing of the petition.) Unlike a conventional liquidator, a provisional liquidator does not assess claims against the company or try to distribute the company's assets to creditors, as the power to realise the assets comes after the court orders a liquidation.

In practice most instances of applications for a provisional liquidator involve some type of allegation of fraud or other misconduct relating to the company.

== Application ==
Typically, an application for the appointment of a provisional liquidator is made by either:

1. a creditor, where they are concerned that the assets of the company are at risk or might be dissipated or put beyond the reach of creditors during the period before the winding up application is heard;
2. the shareholders, where they are concerned that the directors of the company are acting improperly; or
3. the company itself. This may arise due to a dispute between directors and other officers, or because the company is insolvent and the directors do not want to risk insolvent trading claims in the period before an official liquidator is appointed. In some jurisdictions (but not all) the company may apply to put itself into provisional liquidation to shield itself from creditor claims whilst it tries to implement a restructuring.

The remedy is an exceptional one, and most instances of applications for a provisional liquidator are made because of concerns about some type of material impropriety. In exceptional cases it is also possible for public authorities to apply for the appointment of a provisional liquidator to protect the public interest from fraud or other similar conduct, although this is much less common.

The court invariably has a discretion whether to appoint a provisional liquidator. A court will not normally approve the application unless it is satisfied that there is a strong likelihood that a liquidator will be appointed on the substantive application. But even if the company is likely to go into liquidation, provisional liquidation is still an exceptional interim or "emergency remedy". There need to be special reasons for the appointment of a provisional liquidator in the interim period. Normally this is because the assets must face a high risk of dissipation or there must be some other urgent reason why a liquidator is required for the interim period.

Applications are most likely to be granted in situations where:

- it is necessary to have an independent person investigate the company and its affairs;
- there was an urgent need to act to preserve assets of the company;
- there was a material conflict of interest between a director and the company; or
- there had been an impropriety in the conduct of the company’s affairs.

Conversely, because there needs to be some urgency or risk of dissipation of assets, applications are likely to be refused if:

- the only reason relied on by a creditor was that the company was insolvent (without more);
- an administrative receiver or administrator had already been appointed, negating the risk of dissipation of assets;
- the application was made for an improper purpose, such as to maximise the applicant’s own position;
- the application was made simply to try and permit the company to continue to trade where the company is insolvency and clearly should be wound up; or
- there was a genuine dispute as to the creditor’s debt.

Given their nature, applications for provisional liquidation are often made urgently and without giving notice to the company or its directors. Where the application is made without notice:

1. the applicant is under a duty to give "full and frank disclosure" to the court of all material facts (including any facts which are adverse to the applicant); and
2. the applicant will normally have to give an undertaking in damages to compensate the company for any loss caused if it subsequently transpires after a full hearing that the order should not have been.

== Effect ==
If the court makes the order then a provisional liquidator is appointed over the company, and the control of all assets of the company, and the conduct of any business and other affairs of the company are transferred to the provisional liquidator. The directors cease to have any authority. In almost all jurisdictions, the provisional liquidator will normally have to be a licensed insolvency practitioner.

The provisional liquidator will generally only have the powers and functions conferred upon him or her by the order of the court. It is not normally part of the role of a provisional liquidator to collect and sell the assets of the company or otherwise take steps in relation to the actual winding up the company. The principal reason for the appointment is the preservation of the company's property.

One of the common functions of a provisional liquidator is to investigate whether the company's property has been misappropriated or its business has been wrongfully conducted. But generally speaking a provisional liquidator will not have power to bring proceedings on behalf of the company for wrongful trading, or to challenge transactions as undervalue transactions or unfair preferences.

== Termination ==
Provisional liquidation will normally come to an end in one of three ways:

1. a full winding up order is made;
2. an order of the court is made discharging the provisional liquidation (normally at an inter partes hearing to challenge the original appointment); or
3. the winding up petition itself is dismissed.

== Specific jurisdictions ==
The effect of provisional liquidation varies from jurisdiction to the jurisdiction.

=== Australia ===
In Australia provisional liquidation is regulated by section 472(2) of Corporations Act 2001. In Australia provisional liquidators must be licensed insolvency practitioners.

=== British Virgin Islands ===
Under British Virgin Islands law provisional liquidation is regulated by section 170(4) of the Insolvency Act 2003. In Akai Holdings Limited v Brinlow Investments Limited it was held that an applicant would need to show four things:

1. a petition before the court for the appointment of a liquidator;
2. a good arguable case that a ground for the appointment of a liquidator exists;
3. a good arguable case that the applicant has the necessary standing; and
4. that the court should exercise its discretion to maintain the status quo in relation to the company’s assets.

=== Canada ===
In Canada provision liquidation is regulated under section 28 of the Winding-up and Restructuring Act (R.S.C., 1985, c. W-11).

=== Cayman Islands ===
In the Cayman Islands, provisional liquidation is principally regulated by section 104(3) of the Companies Law (2013) Revision. One unusual feature of provisional liquidation in Cayman is that it is possible to appoint a provisional liquidator and still allow the directors to retain their powers of management. This in part facilitates a slightly unusual use of provisional liquidation in the Cayman Islands as part of a debtor in possession corporate rehabilitation process. The company itself will apply for an order for provisional liquidation, and provisional liquidators are appointed which effectively creates a stay on the claims of unsecured creditors. The board of directors can then use that "breathing space" to try and implement a restructuring of the company's debts pursuant to a scheme of arrangement, or pursuant to an international restructuring process in the courts of another jurisdictions. This approach has not been rejected in the courts of other jurisdictions (such as Hong Kong), but accepted in others.

=== Hong Kong ===
In Hong Kong, there are three types of provisional liquidators. There are "traditional" provisional liquidators, appointed under section 193 of the Hong Kong Companies (Winding Up and Miscellaneous Provisions) Ordinance (Cap 32); there are also provisional liquidators appointed pursuant to a members' voluntary liquidation under section 228A of the Ordinance, and there are "Panel T" appointments under section 194(1A) of the Ordinance whereby the Official Receiver is appointed as provisional liquidator.

Since the decision in the Legend case in 2006 provisional liquidation may not be used as a means of shielding the company from creditor's claims to facilitate a restructuring in Hong Kong, although prior to that date the practice was relatively common.

=== South Africa ===
In South Africa, "provisional liquidation" has a very different meaning. When a creditor or other person applies to the court for the liquidation of a business, then the order is first made a provisional basis, and then subsequent confirmed (or not) at a full hearing, much like a decree nisi and a decree absolut in other jurisdictions.

=== United Kingdom ===
In the United Kingdom the power to appoint a provisional liquidator is found in section 135(1), of the Insolvency Act 1986, and it is regarded as an "emergency procedure". The categories of persons who may apply for the appointment are set out at rule 4.25(1) of the Insolvency Rules 1986 (SI 1986/1925). Under English law, all provisional liquidators are required to be licensed insolvency practitioners. If upon the application for the appointment of a liquidator, there are concerns about potential dissipation of assets or misconduct on the part of the directors, then the court may order the appointment of a provisional liquidator. Provisional liquidation is essentially an "emergency procedure". A provisional liquidator may only be appointed by the court only after a winding-up petition has been presented The main reason for appointing a provisional liquidator is normally to preserve the company's assets. In practice most instances of applications for a provisional liquidator involve some kind of fraud or other misconduct. The applicant will normally need to show that (a) it is likely that a winding-up order will be made at the hearing of the petition; and (b) the company's assets are at risk prior to the hearing of the petition (which includes either dissipation of the company's assets, or the potential loss or destruction of the company's books and records. Accordingly, it will normally be necessary to establish either (or both) that: (a) the company is clearly insolvent, and it is likely that a winding-up order will be made at the hearing of the petition; and/or (b) there has been the type of misconduct that would justify a just and equitable winding-up. An appointment of a provisional liquidator may also be made where it is in the public interest.

Because of the emergency nature of the remedy applications for provisional liquidation are very often made urgently and without giving notice to the company. In such cases, the applicant is under a legal obligation to give full and frank disclosure to the court of all material facts, including facts which are adverse to the applicant's own case. The applicant will also normally be required to give an undertaking in damages in the event the court subsequently determines that the order should not have been made to compensate the company for any damage caused to it by the appointment.

If a provisional liquidator is appointed then the powers of the company's directors are effectively terminated, and the board will retain only a residual power to apply to dismiss or resist the winding-up petition. The appointment of a provisional liquidator comes to an end when:

1. a liquidator is appointed at a full hearing;
2. the provisional liquidator is discharged by order of the court; or
3. the underlying winding up petition is dismissed.
