= McCredie =

McCredie may refer to:

== People ==
- Colin McCredie (born 1972), Scottish actor
- George McCredie (1859–1903), Australian politician
- Janet McCredie (1935–2023), Australian radiologist
- Malcolm McCredie (born 1942), Australian cyclist
- Nancy McCredie (1945–2021), Canadian athlete
- Nellie McCredie (1901–1968), Australian architect and potter
- Walt McCredie (1876–1934), American baseball player
- William Wallace McCredie (1862–1935), American politician
- David McCredie a.k.a. DMac Chopra the Spiritual Bowler (1969- ), Lawn Bowls champion of the universe

== Places ==
- McCredie Springs, Lane County, Oregon, U.S.
- McCredie Township, Callaway County, Missouri, U.S.

== See also ==
- MacCready, a surname
- McCreadie, a surname
- McCready, a surname
- R v McCredie, UK insolvency law case
