= Undervalue transaction =

An undervalue transaction is a transaction entered into by a company who subsequently goes into bankruptcy which the court orders be set aside, usually upon the application of a liquidator for the benefit of the debtor's creditors. This can occur where the transaction was seriously disadvantageous to the company and the company was insolvent or in immediate risk of becoming insolvent.

== Overview ==
Under ordinary principles of contract law, the courts will not generally look into the adequacy of the consideration provided by either side. However, if a company is in real peril of going bankrupt, many legal systems provide for a mechanism which allows these transactions to be unwound, so as to prevent prejudice to the creditors of the company.

Normally, for a transaction to be set aside as an undervalue transaction, the liquidator or equivalent must demonstrate that:

1. the consideration received by the company in the transaction, in money or money's worth is significantly less than the value, in money or money's worth, provided by the company;
2. the transaction was entered into during the "vulnerability period"; and
3. at the time of the transaction, the company was unable to pay its debts as they fell due, or became unable to pay its debts as they fell due as a result of the transaction.

The vulnerability period is the period of time immediately prior to the company going into bankruptcy. The length of the vulnerability period varies between countries, and some countries apply different vulnerability periods in different circumstances.

The effect of a successful application to have a transaction declared as an undervalue transaction varies. Inevitably the other party to the transaction who received the benefit has to return the benefit (or account for it) it to the liquidator. In some countries the assets are treated in the normal way, and may be taken by any secured creditors who have a security interest which catches the assets (characteristically, a floating charge). However, some countries have "ring-fenced" recoveries of unfair preferences so that they are made available to the pool of assets for unsecured creditors.

Many jurisdictions which have prohibitions on undervalue transactions also provide for an exception in the case of transactions entered into in the ordinary course of business where the directors are of a view that it is for the benefit of the company, and such transactions are usually either validated or presumed to be validated.

== In individual jurisdictions ==
=== United Kingdom ===
A transaction at an undervalue in U.K. insolvency law can only be pursued by an administrator or liquidator of the company. The transaction must have been a gift, or a transaction where the company received consideration of money or money's worth which was significantly lower in value than the asset was worth. In Re MC Bacon Ltd (No 1), the court held that the granting of security could not be considered an undervalue transaction as it does not deplete or diminish the value of the assets of the company. In Phillips v Brewin Dolphin Bell Lawrie, the court held that it may be appropriate to consider the details of a series of linked transactions when determining whether the transaction was for an undervalue.

In order for a transaction at an undervalue to be proved, the test in section 240 of the Insolvency Act 1986 must be satisfied. The transaction must have occurred within the relevant period of two years. The period is calculated by reference to the period of time immediately preceding the onset of liquidation. There is also a requirement for the company to have been insolvent when the transaction was entered into, or for the company to have become insolvent as a result of the transaction. This is presumed for a 'connected person', which may be rebutted, but must be proven by the liquidator or administrator in all other cases. There is a defence which the recipient of the transaction can rely on under section 238(5) of the Insolvency Act 1986 which applies where a transaction was entered in good faith, for the purpose of carrying on the business, and there were reasonable grounds when it was entered to believe that it would benefit the company.

If it is proven that there was a transaction at an undervalue, then the transaction is voidable at the court's discretion and there are a number of possible court orders. These are listed in section 241 of the Insolvency Act 1986 and include returning the property to the company, returning the proceeds of sale to the company, and the discharge of any security.

=== Australia ===
An uncommercial transaction in Australian insolvency law occurs if it could be expected that a reasonable person in the same circumstances as the company would not have entered into the transaction with regard to the benefits and detriments to the company, the benefits to any other party to the transaction, and any other relevant matter. Section 588FB(2) of the Corporations Act 2001 provides that there is no requirement for a creditor of the company to be party to the transaction and that there can still be an uncommercial transaction where it was the result of an Australian court order or agency direction.

The vulnerability period for an uncommercial transaction is two years, or four years where there is a 'connected person'.

=== Canada ===
A transfer at undervalue occurs in Canadian insolvency law where there is a transfer of property or the provision of services for which the debtor company gives a consideration of nil or conspicuously less than fair market value. A trustee must bring an application under section 96 of the Bankruptcy and Insolvency Act for the court to declare a transaction void. The trustee has different legal requirements where the party was or was not dealing at arm's length with the debtor. Where the parties were at arm's length, the trustee must prove that the transaction was at an undervalue, it occurred during the one year before the initial bankruptcy event, the debtor company was insolvent at the time of the transaction or was made insolvent because of it, and the company intended to "defraud, defeat or delay" a creditor.

Where the parties were not dealing at arm's length, then the trustee must prove that the transaction was at an undervalue and that either the transfer occurred during the one year before the initial bankruptcy event or the bankruptcy occurred in the five years before the initial bankruptcy event and the company was insolvent at the time of the transaction or was made insolvent because of it and the company intended to "defraud, defeat or delay" a creditor.

=== South Africa ===
A disposition without value in South African insolvency law can be set aside by the court under section 26 of the Insolvency Act 1936. This occurs where the debtor made such a disposition more than two years before the sequestration of his estate and it can be proven that immediately after the disposition, debtor's liabilities exceeded his assets, or the disposition occurred within two years of the sequestration of the estate and the person who received the disposition cannot prove that immediately after the transaction, the assets of the debtor exceeded his liabilities.

== See also ==
- Unfair preference
- Voidable floating charge
