= McCreadie =

Origin
- Region of origin: Scottish

Other names
- Variant form: McCready

McCreadie is a Scottish surname; along with MacCready and McCredie it is a variant of the Irish McCready. It is uncommon as a given name. People with the surname include:

- Andrew McCreadie (1863–1936), Scottish footballer
- Drew McCreadie (born 1967), Canadian actor, playwright and improviser
- Eddie McCreadie (1940–2026), Scottish footballer and manager
- Fergus McCreadie (born 1997), Scottish jazz pianist
- Harvey McCreadie (1942–2008), Scottish footballer
- Hugh McCreadie (1874–?), Scottish footballer
- Michael McCreadie (born 1946), Scottish Paralympic athlete
- Tim McCreadie (born 1974), American dirt modified racing driver
