= McCready =

Origin
- Meaning: trained and expert
- Region of origin: Scottish and Irish

Other names
- Variant form: McCreadie

McCready is an Irish and Scottish surname. It is the Anglicized form of Gaelic Mac Riada "son of Riada", a personal name meaning "trained" and "expert". McCready is a variant of McCreadie; other variants are MacCready and McCredie. The McCready clan originally came from Bute but then settled in North Ayrshire and County Down in Ulster.

People with the surname include:

- Allan McCready (1916–2003), New Zealand politician
- Benjamin McCready (1951–2023), American portrait painter
- Chris McCready (born 1981), English footballer
- Connie McCready (1921–2000), American politician
- Elin McCready, American linguist
- Esther McCready (1931–2020), American nurse
- Fergus McCreadie, Scottish jazz musician (pianist and leader of the band)
- George McCready Price (1870–1963), Canadian creationist
- John McCready, New Zealand businessman
- Keith McCready (born 1957), American professional pool player
- Kevin F. McCready (1957–2004), American clinical psychologist
- Lauren S. McCready (1915–2007), Rear Admiral and founder of the United States Merchant Marine Academy
- Mike McCready (disambiguation), or Michael McCready, multiple people
- Mindy McCready (1975–2013), American country music artist
- Niall McCready, Irish Gaelic footballer
- Pat McCready (born 1974), Canadian lacrosse player
- Scott McCready (born 1977), British football (American) player
- Sam McCready (disambiguation), several people

== See also ==
- Gwyn Cready (born 1962), American author
