= Phillips v Brewin Dolphin Bell Lawrie =

- Court: House of Lords
- Citations: [2001] UKHL 2, [2001] 1 BCLC 145

Court membership
- Judges sitting: Lord Steyn, Lord Hutton, Lord Hobhouse, Lord Millett and Lord Scott

Keywords
- Voidable preference, undervalue transaction

Phillips v Brewin Dolphin Bell Lawrie [2001] UKHL 2 is a leading United Kingdom insolvency law case, concerning voidable transactions.

In this case, the court examined whether a series of arrangements could be understood as one "transaction" for the purposes of being an undervalue transaction under the Insolvency Act 1986. Ultimately, the court found that, for the purposes of insolvency law, it may be appropriate to consider details of a complex series of linked transactions to assess whether the transaction was undertaken at an ‘undervalue’.

== Facts ==
Mr Phillips, the liquidator of AJ Bekhor & Co, sought to recover the £725,000 and interest for a business and asset that had been transferred to a subsidiary, which in turn was bought by Brewin Dolphin (asset management firm in London) through a share purchase for £1. The question was whether this constituted a transaction at an undervalue contrary to the Insolvency Act 1986 section 238. Brewin Dolphin contended that part of the agreement was that its parent company, Private Capital Group Ltd, would pay AJ Bekhor four yearly instalments of £312,000 for renting computer equipment. The covenant for the rental had been sublet to BD by AJB despite an absolute bar in the head lease.

The trial judge and the Court of Appeal refused to take the computer rental agreement into account, as part of consideration for the share transaction.

== Judgment ==
The House of Lords held that the transaction was effected at an undervalue, was voidable under section 238. The computer rental agreement was taken as consideration for the deal, but when assessing its value, reality and not speculative values should not be taken into account. The collateral agreement was precarious, and worthless because the headlessors had immediately declared the transaction to be a repudiatory breach, and it therefore had no value to Brewin Dolphin.

== See also ==
- UK insolvency law
- R v McCredie [1999] EWCA Crim 2155; [2000] 2 BCLC 438
