= Metal Manufactures v Morton =

Metal Manufacturers Pty Ltd v Gavin Morton as Liquidator of MJ Woodman Electrical Contractors Pty Ltd (in Liquidation) & Anor is a decision of the High Court of Australia.

The decision concerned the availability of statutory set off under a section of the Corporations Act, section 533C(1).

The case involved a company (Metal Manufacturers) that had been paid money by another company in liquidation. The liquidator attempted to recover those payments as unfair preference payments under s588FA of the Act. Metal Manufacturers sought to 'set off' its liability to repay the unfair preferences, because they had other, separate and legitimate debts owed to them by the liquidated company.

== Background ==
The Full Federal Court decided that statutory set-off under s533C(1) was unavailable.

Metal Manufacturers then appealed to the High Court, and submitted it was entitled to set off its liability under the 'unfair preference' provisions, because there had been a 'mutual dealing' between it and the liquidated company. They claimed that their future liability under statute to repay the unfair preferences, was no different to any other claim owed to the liquidated company.

== Judgement ==
The High Court unanimously decided for the liquidator. In doing so, it decided that s553C(1) requires that mutual dealings have arisen from circumstances that subsisted in some way prior to the commencement of the winding up. Here, there was no mutual dealing to 'set off' at the commencement of the winding up; at that time the liquidated company owed money to Metal Manufacturers.

i.e. Metal Manufacturers did not yet owe money to the liquidated company as prior to the liquidation s588FF had not yet come into effect.

The court additionally justified its ruling by finding there was no 'mutual dealing' between the companies within the meaning of s553C(1), and there was no mutuality of interest.
