= Re Agriplant Services Ltd =

- Court: High Court
- Citation: [1997] 2 BCLC 598

Court membership
- Judge sitting: Jonathan Parker J

Keywords
- Voidable preference

Re Agriplant Services Ltd [1997] 2 BCLC 598 is a UK insolvency law case, concerning voidable preferences under s 239 of the Insolvency Act 1986. It is an example of what will be considered an unlawful and voidable preference when a company is close to insolvency.

== Facts ==
Agriplant leased some equipment from Closed Asset Finance Ltd (CAF) for its agricultural and earth moving business. It owed £20,000 to CAF, and the debt was guaranteed by Agriplant's majority shareholder, Mr George Sagar. An accountant advised no payments should be made to any creditors, but when Agriplant got more money on one of its contracts, it paid off CAF. It went into liquidation shortly after. One of the liquidators was the accountant. The liquidators sought an order that Mr Sagar or CAF should repay the £20,000 sum. Mr Sagar argued he had no desire to put himself or CAF in a better position before liquidation began.

== Judgment ==
Jonathan Parker J ordered repayment by Closed Asset Finance Ltd of the £20,000. It was indisputable that the payment to CAF improved CAF's position and Mr Sagar's position (because he was going to be liable under the guarantee). It was therefore a voidable preference under the Insolvency Act 1986, s.239(4). Mr Sagar had his own liability in mind, so he wanted to reduce Agriplant's debt and his own personal liability.

== See also ==
- Re MC Bacon Ltd (No 1) [1990] BCC 78 Ch D
