= MacCready =

MacCready is a Scottish version of the Gaelic surname McCready, McCreadie or McCredie. Notable people with the surname include:

- Derek MacCready (born 1967), Canadian football league player
- Paul MacCready (born 1925), American aerospace engineer and champion glider pilot
  - 24643 MacCready, a Mars-crossing asteroid, named after Paul MacCready

== See also ==
- Gwyn Cready (born 1962) U.S. author
