= Sam McCready =

Sam McCready may refer to:

- Sam McCready, the central character in the 1989-1990 telefilm series Frederick Forsyth Presents
- Sam McCready, the main character in the 1991 Frederick Forsyth novel The Deceiver
- Sam McCready (actor) (1936–2019), actor, director and writer from Belfast
- Max McCready (1918–1994), Samuel Maxwell McCready, Irish amateur golfer

== See also ==
- Sam (disambiguation)
- McCready
