= Factors Act 1889 =

Act of the Parliament of the United Kingdom

Factors Act 1889 (Note: Section 17.)
- Act of Parliament
- Parliament of the United Kingdom
- Long title: An Act to amend and consolidate the Factors Acts.
- Citation: 52 & 53 Vict. c. 45
- Introduced by: Hardinge Giffard, 1st Baron Halsbury (Lords)
- Territorial extent: England and Wales; Scotland (Note: By the Factors (Scotland) Act 1890 (53 & 54 Vict. c. 40)); Ireland; (Note: Section 16.)

Dates
- Royal assent: 26 August 1889
- Commencement: 1 January 1890 (Note: Section 15.)
Other legislation
Amends	See § Repealed enactments
Repeals/revokes	See § Repealed enactments
Amended by	Factors (Scotland) Act 1890; Statute Law Revision Act 1908; Statute Law Revision Act 1948; Consumer Credit Act 1974

Status: Amended

History of passage through Parliament

Records of Parliamentary debate relating to the statute from Hansard

Text of statute as originally enacted

Revised text of statute as amended

Text of the Factors Act 1889 as in force today (including any amendments) within the United Kingdom, from legislation.gov.uk.

The Factors Act 1889 (52 & 53 Vict. c. 45) is an act of the Parliament of the United Kingdom that consolidated several earlier enactments related to factors in the United Kingdom.

== Passage ==
The Factors Bill had its first reading in the House of Lords on 19 March 1889, introduced by the Lord Chancellor, Hardinge Giffard, 1st Baron Halsbury. The bill had its second reading in the House of Lords on 6 May 1889 and was committed to the Standing Committee for Bills relating to Law, &c, which reported on 28 June 1889, with amendments. The amended bill was re-committed to a committee of the whole house, which met and reported on 1 July 1889, without amendments. The amended bill had its third reading in the House of Lords on 2 July 1889 and passed, without amendments.

The bill had its first reading in the House of Commons on 4 July 1889. The bill had its second reading in the House of Commons on 19 July 1889 and was committed to the Standing Committee on Trade, Shipping and Manufactures (including Agriculture and Fishing), which reported on 25 July 1889, with amendments. The amended bill was considered and was re-committed to a committee of the whole house on 31 July 1889, which met on 31 July 1889 and reported on 2 August 1889, with amendments. The amended bill had its third reading in the House of Commons on 2 August 1889 and passed, without amendments.

The amended bill was considered and agreed to by the House of Lords on 9 August 1889, with amendments, which were considered and agreed to by the House of Commons on 13 August 1889.

The bill was granted royal assent on 26 August 1889.

== Provisions ==
=== Defined terms ===
Terms defined for the purposes of the act included:

- mercantile agent: a person who, in the customary course of his business as an agent, had authority from another person to sell, consign or buy goods, or to raise money on the security of goods
- document of title: the meaning of the term included a bill of lading and any other document used in the ordinary course of business to prove possession or control of goods
- pledge: the term included any contract pledging or giving lien or security on goods, whether in consideration of an original advance or a further or continuing advance.

=== Repealed enactments ===
Section 14 of the act repealed four earlier enactments, listed in the schedule to the act. Section 14 of the act also provided that the repeals would not affect any right acquired or liability incurred before the commencement of the act.

Citation	Short title	Description	Extent of repeal
4 Geo. 4. c. 83	Factor Act 1823	An Act for the better protection of the property of merchants and others who may hereafter enter into contracts or agreements in relation to goods, wares, or merchandises entrusted to factors or agents.	The whole act.
6 Geo. 4. c. 94	Factor Act 1825	An Act to alter and amend an Act for the better protection of the property of merchants and others who may hereafter enter into contracts or agreements in relation to goods, wares, or merchandise entrusted to factors or agents.	The whole act. (Note: The act was repealed for Scotland by the Factors (Scotland) Act 1890 (53 & 54 Vict. c. 40).)
5 & 6 Vict. c. 39	Factors Act 1842	An Act to amend the law relating to advances bonâ fide made to agents entrusted with goods.	The whole act. (Note: The act was repealed for Scotland by the Factors (Scotland) Act 1890 (53 & 54 Vict. c. 40).)
40 & 41 Vict. c. 39	Factors Act 1877	An Act to amend the Factors Acts.	The whole act. (Note: The act was repealed for Scotland by the Factors (Scotland) Act 1890 (53 & 54 Vict. c. 40).)

== Subsequent developments ==
The act was described as a consolidation act.

The act was extended to Scotland by section 1 of the Factors (Scotland) Act 1890 (53 & 54 Vict. c. 40).
