= Re MC Bacon Ltd (No 1) =

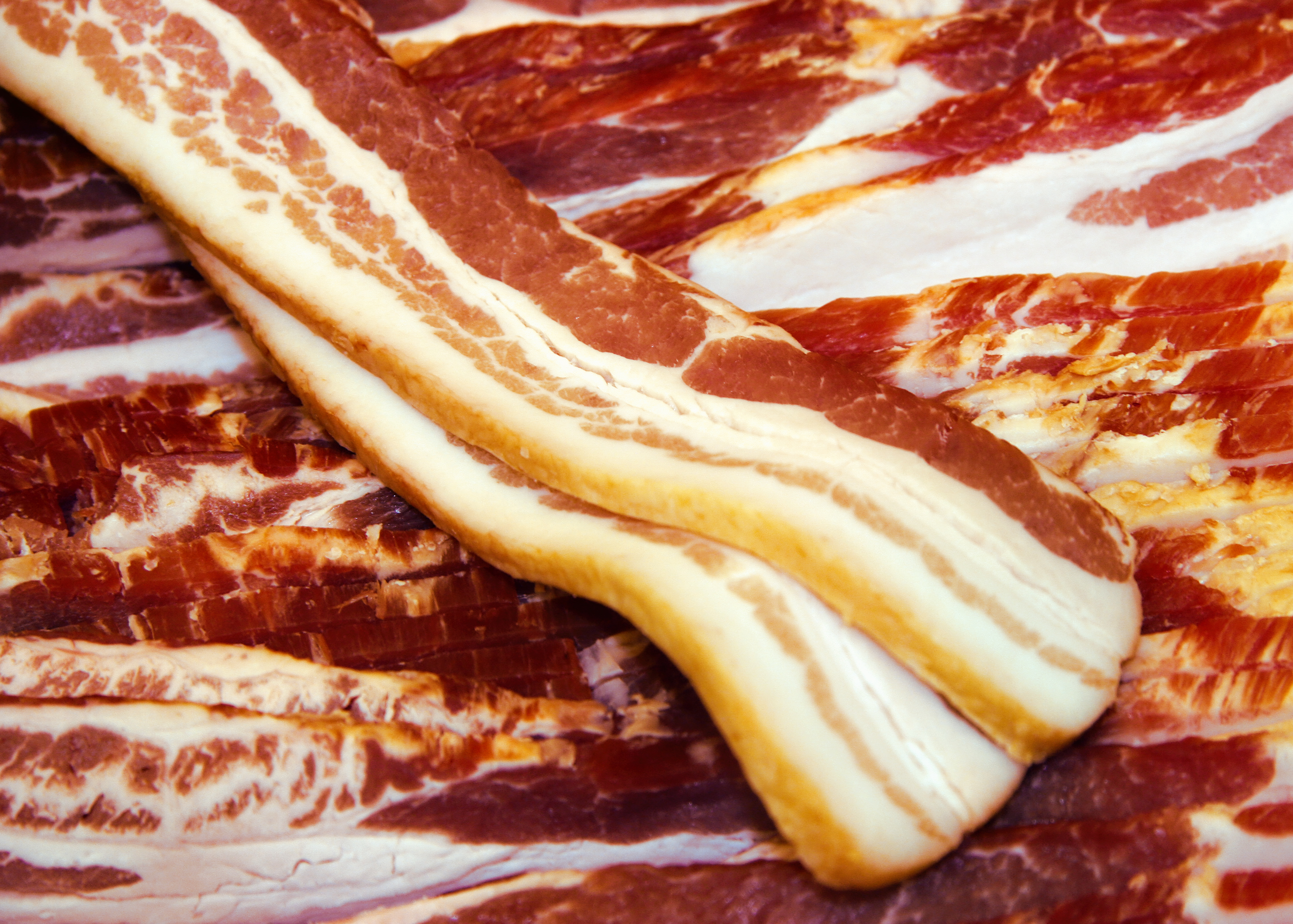
- Court: High Court
- Full case name: In re MC Bacon Ltd
- Decided: 30 November 1989
- Citations: [1990] BCC 78 [1990] BCLC 324

Case opinions
- Millett J

Keywords
- Voidable preference; undervalue transaction

Re MC Bacon Ltd [1990] BCLC 324 is a leading UK insolvency law case, concerning transactions at an undervalue (Insolvency Act 1986, s 238) and voidable preferences (Insolvency Act 1986, s 239).

The court held that where a person granting security to a bank under commercial pressure from the bank, there was no "intention to prefer" the bank under the meaning in the Act. The granting of the security was a response to the commercial pressure, and not an intention to prefer one creditor above others.

Although the decision is only a first instance decision in the United Kingdom, it has been followed in a number of other jurisdictions in relation to the proper determination of intention to prefer.

== Facts ==
MC Bacon Ltd imported bacon, its main office on 192-194 Trundley’s Road, London. Started in 1973 it did normal bacon and then from 1983 diversified into gammon steaks, joints and rashered bacon. But in 1986 Dee Corporation, its principal supplier withdrew. Two directors, Mr Creal and Mr Glover took legal advice but decided to keep trading. It made redundancies but still could not keep up. Mr Creal was old and wanted his son to take over. Mr Glover was 22.5 stone and had arthritis and could not do the work with his previous vitality. In May 1986 its bank, NatWest, granted an overdraft facility, secured with a debenture. It was clear that the company was already insolvent and needed the bank’s help to keep going. The company went into creditor voluntary liquidation in August 1987 with a deficiency of about £330,000 to unsecured creditors. The liquidator argued the debenture was either a voidable preference or transaction at an undervalue. It also brought a wrongful trading claim against the bank as a shadow director, but that claim was abandoned during the course of trial.

The bank had applied to have the entire claim struck out as disclosing no reasonable cause of action. That strike out application came before Knox J. He declined to strike out the claim, and it proceeded to trial before Millet J. The hearing before Millet J lasted 17 days.

== Judgment ==
Millett J held that the company and its directors had not done anything in contravention of sections 238 or 239. A transaction that results in preferential status for one creditor is only voidable under section 239 if a company positively wishes, or desires, to prefer that creditor, and that desire influences entering the transaction. Here the directors did not want to improve the bank's position, but simply wished to continue trading. The creation of the security in favour of the bank was not a transaction at an undervalue within the meaning of section 238 because it did not deplete or diminish the value of the assets of the company. His judgment went as follows.

The applicant now claims to have the debenture set aside (1) under sec. 239 of the Insolvency Act 1986 (“the Act”) as a voidable preference, or (2) under sec. 238 of the Act as a transaction at an undervalue. Originally the applicant also alleged that from 15 April 1987 onwards the bank was a shadow director of the company and claimed that it had thereby rendered itself responsible for what was alleged to have been the wrongful trading of the company on and after 15 May 1987. These last mentioned allegations were rightly abandoned by the applicant after six days of oral evidence. As a result, I can set out the facts at shorter length and in less detail than would otherwise have been the case...

So far as I am aware, this is the first case under the section and its meaning has been the subject of some debate before me. I shall therefore attempt to provide some guidance.

The section replaces sec. 44(1) of the Bankruptcy Act 1914, which in certain circumstances deemed fraudulent and avoided payments made and other transactions entered into in favour of a creditor “with a view of giving such creditor … a preference over the other creditors”. Section 44(1) and its predecessors had been construed by the courts as requiring the person seeking to avoid the payment or other transaction to establish that it had been made “with the dominant intention to prefer” the creditor.

Section 44(1) has been replaced and its language has been entirely recast. Every single word of significance, whether in the form of statutory definition or in its judicial exposition, has been jettisoned. “View”, “dominant”, “intention” and even “to prefer” have all been discarded. These are replaced by “influenced”, “desire”, and “to produce in relation to that person the effect mentioned in subsec. (4)(b) ”.

I therefore emphatically protest against the citation of cases decided under the old law. They cannot be of any assistance when the language of the statute has been so completely and deliberately changed. It may be that many of the cases which will come before the courts in future will be decided in the same way that they would have been decided under the old law. That may be so, but the grounds of decision will be different. What the court has to do is to interpret the language of the statute and apply it. It will no longer enquire whether there was “a dominant intention to prefer” the creditor, but whether the company's decision was “influenced by a desire to produce … the effect mentioned in subsec. (4)(b) ”.

This is a completely different test. It involves at least two radical departures from the old law. It is no longer necessary to establish a dominant intention to prefer. It is sufficient that the decision was influenced by the requisite desire. That is the first change. The second is that it is no longer sufficient to establish an intention to prefer. There must be a desire to produce the effect mentioned in the subsection.

This second change is made necessary by the first, for without it, it would be virtually impossible to uphold the validity of a security taken in exchange for the injection of fresh funds into a company in financial difficulties. A man is taken to intend the necessary consequences of his actions, so that an intention to grant a security to a creditor necessarily involves an intention to prefer that creditor in the event of insolvency. The need to establish that such intention was dominant was essential under the old law to prevent perfectly proper transactions from being struck down. With the abolition of that requirement intention could not remain the relevant test. Desire has been substituted. That is a very different matter. Intention is objective, desire is subjective. A man can choose the lesser of two evils without desiring either.

It is not, however, sufficient to establish a desire to make the payment or grant the security which it is sought to avoid. There must have been a desire to produce the effect mentioned in the subsection, that is to say, to improve the creditor's position in the event of an insolvent liquidation. A man is not to be taken as desiring all the necessary consequences of his actions. Some consequences may be of advantage to him and be desired by him; others may not affect him and be matters of indifference to him; while still others may be positively disadvantageous to him and not be desired by him, but be regarded by him as the unavoidable price of obtaining the desired advantages. It will still be possible to provide assistance to a company in financial difficulties provided that the company is actuated only by proper commercial considerations. Under the new regime a transaction will not be set aside as a voidable preference unless the company positively wished to improve the creditor's position in the event of its own insolvent liquidation.

There is, of course, no need for there to be direct evidence of the requisite desire. Its existence may be inferred from the circumstances of the case just as the dominant intention could be inferred under the old law. But the mere presence of the requisite desire will not be sufficient by itself. It must have influenced the decision to enter into the transaction. It was submitted on behalf of the bank that it must have been the factor which “tipped the scales”. I disagree. That is not what subsec. (5) says; it requires only that the desire should have influenced the decision. That requirement is satisfied if it was one of the factors which operated on the minds of those who made the decision. It need not have been the only factor or even the decisive one. In my judgment, it is not necessary to prove that, if the requisite desire had not been present, the company would not have entered into the transaction. That would be too high a test.

It was also submitted that the relevant time was the time when the debenture was created. That cannot be right. The relevant time was the time when the decision to grant it was made. In the present case that is not known with certainty. It was probably some time between 15 April and 20 May, although as early as 3 April Mr Glover and Mr Creal had resigned themselves to its inevitability. But it does not matter. If the requisite desire was operating at all, it was operating throughout...

[...Millett J then discussed the evidence and said it should there was no desire to prefer the creditors. He then proceeded to section 238, read the text and continued...]

The granting of the debenture was not a gift, nor was it without consideration. The consideration consisted of the bank's forbearance from calling in the overdraft and its honouring of cheques and making of fresh advances to the company during the continuance of the facility. The applicant relies therefore on paragraph (b).

To come within that paragraph the transaction must be:

(1) entered into by the company;
(2) for a consideration;
(3) the value of which measured in money or money's worth;
(4) is significantly less than the value;
(5) also measured in money or money's worth;
(6) of the consideration provided by the company.

It requires a comparison to be made between the value obtained by the company for the transaction and the value of consideration provided by the company. Both values must be measurable in money or money's worth and both must be considered from the company's point of view.

In my judgment, the applicant's claim to characterise the granting of the bank's debenture as a transaction at an undervalue is misconceived. The mere creation of a security over a company's assets does not deplete them and does not come within the paragraph. By charging its assets the company appropriates them to meet the liabilities due to the secured creditor and adversely affects the rights of other creditors in the event of insolvency. But it does not deplete its assets or diminish their value. It retains the right to redeem and the right to sell or remortgage the charged assets. All it loses is the ability to apply the proceeds otherwise than in satisfaction of the secured debt. That is not something capable of valuation in monetary terms and is not customarily disposed of for value.

In the present case the company did not suffer that loss by reason of the grant of the debenture. Once the bank had demanded a debenture the company could not have sold or charged its assets without applying the proceeds in reduction of the overdraft; had it attempted to do so, the bank would at once have called in the overdraft. By granting the debenture the company parted with nothing of value, and the value of the consideration which it received in return was incapable of being measured in money or money's worth.

Mr Vos submitted that the consideration which the company received was, with hindsight, of no value. It merely gained time and with it the opportunity to lose more money. But he could not and did not claim that the company ought to have received a fee or other capital sum in return for the debenture. That gives the game away. The applicant's real complaint is not that the company entered into the transaction at an undervalue but that it entered into it at all.

In my judgment, the transaction does not fall within subsec. (4), and it is unnecessary to consider the application of subsec. (5) which provides a defence to the claim in certain circumstances.

IV. Conclusion

In my judgment, the granting of the debenture to the bank was neither a voidable preference nor a transaction at an undervalue and I dismiss the application.

== Significance ==
This case was one of the earliest decided cases under new provisions of the Insolvency Act 1986. In a subsequent case, Re MC Bacon Ltd (No 2) Millett J went on to further important clarifications as the context and effect of the provisions and how to deal with the proceeds of anything recovered under s 214 (for the purposes of whether the costs were an expense of the liquidation under rule 4.218(1)(a)). Therefore, any recovery would not go to secured creditors.

== See also ==
- UK insolvency law
- Re Agriplant Services Ltd [1997] 2 BCLC 598
