= Harvey McCreadie =

Scottish footballer

Personal information
- Full name: William Harvey McCreadie
- Date of birth: 1 October 1942
- Place of birth: Glenluce, Scotland
- Date of death: 30 September 2008 (aged 65)
- Place of death: Dumfries, Scotland
- Position: Centre forward

Senior career*
Years	Team	Apps	(Gls)
- Stranraer
1959–1960	Accrington Stanley	28	(10)
1960	Luton Town	1	(0)
1960–1961	Wrexham	10	(2)
1961–1962	Mossley	44	(36)
1962–1963	Hibernian	9	(3)
1963-1964	Sankey's of Wellington		
1964	Altrincham	19	(7)
- * Club domestic league appearances and goals

William Harvey McCreadie (1 October 1942 – 30 September 2008) was a Scottish professional footballer who played as a centre forward.

== Career ==
Starting out at Scottish club Stranraer, McCreadie would move to English Accrington Stanley in 1959.

In 1960 he would move to Luton Town, however he would only make one appearance before moving to Wrexham

He would then move to English non-league club Mossley, where he would score 36 goals in 44 games for the club.

His form at Mossley would earn him a move to Scottish First Division team Hibernian for a fee of £1,000 in 1962. He would only make 9 appearances there however before moving to Altrincham. His time with Altrincham was interrupted by poor behaviour and his contract was cancelled. Following his release, McCreadie retired aged 22.
