= Unfair preference =

Legal term in bankruptcy law

An unfair preference (or "voidable preference") is a legal term arising in bankruptcy law where a person or company transfers assets or pays a debt to a creditor shortly before going into bankruptcy, that payment or transfer can be set aside on the application of the liquidator or trustee in bankruptcy as an unfair preference or simply a preference.

== Overview ==
The law on unfair preferences varies from country to country, but characteristically, to set a transaction or payment aside as an unfair preference, the liquidator will need to show that:

1. the person or company was insolvent at the time the payment was made (either on the cash-flow test, or on the balance sheet test - it varies from country to country)
1. the person or company then went into bankruptcy within a specified time thereafter, usually referred to as the vulnerability period
2. the payment had the effect of putting the creditor in a better position than other unsecured creditors
3. in some jurisdictions, it is also necessary to show that the bankrupt intended to grant a preference.

In most countries, an application to have a transaction set aside as a preference can only be made by the liquidator or trustee in bankruptcy, as the person making the payment must be in bankruptcy, and thus they are not normally liable to lawsuits from other creditors.

The effect of a successful application to have a transaction declared as an unfair preference varies. Inevitably, the creditor which received the payment or assets has to return it to the liquidator. In some countries, the assets are treated in the normal way, and may be taken by any secured creditors who have a security interest which catches the assets (characteristically, a floating charge). However, some countries have "ring-fenced" recoveries of unfair preferences so that they are made available to the pool of assets for unsecured creditors.

An unfair preference has some of the same characteristics as a fraudulent conveyance, but legally they are separate concepts. There is not normally any requirement to prove an intention to defraud to recover assets under an unfair preference application. However, similar to fraudulent conveyance applications, unfair preferences are often seen in connection with asset protection schemes that are entered into too late by the putative bankrupt.

Many jurisdictions provide for an exception in the case of transactions entered into in the ordinary course of business with a view to keeping the company trading, and such transactions are usually either validated or presumed to be validated.

== In individual jurisdictions ==
=== United Kingdom ===
- Insolvency Act 1986 section 239
- Re MC Bacon Ltd (No 1)

=== United States ===
A preference in U.S. federal bankruptcy law is a transfer of property by a debtor to its creditor, on account of a pre-existing debt, that is made while the debtor is insolvent and gives the creditor more than it would obtain in a liquidation of the debtor's assets in a bankruptcy proceeding. It is primarily a creature of the U.S. Bankruptcy Code, although some states have similar state laws. If the preferential transaction takes place within a specified period of time before the filing of bankruptcy by or on behalf of the debtor, then the debtor's trustee in bankruptcy is authorized to recover the property preferentially transferred. The mechanism of recovery is the avoidance of the transfer. After such avoidance, the recovered property becomes property of the bankruptcy estate. The period is usually 90 days. However, if the preferential transfer is made to an "insider," then the period is one year. An "insider" is generally a relative or one who has the ability to control the activities of the debtor. The Bankruptcy Code provides some exemptions from these rules to accommodate transfers intended to be contemporaneous, made in the ordinary course of business or to the extent they are made for new value, and others.

All of the following examples assume that the requirements for a preference that are set out above exist at the time the transfer is made.

- Securing a previously unsecured debt.
- Substituting property of greater value as security for existing security property whose value is insufficient to completely secure repayment of the debt.
- Paying some but not all unsecured creditors.
- In a real estate transaction, delaying the recording of a mortgage for more than 30 days after the debt it secures is created.

=== Switzerland ===
Under Swiss law, creditors who hold a certificate of unpaid debts against the debtor, or creditors in a bankruptcy, may file suit against third parties who have benefited from unfair preferences or fraudulent transfers by the debtor prior to a seizure of assets or a bankruptcy.

== See also ==
- Undervalue transaction
- Voidable floating charge
