= Liquidator (law) =

Person who liquidates an insolvent company

In law, a liquidator is the officer appointed when a company goes into winding-up or liquidation who has responsibility for collecting in all of the assets under such circumstances of the company and settling all claims against the company before putting the company into dissolution. Liquidator is a person officially appointed to 'liquidate' a company or firm. Their duty is to ascertain and settle the liabilities of a company or a firm. If there are any surplus, then those are distributed to the contributories.

== Origins ==
In English law, the term "liquidator" was first used in the Joint Stock Companies Act 1856. Prior to that time, the equivalent role was fulfilled by "official managers" pursuant to the amendments to the Joint Stock Companies Winding-Up Act 1844 passed in 1848 - 1849.

== Powers ==
In most jurisdictions, a liquidator's powers are defined by statute. Certain powers are generally exercisable without the requirement of any approvals; others may require sanction, either by the court, by an extraordinary resolution (in a members' voluntary winding up) or the liquidation committee or a meeting of the company's creditors .In the United Kingdom, see sections 165-168 of the Insolvency Act 1986

The liquidator would normally require sanction to pay and to make compromises or arrangement with creditors. Without sanction, the liquidator may carry on legal proceedings and carry on the business of the company so far as may be necessary for a beneficial winding-up. Without sanction, the liquidator may sell company property, claim against insolvent contributories, raise money on the security of company assets, and do all such things as may be necessary for the winding-up and distribution of assets.

== Duties ==
In compulsory liquidation, the liquidator must assume control of all property to which the company appears to be entitled. The exercise of their powers is subject to the supervision of the court. They may be compelled to call a meeting of creditors or contributories when requested to do so by those holding above the statutory minimum.

In a voluntary winding-up, the liquidator may exercise the court's power of settling a list of contributories and of making calls, and he may summon general meetings of the company for any purpose he thinks fit. In a creditor's voluntary winding-up, he must report to the creditor's meeting on the exercise of his powers.

The liquidator is generally obliged to make returns and accounts, owes fiduciary duties to the company and should investigate the causes of the company's failure and the conduct of its managers, in the wider public interest of action being taken against those engaged in commercially culpable conduct.

A liquidator who is appointed to wind-up a failing business should act with professional efficiency and not exercise the sort of complacency that might have caused the business to decline in the first place.

== Misconduct ==
Where, during the investigation of the affairs of the company, the liquidator uncovers wrongdoing on the part of the management of the company, he may have power to bring proceedings for wrongful trading or, in extreme cases, for fraudulent trading.

However, the liquidator cannot normally enter into a champertous agreement to assign the fruits of an action to a third party offering to finance the litigation, if the right to said action accrued solely as a result of the liquidator's statutory duties, instead of being a right to action that had existed before the liquidator came on the scene.

The liquidator may also seek to set aside transactions which were entered into by the company in the time immediately preceding the company going into liquidation where he forms the view that they constitute an unfair preference or a transaction at an undervalue.

== Removal ==
Depending upon the type of the liquidation, the liquidator may be removed by the court, by a general meeting of the members or by a general meeting of the creditors.

The court may also remove a liquidator and appoint another if there is "cause shown" by the applicant for his removal. It is not normally necessary to demonstrate personal misconduct or unfitness for this purpose. However, it will be enough if the liquidator fails to display sufficient vigour in the discharge of his duties, for instance, by not establishing the current assets and recent trading of the company or in not attempting to secure favourable terms for the company in relation to the disposal of its assets.

In Australia, a liquidator may be removed by a creditor's resolution, or application to the court.

== See also ==
- Bankruptcy
- Administration (insolvency)
- Provisional liquidator
