= Mike McCready (disambiguation) =

Mike McCready is an American musician, the lead guitarist for Pearl Jam.

Mike McCready may also refer to:

- Mike McCready (politician), former member of the Michigan House of Representatives
- Mike McCready (businessman), American entrepreneur
- Michael McCready (fencer), British Olympic fencer
