= R v McCredie =

2000 UK insolvency law case

- Court: Court of Appeal of England and Wales
- Citation: [2000] 2 BCLC 438

Keywords
- Insolvency, voidable transaction

R v McCredie [2000] 2 BCLC 438 is a UK insolvency law case, concerning voidable transactions.

== Facts ==
Mr McCredie and Mr F were convicted of holding directorships of a company trading under a prohibited name, contrary to the Insolvency Act 1986 section 216(3) and failure to deliver company books to the liquidator contrary to section 208(1)(c). McCredie was further convicted of removing company property fraudulently, contrary to section 206(2) and section 209(1)(b) and F was convicted of failing to deliver company property to the liquidator, contrary to section 208(1)(b). McCredie and F were disqualified for five and three years respectively, F was ordered to pay £3,000 to the liquidator and they were ordered to serve 180 hours and 100 hours community service respectively. McCredie and F appealed, contending that the jury had been misdirected.

== Judgment ==
The Court of Appeal held, dismissing the appeals, that company directors owed a continuing duty to produce to the liquidator all company books, property and assets and were not entitled to wait for a request from the liquidator before their production. That duty of cooperation with the liquidator further extended to the voluntary offering of information relating to the company on an ongoing basis. In the instant case, the judge had erred by failing to obtain the agreement of counsel before distributing a detailed chronology to the jury but the point had not been taken and there was no misdirection capable of affecting the safety of the convictions.

== See also ==
- UK insolvency law
