= Liquidation =

Financial process by which a company is ended

Liquidation or winding-up is the process in law by which a company is brought to an end and its assets and property distributed to claimants. When a company has been liquidated, it is sometimes said to be wound-up or dissolved, although dissolution technically refers only to the final stage of liquidation.

Liquidation may be either compulsory, ordered by a court (sometimes called a creditors' liquidation or, in Australia, a wind-up order), or voluntary, begun by the company's members (a members' or shareholders' liquidation), though some voluntary liquidations are controlled by the creditors.

The term "liquidation" is also used informally for a company divesting some of its assets. A retail chain wishing to close some stores, for instance, may sell them at a discount to a firm specialising in real estate liquidation rather than handle the disposals itself. A company may likewise sell assets in an orderly way outside a formal insolvency, for example to avoid having its portfolio written down in a compulsory liquidation.

In customs law, the term liquidation has a separate meaning: the final computation or ascertainment of the duties or drawback accruing on an imported entry.

== Compulsory liquidation ==
The parties which are entitled by law to petition for the compulsory liquidation of a company vary from jurisdiction to jurisdiction, but generally, a petition may be lodged with the court for the compulsory liquidation of a company by:

- The company itself
- Any creditor which establishes a prima facie case
- Contributories: those who may be required to contribute to the company's assets on liquidation
- A government minister, usually the one responsible for competition and business
- An official receiver

=== Grounds ===
The grounds upon which an entity can apply to the court for an order of compulsory liquidation also vary between jurisdictions, but usually include:

- The company has resolved to be wound up
- The company was incorporated as a corporation, and has not been issued with a trading certificate (or equivalent) within 12 months of registration
- It is an "old public company" (i.e. one that has not re-registered as a public company or become a private company under more recent companies legislation requiring this)
- It has not commenced business within the statutorily prescribed time (normally one year) of its incorporation, or has not carried on business for a statutorily prescribed amount of time
- The number of members has fallen below the minimum prescribed by statute
- The company is unable to pay its debts as they fall due
- It is just and equitable to wind up the company

In practice, the vast majority of compulsory winding-up applications are made under one of the last two grounds.

An order will not generally be made if the purpose of the application is to enforce payment of a debt which is bona fide disputed.

A "just and equitable" winding-up enables the grounds to subject the strict legal rights of the shareholders to equitable considerations. It can take account of personal relationships of mutual trust and confidence in small parties, particularly, for example, where there is a breach of an understanding that all of the members may participate in the business, or of an implied obligation to participate in management. An order might be made where the majority shareholders deprive the minority of their right to appoint and remove their own director.

=== The order ===
Once liquidation commences (which depends upon applicable law, but will generally be when the petition was originally presented, and not when the court makes the order), dispositions of the company's property are generally void, and litigation involving the company is generally restrained.

Upon hearing the application, the court may either dismiss the petition or make the order for winding-up. The court may dismiss the application if the petitioner unreasonably refrains from an alternative course of action.

The court may appoint an official receiver, and one or more liquidators, and has general powers to enable rights and liabilities of claimants and contributories to be settled. Separate meetings of creditors and contributories may decide to nominate a person for the appointment of a liquidator and possibly of a supervisory liquidation committee.

=== Administrative receiver ===
The person appointed by the holder of a floating charge debenture over a company's assets to collect in and realise the assets of that company and to repay the indebtedness to the debenture holder. Administrative receivers can no longer be appointed by floating charge holders, with the exception of floating charges created before 15 September 2003.

== Voluntary liquidation ==
Voluntary liquidation occurs when the members of a company resolve to voluntarily wind up its affairs and dissolve. Voluntary liquidation begins when the company passes the resolution, and the company will generally cease to carry on business at that time (if it has not done so already).

A creditors' voluntary liquidation (CVL) is a process designed to allow an insolvent company to close voluntarily. The decision to liquidate is made by a board resolution, but instigated by the director(s). 75% of the company's shareholders must agree to liquidate for liquidation proceedings to advance. If a limited company's liabilities outweigh its assets, or the company cannot pay its bills when they fall due, the company becomes insolvent.

If the company is solvent, and the members have made a statutory declaration of solvency, the liquidation will proceed as a members' voluntary liquidation (MVL). In that case, the general meeting will appoint the liquidator(s). If not, the liquidation will proceed as a creditors' voluntary liquidation, and a meeting of creditors will be called, to which the directors must report on the company's affairs. Where a voluntary liquidation proceeds as a creditors' voluntary liquidation, a liquidation committee may be appointed.

Where a voluntary winding-up of a company has begun, a compulsory liquidation order is still possible, but the petitioning contributory would need to satisfy the court that a voluntary liquidation would prejudice the contributors.

== Misconduct ==
The liquidator normally has a duty to ascertain whether any misconduct by those who controlled the company has prejudiced the general body of creditors. In some legal systems the liquidator may bring an action against errant directors or shadow directors; under the law of England and Wales, for example, a director may be ordered to contribute to the company's assets for fraudulent trading or wrongful trading.

The liquidator may also determine whether any payment made or transaction entered into by the company can be set aside as a transaction at an undervalue or an unfair preference.

== Priority of claims ==
The main purpose of a liquidation where the company is insolvent is to collect its assets, determine the outstanding claims against the company, and satisfy those claims in the manner and order prescribed by law.

The liquidator must determine the company's title to property in its possession. Property which is in the possession of the company, but which was supplied under a valid retention of title clause will generally have to be returned to the supplier. Property which is held by the company on trust for third parties will not form part of the company's assets available to pay creditors.

Before the claims are met, secured creditors are entitled to enforce their claims against the assets of the company to the extent that they are subject to a valid security interest. In most legal systems, only fixed security takes precedence over all claims; security by way of floating charge may be postponed to the preferential creditors.

Claimants with non-monetary claims against the company may be able to enforce their rights against the company. For example, a party who had a valid contract for the purchase of land against the company may be able to obtain an order for specific performance, and compel the liquidator to transfer title to the land to them, upon tender of the purchase price.

After the removal of all assets which are subject to retention of title arrangements, fixed security, or are otherwise subject to proprietary claims of others, the liquidator will pay the claims against the company's assets. Generally, the priority of claims on the company's assets is determined in the following order:

1. the costs and expenses of the liquidation;
2. creditors holding a fixed charge over the company's assets;
3. preferential creditors, which in many systems include certain employee entitlements;
4. creditors holding a floating charge;
5. unsecured creditors;
6. shareholders, who receive any surplus as a liquidating distribution.

Unclaimed assets will usually vest in the state as bona vacantia.

== Dissolution ==
Having wound-up the company's affairs, the liquidator must call a final meeting of the members (if it is a members' voluntary winding-up), creditors (if it is a compulsory winding-up) or both (if it is a creditors' voluntary winding-up). The liquidator is then usually required to send final accounts to the Registrar and to notify the court. The company is then dissolved.

However, in common jurisdictions, the court has a discretion for a period of time after dissolution to declare the dissolution void to enable the completion of any unfinished business.

== Striking off the register ==
In some jurisdictions, the company may elect to simply be struck off the companies register as a cheaper alternative to a formal winding-up and dissolution. In such cases an application is made to the registrar of companies, who may strike off the company if there is reasonable cause to believe that the company is not carrying on business or has been wound-up and, after enquiry, no case is shown why the company should not be struck off.

However, in such cases the company may be restored to the register if it is just and equitable so to do (for example, if the rights of any creditors or members have been prejudiced).

In the event the company does not file an annual return or annual accounts, and the company's file remains inactive, in due course, the registrar will strike the company off the register.

== Provisional liquidation ==
Under the corporate insolvency laws of a number of common law jurisdictions, where a company has been engaged in misconduct or where the assets of the company are thought to be in jeopardy, it is sometimes possible to put a company into provisional liquidation, whereby a liquidator is appointed on an interim basis to safeguard the position of the company pending the hearing of the full winding-up petition. The duty of the provisional liquidator is to safeguard the assets of the company and maintain the status quo pending the hearing of the petition; the provisional liquidator does not assess claims against the company or try to distribute the company's assets to creditors.

== Phoenix companies ==
In the UK, the directors of an insolvent company sometimes liquidate it and continue the business through a new company, known as a phoenix company, trading under a different name with the same customers and suppliers. This is not unlawful in itself, but under section 216 of the Insolvency Act 1986 (and equivalent legislation in other UK regions) it is an offence to trade under a name that is the same as, or substantially the same as, the liquidated company's without the court's approval. Persons participating in the management of the 'phoenix' company may also be held personally liable for the debts of the company under §217 of the Insolvency Act unless the Court approval has been granted.

== Liquidation by jurisdiction ==
The procedure described above largely follows the law of the United Kingdom. Other jurisdictions provide for liquidation in broadly similar terms, realising a company's assets and applying the proceeds to its creditors, with any surplus distributed to its members.

=== United States ===
In the United States, a company is most often liquidated under Chapter 7 of the Bankruptcy Code, as opposed to a Chapter 11 reorganisation. A bankruptcy trustee gathers and sells the debtor's non-exempt assets and uses the proceeds to pay creditors. Distribution of the estate follows the order set out in 11 U.S.C. § 726, under which the priority claims listed in 11 U.S.C. § 507 (such as administrative expenses and certain wage and tax claims) are paid before general unsecured claims, with any surplus returned to the debtor.

=== European Union ===
Within the European Union, cross-border insolvency and winding-up proceedings are coordinated by Regulation (EU) 2015/848, the European Insolvency Regulation (a recast of Regulation (EC) 1346/2000). It applies to collective proceedings based on insolvency law for the purpose of "rescue, adjustment of debt, reorganisation or liquidation", and allocates jurisdiction and applicable law between member states.

=== Other jurisdictions ===
In India, the Insolvency and Bankruptcy Code, 2016 provides that, where no resolution plan is approved, the adjudicating authority orders the corporate debtor to be liquidated; section 53 sets out a distribution waterfall running from insolvency and liquidation costs through workmen's dues and secured creditors, employees and unsecured creditors, to preference and finally equity shareholders. In Australia, the winding up of an insolvent company under the Corporations Act 2001 places an independent registered liquidator in control of the company to realise its assets and distribute them to creditors.

== See also ==
- Bankruptcy
- Chapter 7, Title 11, United States Code
- Debtor-in-possession financing
- Estate liquidation
- Liquidating dividend
- Pre-pack administration
