= Ordinary course of business =

Term in law

In United States law, the ordinary course of business (OCB) covers the usual transactions, customs and practices of a certain business and of a certain firm. This term is used particularly to judge the validity of certain transactions. It is used in several different sections of the Uniform Commercial Code of the United States.

Section 1-201 of the Uniform Commercial Code defines a "Buyer in the ordinary course of business" by a four-part test:

1. a person that buys goods in good faith,
2. without knowledge that the sale violates the rights of another person in the goods [e.g. a security interest],
3. and in the ordinary course from a person, other than a pawnbroker, in the business of selling goods of that kind.
4. A person buys goods in the ordinary course if the sale to the person comports with the usual or customary practices in the kind of business in which the seller is engaged or with the seller's own usual or customary practices.

[emphasis added].

There are also references to persons acting "in the ordinary course of business" (or "customary course of business") in the United Kingdom's Factors Act 1889, which defines a mercantile agent or factor as "a person who, in the customary course of his business as an agent, had authority from another person to sell, consign or buy goods, or to raise money on the security of goods" and defines a "document of title" to include "a bill of lading and any other document used in the ordinary course of business to prove possession or control of goods". Lord Alverstone noted in the case of Oppenheimer v Attenborough & Son ([1908] 1 K.B. 221) that "acting in the ordinary course of business of a mercantile agent" means that "the person must act in the transaction as a mercantile agent would act if he were carrying out a transaction which he was authorised by his master to carry out".
