= Unsecured creditor =

An unsecured creditor is a creditor other than a preferential creditor that does not have the benefit of any security interests in the assets of the debtor.

In the event of the bankruptcy of the debtor, the unsecured creditors usually obtain a pari passu distribution out of the assets of the insolvent company on a liquidation in accordance with the size of their debt after the secured creditors have enforced their security and the preferential creditors have exhausted their claims.

Although in a liquidation the unsecured creditors will usually realize the smallest proportion of their claims, in some legal systems, unsecured creditors who are also indebted to the insolvent debtor can (and in some jurisdictions, must) set off the debts, putting the unsecured creditor with a matured liability to the debtor in a pre-preferential position.
