= Extraordinary resolution =

In business or commercial law, an extraordinary resolution or special resolution is a resolution passed by the shareholders of a company by a greater majority than is required to pass an ordinary resolution. The precise figures vary in different countries, but commonly an extraordinary resolution must be affirmed by not less than 75% of members casting votes, whereas an ordinary resolution only requires a bare majority. Some jurisdictions use both terms, while meaning slightly different things. For example, in the United Kingdom under the Companies Act 1985, an extraordinary resolution was a resolution passed by not less than 75% of the members, whereas a special resolution was a resolution passed by the same majority, but having given the members not less than 21 days' notice of the intention to put the resolution to a vote. The distinction was not maintained under the Companies Act 2006.

Extraordinary resolutions are generally only required in certain specific situations required by statute. For example, in the United Kingdom, to liquidate a company voluntarily on the ground that it cannot by reason of its insolvency continue its business, requires an extraordinary resolution.

However, in certain circumstances a company may wish to amend its constitutional documents to provide that an extraordinary resolution needs to be passed prior to the company engaging in any reserved matters, purely as a matter of internal organisational control.
