= Secured creditor =

A secured creditor is a creditor with the benefit of a security interest over some or all of the assets of the debtor.

In the event of the bankruptcy of the debtor, the secured creditor can enforce security against the assets of the debtor and avoid competing for a distribution on liquidation with the unsecured creditors.

In most legal systems, secured creditors also have the option of releasing their security and proving in the liquidation, although, in practice, they would rarely do so.

== Canada ==
Under Canadian law, the Bankruptcy and Insolvency Act gives certain preferential treatment to secured creditors.

== United States ==
In the United States, secured interests are governed by Uniform Commercial Code, the Bankruptcy Code, and state law on collections.

== See also ==
- Preferential creditor
