= Nilon Limited v Royal Westminster Investments S.A. =

- Court: Judicial Committee of the Privy Council
- Full case name: Nilon Limited and another v Royal Westminster Investments S.A. and others
- Decided: 21 January 2015
- Citation: [2015] UKPC 2

Court membership
- Judges sitting: Lord Toulson; Lord Mance; Lord Collins; Lord Carnwath; Lord Sumption

Case opinions
- Decision by: Lord Collins

Keywords
- anchor defendant, rectification of share register, forum non conveniens

Nilon Limited v Royal Westminster Investments S.A. [2015] UKPC 2 (21 January 2015), P.C. (on appeal from the British Virgin Islands) is a leading case of the Judicial Committee of the Privy Council on the right of a party to seek rectification of a company's share register, and the use of "anchor defendants". The case also included various obiter comments about the doctrine of forum non conveniens.

== Parties ==
The named claimant, Royal Westminster Investments S.A., was a special purpose company incorporated in Panama, and was alleged to be a nominee of and under the control of the other claimants, who were all members of the same family. Accordingly, in the judgment of the Privy Council all of the respondents are collectively referred to as the "Mahtani parties".

The respondent, Nilon Limited, was a company incorporated in the British Virgin Islands against whom rectification of the share register was sought. Nilon was incorporated on 7 November 2002 by the second defendant, Mr Manmohan Varma. Mr Varma was registered as the sole registered shareholder of all of the issued shares in Nilon.

== Facts ==
The Mahtani parties claimed that there was an oral contract between Mr Varma and themselves which was made in October 2002 in England. The essence of that agreement was that:

1. A new offshore company would be incorporated in the British Virgin Islands to be called Nilon, and it would be operated from Jersey as the holding company of certain Nigerian operating companies, involved in the importation and sale of rice to Nigeria.
2. The executive decision making powers of Nilon would be in the hands of Mr Varma or companies associated with him, and they would be paid a management fee.
3. The Mahtani parties and Mr Varma as joint venture partners would remit an initial payment to a bank account to be opened in the Channel Islands in the name of Nilon as the initial capital.
4. Each side would be entitled to an equal profit share from the businesses run by Nilon.
5. Mr Varma would procure the issue of voting shares in Nilon in such that (i) Mr Varma would own 37.5% of the issued shares in Nilon; (ii) 5% would be allotted to a local Nigerian investor to be agreed between the joint venture partners; and (iii) the remaining 57.5% would be allotted to the Mahtani parties.
6. The Mahtani parties alleged that they contributed funds to Nilon pursuant to this oral agreement, and received dividend payments from Nilon pursuant to it. They claimed to be legal and/or beneficial owners of shares in Nilon, but that Mr Varma failed to procure the allotment of shares in Nilon to them as agreed, or the entry of their names in its share register.

Consequently, they claimed declarations that they are owners of the agreed proportions of the issued shares in Nilon, and sought orders that the share register be rectified under section 43(1)(a) of the BVI Business Companies Act, 2004 to reflect the issuance of those shares.

Mr Varma accepted that there was an agreement reached on the relevant date concerning the terms of a joint venture between him and the Mahtani parties. Those agreed terms included (1) the incorporation of Nilon in the British Virgin Islands; (2) the opening of a joint venture bank account in Jersey into which each joint venture partner would make an initial capital contribution by way of loan; (3) profit sharing arrangements; (4) that all control and decision making powers would vest in him or his group of companies, who would receive a management fee. He accepted that money had been remitted by the Mahtani parties, but claimed that these were loans and were not remitted as the subscription price for shares in Nilon, and that the sums paid by Nilon to the Mahtani parties were not dividends.

== Preliminary issues ==
The Mahtani parties applied to the Commercial Court in the British Virgin Islands for permission to serve Mr Varma out of the jurisdiction. Bannister J initially refused permission to serve out of the jurisdiction because there was no real issue to be tried between the Mahtani parties on their rectification claim, since the Mahtani parties were not shareholders in Nilon and there was no allegation that Nilon itself had ever agreed to allot any shares to them. He further struck out the claim against Nilon for largely the same reasons. The Mahtani parties appealed against both points. The Eastern Caribbean Supreme Court Court of Appeal allowed the appeals by the Mahtani parties and decided that there was an arguable claim against Nilon, and that was a claim to which Mr Varma was a necessary and proper party.

The principal point of law in both instances, whether there is a sustainable claim for rectification of Nilon's share register, was the same in both appeals.

== Decision ==
The only judgment was given by Lord Collins. After drawing attention to minor differences between the procedural rules between the Civil Procedure Rules in England and the British Virgin Islands (which he held were not material for the purposes of the appeal), Lord Collins referred to his own leading judgment setting out the applicable principles in relation to service out in AK Investment CJSC v Kyrgyz Mobil Tel Ltd [2011] UKPC 7, [2012] 1 WLR 1804, at para 71. He summarised those principles as follows:

On an application for service out of the jurisdiction, three requirements have to be satisfied.

- First, the claimant must satisfy the court that in relation to the foreign defendant there is a serious issue to be tried on the merits, i.e. a substantial question of fact or law, or both.
- Second, the claimant must satisfy the court that there is a good arguable case that the claim falls within one or more classes of case in which permission to serve out may be given. In this context "good arguable case" connotes that one side has a much better argument than the other.
- Third, the claimant must satisfy the court that in all the circumstances the forum which is being seised (here the BVI) is clearly or distinctly the appropriate forum for the trial of the dispute, and that in all the circumstances the court ought to exercise its discretion to permit service of the proceedings out of the jurisdiction.

Accordingly, held Lord Collins, the critical issue in the appeal was whether there is a real issue to be tried between the Mahtani parties and Nilon (over whom the British Virgin Islands courts have jurisdiction as of right as a company incorporated in that jurisdiction) such that the Nilon might properly operate as an "anchor defendant" in relation to the claims against Mr Varma. In relation to this point the judge at first instance and the Court of Appeal had disagreed, and their disagreement largely centered upon the decision of the English Court of Appeal in Re Hoicrest [2000] 1 WLR 414. In that case the Court of Appeal had held that a person who had no right to claim legal title to certain shares (only an equitable interest in the shares) was held to be entitled to maintain a claim for rectification of the share register. In a nutshell, Bannister J as the judge at first instance felt this decision was wrong and declined to follow it; the Eastern Caribbean Court of Appeal thought it was correct and reversed him, following the English precedent.

=== Re Hoicrest Ltd ===
After careful analysis of the law in this area, and noting the fact that (i) Re Hoicrest Ltd was the only decision in English legal history to take this approach - every other decision had taken the opposite approach, and (ii) Re Hoicrest Ltd was only in relation to determination of costs in a case management hearing, Lord Collins held that "Re Hoicrest Ltd was wrongly decided and should not have been followed by the Court of Appeal in this case." Accordingly, he allowed the appeal and set aside the permission to serve Mr Varma out of the jurisdiction, and struck out the claim against Nilon.

=== Forum non conveniens ===
Although this analysis was sufficient to dispose of the appeal, Lord Collins added some additional obiter dictum comments in relation to the doctrine of forum non conveniens. The Court of Appeal had held that "the BVI was clearly the appropriate forum for trial as a preliminary issue of the questions arising between the members and alleged members of Nilon." Lord Collins indicated his disagreement with that statement. In this case the principal question was whether there had been a breach of an oral agreement made between Mr Varma and the Mahtani parties. Nilon was an ancillary part to that agreement, and indeed, did not even exist at the time that agreement was entered into. The agreement was entered into in England, and a majority of the relevant parties were resident in England. Accordingly, if viewed properly as a breach of contract claim - rather than a claim for rectification of a share register - then the most appropriate forum for the trial of these actions was in England. Because of Lord Collins' status as general editor of Dicey Morris & Collins on the Conflict of Law those obiter comments are likely to attract great weight.

== Comment ==
Commentators have indicated that "[t]he case has important implications for the shareholders of the 700,000+ BVI holding companies who could not have expected to face claims in the BVI Court about ownership of shares of the company, where the underlying facts have nothing to do with the BVI", and that the case "clarif[ies] the power of the courts to rectify the share register of a BVI company under section 43(1)(a) of the BVI Business Companies Act 2004."

== See also ==
- United States v. Payner: a similar American case
- British Virgin Islands company law
