= Isle of Man Companies Act 1931–2004 =

The Isle of Man Companies Acts 1931 to 2004, also known as the 1931 Act, is the law under which most Isle of Man Companies are established. It replaced the existing 1865 Isle of Man Companies Act and closely follows a template based on the English Companies Act 1929.

Although the original 1931 Act still contains the majority of the operative provisions, it has been amended and supplemented by various additional Companies Acts and other relevant legislation over the years.

Companies in the Isle of Man can also be formed under the Isle of Man Companies Act 2006 and the Isle of Man Limited Liability Companies Act 1996.

== Introduction ==
As a result of its close relationship to the English Companies Act 1929, the Isle of Man Companies Act 1931-2004 follows the traditional English corporate framework for establishing companies. Companies formed under the 1931 Act can be limited by shares, limited by guarantee, be limited by guarantee and have share capital and have share capital with unlimited liability.

== Background ==
Despite the enactment of the Limited Liability Companies Act 1996 and the Isle of Man Companies Act 2006 - which is both more modern and flexible, the 1931 Act remains the Act of choice for most locally incorporated businesses in the Isle of Man. The principal reason for this is one of cost as unlike the other Manx companies acts the 1931 Act does not require the appointment of a professional Registered Agent who must be licensed by the Isle of Man Financial Services Authority.

== Incorporation ==
In order to incorporate a 1931 Act Company, it is necessary to file an Isle of Man Registry Form 1, a Memorandum of association and Articles of association at the Isle of Man Companies Registry together with the prescribed fee

== General Provisions ==
- Private and Public Companies: 1931 Act companies are designated as either public or private companies. Private companies are not permitted to offer their shares or debentures to the public.
- Corporate Form: 1931 Act Companies can be incorporated as (i) Companies limited by shares, (ii) Companies limited by guarantee, (iii) Companies limited by shares and guarantee, (iv) Unlimited companies with shares or (v) Unlimited Companies without shares
- Company names: 1931 Act companies with private limited liability must have one of the following endings Limited or Ltd and public limited companies must be suffixed with Public Limited Company or PLC
- Registered office: Every Company incorporated under the 1931-2004 Act is required to have its registered office in the Isle of Man.
- Directors: Companies formed under the 1931 Act must have two or more Directors who must be natural persons.
- Secretary: Companies formed under the 1931 Act must appoint a Company Secretary who may be a natural person or a corporate entity.
- Corporate Capacity: The Isle of Man Companies Act 1986 amended the 1931 Act so that companies enjoy “all the rights, powers and privileges of an individual".
- Members: Single member companies permitted. Shares may be issued fractionally. Shares of nil Par value and Bearer shares are not permitted
- Annual General Meetings: Unless dispensed with under relevant regulations, s11 of the Isle of Man Companies Act 1931 requires every 1931 Act Company to hold an Annual general meeting within 15 months of incorporation of the company and then at least every calendar year.
- Offering documents: Requirements relating to offering documents are set out in s34-38 of the Isle of Man Companies Act 1931 . Directors are required to ensure that any Offer fairly and accurately sets out all available material information that the intended recipients would reasonably expect to be included in order to enable them to make an informed decision as to whether or not to accept the Offer.
- Capital Maintenance: There are various categories of non distributable reserves.
- Accounting records: 1931 Act Companies are required to keep reliable accounting records, and to prepare annual financial statements, The detailed requirements are set out in Part 1 of the Companies Act 1982.
- Filing Requirements: There are relatively complex filing requirements for 1931 Act companies. The following information is available on the public record maintained by the Isle of Man Registrar of Companies. This includes, but is not limited to (i) Names and addresses of Directors, (ii) Name and address of Secretary, (iv) Register of members, (v) Returns of allotments (vi) Register of Charges, (vii) Offering documents (viii) Financial Statements (public companies and subsidiaries only).
- Corporate restructuring including transfer of domicile: Isle of Man Companies incorporated under the 1931-2004 Act Companies can re-register under the 2006 Act. Redomiciliation provisions in Manx Law permits foreign companies to be continued as 1931 Act companies in the Isle of Man and 1931 Act companies to redomicile to a foreign jurisdiction.
