= International business company =

Company

An international business company or international business corporation (IBC) is an offshore company formed under the laws of some jurisdictions as a tax neutral company which is usually limited in terms of the activities it may conduct in, but not necessarily from, the jurisdiction in which it is incorporated. While not taxable in the country of incorporation, an IBC or its owners may be taxable in other jurisdictions--if resident in a country having “controlled foreign corporation” rules, for instance.

== Features ==
Characteristics of an IBC vary by jurisdiction, but will usually include:

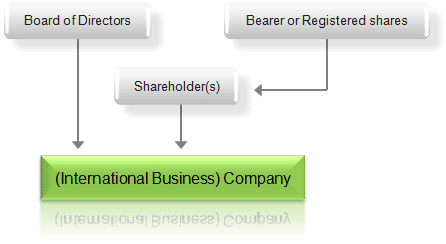
Chart of an offshore company structure

- exemption from local corporate taxation and stamp duty, provided that the company engages in no local business (annual agent's fees and company registration taxes are still payable, which are normally a few hundred U.S. dollars per year)
- preservation of confidentiality of the beneficial owner of the company
- wide corporate powers to engage in different businesses and activities
- abrogation or restriction of the requirement to demonstrate corporate benefit
- the ability to issue shares in either registered or bearer form (although many countries have restricted or eliminated bearer shares now)
- an abrogation of any requirements to appoint local directors or officers
- provision for a local registered agent or registered office

All of the above characteristics are also attributable to many “onshore” countries which have either a residency or territorial based tax system where setting up a company, LLC or LLP in the jurisdiction along with the use of “nominees” will offer all of the above characteristics. US LLCs, UK LLPs and Hong Kong companies are all examples which are widely used in similar capacity to IBCs and which meet all the characteristics above.

However, under pressure from the Organisation for Economic Co-operation and Development (OECD) and the Financial Action Task Force on Money Laundering (FATF), most offshore jurisdictions have removed or are removing the "ring fencing" of IBCs from local taxation. In most of the jurisdictions, this has been accompanied by reductions of levels of corporate tax to zero to avoid damaging the offshore finance industry.

In contrast, Seychelles residents are legally able to own and operate a Seychelles IBC as long as the IBC is not conducting business within Seychelles. Seychelles also has a “territorial” tax system, meaning that Seychelles residents are only taxed on their locally sourced income. Therefore, there is no advantage to non-residents over residents and claims of "ring fencing" have no merit on the Seychelles IBC. This has been, and continues to be, used successfully by Seychelles in defence of the Seychelles IBC vs. international bodies such as the OECD and FATF. Boosting the defence even more is that there are no restrictions on a Seychelles IBC owning shares of a Seychelles domestic company.

Further, most jurisdictions have either eliminated or highly restricted the issuing of bearer shares by IBCs due to international pressures.

== The IBC legal entity ==
An IBC is a legal entity incorporated under specific legislation, which is usually free from all local taxation (except small fixed annual fees). However, in recent years, countries such as Belize have changed their corporate laws in order to adhere to global transparency initiatives such as the Common Reporting Standard (CRS) and the United States version FATCA. Typically, an IBC is limited in its activities it may conduct in and must conduct transactions and business activities outside the boundaries of the country. Though this is generally the rule of thumb, the last decade has seen many changes in corporate laws around the world; as a result, offshore companies and structures in Belize, for instance, are losing their 'offshore' status and are being restructured into the local economy. Anguilla, Bahamas, Belize, Dominica, Nevis, St Vincent and Seychelles have special IBC legislation in place. The British Virgin Islands and Gibraltar formerly had popular IBC regimes, but in each case the relevant legislation has been repealed.

== Typical IBC Uses ==
IBCs are offshore companies that are most commonly used for international business such as trade and non-local services, offshore banking, investment, as a special purpose entity, as well as for asset protection. Offshore companies can be used for virtually any type of transactional activity (some requiring a special license) such as buying and selling goods and services, or holding of physical or digital assets, intellectual property, real estate or for banking and investment accounts.

Both terms Offshore company and an International Business Company (IBC) refer broadly to the same type of corporate structure and are often used interchangeably. They can be distinguished from traditional domestic companies in a number of ways such as business structure, tax obligations, reporting requirements etc. Each country defines and limits the scope of such companies through corporate laws. Most corporate laws in jurisdictions omit the word 'offshore' due to its negative connotations and non-specific character, instead using IBC in reference to companies that engage in non-local activities outside the boundaries of the state. The term 'offshore' is used to refer to a company, or bank account, established outside the jurisdiction of residence or place of doing business.

== See also ==
- International Business Companies Act
- List of company registers
- Multinational corporation
- Offshore bank
