= British Virgin Islands company law =

National economic law

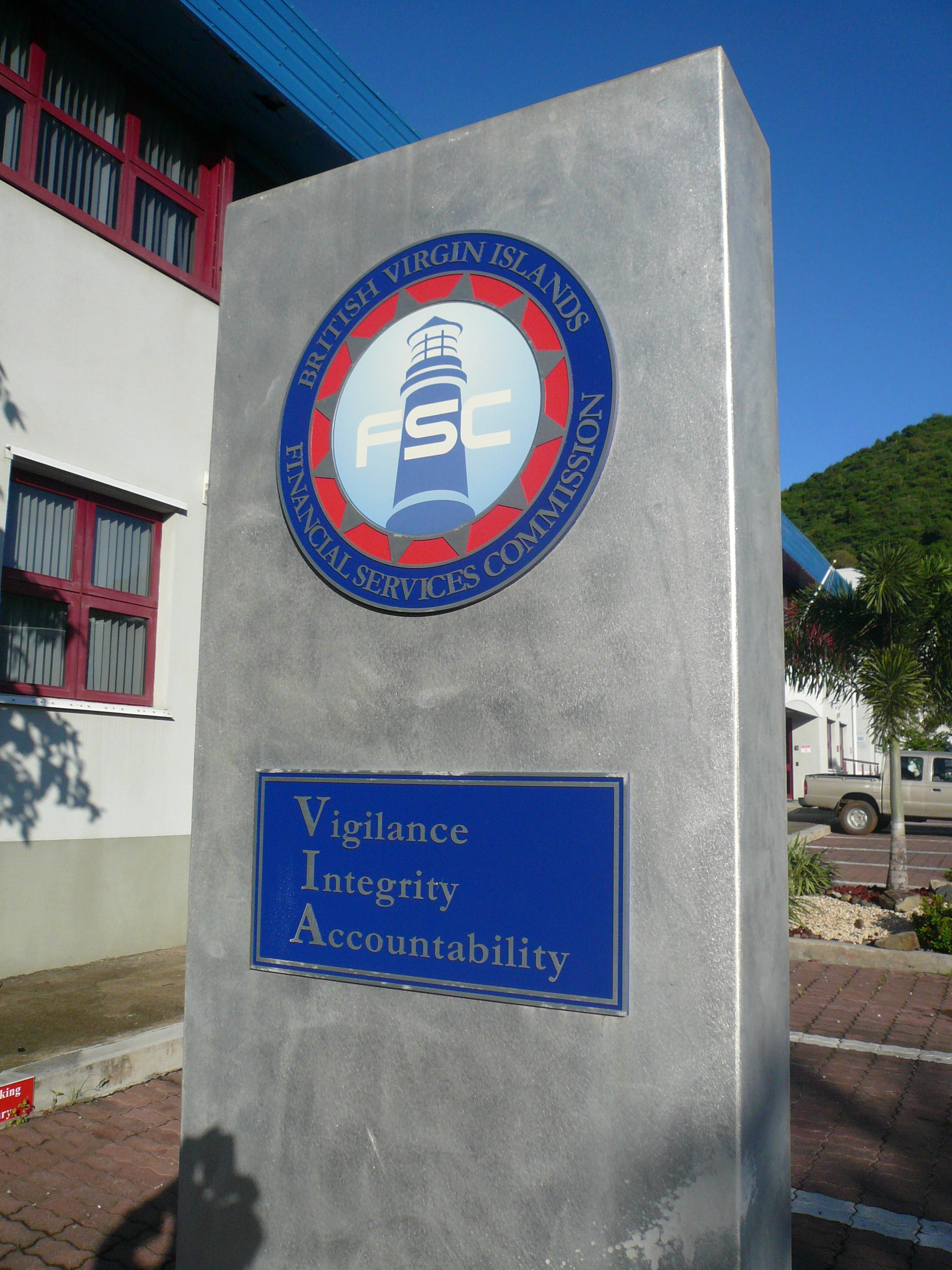
The British Virgin Islands Financial Services Commission has responsibility for oversight of British Virgin Islands companies.

The British Virgin Islands company law is the law that governs businesses registered in the British Virgin Islands. It is primarily codified through the BVI Business Companies Act, 2004, and to a lesser extent by the Insolvency Act, 2003 and by the Securities and Investment Business Act, 2010. The British Virgin Islands has approximately 30 registered companies per head of population, which is likely the highest ratio of any country in the world. Annual company registration fees provide a significant part of Government revenue in the British Virgin Islands, which accounts for the comparative lack of other taxation. This might explain why company law forms a much more prominent part of the law of the British Virgin Islands when compared to countries of similar size.

== History ==
The first companies legislation in the British Virgin Islands was the Companies Act, 1884. However the great leap forward for company law in the jurisdiction occurred in 1984 with the passing of the International Business Companies Act, 1984. That legislation was passed specifically to try and promote the incorporation of offshore companies as a method of economic development in the wake of the cancellation by the U.S. of the double taxation treaty which had existed between the two countries prior to that time. The International Business Companies Act was enormously successful, and resulted in the registration of a large number of companies. However, in the early 2000s the British Virgin Islands came under external pressure to repeal statutes such as the International Business Companies Act which provided for "ring-fenced" taxation (i.e. entities which were exempt from taxation in the British Virgin Islands provided they did not engage in business within the jurisdiction). This led ultimately to the repeal of both the Companies Act and the International Business Companies Act and their replacement with the BVI Business Companies Act, which provided for equal tax treatment of all companies. The change had relatively little impact on incorporation rates as the British Virgin Islands imposes virtually no form of direct taxation.

== Registering a company ==
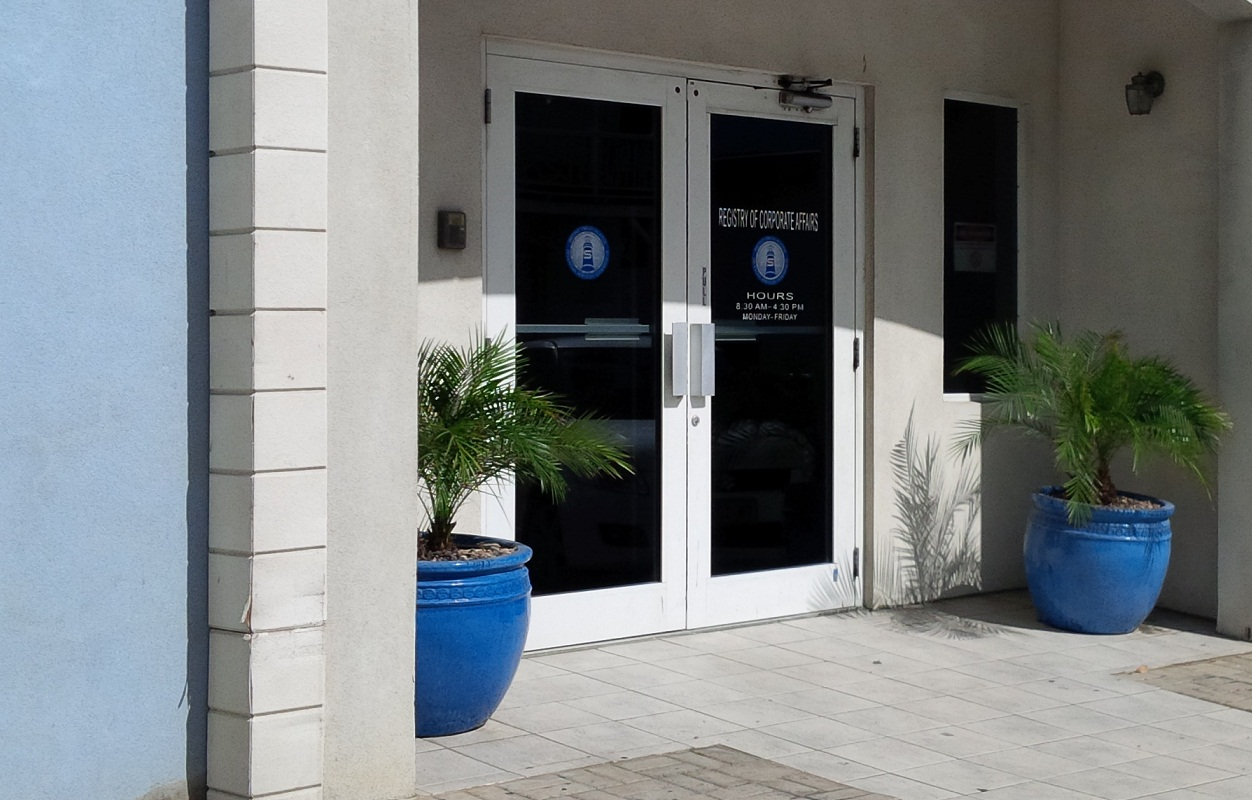
The British Virgin Islands Companies Registry (part of the Registry of Corporate Affairs).

In the British Virgin Islands, only a licensed registered agent can form a company. It is not possible for a member of the public to do so. The principal reason for this is to reinforce anti–money laundering obligations under the Anti-Money Laundering and Terrorist Financing Code of Practice, 2008. Any person who wishes to form a registered company must do so through a licensed agent, and the agent is required (amongst other things) to obtain client due diligence (sometimes referred to as "know your client", or KYC) to comply with the regulations.

Almost all companies formed in the British Virgin Islands are now registered under the BVI Business Companies Act (although a large number of existing companies were originally registered under the International Business Companies Act). In addition there are a small number of statutory corporations, most of which serve some kind of public function. Under the BVI Business Companies Act it is possible to register five broad types of company:

1. Company limited by shares
2. Company limited by guarantee and not authorised to issue shares
3. Company limited by guarantee and authorised to issue shares
4. Unlimited company authorised to issue shares
5. Unlimited company not authorised to issue shares

In practice the vast majority of companies are registered as companies limited by shares.

Furthermore, when registering a company, the company may also further be registered specifically as:

1. Segregated portfolio company
2. Restricted purpose company

A segregated portfolio company is a company that segregates the assets and liabilities of different classes of shares from each other and from the general assets of the company. All segregated portfolio companies are required to include the designation "(SPC)" within their name, and must comply with the Segregated Portfolio Company Regulations, 2005. A restricted purpose company is a special type of company intended for use in bankruptcy remote bond issues, and which only has limited corporate capacity to undertake certain specific purposes.

Slightly unusually, in the British Virgin Islands the formation of a company does not involve the issuing of subscriber shares. Accordingly, when a company is incorporated it initially has no members. The registered agent has a statutory power to appoint the first directors of the company, and the first directors can then receive subscriptions and issue shares. However, until the first shares are issued the directors are personally liable for anything which they do in the name of the company.

BVI enjoys 0% Taxation, no auditing and no paid up capital requirement. With over half its income coming from the licensing of offshore companies and related services, the BVI is a significant global player in the offshore financial services industry. Once frequently labelled as a "tax haven", the territory has fought hard against the label in recent years, signing the Multilateral Convention on Mutual Assistance in Tax Matters in June 2013. Re-positioning itself as a responsible international financial centre and tax planning destination, the BVI has turned its attention to Asia-based clients.

== Corporate personality ==
In the British Virgin Islands a company has separate legal personality from its members (unlike, for example, a partnership registered under the Partnership Act, 1996). The liability of the members of a company is limited to their shares or the amount of their guarantee. Similarly, directors or officers of a company are not normally liable for the company's debts except insofar as they may otherwise be liable for their own conduct or actions. The primary circumstances where liability may be imposed upon directors in relation to their acts as directors are (1) where the company has no members, (2) where a person acts as a director despite being disqualified, (3) where the director authorises payment of an unlawful distribution which cannot be recovered, (4) where the director is guilty of trading whilst insolvent, misfeasance or fraudulent trading, or (5) where the director undertakes personal responsibility or liability for certain actions.

Conversely, the assets of a company are regarded as belonging solely to the company and not the company's members. In exception circumstances the courts are prepared to "pierce the corporate veil" and treat the assets of the company as belonging to the members (or, conversely, treat the company's obligations as the obligations of the members), but the circumstances in which this will be done are rare and exceptional.

== Corporate constitution ==
The corporate constitution of a private company registered under the BVI Business Companies Act consists of the memorandum and articles of association. Although these are technically two separate documents, and the companies legislation contains detailed provisions at various points as to what provisions should appear in the memorandum and which should appear in the articles, for all intents and purposes the documents are co-joined and filed as a single continuous document.

The memorandum and articles of association of a company are available for public inspection at the Companies Registry. The memorandum and articles of association can normally be amended by a simple resolution of the members and usually (subject to certain minor limitations) by a resolution of directors, although some companies include restrictions on this process within their corporate constitution.

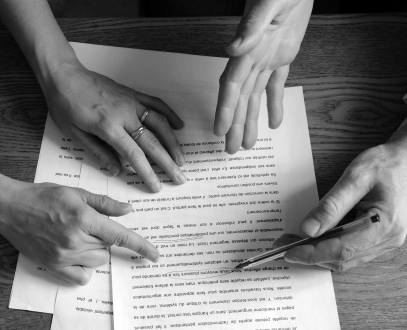
The company's memorandum and articles may be supplemented by a shareholders' agreement.

Any amendment to the memorandum or articles normally only becomes effective when filed at the Companies Registry. In exceptional circumstances the court has power to order that an amendment should take effect at an earlier date (but not earlier than the date of the actual resolution which was passed approving the amendment).

Where the company is formed as a joint venture between two or more parties, or where there is a private equity investor, it is quite common for a company's constitutional arrangements to also be regulated under a shareholders' agreement. However shareholders' agreements are not publicly filed in the British Virgin Islands. Furthermore, various matters are required by law to be regulated in the memorandum of association of the company, irrespective of the provision of any shareholders' agreement.

Statutory corporations do not have constitutional documents in the same sense that private companies do. In practice their constitution usually comprises the statute or charter, together with the internal by-laws of the company. In some cases the by-laws are issued by way of subsidiary legislation.

== Corporate governance ==
The business and affairs of a British Virgin Islands company are managed by its board of directors. The board must consist of one or more persons, and these may be individuals or companies. Directors owe strict duties of good faith to exercise their powers for a proper purpose and in the best interests of the company. In relative terms, directors are comparatively powerful under British Virgin Islands law. In most cases directors can appoint further directors and amend the company's constitution. There are extremely few matters of corporate governance whereby the board is required to obtain the approval of the company's members.

The members of the company are legally the owners of the company. Although they do not have the power to dictate to the directors how the company should be managed, they have the power to appoint and remove the board, and through this power exercise indirect control. Resolutions may be passed by the members formally or informally pursuant to the Duomatic principle. Members typically operate by a simple majority vote (there being no statutory concept of "special resolutions" in British Virgin Islands law any more), although there are special statutory provisions to protect minority shareholders against "unfair prejudice" on the part of majority shareholders, and this is largely based upon unfair prejudice in United Kingdom company law.

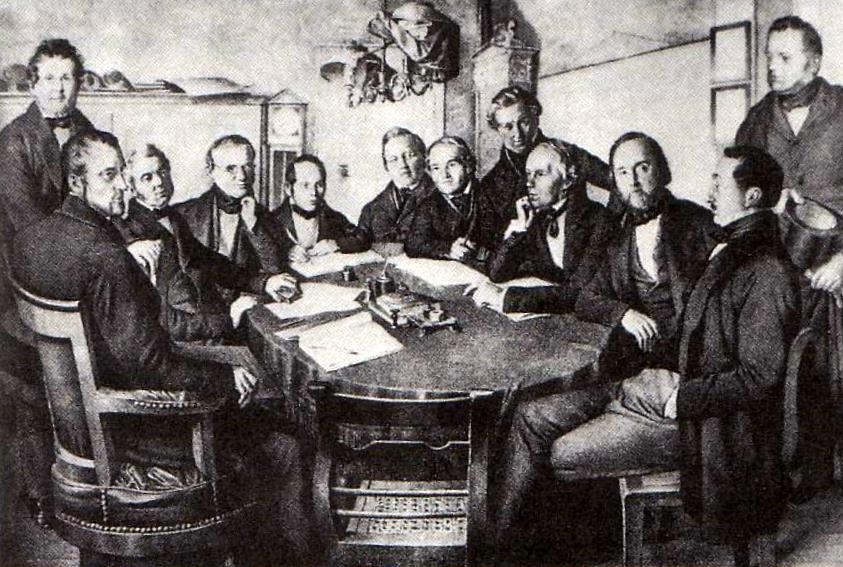
A board of directors may pass resolutions at a meeting (pictured) or by way of circular written resolutions.

The directors owe their duties to the company itself, and not to the individual members. Accordingly, where a director acts in breach of their duty, then the proper claimant in any action is the company itself. If the company is unable to take any action (because it is controlled by the wrongdoer) the court may authorise a member to bring proceedings in the name of the company by way of derivative action. However the measure of damages will be the loss to the company, and only the loss to the company. A shareholder cannot sue a person for a wrong committed against the company for the "reflective loss" to the value of their shareholding, as this would result in the wrongdoer paying double compensation for the same wrong (once to the company and once to the shareholders).

The emphasis of British Virgin Islands company law is to protect the rights of creditors and members (i.e. the sources of capital) as the key stakeholders in the company. The rights of other stakeholders, such as employees, customers and wider society are given comparatively little protection. This reflects the offshore nature of most British Virgin Islands companies, and the different social and economic environments in which they operate.

At present there is no securities regulation in relation to public issuance of securities in the British Virgin Islands. Although Part II of the Securities and Investment Business Act, 2010 purports to regulate public issues of securities, this Part has not yet been brought into force (nor has Part V, dealing with market abuse).

Companies in the British Virgin Islands are subject to various statutory record keeping obligations. However, with a few exceptions, there is limited public access to corporate records.

== Shares and shareholders ==
Although British Virgin Islands companies can be formed without the power to issue shares, in practice almost all companies are registered as share issuing companies. It is sometimes said - misleadingly - that the British Virgin Islands has abolished the concept of share capital. This is based upon the removal of the requirement to state an authorised capital in a company's constitutional documents (instead a company only needs to state the maximum number of shares it is authorised to issue), combined with the abrogation of capital maintenance rules (in the British Virgin Islands so long as a company remains solvent after the distribution, it can distribute money or other assets back to its shareholders by way of dividend or share redemptions). That power does not, however, remove the requirement to account for the share capital in the company's books of account. Furthermore, various other British Virgin Islands statutes require companies conducting certain types of business to maintain certain levels of share capital.

The approach to share capital in the British Virgin Islands is extremely flexible, and this reflects the desire to maintain the appeal of companies formed in the jurisdiction for finance transactions. Some of those features include:

- Validation of companies providing financial assistance for the acquisition of their own shares
- Absence of capital maintenance rules in relation to dividends and distributions
- Power to hold treasury shares
- Absence of thin capitalisation rules

Shareholders in a British Virgin Islands company do not enjoy statutory pre-emption rights or rights of first refusal in relation to new issuances or sales of shares. Although companies may opt into a statutory pre-emption scheme provided for under the legislation, in practice relatively few companies do so. Companies may provide for bespoke provisions relating to such rights in their constitutional documents, and this will sometimes occur in joint ventures or where preferred shareholders invest in the company.

Shareholder voting in the British Virgin Islands is still predicated by the normal basis of majority-control. However, where the majority exercises their power in a way which is unfairly prejudicial to the minority shareholders, the court may give relief to the minority shareholders. However, the minority shareholders will need to satisfy the court that the conduct of the majority was unfair - simply exercising their votes to overrule the minority is not unfair in and of itself. The court also has power to order that a minority shareholder may bring proceedings on behalf of the company against a party whom the company has claims against where the wrongdoers are effectively in control of the company and refuse to take action.

British Virgin Islands companies still technically have the power to issue bearer shares where their constitutional documents so provide. However, bearer shares have become so circumscribed that they are rarely seen in practice. Companies which issue bearer shares are subject to punitive increased licence fees, and all bearer shares are required to be held by licensed custodians ("de-materialised" in the parlance of the statute) and so operate in much the same way as registered shares in any event. Bearer shares which are not deposited with a licensed custodian are disabled by law, and cannot vote or receive distributions.

== Debt finance ==
British Virgin Islands companies are often capitalised primarily with debt rather than equity, whether it is by way of intra-group debt or external borrowing. Companies are not required to file financing statements in the British Virgin Islands when borrowing money.

Where a creditor takes security from a company for the indebtedness, that security can be registered against the company in the register of registered charges maintained by the Registrar of Companies. The process is relatively quick and cheap; it can be done online, and the filing fee is US$100. Once registered, the security will take priority over all subsequently registered security and any unregistered security. Registration of a security interest will also constitute constructive notice of the security interest.

British Virgin Islands companies may give financial assistance for the acquisition of their own shares without the requirement of going through a "whitewash" procedure.

== Reorganisation and restructuring ==
There are a number of statutory provisions whereby companies registered in the British Virgin Islands may reorganise themselves, either pursuant to a general group reorganisation, or as part of a debt restructuring, or in order to complete an M&A transaction.

- Mergers and consolidation. Two or more companies can either merge or consolidate by statute into a single successor company, and the successor company will succeed to the assets of all of the constituent companies and be subject to all of the liabilities and obligations of the constituent companies. In a merger, the successor company is one of the original companies which merged. In a consolidation all of the constituent companies are merged into one new company which did not exist prior to the consolidation. After the merger or consolidation is completed the non-surviving companies are struck-off and cease to exist.
- Continuation. Although not so much a reorganisational process in its own right, companies registered in the British Virgin Islands are able to redomicile to (or, in the words of the statute, "continue their existence under the laws of") any other jurisdiction which permits companies to change their jurisdiction of registration. Similarly, companies are entitled to migrate to the British Virgin Islands from other jurisdictions where those other jurisdictions permit this.
- Schemes of arrangement. Companies may enter into a scheme of arrangement whereby the court sanctions a compromise or arrangement which is entered into by the members or creditors of a company. The scheme must be approved by a majority in number and 75% in value. Where the scheme members or scheme creditors have different interests, the court may be order that they be divided into two or more classes for the purposes of voting on the scheme. Schemes were introduced into British Virgin Islands law to copy similar provisions available under Cayman Islands law, but have not proved particularly popular in the British Virgin Islands, probably because of the availability of a range of other restructuring options which do not require the time and expense of court approval. Most of the schemes which have been implemented in the jurisdiction to date relate to reverse takeovers of publicly listed British Virgin Islands companies.
- Plans of arrangement. Separately from schemes of arrangement, British Virgin Islands law provides for one or more companies to enter into plans of arrangement which can allow multiple different reorganisational steps to be concluded contemporaneously. These steps may include the merger of two or more companies, the separation out of a business line from a company, the liquidation or dissolution of a company, the merger or consolidation of two or more companies, the amendment of the constitutional documents of a company, any transfer of company assets or shares issued by a company, or any other "reorganisation or reconstruction" of a company.
- Creditors' arrangement. Under the Insolvency Act the creditors of a company enter into a creditor's arrangement to compromise their debts against the company. The effect is similar to a company voluntary arrangement under English law. The arrangement must be approved by creditors holding 75% of the value of the company's debt who were present and voting at the meeting. A creditor's arrangement cannot affect the rights of a secured creditor or preferential creditor without their consent.
- Minority squeeze-out. Shareholders holding in aggregate 90% of the issued shares in a British Virgin Islands company may direct the company to compulsorily acquire the shares of the remaining minority shareholders. The statutory provisions may be varied or abrogated in the company's constitutional documents, although in practice this is rarely done.

== Insolvency ==
British Virgin Islands insolvency law is almost entirely codified in the Insolvency Act, 2003 and the Insolvency Rules, 2005. The Insolvency Act is "predicated heavily towards the protection of secured creditors' rights". In the British Virgin Islands a company will be deemed to be insolvent if it cash flow insolvent, balance sheet insolvent or "technically" insolvent (i.e. it has failed to satisfy a judgment debt or statutory demand letter). In each of those circumstances a creditor to petition the court for the appointment of a liquidator. A company may also voluntarily enter insolvent liquidation by a vote approved by 75% of the votes of the company's members.

If a liquidator is appointed (either voluntarily or by the court), the liquidator's primary duty is to collect in all of the company's assets and then distribute them pari passu to the company's creditors. The Insolvency Act confers wide powers upon the liquidator to enable him to do so. Once a liquidator is appointed, unsecured creditors cannot commence legal proceedings against the insolvent company without the leave of the court and any rights of action against the company are converted into claims in the liquidation process.

Secured creditors generally do not participate in the liquidation process, and may continue to proceed with any enforcement action directly against their collateral pursuant to a valid security interest. A liquidator has a right to disclaim onerous property and unprofitable contracts (although this cannot destroy or remove any third party rights once they have vested). British Virgin Islands law only provides for a very small class of preferential creditor, and these are rarely commercially significant in insolvent liquidations.

When a company goes into insolvent liquidation, any mutual debts between the company and a creditor intending to prove in the liquidation will be set-off. However, the right of set-off is not mandatory, and can be waived by a creditor provided this does not prejudice other creditors. Any creditor who extended credit to the company at a time when it had notice of the company's insolvency (excluding balance sheet insolvency for these purposes) cannot set-off. The Insolvency Act has incorporated ISDA Model Netting legislation (pre-2007 form) and so any netting agreement relating to financial contracts will prevail over the statutory insolvency set-off provisions.

A liquidator may challenge transactions entered into in the twilight period prior to insolvency where such transactions constitute either an unfair preference, undervalue transaction, voidable floating charge or extortionate credit transaction. A liquidator can also pursue former directors (including shadow or de facto directors) and officers of the company for either misfeasance or insolvent trading.

The Insolvency Act also regulates receiverships, including administrative receiverships. Under British Virgin Islands law it is possible to appoint an administrative receiver pursuant to a floating charge over all or substantially all of a company's assets and undertaking.

The insolvency regime in the British Virgin Islands does not really provide for any form of debtor in possession rehabilitation. Although the Insolvency Act also makes provision for administration orders, these provisions have not yet been brought into force. It is also possible for an insolvent company to enter into a creditor's arrangement under a supervisor, and thereby restructure the company's debts. Such arrangements cannot affect the rights of secured creditors or preferential creditors without their consent, and require the consent of 75% of creditors by value and a majority in number.

In order to act as a liquidator in an insolvent liquidation, administrative receiver (but not a simple receiver), supervisor of an arrangement or administrator (if administration is ever brought into force) a person must be a licensed insolvency practitioner. A practitioner must be resident in the British Virgin Islands to obtain a licence. However, it is possible for a foreign insolvency practitioner to be appointed jointly with the British Virgin Islands resident licensed insolvency practitioner.

== Financial services regulation ==
Financial services are regulated in the British Virgin Islands by the Financial Services Commission (or FSC), an independent regulator. Unusually, the entire Companies Registry in the British Virgin Islands falls under the purview of the FSC. The FSC's ambit also extends to companies (and any other entities) which are engaged in regulated business. The principal types of business which are regulated are:

1. Investment funds
2. Investment business, including:
  1. dealing in investments
  2. arranging deals in investments
  3. managing investments
  4. providing investment advice
3. Insurance
4. Banking
5. Financing and money services
6. Trust companies
7. Company management

Most regulated business in the British Virgin Islands is regulated if it is conducted "in or from within" the jurisdiction. Accordingly, if a British Virgin Islands is incorporated to provide investment advice in Malaysia, it would still be regulated in the British Virgin Islands because it is providing regulated services "from within" the jurisdiction.

== See also ==
- List of company registers
