= Desertification and land restoration rate in Ghana =

Environmental issue in Ghana

The majority of Ghana's income and jobs are produced directly and indirectly by the land, which is a vital resource for our nation's prosperity. It sustains the provision of ecosystem services as well as the agricultural, forestry, and fishing livelihoods of the vast majority of people, particularly those living in rural areas. Despite these advantages, there are a number of temporal and spatial factors contributing to the degradation of our land resources, such as deforestation, erosion, declining soil fertility and productivity, deterioration of rangelands, desertification, and deterioration of water bodies (quantity and quality).

Ghana's drylands in the northern Sudanese and Guinea savannah regions are especially at risk from erosion; in these areas, land deterioration is known as "desertification." The risk of desertification is present on about 35% of Ghana's land. An estimated $1.4 billion, or 6% of Ghana's GDP, is lost to land degradation each year in the country.

== Desertification ==
=== The Challenges of Desertification in Ghana ===
Due to the country's geographic location and unsustainable exploitation of its natural resources, desertification is becoming a major economic, social, and environmental concern in Ghana. Ghana, which is located in the Sahel region of West Africa, has an arid and semi-arid climate, which makes it especially vulnerable to desertification and the negative consequences of climate change. These environmental problems are further made worse by population pressure. According to UN reports from 2019, Ghana's expanding population is placing more stress on the country's agricultural areas, which is causing pesticide use to rise and massive deforestation to satisfy the country's population needs. As a result, there has been a significant decline in woods in northern Ghana, a trend that is happening at an alarming rate. Furthermore, wildfires and overgrazing are major contributors to the issue.

Over the past 20 years, Ghana's land degradation has increased substantially, with the northern and central regions experiencing the most severe deterioration. It is estimated that "severe to very severe" erosion affects 70% of Ghana. The rates of soil erosion in the Upper West, Northern, Brong Ahafo, and Upper East Regions are high, and between 2000 and 2016, there was a notable decline in Net Primary Productivity (NPP), a gauge of the health of the vegetation. Apart from the northern areas, there is significant soil erosion in the upper Volta Region, Brong Ahafo, and Accra. This erosion is made worse by poor urban planning in Accra, which has compromised the integrity of the soil. An estimate of the financial cost of soil erosion places it at US$0.54 billion, or 0.9% of Ghana's GDP.

=== Factors contributing to desertification in Ghana ===
- In Ghana, there are several factors contributing to desertification, but deforestation is the main one. In order to achieve agricultural and commercial goals, this entails cutting down trees, which exposes the soil and destroys vegetation that prevents desertification. Ghana has lost a significant amount of its forest cover throughout time, mostly as a result of mining operations, logging for lumber, and the conversion of forests to agricultural land. Natural forest clearing is required by these processes, which results in the loss of avian and other terrestrial species' habitats, the annihilation of plant life, and disturbances to the biodiversity of the area. In Ghana, deforestation is mostly done for commercial benefit, frequently with little consideration for the effects on the environment. In addition, the growth of human populations associated with urbanization leads to the devastation of forest vegetation to provide space for infrastructure and houses. Consequently, deforestation, largely driven by human activities, has played a significant role in the desertification of Ghana.
- Climate change is a significant contributor to desertification in Ghana. The country is especially susceptible since it relies heavily on rain-fed agriculture and has inadequate capacity for mitigation and adaptation. Climate change has had a negative influence on the environment, the economy, and society as a whole. Rising temperatures, a critical result of climate change, have played a significant role in advancing desertification in Ghana. Climate change is causing temperatures in Ghana to rise steadily, which has decreased crop yields and, in particular, fostered the spread of the desert, increased evaporation, and an increase in the demand for water. Ghana is likewise being affected by the shifting patterns of rainfall, which has increased the frequency of droughts and floods and harmed infrastructure and agriculture. It is impossible to overstate how bad things will be for subsistence farmers. The loss of biodiversity is another effect of climate change that is causing Ghana to become more decertified. With the changing climate and patterns of rainfall, a large number of plant and animal species face extinction. Every day, many different species experience the loss of their habitats, which has a detrimental effect on the food chain and causes the deaths of those that are unable to survive. It is impossible to overlook how climate change is affecting Ghana's health. Ghana is experiencing significant health effects from climate change, including a rise in heatstroke, malaria, and other illnesses linked to rising temperatures and altered rainfall patterns. Livestock owned by farmers is also impacted. As per the World Health Organization's report in 2015, Ghana's climate change is anticipated to worsen pre-existing problems like food insecurity, poverty, and infectious and vector-borne illnesses.
- Overgrazing is one of the main causes of Ghana's desertification. Animals graze excessively on this terrain, which degrades the soil, causes vegetation to disappear, and creates other environmental problems. Overgrazing has grown to be a significant issue in Ghana, especially in the northern areas where pastoralist people have historically relied on grazing as a source of income. Sedentary grazing and animal overstocking have replaced traditional rotational grazing and mobility due to population growth and rising demand for livestock products. This change has caused a considerable decrease in the amount of plant cover and serious degradation of grazing pastures. Overgrazing has adverse impacts. It damages the ecosystem and fuels climate change by causing soil erosion, degrading water resources (such as rivers, streams, and the water table), and destroying biodiversity.
- Ghana's problems with desertification have also been compounded by unsustainable agricultural practices. Ghana's economy heavily depends on the agricultural sector, which will employ more than half of the workforce and generate 20% of the nation's GDP in 2022. Unsustainable farming methods, however, are negatively affecting both the environment and the livelihoods of the farmers who use them. Among these agricultural practices that are not sustainable are: Deforestation: Ghana's trees are being cut down for agriculture, leaving the ground naked and causing erosion and a decline in biodiversity. These places are particularly sensitive to the effects of climate change because of their outside environment. Reduced soil fertility, crop yields, and soil degradation are all consequences of intensive agricultural techniques such as monoculture, high fertilizer and pesticide use, and sedentary overgrazing. When agrochemicals are used excessively in farming, neighboring water sources can become contaminated, endangering the health of people and animals. With soil erosion and desertification affecting more than 20% of the country's land, land degradation is a severe problem in Ghana. The most desert-prone territory in Ghana is the Bawku Region in the north.
