= Milton Manor =

Milton Manor (also Middleton in the 13th century) is a manor house in the parish of Brading on the Isle of Wight, in England.

== History ==
Milton was held with land in Adgestone, of the manor of Appleford for the service of half a knight's fee. The manor was given by Queen Eleanor in 1280 to John de Weston and Christina his wife. John died seised of it in 1323–4, when his son John succeeded. On his death in 1344 the manor passed to his brother William, a clerk in holy orders. In 1346 Katherine de Weston held the manor, and in 1354 Thomas de Weston died seised of it, leaving as his heirs his daughter Eleanor wife of Sir John de Rattlesden, his granddaughters Eleanor and Isabel daughters of another daughter Margaret and his grandson Roger, son of another daughter Isabel. The eldest co-heir Eleanor is perhaps to be identified with Eleanor wife of Sir William Bouchier, kt., who died seised of a quarter fee in Milton in 1397. Her heir was her son William, but John Haket was holding the estate at the end of the 14th century, and was returned for aid in 1428 as holding the de Weston half fee with Henry Howles, the latter being succeeded in the joint holding three years later by John Roucle or Rookley.

In the 15th century the manor seems to have been split up into East and West Milton. East Middleton, the Hakets' portion of the manor, passed with Wolverton, with which it evidently became merged, as the joint holding was known as Wolverton alias Milton from the end of the 16th century onwards. West Milton apparently passed with East Standen to Joan Cooke, who leased it in 1514 to William Howles. The lease, and apparently later the tenancy, of the manor came like East Standen into the hands of the Meux and Bannister families, and in 1573 William Meux sold two parts of West Milton to John Worsley of Appuldurcombe, the remaining third being sold by Sir Edward Bannister in 1616 to Sir Richard Worsley. West Milton thus became united with East Milton, and subsequently followed its descent.
