= Michael Riegels =

British Virgin Islands lawyer

Michael D. Riegels, KC
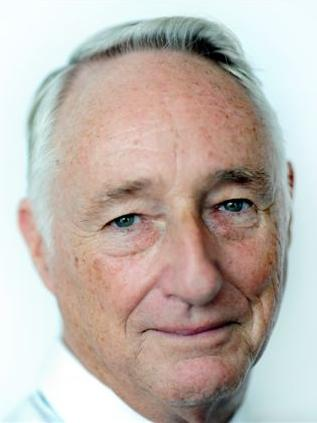
- Michael Riegels
- Born: 20 March 1938 (age 88); Tanga, Tanganyika
- Education: Pembroke College, Oxford
- Occupation: Barrister
- Spouse: Norma Riegels
- Children: 3

Michael Riegels KC (pronounced /riːɡʌlz/; born 20 March 1938) was the inaugural chairman of the Financial Services Commission of the British Virgin Islands. He is a qualified barrister and was formerly the senior partner of Harneys from 1984 to 1997, and he also served the president of the BVI Bar Association from 1996 to 1998 and as president of the British Virgin Islands branch of the Red Cross.

== Career ==
Riegels was also part of the "gang of five" who drafted the original International Business Companies Act in 1984, the principal statute of the BVI's offshore finance industry for many years (and subsequently copied by a large number of competing offshore jurisdictions).

In 1999, he was appointed by the Government as chairman of a public inquiry in relation to the escape of certain Colombian prisoners who were on remand awaiting trial for charges relating to drug trafficking.

== Background ==
He was born in Tanga, Tanganyika (later part of Tanzania) in 1938 and educated at Prince of Wales School in Nairobi, Kenya and Oxford University where he won a full blue for athletics. He was admitted to the Bar of England and Wales in 1961 as a member of Gray's Inn, and to the Bar of the British Virgin Islands in 1973. He was one of the founding members of the BVI Bar Association in 1977.
