= Harney Westwood & Riegels =

Global offshore law firm

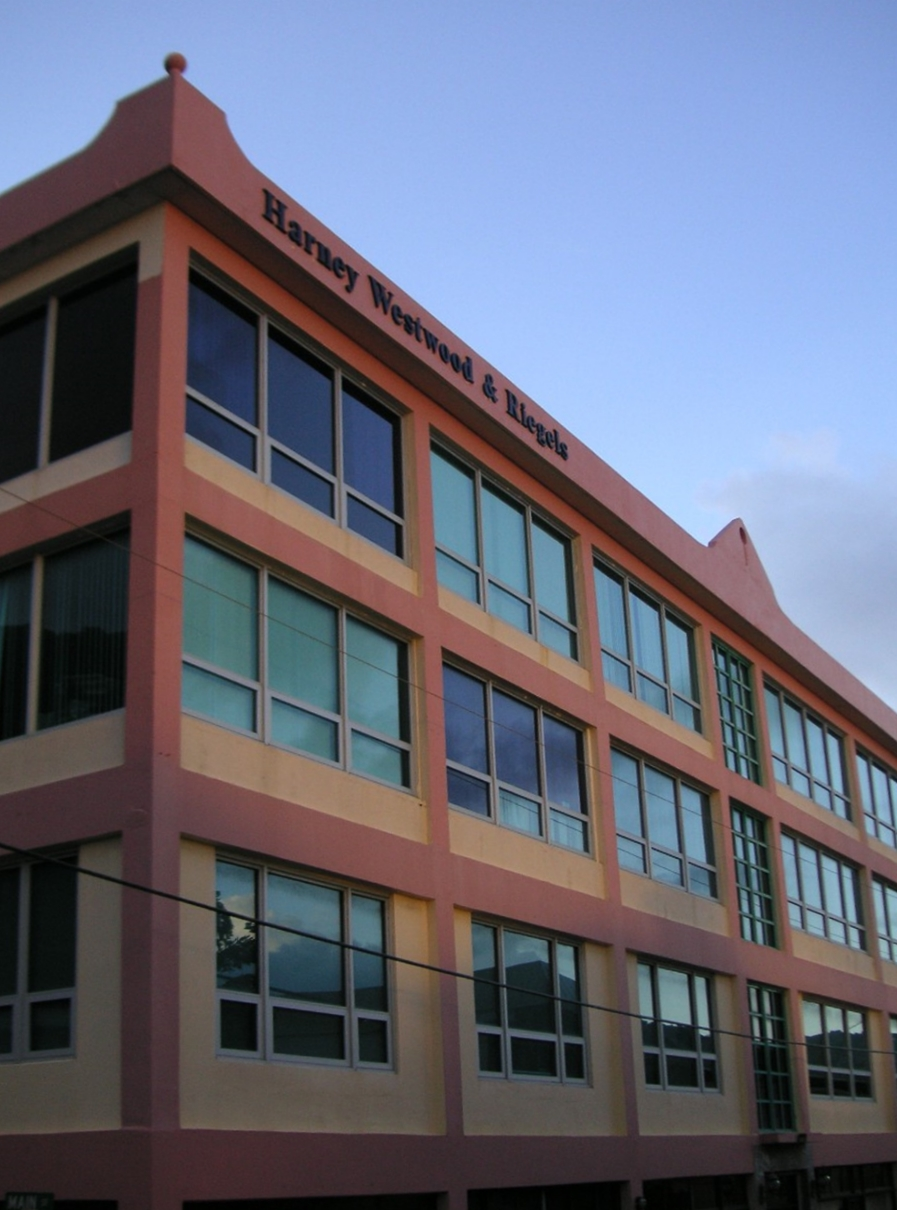
Head offices of Harney Westwood & Riegels.

Harney Westwood & Riegels (or Harneys) is a global offshore law firm that provides advice on British Virgin Islands, Cayman Islands, Cyprus, Luxembourg, Bermuda, Anguilla, and Jersey law to an international client base that includes law firms, financial institutions, investment funds, and private individuals. They have locations in major financial centers across Europe, Asia, America and Caribbean.

In 2016 Harneys was named Offshore Law Firm of the Year by The Lawyer in its annual awards.

== History ==
Harneys was established in 1960 by Harold Harney. Along with its affiliated fiduciary services business, Harneys is the second-largest private employer in the BVI.

In its early days, Harold Harney founded the first resident legal practice firm in the BVI, later joined by Neville Westwood in 1967 and Michael Riegels in 1973.

William Peake is the firm’s global managing partner and is based in the London office.

Notable alumni of Harneys include:

- Michael Riegels QC, inaugural chairman of the British Virgin Islands Financial Services Commission
- Dame Janice Pereira, the current Chief Justice of the Eastern Caribbean Supreme Court
- Lewis Hunte QC, former Attorney General of the British Virgin Islands
- Tamia Richards, senior Magistrate in the British Virgin Islands.
- Myron Walwyn, British Virgin Islands Minister of Government worked at Harneys as a summer intern whilst studying law.

The firm has worked with the government of the BVI over the years in relation to the development of the offshore finance industry in the Territory. Three of the partners of the firm formed part of the "gang of five" that drafted the original International Business Companies Act, and members of the firm were also closely involved in the drafting of subsequent key legislation, including the Insolvency Act 2003, the BVI Business Companies Act 2004 and the Securities and Investment Business Act 2010.

=== Managing Partners ===
- Richard Peters (-2001-2010-)
- William Peake (-2026-)

== Offices ==
The firm expanded with new offices for several years, followed by a surge of five new offices in two years in 2014–2015. The first new office was opened in Anguilla (1998)*, followed by London (2002), Hong Kong (2005), the Cayman Islands (2008), Cyprus (2009), Montevideo (2010)*, Singapore (2014), Vancouver (2014) - now closed, Shanghai (2015), Tokyo (2015) - now closed, Bermuda 2015, Luxembourg (2019), and Jersey (2025). In 2013 the firm entered into an alliance with BLC Chambers in Mauritius to give it Mauritius legal capability - now closed.

- Harneys no longer maintains a physical office in Anguilla; however, they have several Anguilla-qualified lawyers in its BVI, London, and other offices. It's Montevideo office is now solely run by the firm's strategic alliance partner Harneys Fiduciary.

== Practice ==
Harneys’ offering spans transactional, contentious, and private client disciplines. The firm’s nine main practice areas are Banking & Finance, Corporate, Digital Assets & Blockchain, International Arbitration, Investment Funds, Litigation & Insolvency, Private Wealth, Regulatory & Tax, and Restructuring.

Partners at Harneys wrote the first, and to date only, legal textbook on British Virgin Islands law: British Virgin Islands Commercial Law, published by Sweet & Maxwell.

Harneys is one of only two law firms in the world (the other being Allen & Overy) which provides official opinions to ISDA on close-out netting analysis for three or more different jurisdictions (BVI, Anguilla, and Cyprus).

== Rankings ==
Harneys is ranked in most jurisdictions where it practices (normally in Band 1) various international legal directories. As of 2014, Harney's ratings include:

Harneys Legal Directory Rankings (2014)
Jurisdiction	Practice Area	Ranking/Position
Chambers Global
Anguilla	General Business Law	Band 1
British Virgin Islands	Financial & Corporate	Band 1
British Virgin Islands	Dispute Resolution	Band 1
Cayman Islands	Financial & Corporate	Band 4
Cayman Islands	Dispute Resolution	Band 3
Cyprus	Corporate / Commercial	Band 2
Mauritius	General Business Law	Band 1
IFLR 1000
British Virgin Islands	Financial & Corporate	Tier 1
British Virgin Islands	Investment Funds	Tier 1
Cayman Islands	Financial & Corporate	Tier 4
Cayman Islands	Investment Funds	Tier 3
Mauritius	Financial & Corporate	Tier 1
Legal 500
Anguilla	General	No rankings
British Virgin Islands	Corporate & Commercial	Tier 1
British Virgin Islands	Dispute Resolution	Tier 1
Cayman Islands	Corporate & Commercial	Tier 3
Cayman Islands	Corporate & Commercial	Tier 3
Cyprus	Banking and Finance	Tier 2
Cyprus	Corporate and M&A	Tier 2
Mauritius	General	No rankings
