= Situs (law) =

Location of property for the purpose of determining applicable law

In law, the situs (Latin for 'position'; pronounced /ˈsaɪtəs/ in English) of property is where the property is treated as being located for legal purposes. This may be important when determining which laws apply to the property, since the situs of an object determines the lex situs, that is, the law applicable in the jurisdiction where the object is located, which may differ from the lex fori, the law applicable in the jurisdiction where a legal action is brought. For example, real estate in England is subject to English law, real estate in Scotland is subject to Scottish law, and real estate in France is subject to French law.

It can be essential to determine the situs of an object, and the lex situs, because there are substantial differences between the laws in different jurisdictions governing, for example: whether property has been transferred effectively; what taxes apply (such as inheritance tax, estate tax, wealth tax, income tax and capital gains tax); and whether rules of intestacy or forced heirship apply.

The rules for determining situs vary between jurisdictions and can depend on the context. The English common law rules, which apply in most common law jurisdictions, are in outline as follows:

- the situs of real estate (land) is where it is located.
- the situs of a chattel (tangible moveable item) is the state where the chattel is [or was located] at the time of conveyance.
- the situs of a bearer instrument is where the document is located, but the situs of a registered instrument is where the register is held.
- the situs of debts is where the debtor resides, since that is generally where legal action can be taken to enforce the debt.
- the situs of intangible property, including intellectual property and goodwill, is where the property is registered, or, if not registered, where the rights to the property can be enforced.
- the situs of a ship within territorial waters is where it is located, but the situs of a ship in international waters is its port of registry.
