= Barry Leon =

ECSC Commercial Court Judge
- In office 2015–2018
- Monarch: Elizabeth II

Personal details
- Education: University of Toronto (LLB); Ivey Business School, University of Western Ontario (MBA); University of Alberta (BA)
- Occupation: Judge and arbitrator
- Profession: Lawyer

Barry Leon is a former Commercial Court Judge of the Eastern Caribbean Supreme Court based in the British Virgin Islands. He was appointed in 2015 to succeed Edward Bannister, QC upon his retirement. He was the first ever Canadian to hold the post. Prior to his appointment he was a lawyer practising in Canada where he was a partner and head of the international arbitration group at Perley-Robertson, Hill and McDougall. Since retiring as a judge in 2018 Mr Leon has practised as an arbitrator and mediator.

== Offices ==
Legal offices
Preceded by Edward Bannister	Eastern Caribbean Supreme Court; Senior Commercial Court Judge; 2015—2018	Succeeded by Neville Adderley
