= Isle of Man Companies Act 2006 =

The Isle of Man Companies Act 2006, also known as the 2006 Act, is a law which permits the incorporation of a flexible and modern corporate vehicle which was originally known as the New Manx Vehicle. Incorporation of 2006 Act companies commenced in the Isle of Man on 1 November 2006.

The Act is a stand-alone piece of legislation which supplemented existing Isle of Man Companies Act legislation rather than replaced it. Isle of Man Companies can also be incorporated under the Isle of Man Companies Acts 1931-2004 and the Limited Liability Companies Act 1996.

== Introduction ==
The Isle of Man Companies Act 2006 (the 2006 Act) provides for the incorporation of a flexible and modern corporate vehicle which was originally known as the New Manx Vehicle (‘NMV’).

== Background ==
In 2003, two Isle of Man law firms Cains, and Dickinson Cruickshank (now Appleby) began to jointly lobby the Isle of Man Government to enact a new legislation for a New Manx Vehicle (NMV) which could compete on equal terms with the International Business Companies being turned out in the thousand by the British Virgin Islands (‘BVI’). The result was the Isle of Man Companies Act 2006; a modern companies Act closely following the BVI template. Company number 1v was formed by Middleton Katz Chartered Secretaries LLC on 1 November 2006.

The Act is a stand-alone piece of legislation which supplemented existing Isle of Man Companies Act legislation rather than replaced it. Following its introduction, Isle of Man Companies can still be incorporated under the Isle of Man Companies Acts 1931-2004 and the Limited Liability Companies Act 1996.

By the end of 2013, over 10,000 Companies had been incorporated pursuant to the Isle of Man Companies Act 2006 and of those, according to Isle of Man Government statistics, 5637 remained on the register on 31 December 2013.

== Incorporation ==
In order to incorporate a 2006 Act Company, it is necessary to file a Memorandum of Association at the Isle of Man Companies Registry together with the prescribed fee. Optionally, Articles of Association can also be filed. If no Articles are filed then ‘Model’ Articles are deemed to apply.

== General Provisions ==
- Corporate Form: 2006 Act Companies can be incorporated as (i) Companies limited by shares, (ii) Companies limited by guarantee, (iii) Companies limited by share and guarantee, (iv) Unlimited companies with shares or (v) Unlimited Companies without shares
- Company names: 2006 Act companies with limited liability must have one of the following endings: (i) Incorporated or Inc, (ii) Corporation or Corp, (iii) Limited or Ltd, or (iv) Public Limited Company or PLC.
- Registered office and Agent: Every Company incorporated under the 2006 Act is required to have its registered office in the Isle of Man, and a registered agent who must be a holder of an appropriate licence issued by the Isle of Man Financial Supervision Commission.
- Directors: Unless stipulated otherwise by its articles and 2006 Act company may have a Single Director who may be a corporate entity or a natural person. Where the director is a corporate entity, it must be a holder – or a subsidiary of a holder – of an appropriate fiduciary licence issued by the Isle of Man Financial Supervision Commission.
- Corporate Capacity: In accordance with Section 21 of the Act, the ultra vires doctrine does not apply; this provides protection to persons dealing with 2006 Act Companies in good faith.
- Members: Single member companies permitted. Shares may be issued fractionally and may with or without Par value. Bearer shares however are not permitted
- Offering documents: There are straightforward requirements for offering documents. Directors are required to ensure that any Offer fairly and accurately sets out all available material information that the intended recipients would reasonably expect to be included in order to enable them to make an informed decision as to whether or not to accept the Offer.
- Capital Maintenance: There is no concept of non distributable reserves. Distributions are permitted as long as after the distribution the company (i) is able to pay its debts as they become due in the normal course of business and (ii) the value of the assets exceed the liabilities.
- Accounting Records: 2006 Act Companies are required to keep reliable accounting records, but is not required to prepare financial statements.
- Filing Requirements: A simple annual return is required to be filed at the Isle of Man Companies’ Registry which shows the directors that have served during the year. Where a Company adopts Articles of Association which are differ from the Model Articles provided for within the Act these must be filed. Additionally, a company can elect to file documents such as the offering memorandum, registers of directors, charges and members but is not obliged to do so.
- Corporate restructuring including transfer of domicile: Isle of Man Companies incorporated under the 1931-2004 Act Companies can re-register under the 2006 Act. Redomiciliation provisions in Manx Law permits foreign companies to be continued as 2006 Act companies in the Isle of Man and 2006 Act companies to redomicile to a foreign jurisdiction. The legislation also permits 2006 Act companies to be merged and consolidated and converted from a company limited by shares to a Protected Cell Company (PCC).
