= Token money =

Money of insignificant intrinsic value

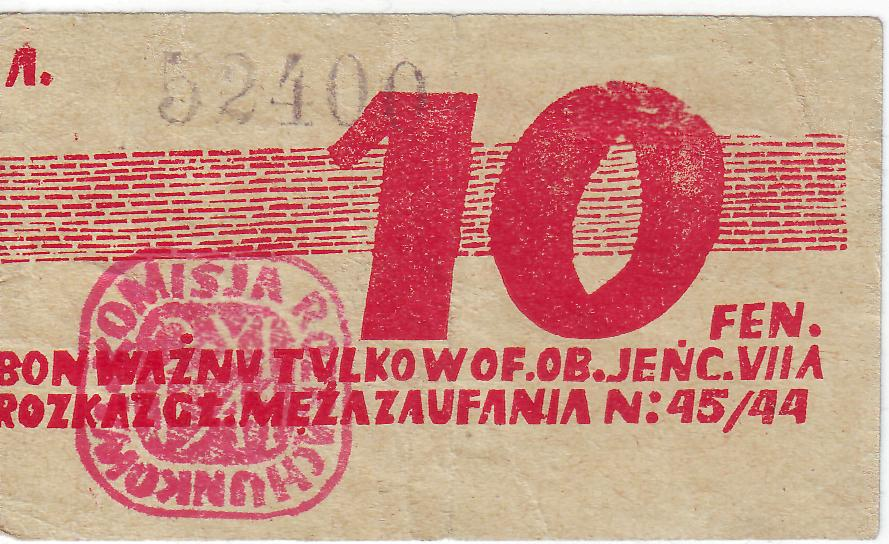
Token money used in Oflag VII-A Murnau in German Murnau am Staffelsee

Token money, or token, is a form of money that has a lesser intrinsic value compared to its face value. Token money is anything that is accepted as money, not due to its intrinsic value but instead because of custom or legal enactment. Token money costs less to produce than its face value. A banknote, e.g. a five-pound note, is token money because despite its value being five pounds it only costs significantly less to produce. A gold coin is not considered token money. Token money is similar to fiat money which also has little intrinsic value, however they differ in that token money is a limited legal tender.

Token money has been adopted in many businesses around the world as an effective way to exchange value between companies and customers. Token money as a system is predominantly used in mobile games, but is also used in the realm of e-commerce. The adoption of token money has improved transaction efficiency, as the practicalty of transacting with sums of gold poses a larger security risk. In a commodity economy, money is a measure of the value of goods and services (prices) within a sovereign country or the same economy, as well as a particular commodity to pay off debts. The token is also used as a medium of exchange, as a store of value, and as a unit of account. Digital currencies using decentralized blockchain technology are also a form of token money.

== History ==
In Ancient Greece and the Roman Empire, copper coins were used for small transactions and were issued a monetary value greater than the value of the metal itself. This established the principle of token money, which is the nature of coinage in contemporary society. Plato distinguished between tokens and commodities.

In the early nineteenth century, David Ricardo suggested issuing token money as long as it did not affect commodity standard.

=== Physical tokens ===
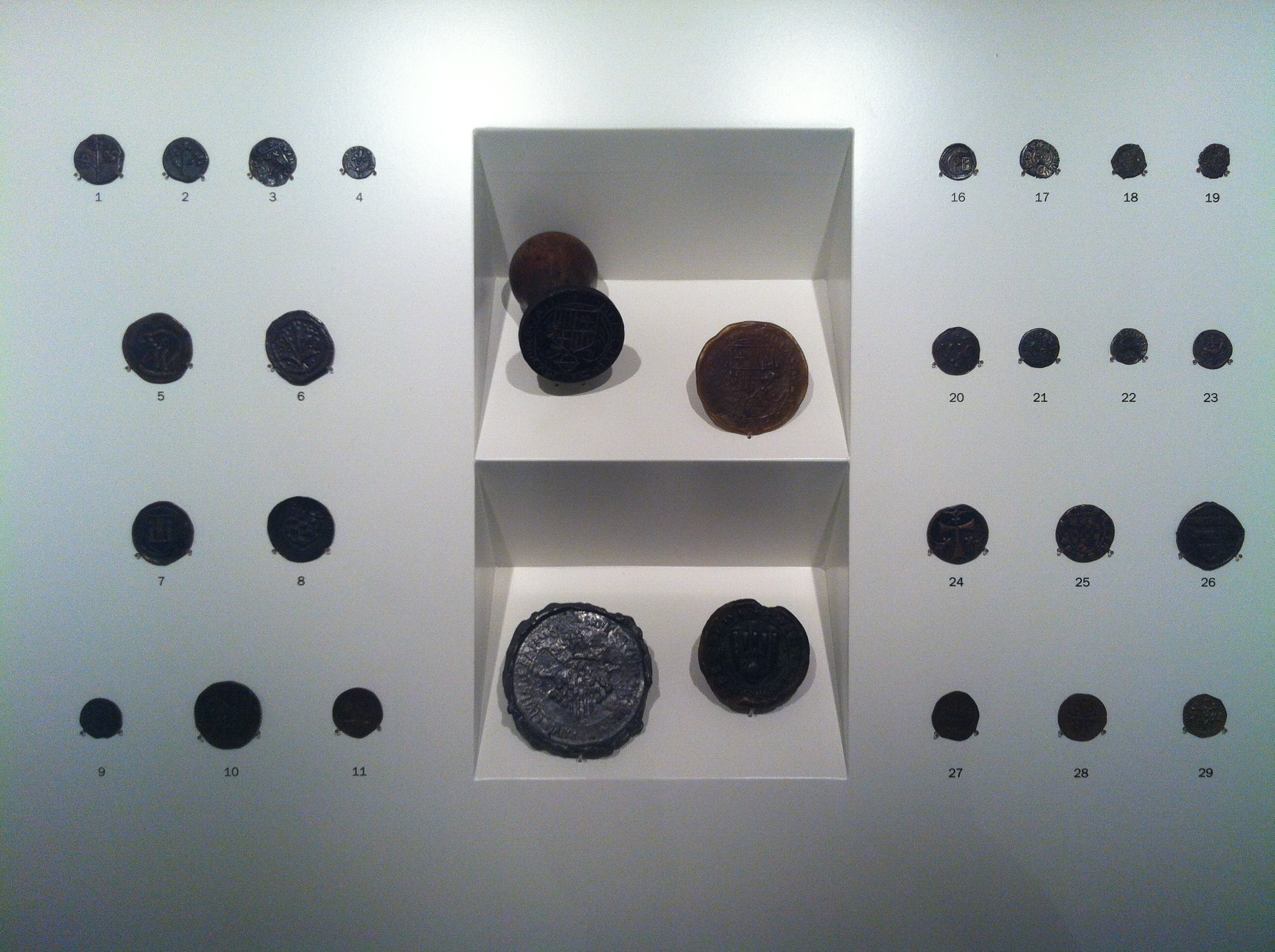
Former tokens are collected and displayed.

Token money has less intrinsic value compared to its face value. If the token money is metallic it is commonly made out of cheaper metals such as copper and nickel.

Token money is also money whose face value exceeds its cost of production, i.e. the intrinsic value is lower than the extrinsic value. This means that the actual worth of a note or coin is much less than what it is used for. The cost of production of token money is less than its actual value, for example with convertible currency, collector notes, souvenirs, coupons, some retired US banknotes and per 1986 banknotes printed in regulation size and only on one side with authorization are actually worth more dollars than when issued.

With token money, exchanges are not considered fully complete because the exchange of value is not equivalent. Value is hoped to be rendered at some future time. Examples of this include bills of exchange or negotiable instrument and certificates.

Token money does not have free coinage.

== See also ==
- Bearer instrument
- Bullion
- Store of value
