= BVI Business Companies Act =

Legislative Council of the British Virgin Islands
- Citation: An Act to provide for the incorporation, management and operation of different types of companies, for the relationships between companies and their directors and members and to provide for connected and consequential matters.
- Enacted by: Legislative Council of the British Virgin Islands
- Commenced: 1 January 2005

Repeals
- International Business Companies Act
- Status: Amended

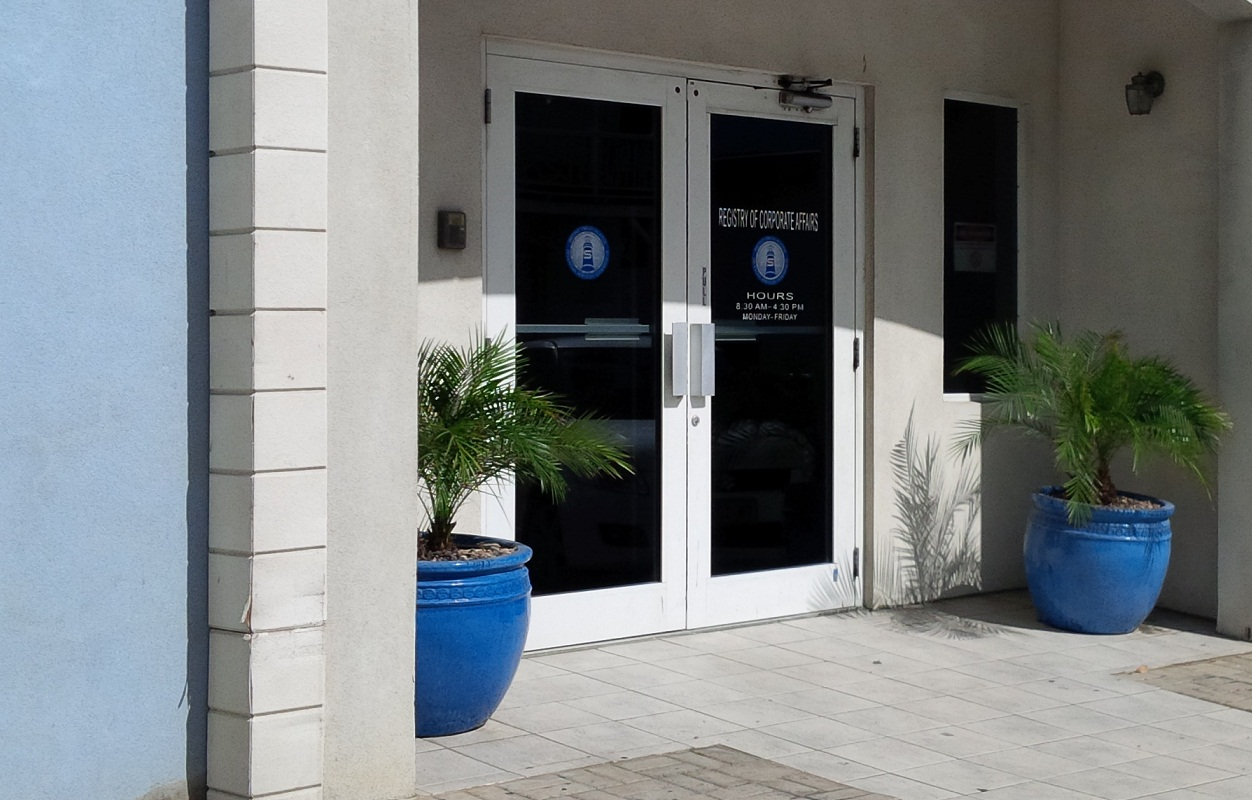
The British Virgin Islands Companies Registry (part of the Registry of Corporate Affairs).

The BVI Business Companies Act (No 16 of 2004) is the principal statute of the British Virgin Islands relating to British Virgin Islands company law, regulating both offshore companies and local companies. It replaced the extremely popular and highly successful International Business Companies Act. It came into force on 1 January 2005.

The decision to replace the International Business Companies Act was driven by two things. Firstly, there was a general perception that the older legislation was becoming a bit dated, and needed modernising. Secondly, the OECD and other multinational organisations had expressed concerns about ring-fenced tax regimes in tax havens, such as that under the older legislation and were putting jurisdictions under pressure to repeal them. The British Virgin Islands Financial Services Commission dealt with both issues in a single legislative swoop.

The BVI Business Companies Act is actually based upon a New Zealand statute (as opposed to the International Business Companies Act, which was based on Delaware corporation law). Conscious of how widely the earlier legislation had been copied by other tax havens, the BVI Business Companies Act was drafted with a large number of forms and procedures which specifically tied it into the Territory's regulatory structure, thereby making it much harder to simply copy and enact.

== Name ==
The name of the statute actually commences with "BVI". That statute is often mistakenly referred to as simply the "Business Companies Act" due to a common misinterpretation that the "BVI" is a description of the jurisdiction of enactment rather than actually part of the name.

The letters BVI were deliberately inserted as part of the branding exercise, and it was hoped that companies formed under the new legislations would be referred to as "BVIBCs". This would neatly merge the common acronym under the old legislation ("IBCs") and the common reference used in Hong Kong, the which has the largest geographical concentration of British Virgin Island companies (where they are often referred to simply as: "BVIs").

Ultimately the phrase "BVIBCs" proved to be too much of a mouthful, and in the offshore financial industry, it is more usual to refer to entities formed under the Act as "BCs", or simply "BVI companies".

== Features ==
The Act contains a number of specific features which are designed to make the British Virgin Islands more attractive as an offshore financial centre. These include:

- considerably restricting the requirement for corporate benefit
- abolishing financial assistance in relation to company shares
- abolishing the concept of a share capital in relation to company shares (and thereby en passant removing requirements relating to maintenance of capital and distributable reserves requirements for dividends)
- removing restrictions in relation to the declaration of dividends
- increasing the types of company that can be formed
- modernising the regime for registration of security interests
- the Act introduces statutory minority shareholder protections
- companies are no longer required to have a stated corporate object, thereby obviating a number of difficulties relating to ultra vires and director's duties.

== Transitional arrangements ==
The intention of the legislation was to eventually consolidate all British Virgin Islands company law into a single statute.

Prior to the BVI Business Companies Act coming into force, it was possible to incorporate a company under two different statutes: the International Business Companies Act (Cap 291) and the Companies Act (Cap 285).

After the BVI Business Companies Act came into force on 1 January 2005, it was possible to incorporate a company under any of the three statutes. It was also possible for a company which had been originally incorporated under the International Business Companies Act or the Companies Act to adopt new constitutional documents and voluntarily re-register under the BVI Business Companies Act.

After 1 January 2006, it was no longer possible to incorporate a company under the International Business Companies Act or the Companies Act, but companies which had been originally incorporated under those Acts continued to be regulated by them.

After 1 January 2007, all companies which had been originally incorporated under the International Business Companies Act were compulsorily re-registered under the BVI Business Companies Act. Detailed transitional provisions were enacted in Schedule 2 of the new Act to deal with discrepancies between the two sets of legislation.

After 1 January 2009, all companies which had been originally incorporated under the Companies Act were compulsorily re-registered under the BVI Business Companies Act. Initially it was proposed that this transition date would occur on 1 January 2008, but on 31 December 2007 emergency legislation was passed, pushing it back by a year so that the transitional provisions set out in Schedule 2 of the Act could be further amended and modified.

== Amendments ==
The Act has already been amended multiple times in its relatively brief life. Although some of the amendments relate to fine tuning legislation, and others relate to introducing new features (such as minority shareholder rights), a great many other amendments have been necessary to fix issues brought about by the transitional arrangements. Registration procedures for security interests have proved particularly difficult to resolve.

== Replications ==
Although the predecessor International Business Companies Act was widely copied by other offshore jurisdictions, it was assumed that the BVI Business Companies Act would not be similarly replicated, as the architecture of the legislation integrated it very closely with the systems and procedures of the British Virgin Islands corporate registry. However, in 2006 the Isle of Man passed new company act, the Isle of Man Companies Act, which was nearly a word-for-word copy of the BVI Business Companies Act.
