= Anchor defendant =

In law, an anchor defendant is a person who is made a defendant to a claim for the primary purpose of vesting jurisdiction to hear the claim in a certain court. Usually the purpose of the anchor defendant is to allow claims to be brought in a certain court against another defendant (not the anchor defendant) over whom the relevant court would not otherwise have jurisdiction. Accordingly, use of anchor defendants is often a variation of forum shopping.

The reference to an anchor is metaphorical; "anchoring" the proceedings to the relevant jurisdiction where they might otherwise naturally drift to another court.

== Basis ==
The use of anchor defendants as a litigation strategy relies upon two basic principles common to most legal systems. The first is that where a cause of action involves claims against multiple parties, it is convenient for all of those claims to be tried together to avoid the risk of inconsistent results. The second is that courts in different jurisdictions should seek to avoid holding concurrent trials relating to the same claims (this is usually referred to as the doctrine of lis alibi pendens), both the avoid the risk of inconsistent results and to avoid defendants having to respond to the same claims in different courts.

Accordingly, whilst there is a general recognition that courts should only entertain actions against defendants over whom they have jurisdiction, most systems will expand this to include another defendant who is a necessary and property to a claim where there is proper jurisdiction over one of the defendants.

For example, with the European Union, Article 6 of the Brussels I Regulation provides:

"A person domiciled in a Contracting State may also be sued:

(1) where he is one of a number of defendants, in the courts for the place where any one of them is domiciled;"

Similarly, the English Civil Procedure Rules provide in RSC Order 11 (found in Schedule 1):

"Rule 1 (1) Provided that the claim form does not contain any claim mentioned in Order 75, r.2 (1) and is not a claim form to which paragraph (2) of this rule applies, a claim form may be served out of the jurisdiction with the permission of the Court if—

...
(c) the claim is brought against a person duly served within or out of the jurisdiction and a person out of the jurisdiction is a necessary or proper party thereto;"

== Limitations ==
As with other types of forum shopping, the courts in various jurisdictions have taken steps to try to prevent the abuse of court systems by using anchor defendants. However, attempts to do so will always be limited by the powerful countervailing considerations of the need to ensure that all connected actions should be tried by a single court where ever possible.

For example, in Sharples v Eason & Son it was held that leave ought not be given to serve a claim outside of the jurisdiction if the sole, or predominant, reason for beginning the action a party duly served within the jurisdiction is to enable an application to be made to serve parties outside of the jurisdiction.

Furthermore, even where the use of an anchor defendant successfully vests the jurisdiction to try an action against a foreign defendant in a court, the court will often have a general residual discretion to stay the proceedings on the basis that it is not the most appropriate court to try the case (the doctrine of forum non conveniens).

In AK Investment CJSC v Kyrgyz Mobil Tel Ltd Lord Collins gave the opinion of the Privy Council summarising the applicable principles of common law in relation to determining whether it was proper to grant leave to serve proceedings on a foreign defendant who the court would not otherwise have jurisdiction over after the action had been originally commenced against an anchor defendant:

1. The fact that the motive in suing an anchor defendant is merely to bring another defendant into the jurisdiction to be joined to the action does not necessarily mean the court will exercise its discretion against giving permission to serve proceedings on a foreign defendant outside of the jurisdiction. But it is a factor which the court will consider in the exercise of its discretion.
2. However, there must be a serious issue to be tried against the anchor defendant. If there is no serious issue to be tried, or if the claim against the anchor defendant is bound to fail, then the foreign defendant should not be joined.
3. If there is a serious issue to be tried, is the connection between the anchor defendant and the foreign defendant such that the foreign defendant truly a "necessary and proper party" to that action? The Court should look to determine if there is "one investigation" against both parties, or whether the claims against both defendants are "closely bound up" with each other.

Lord Collins subsequently endorsed his own decision on those points in Nilon Limited v Royal Westminster Investments S.A..

== Examples ==
In Multinational Gas and Petrochemical Co v Multinational Gas and Petrochemical Services Ltd the liquidators of an insolvent company incorporated in Liberia wished to bring claims against the company directors in England for breach of duty and negligence. However, none of the directors were resident in Britain and none of the actions complained of had occurred within the United Kingdom. Accordingly, the liquidators brought a claim against the company's brokers (which was an affiliated company incorporated in England) alleging negligence. The claimant company then sought to join the former directors claiming they had been negligent in reviewing the advice provided by the brokers, and that the directors were a necessary and proper party to the action. The English Court of Appeal held that the only basis for bringing proceedings against the broker was to try to bring the former directors within the jurisdiction of the court, and for this and other reasons they refused to grant leave to serve the writ outside of the jurisdiction on the directors.

== External references ==
- Brussels Regulation Article 6(1) and anchor defendants
- Sabbagh v Khoury and anchor defendants
- Use of "anchor" defendants
