= Multinational Gas and Petrochemical Co v Multinational Gas and Petrochemical Services Ltd =

- Court: Court of Appeal
- Decided: 16 February 1983
- Citation: [1983] Ch 258

Court membership
- Judges sitting: Dillon LJ; Lawton LJ; May LJ

Keywords
- Directors' duties

Multinational Gas and Petrochemical Co v Multinational Gas and Petrochemical Services Ltd [1983] Ch 258 is a leading United Kingdom company law case relating to directors' liability. The case is the principal authority for the proposition that a company cannot make any claim against a director for breach of duty if the acts of the director have been ratified by the members of the company.

== Facts ==
The plaintiff company (Multinational Gas and Petrochemical Co) was a joint venture company formed between three shareholders to engage in trading, storing and shipping liquified natural gas. Originally, the company was to have been incorporated in the United Kingdom, but after taking tax advice, it was incorporated in Liberia instead, and a separate English company, Multinational Gas and Petrochemical Services Ltd (referred to as "Services") in the judgment, was incorporated to act as broker and agent. The board of directors of the plaintiff company was composed of appointees from the three shareholders.

Although the business was initially successful, it later collapsed with its liabilities exceeding the value of its assets by over £113 million. A liquidator was appointed and began examining ways in which the company might seek to recover against third parties for the benefit of the creditors. The liquidator brought proceedings against Services that alleged negligence in relation to the provision of financial information to the company. In the same action, it also brought proceedings against each of its directors by alleging negligence in failing to appreciate the obvious deficiency in information provided by services and by making highly speculative and negligent decisions, which could not reasonably be regarded as coming within the "business judgment rule".

== Judgment ==
Although the case is remembered primarily for the statements with respect to company law (referred to in both arguments and the judgment as the "company law point"), the actual decision that the Court of Appeal was required to make related to a procedural point on leave to serve proceedings out of the jurisdiction under RSC Order 11 (now repealed). Because none of the directors was resident in the United Kingdom, and none of the acts complained of by the directors had occurred within the jurisdiction (all of the board meetings had occurred overseas for tax reasons), it was necessary to obtain the leave of the court to serve out. To do so, the plaintiff company needed to satisfy the court either that the acts complained of occurred within the jurisdiction (which the court disposed of rapidly) or that the defendants were a necessary and proper party to an action which was properly commenced against a defendant within the jurisdiction (Services). On the latter point, most of the argument was focused.

Services itself was insolvent and only had nominal assets. It was largely accepted (and may even have been conceded by counsel, it having been decided by Peter Gibson J at first instance) that the predominant reason for bringing a claim against Services at all was to use it as an "anchor defendant" to launch proceedings against the defendant directors. Lawton LJ was content to dismiss the appeal and refuse to leave serve out on this basis alone, but went on to consider the "company law point". In summary, the company law point was whether the cause of action against the directors by the plaintiff company was bound to fail because the relevant acts had all been unanimously approved by the company's shareholders. If it was bound to fail on this basis, it would not be treated as having been properly brought.

Both Lawton LJ and Dillon LJ were satisfied that because the relevant acts complained of had been ratified by the shareholders of the plaintiff company, they became the acts of the company itself, and accordingly, the company could not later complain about them and bring an action in respect of them. May LJ dissented on that point.

The Court of Appeal unanimously affirmed earlier case law that the shareholders themselves owed no duty of care either to the company in which they held shares or to the creditors of that company.

== Vicarious liability ==
The plaintiff also argued that because the directors were nominated by the various shareholders, if the directors were liable, it followed that the shareholders should be vicariously liable. That point was not addressed at all by the Court of Appeal, even by May LJ, who was prepared to accept that the directors might be properly liable in the assumed facts.

== Significance ==
The case has been cited with approval on several occasions, including in Prest v Petrodel Resources Ltd and Re D'Jan of London Ltd. In Re D'Jan of London Ltd, Hoffman LJ (sitting as an additional judge of first instance) clarified that it was not sufficient that the members of the company would have ratified the director's improper acts, but it was also necessary that they must have done so.

Shortly after the case was decided, the Insolvency Act 1986 was brought into force. If that statute been in force at the relevant time, the "company law point" would likely not have arisen, as the liquidator could then have brought proceedings against the directors in his own name for wrongful trading.

== See also ==
- UK company law
- UK insolvency law
