= Registered instrument =

A registered instrument is a form of property, such as shares or bonds, where records are kept of who owns the underlying property, such as book entry system or of the transactions involving transfer of ownership such as a company's share register.

They may be contrasted with bearer instruments in which no records are kept of ownership or transfers. In general, the legal situs of the property is the place that the register is located.

== By jurisdiction ==
=== British law ===
According to the Transfer of Land Act (1915), 6 Geo.V, number 2740, § 60, the seal of the office of a registrar can substitute for a signature, on filed registered instruments.

=== United States law ===
Most states have a system of registered instruments, for example, North Carolina.

== See also ==
- Dematerialization (securities)
- Direct holding system
- Bond
- Indenture
- Stock certificate
