= Edward Bannister =

British Virgin Islands judge

Edward Bannister KC

ECSC Commercial Court Judge
- In office 2009–2015
- Monarch: Elizabeth II

Personal details
- Education: Keble College, Oxford
- Occupation: Judge
- Profession: Barrister

Edward Alexander Bannister CMG KC (born 12 August 1942) is the former Commercial Court Judge of the Eastern Caribbean Supreme Court based in the British Virgin Islands. He was appointed in 2009, and was the first ever person to hold the post.

== Life ==
Bannister was born on 12 August 1942, the son of Edward Bannister and Antonina Bannister. He was educated at St John's School, Leatherhead and Keble College, Oxford. He became a barrister practising in London, where he was regarded as one of the more able senior barristers. As counsel he appeared before the House of Lords in Stein v Blake [1995] UKHL 11.

During his appointment Justice Bannister has handed down a number of decisions which have helped to reshape British Virgin Islands commercial law, including creating the jurisdiction for "Black Swan" orders and reformulating the basis for minority prejudice relief. Justice Bannister also heard the various first instance claims relating to the Bernie Madoff fraud claims in the British Virgin Islands.

Justice Bannister is a relatively bold judge in terms of treatment of judicial precedent:

- In Zanotti v Interlog Finance Corp. he declined to follow the clear English common law rules set down in Exeter Football Club v Football Conference (although Exeter was later overturned in United Kingdom in Fulham Football Club (1987) Ltd v Richard).
- In Re C (a bankrupt), Justice Bannister partially overturned his own previous ruling in Picard v Bernard L Madoff Investment Securities LLC holding, with regret, that he now believed his earlier decision had been wrong in certain respects.
- In Nilon Limited v Royal Westminster Investments S.A. he once again declined to follow English Court of Appeal authority in Re Hoicrest Ltd and was again vindicated when the Privy Council adopted his approach and overruled Re Hoicrest.

Bannister retired from his post in 2015.

He was appointed Companion of the Order of St Michael and St George (CMG) in the 2017 Birthday Honours.

== Offices ==
Legal offices
| Preceded by New Office | Eastern Caribbean Supreme Court; Senior Commercial Court Judge; 2009–2015 | Succeeded by Barry Leon |
