= International Business Companies Act =

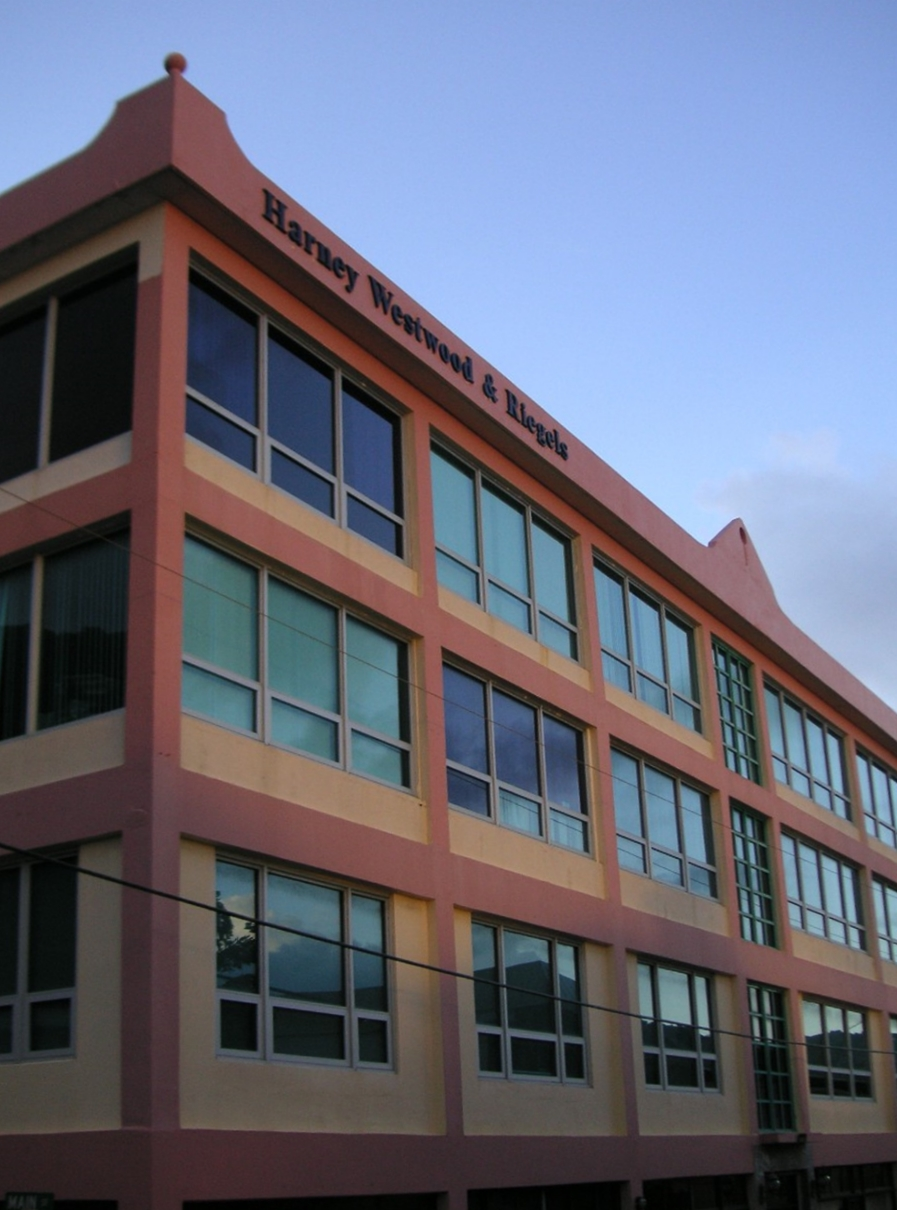
Partners at Harneys made up 3 of the original 5 draftsmen of the Act.

The International Business Companies Act, 1984 was a statute of the British Virgin Islands which permitted the incorporation of International Business Companies (IBCs) within the Territory. The Act played in a huge role in the economic and financial development of the Territory in the 1990s. It has been called "the most important piece of legislation in BVI history since the emancipation".

The original Act was copied widely by other offshore financial centres.

== Enactment ==
The Act was drafted principally by five people: Lewis Hunte, the then Attorney General of the British Virgin Islands; Neville Westwood, Michael Riegels and Richard Peters, who were partners at the law firm, Harneys; and Paul Butler, a partner from the U.S. law firm of Shearman & Sterling. The Act was subsequently amended several times, but most significantly in 1990.

The Act was passed in a partial response to the cancellation by the U.S. government of a double taxation relief treaty between the British Virgin Islands and the United States. The British Virgin Islands was not alone in this regard; this was part of a policy of mass-repeal by the United States of double tax relief treaties with "microstates".

Despite the British Virgin Islands being an English common law jurisdiction, the Act drew heavily upon elements of Delaware corporate law. This reflected the market for British Virgin Islands companies prior to the repeal of the double-tax treaty. The essence of the Act was that a company incorporated under that legislation was prohibited from conducting business with people resident within the Territory (i.e. it was for International Business), and in exchange the company was exempt from all forms of British Virgin Islands taxation and stamp duty.

Parts of the Act were quite radical for the time. The Act abolished the concept of ultra vires for companies, considerably restricted the requirement for corporate benefit, it permitted companies to change their corporate domicile from one jurisdiction to another, it allowed "true merger" of two different corporate entities, and introduced the concept of voting trusts to the jurisdiction.

The Act was passed into law by the Territory's legislature on 15 August 1984 where Chief Minister Cyril Romney hailed it as the most important legislation of the decade.

== Growth ==
Initially, market response to the legislation was slow, but by 1988 a steady core of incorporation work was evident. However, in 1990 the U.S. invaded Panama and arrested General Manuel Noriega. At the time, Panama had been one of the market leaders in the provision of offshore companies. However, the invasion badly shook investor confidence in Panama, and incorporations in the British Virgin Islands under the Act soared from 1991 onwards.

From 1991 the Act was remarkably successful generating large numbers of incorporations. The Companies Registry in the Territory had to be expanded twice to cope with the volume of incorporations. The Act was then copied widely by other Caribbean offshore financial centres.

Despite its American focus, the key market for IBCs incorporated within the Territory developed in Hong Kong. Use of British Virgin Islands IBCs became so ubiquitous in Hong Kong, that in commercial jargon offshore companies generally were generically referred to there as "BVIs".

In 2000, KPMG were commissioned by the British Government to produce a report on the offshore financial industry generally, and the report indicated that approximately 45% of the offshore companies in the world were formed in the British Virgin Islands, making the British Virgin Islands one of the world's leading offshore financial centres. As a direct result the Territory has one of the highest incomes per capita in the Caribbean.

Incorporations of IBCs
Year	Incorporations
1984	1,000
1985	1,500
1986	1,700
1986	1,700
1987	2,000
1988	7,000
1989	9,500
1990	14,000
1991	15,000
1992	19,000
1993	27,000
1994	31,000
1995	30,000
1996	40,000
1997	60,000

Source: British Virgin Islands Financial Services Commission

== Repeal ==
In 1999, a series of international initiatives were commenced against tax havens by supra-national bodies such as the OECD, including an initiative against what was termed "unfair tax competition". One of the concerns of the OECD was that jurisdictions such as the British Virgin Islands had a "ring fenced" tax regime, whereby companies could be incorporated under the International Business Companies Act which could not actually trade in the Territory, but would also be exempt from most British Virgin Islands taxes. After a series of discussions, the British Virgin Islands government agreed to repeal the ring-fencing provisions in its tax legislation.

Because of the sheer volume of companies involved, the transition to a new legislative framework was accomplished over a two-year transition period. To protect the offshore business, the British Virgin Islands abolished both income tax and stamp duty on all transactions except those relating to land in the Territory. Then the government enacted the BVI Business Companies Act (No 16 of 2004). The slightly cumbersome name was designed to slightly reflect the name of the earlier statute and cash-in on the "IBC brand" which had grown under the former legislation. From 1 January 2005 to 31 December 2005 the two Acts ran in parallel, and it was possible to incorporate a company under either form of legislation. from 1 January 2006 until 31 December 2006, one could no longer incorporate a company under the International Business Companies Act, and all new incorporations had to be conducted under the BVI Business Companies Act. During 2006 detailed transitional provisions were enacted to allow companies formed under the old legislation to adapt to the new legislation without having to significantly amend their constitutional documents.

The International Business Companies Act was then finally repealed in full on 31 December 2006.

A special arrangement between the BVI government and one of the key trust companies in the Territory meant that the last company incorporated under the Act was named "The Last IBC Limited". It was company number 690583.
