= Accounting records =

Contain financial information about a business

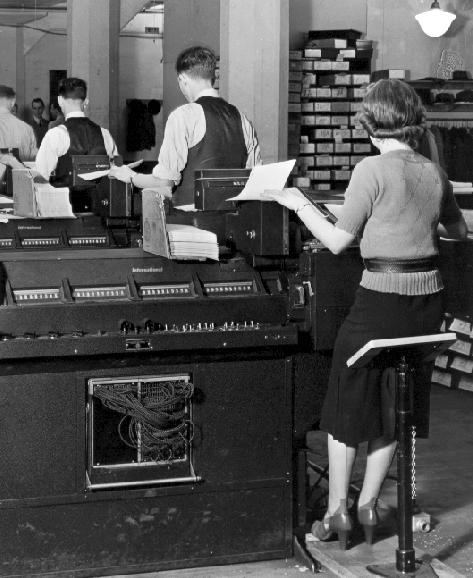
Accounting Operations

Accounting records are key sources of information and evidence used to prepare, verify and/or audit the financial statements. They also include documentation to prove asset ownership for creation of liabilities and proof of monetary and non monetary transactions.

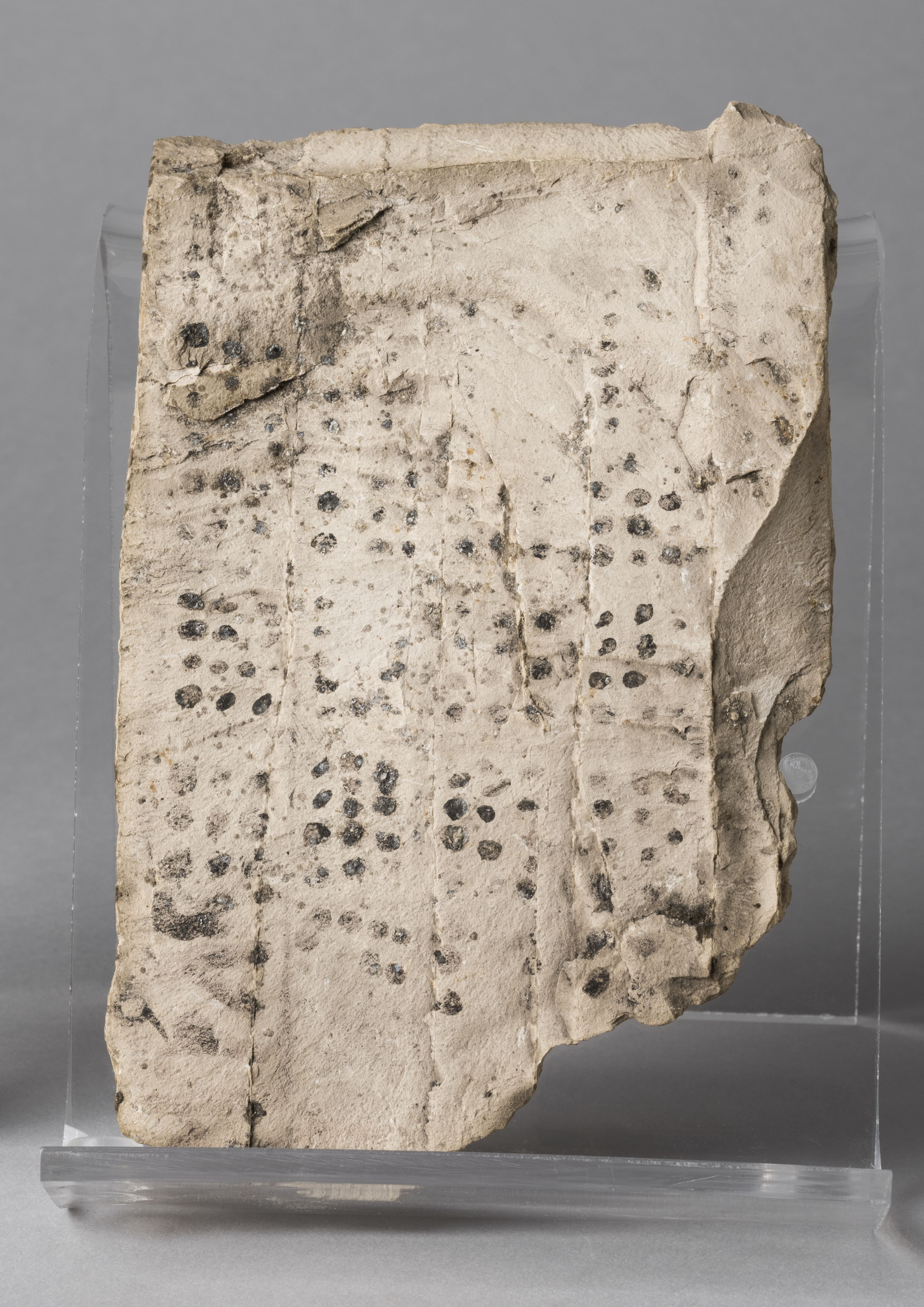
Hieratic ostracon inscribed on both sides with many dots, possibly accounting records, limestone. 1292-1076 BC, New Kingdom. Museo Egizio, Turin (S. 6613)

Accounting records can take on many forms and include (among other camps):

- Ledgers
- Journals
- Bank statements
- Contracts and agreements
- Verification statements
- Transportation receipts
- Invoices
- Vouchers

Accounting documents or document records regroup every document that plays a role in the preparation of financial statements for a company, like income statements and balance sheets. They include records of monetary transactions, assets and liabilities, ledgers, journals, etc. Accounting documents and records are the physical objects upon which transactions are entered and summarized. Examples include such items as cancelled checks, paid bills, payrolls, subsidiary ledgers, bank reconciliations.

Accounting records can be in physical or electronic formats.

In some states, accounting bodies set rules on dealing with records from a presentation of financial statements or auditing perspective. Rules vary in different countries and different industries have specific record-keeping requirements.

Accounting records are important for all types of accounting including financial accounting, cost accounting as well as for different types of organizations corporations, partnerships, LLCs, and for not for profits or for profits.

== United States ==
In the U.S., the IRS prescribes the duration for which the accounting records need to be maintained and provides records retention guidelines in Code Section 6001 and Publication 583. Some records such as CPAs' and auditors' statements are considered permanent records, while some such as a list of accounts payable and employment applications are generally only required to be kept for seven or three years respectively.

== India ==
The companies in the soda ash industry in India are required to follow guidelines prescribed by the Institute of Cost and Works Accountants of India (ICWAI).
