= Bearer instrument =

Type of financial certificate

A bearer instrument is a document that entitles the holder of the document to rights of ownership or title to the underlying property. In the case of shares (bearer shares) or bonds (bearer bonds), they are called bearer certificates. Unlike normal registered instruments, no record is kept of who owns bearer instruments or of transactions involving transfer of ownership, enabling the owner, as well as a purchaser, to deal with the property anonymously. Whoever physically holds the bearer document is assumed to be the owner of the property, and the rights arising therefrom, such as dividends.

Bearer instruments are used especially by investors and corporate officers who wish to retain anonymity. The OECD in a 2003 report concluded that the use of bearer shares is "perhaps the single most important (and perhaps the most widely used) mechanism" to protect the anonymity of a ship's beneficial owner. Physically possessing a bearer share accords ownership of the corporation, which in turn owns the asset. There is no requirement for reporting the transfer of bearer shares, and not every jurisdiction requires that their serial numbers even be recorded.

However, ownership (or legal entitlement) is extremely difficult to establish in the event of loss or theft. In general, the legal situs of the property is where the instrument is located. Bearer instruments can be used in certain jurisdictions to avoid transfer taxes, although taxes may be charged when bearer instruments are issued.

In the United States, under the Uniform Commercial Code, a negotiable instrument (such as a check or promissory note) that is payable to the order of "bearer" or "cash" may be enforced (i.e. redeemed for payment) by the party in possession. The payee (i.e. the person named in the "pay to" line) may also convert an instrument into a bearer instrument by endorsing (signing) the back. In practice, however, many merchants and financial institutions will not pay a check presented for payment by anyone other than the named payee.

Bearer shares are banned in some countries because of their potential for abuse, such as tax evasion, movement of funds, and money laundering. The United States ended federal tax deductions for interest paid on bearer bonds in 1982. Bearer shares were abolished in the United Kingdom under section 84 of the Small Business, Enterprise and Employment Act 2015 (SBEE).

== History ==
The first bearer securities in almost all countries were banknotes. Later, due to the monopolization of banknote issue by one or several banks (usually government ones), bearer instruments such as short-term bank loan obligations (certificates, vouchers, tickets) and long-term borrowing obligations of banks and corporations, bonds, were introduced. With the development of the joint-stock form of enterprises in the form of bearer securities, shares were also issued. Historically, registered shares appeared first, followed by bearer shares much later. Their appearance was associated with the development of the stock exchange.

The emergence of the first joint-stock companies can be attributed to the beginning of the 17th century: the Dutch East India Company in 1602 and after its success the English East India Company in 1613. The shares of these companies were, however, registered. The first bearer shares appeared with the establishment of John Law in France in 1717. By royal decree, John Law was granted the right to establish a joint-stock bank with a fixed capital of 6 million francs, the Banque Générale, divided into 1,200 bearer shares of 5,000 francs each. In August 1717, Law established a new joint stock company, the Mississippi Company, with a fixed capital of 100 million, divided into 200,000 bearer shares to colonize the countries lying along the banks of the Mississippi River. However, Law's mercantilist policies saw him seek to establish large monopolies, leading to the Mississippi bubble. The bubble would ultimately burst in 1720, and on November 27 of that year, the Bank officially closed.

Despite the first unfortunate experience, this form of participation in the joint-stock company as the acquisition of certificates of bearer shares became quite widespread in Europe. Today the main use of bearer instruments is in offshore financial centers for the purpose of hiding information about the real owner of the instrument.

== Bearer shares ==
Bearer shares are called securities, an anonymous holder of which is recognized from the legal point of view as a full-fledged shareholder of the company with all relevant rights. This document does not contain any indication of the name of the owner. The rights certified by the bearer act are actually owned by the owner of this document. The owner of the bearer certificate is considered the owner of shares certified by a certificate. Neither the company nor the chairman of the meeting of shareholders entered in the company's register, nor the director, any official of the company and no other authorized person is required to find out the circumstances under which the certificate was placed by its owner, or to raise the question of the validity or eligibility of any company, any actions of the owner of the certificate of such action. A shareholder is a person who actually owns a share (a share certificate). Bearer shares are transferred by simply delivering the certificate to a new holder. When the bearer shares are sold, it is not required to make any transfer inscriptions on the share certificate: The share is transferred by the physical transfer of the certificate from the seller (the bearer of the share certificate) to the buyer. The transfer of the bearer shares means the transfer of the relevant rights to the company. In contrast, a registered share contains an indication of the identity of the shareholder - only this person and no one else can be a shareholder of the company. The names of the owners are entered in the register of the company's shareholders (owners of bearer shares are not registered in the company's register), and any transfer of shares from one owner to another is carried out on the basis of a written document (for example, a contract of sale between the seller and the buyer). Information on the change of owners of registered shares is also reflected in the shareholder register.

=== Issue of bearer shares ===
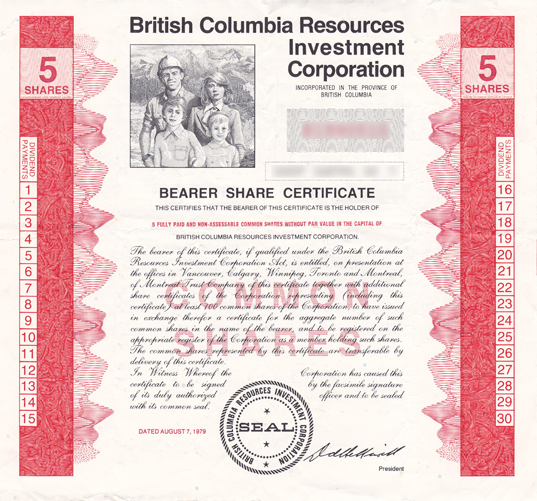
Bearer share certificate

The first and most important condition for the issue of bearer shares is the fact that this right should be provided by the legislation of the country of registration for this type of company. In addition, the right to issue certificates of shares to the bearer must be fixed in the company's constituent documents. The decision to issue shares in offshore jurisdictions is made by the company's director and at the same time the share certificate is issued.

A share certificate is the main document certifying the rights of the shareholder, in which the statutory information is mandatory: name of the issuer, certificate number, the amount of the capital, number of shares owned by the holder of this certificate, and date of issue of the certificate. In the column where the owner of the action is to be indicated, the name "bearer" is given in place of the name. This means that the actual owner of this certificate is the person who has this certificate. The company's constituent documents, as a rule, provide for the procedure for signing a certificate. In most offshore jurisdictions, share certificates must be signed by the director or other authorized person of the company.

=== World trends in legislation ===
Until recently, there was no mechanism to control the movement of bearer shares. Registered agents, sending their agent company's constituent documents, together with the certificate of registration, the charter, and the memorandum of association, passed, as a rule, the forms of certificates of shares. Questions about who owns these certificates, and how they are transferred, were not asked.

However, in the past few years, economically developed countries, in particular the United States, as well as international organizations such as OECD (Organization for Economic Cooperation and Development) and the FATF (Financial Action Task Force) have begun to put significant pressure on offshore jurisdictions. Their main claim was not even that there is preferential taxation in low-tax areas, but lack of transparency: there are no open registries, no indication of who really owns the companies. And although international organizations have no right to issue binding instructions, and can not apply sanctions, nevertheless, some offshore jurisdictions have begun to improve their legislation in accordance with the recommendations of such international organisations. The FATF reflected its main directions of the prevention of money laundering in the document "40 Recommendations". Recommendations were adopted in April 1990 and almost every year undergo some changes. Recommendations of the FATF establish measures to ensure the transparency of legal entities with a view to obtaining competent authorities access to information about the beneficial owner at any time. Changes in the legislation of offshore jurisdictions within the framework of these recommendations are most often related to the open register of shareholders and directors, cancellation of bearer shares, and information cooperation with management and control bodies. Offshore centers reacted to criticism of their use of bearer shares in different ways. In a number of low-tax jurisdictions, bearer shares were banned (Bahamas, Isle of Man, Jersey, Mauritius). Now companies are registered there, but in a much smaller number than in other offshore territories. Some jurisdictions have taken compromise measures: on the one hand they tried to comply with the requirements of international organizations, and on the other hand - the requirements of customers who register and use companies (British Virgin Islands and Belize). And some countries, formally agreeing to cooperate, nevertheless, did not make significant changes to their legislation (Seychelles).

=== Advantages and disadvantages of bearer shares ===
The main advantage for which registered companies with bearer shares earlier is confidentiality. Since at present information on holders of certificates of bearer shares is often needed to disclose even to one person, confidentiality can be called imaginary. Another advantage - the simplicity of transferring certificates of shares to the bearer is now also becoming more likely to become a drawback, namely, the insecurity of the owner from theft or loss. Any person who has acquired a certificate of bearer shares will be considered the owner of this certificate. The next drawback is the difficulty in opening a bank account. Some banks refuse to open accounts for companies that issued bearer shares, despite the fact that the client is ready to disclose all information about the owners of such shares, believing that this is contrary to their "know your client" policy. Some banks ask to deposit certificates of bearer shares with them. In addition, there may be difficulties in notifying shareholders about holding an annual meeting. As a rule, the procedure should be prescribed in the constituent documents. If a shareholder does not physically reside in this state, then it is likely that they simply will not find out about this fact. There can be a situation when the company wants to open an office in any country, and according to the legislation of this country it is necessary to confirm the fact of ownership of this company by the shareholder. A shareholder with certificates of bearer shares will not be able to confirm their rights since their name is not indicated on the certificates.

== See also ==
- Bearer bond
- Lotteries in the United States
- Scratch cards
- Token money
