= Offshore company =

Company or corporate entity established in an offshore jurisdiction

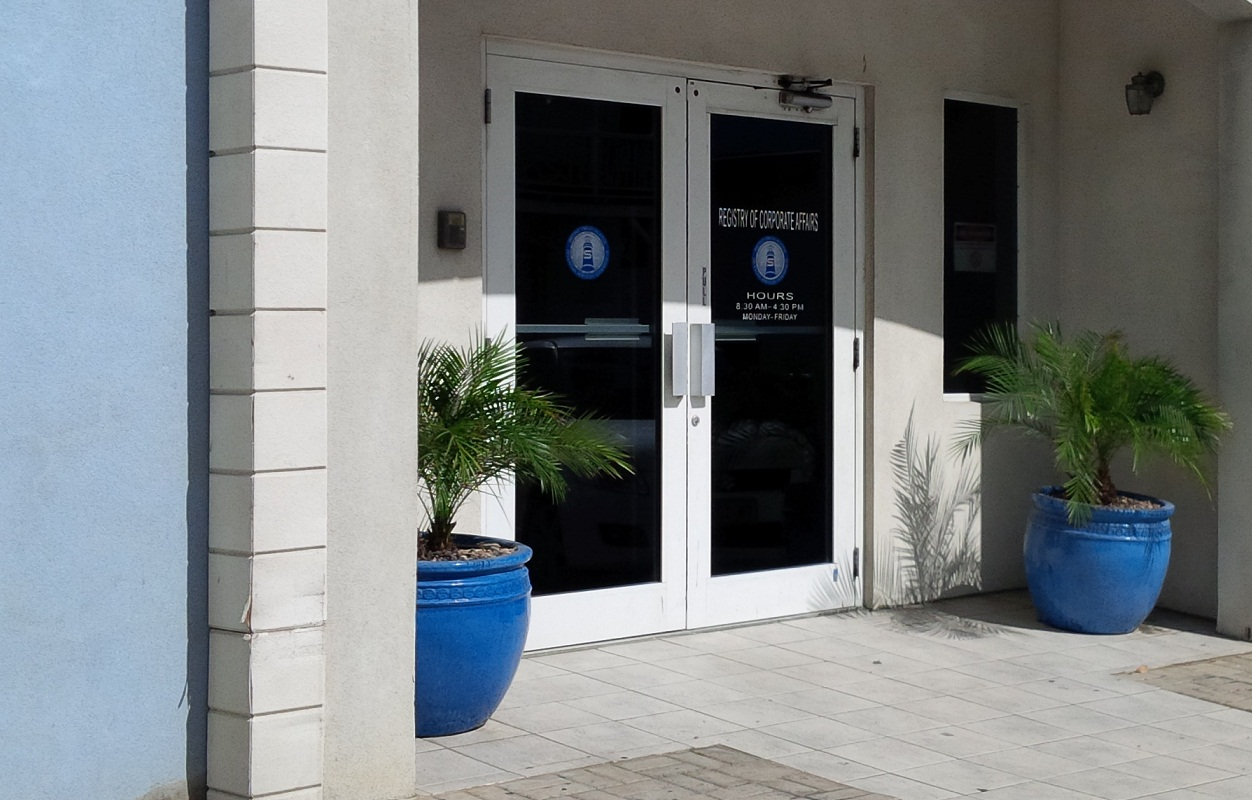
The British Virgin Islands Companies Registry.

The term "offshore company" or "offshore corporation" is used in at least two distinct and different ways. An offshore company may be a reference to:

- a company, group or sometimes a division thereof, which engages in offshoring business processes.
- International business companies (IBC) or other types of legal entities, which are incorporated under the laws of a jurisdiction that prohibit local economic activities.

The former use (companies formed in offshore jurisdictions) is probably the more common usage of the term. In isolated instances, the term can also be used in reference to companies with offshore oil and gas operations.

== Companies from offshore jurisdictions ==
In relation to companies and similar entities which are incorporated in offshore jurisdictions, the use of both the words "offshore" and "company" can be varied in application.

The extent to which a jurisdiction is regarded as offshore is often a question of perception and degree. Classic tax haven countries such as Bermuda, British Virgin Islands and the Cayman Islands are quintessentially offshore jurisdictions, and companies incorporated in those jurisdictions are invariably labelled as offshore companies. Thereafter, there are certain small intermediate countries or areas such as Hong Kong, Singapore and Mauritius (sometimes referred to as "mid-shore" jurisdictions) which, whilst having oversized financial centres, are not zero tax regimes. Finally, there are classes of industrialised economies which can be used as part of tax mitigation structures, including countries like Ireland, the Netherlands and particularly the United Kingdom, in commentary relating to corporate inversion and the use of British Overseas Territories for this purpose. Furthermore, in Federal systems, states which operate like a classic offshore centre can result in corporations formed there being labelled as offshore, even if they form part of the largest economy in the world (for example, Delaware in the United States).

=== Classifying offshore companies ===
Historically, offshore companies were broadly divided into two categories. On the one hand were companies which were statutorily exempt from taxation in their jurisdiction of registration, provided that they did not undertake business with persons resident in that jurisdiction. Such companies were usually called International Business Companies, or IBCs. Such companies were largely popularized by the British Virgin Islands, but the model was copied widely. However, in the early 2000s the OECD launched a global initiative to prevent "ring fencing" of taxation in this manner, and many leading jurisdictions (including the British Virgin Islands and Gibraltar) repealed their International Business Companies legislation. But IBCs are still incorporated in a number of jurisdictions today including Belize, Seychelles, BVI Anguilla and Panama.

Separately from IBCs, there are countries which operate tax regimes which broadly achieve the same effect: so long as the company's activities are carried on overseas, and none of the profits are repatriated, the company is not subject to taxation in its home jurisdiction. Where the home jurisdiction is regarded as an offshore jurisdiction, such companies are commonly regarded as offshore companies. Examples of this include Hong Kong and Uruguay. However, these tax regimes are not limited to conventional offshore jurisdictions: the United Kingdom operates on broadly similar principles in relation to taxation of companies.

Separately, there are offshore jurisdictions which simply do not impose any form of taxation on companies, and so their companies are de facto tax-exempt. Historically the best example of these countries were the Cayman Islands and Bermuda, although other countries such as the British Virgin Islands have now moved to this model. These could arguably fit into either of the previous two categories, depending on the fiscal point of view involved.

To the Offshore Company definition, applies five (non-cumulative) limiting conditions: (1) The government in the country of incorporation does not levy an indirect tax on the OAC (however, the OSC must pay an annual fee to the government). (2) Separate laws and regulations apply. (3) The OSC doesn't have its own physical office (address), personnel, means of communication etc. This means that the OAC must have a representative (registered agent) and office address (registered office) in the county of the incorporation. (4) The OSC must be managed and governed by (an employee of) a local trust or law office. (5) There is an instance of elements that benefit anonymity such as bearer shares and no or limited filing obligations.

=== Characteristics of offshore companies ===
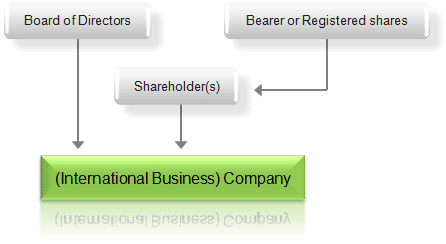
Chart of an offshore company structure

Although all offshore companies differ to a degree depending upon the corporate law in the relevant jurisdiction, all offshore companies tend to enjoy certain core characteristics:

- They are broadly not subject to taxation in their home jurisdiction.(UAE)
- The corporate regime will be designed to promote business flexibility.
- Regulation of corporate activities will normally be lighter than in a developed country.

The absence of taxation or regulation in the home jurisdiction does not exempt the relevant company from taxation or regulation abroad. For example, Michael Kors Holdings Limited is incorporated in the British Virgin Islands, but is listed on the New York Stock Exchange, where it is subject both the U.S. taxation and to financial regulation by the U.S. Securities and Exchange Commission.

Another common characteristic of offshore companies is the limited amount of information available to the public. This varies from jurisdiction to jurisdiction. At one end of the scale, in the Cayman Islands and Delaware, there is virtually no publicly available information. But at the other end of the scale, in Hong Kong companies file annual returns with particulars of directors, shareholders and annual accounts. However, even in jurisdictions where there is relatively little information available to the public as of right, most jurisdictions have laws which permit law enforcement authorities (either locally or from overseas) to have access to relevant information, and in some cases, private individuals.

In relation to flexible corporate law, most offshore jurisdictions will normally remove corporate fetters such as thin capitalisation rules, financial assistance rules, and limitations on corporate capacity and corporate benefit. A number have also removed or watered down rules relating to maintenance of capital or restrictions on payment of dividends. Beyond the common themes, a number of jurisdictions have also enacted special corporate provisions to try to attract business through offering corporate mechanisms that allow complex business transactions or reorganisations to occur more smoothly.

=== Uses of offshore companies ===
Offshore companies are used for a variety of commercial and private purposes, some legitimate and economically beneficial, whilst others may be harmful or even criminal. Allegations are frequently made in the press about offshore companies being used for money laundering, tax evasion, fraud, and other forms of white collar crime. Offshore companies are also used in a wide variety of commercial transactions, from generic holding companies, to joint ventures and listing vehicles. Offshore companies are also used widely in connection with private wealth for tax mitigation and privacy. The use of offshore companies, particularly in tax planning, has become controversial in recent years, and a number of high-profile companies have ceased using offshore entities in their group structure as a result of public campaigns for such companies to pay their "fair share" of Government taxes.

Detailed information in relation to the use of offshore companies is notoriously difficult to come by because of the opaque nature of much of the business (and because, in many cases, the companies are used specifically to preserve the confidentiality of a transaction or individual). It is a commonly held view that most uses of offshore companies are driven by tax mitigation and/or regulatory arbitrage, although there are some suggestions that the amount of tax structuring may be less than commonly thought. Other commonly cited legitimate uses of offshore companies include uses as joint ventures financing SPVs, stock market listing vehicles, holding companies and asset holding structures, and trading vehicles.

=== Popularity of offshore company jurisdictions ===
In the three-year period from 2017 to 2019, the following jurisdictions saw the following numbers of new company registrations:

Approx. No. of New Company Registrations 2017-2019
Jurisdiction	No. of New Company Registrations
Hong Kong	436,000
Cayman Islands	42,000
BVI	96,000
Ireland	68,000
Isle of Man	5,600
Singapore	185,000
Mauritius	26,446

== See also ==
- Corporate inversion
- Global sourcing
- Low-cost country sourcing
- Offshore Financial Centres
- Offshore bank
- Offshore outsourcing
- Offshore software R&D
- Offshoring
- Tax avoidance and tax evasion
- Tax haven
- Conduit and Sink OFCs
