= Interest of the company =

Legal obligation for company directors

The interest of the company (sometimes company benefit or commercial benefit) is a concept that the board of directors in corporations is in most legal systems required to use its powers for the commercial benefit of the company and its members. At common law, transactions which were not ostensibly beneficial to the company were set aside as being void as against the company.

== Background ==
An early illustration of this principle is to be found in Hutton v West Cork Railway Co (1883) 23 Ch D 654, where the English Court of Appeal held that the paying of a gratuity to employees prior to their dismissal was an improper exercise of the powers of the company, because the company was no longer a going concern, and thus stood to obtain no benefit (and no furtherance of its objects) through the payment of the gratuity; as Bowen LJ memorably remarked: "there are to be no cakes and ale except such as are required for the benefit of the company." (The decision itself is reversed by statute).

Any transaction which the directors enter into which is outside the powers of the company (and thus outside the scope of their authority) may nonetheless be ratified by the shareholders of the company, and will thereby be binding upon the company, see for example under English law, Multinational Gas and Petrochemical Co v Multinational Gas and Petrochemical Services Ltd [1983] Ch 258.

== Modern developments ==
The rule is generally seen to be particularly harsh towards both third parties and against directors, who could be regarded as being in breach of their duty merely by acting with what others might regard as common human decency. Where the company's property could not be recovered from the third party, the directors would be personally liable to recompense the company.

There were also concerns that running companies ruthlessly for the financial benefit of the shareholders had a countervailing cost, making directors unwilling to participate in programmes that were beneficial to the community generally, or to the environment. It also meant that companies became much less willing to make donations to political parties, which may have had more impetus in bringing about legislative change than concern for communities or the environment.

Some legal systems have now abrogated by statute the rule that as against third parties the transaction may be void if it has insufficient commercial benefit to the company.

In some countries, statutes now expressly provide for the directors to consider interests other than the pure financial interests of the shareholders.

However, in some jurisdictions there are proposals to make the power to act otherwise than for the financial benefit of the company even wider. For example, in the United Kingdom, the Companies Act 2006, requires that directors have to consider the impact of their actions on a much wider range of stakeholders. The Act requires a director "to promote the success of the company for the benefit of its members as a whole", but sets out six factors to which a director must have regards in fulfilling the duty to promote success. These are:

- the likely consequences of any decision in the long term
- the interests of the company's employees
- the need to foster the company's business relationships with suppliers, customers and others
- the impact of the company's operations on the community and the environment
- the desirability of the company maintaining a reputation for high standards of business conduct, and
- the need to act fairly as between members of a company

The proposed new duties have been subject to some criticism, both from those who argue that the new duties do not have sufficient bite, and also from those who fear that it diverts directors' focus from what it is that they are meant to be doing (viz., generating profits), and there are fears of widespread litigation, and increase in director's insurance premiums. However, because the new duties are expressed in non-imperative terms, and there is no sanction, the likelihood is that although they will empower the board of directors to take decisions that do not appear to directly financially benefit the company, they are unlikely to ever be required to do so.

== Distinction from other legal concepts ==
Conceptually, it is important to distinguish failure of a transaction for want of corporate benefit from other related legal concepts. These include:

- Failure of consideration: Under contract law in most common law legal systems, to be enforceable a contract requires both parties to provide consideration (i.e. something of value). However, the consideration does not need to be equal, and the gratuity given in Hutton v West Cork Railway Co would still have failed for want of corporate benefit if, for example, the company had allowed employees to purchase company property at a discount.
- Transactions at an undervalue: Although most examples of failure for want of corporate benefit involve transactions which were either a gift, or were made at a substantial undervalue, the concept is different in purpose and effect from provisions of insolvency law which prohibit undervalue transactions at a time when the company is insolvent.

== See also ==
- UK company law
- US corporate law
