= Antony Gibbs & Sons v La Societe Industrielle et Commerciale des Metaux =

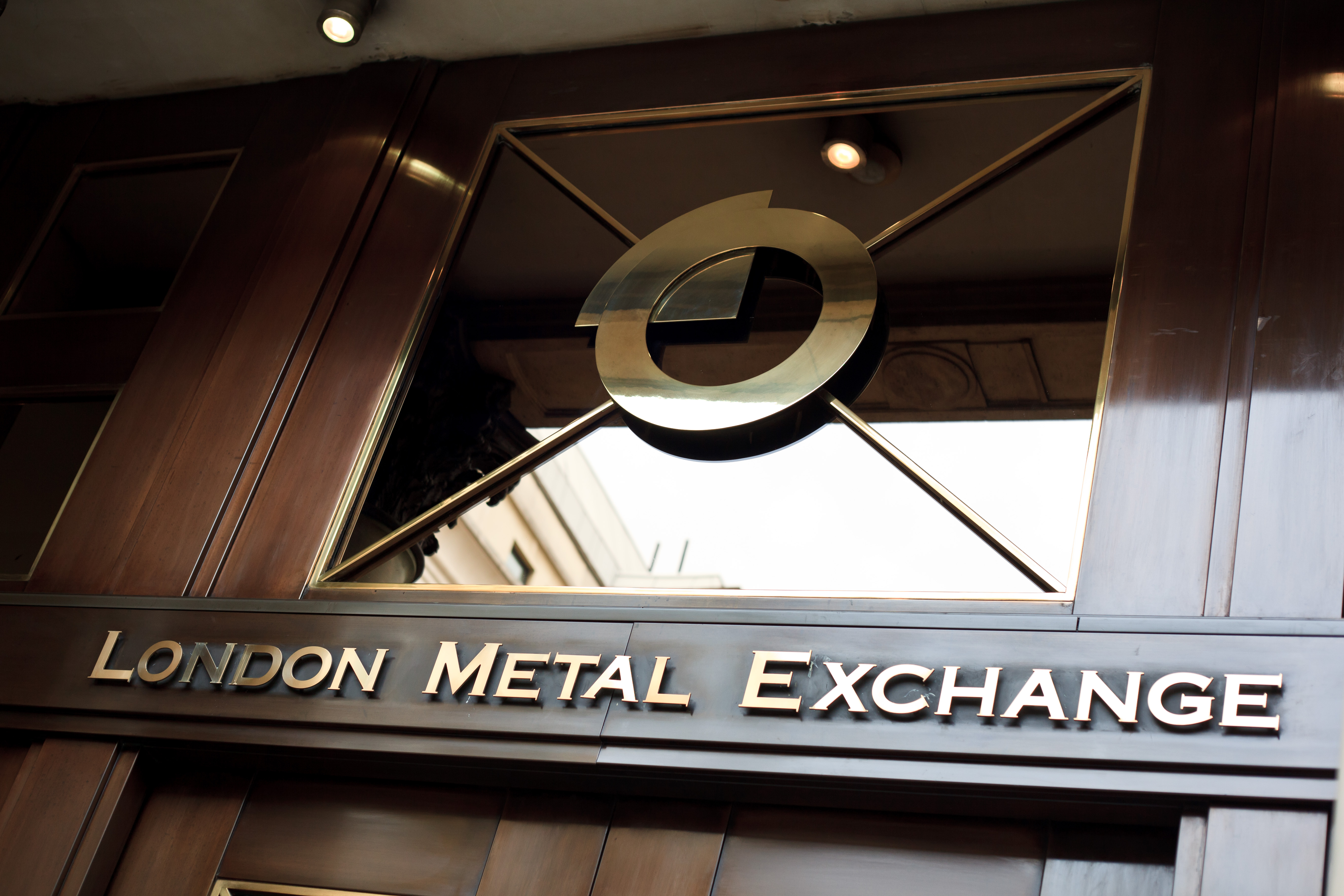
- Court: Court of Appeal of England and Wales
- Full case name: Antony Gibbs & Sons v La Societe Industrielle et Commerciale des Metaux
- Decided: 26 June 1890

Court membership
- Judges sitting: Lord Esher MR; Lindley LJ; Lopes LJ

Keywords
- conflict of laws; cross-border insolvency; discharge of claim

Antony Gibbs & Sons v La Societe Industrielle et Commerciale des Metaux (1890) 25 QBD 399 is a judicial decision of the Court of Appeal of England and Wales in relation to the effect of foreign bankruptcy upon a domestic contract.

The Court of Appeal held that "a party to a contract made and to be performed in England is not discharged from liability under such contract by a discharge in bankruptcy or liquidation under the law of a foreign country in which he is domiciled".

The resulting rule is sometimes referred to as the Gibbs rule or the rule in Antony Gibbs as a result.

== Facts ==
A French company (La Societe Industrielle et Commerciale des Metaux) contracted to buy copper from an English company (Antony Gibbs & Sons) through a broker on the London Metal Exchange. The notes confirmed that they were subject to the rules and regulations of the Exchange.

After making the contracts, the French company went into liquidation in France. But before the court ruling which put the French company into liquidation, it had refused to accept certain deliveries of the copper. It also refused to accept further delivers once in liquidation. The French liquidator advised the English company to lodge any claims for breach of contract in the French bankruptcy proceedings. The English company did so, but expressed those claims to be without prejudice to their right to their claims against the French company which were pending in the English courts.

In the French bankruptcy the claim for non-acceptance of copper before the liquidation was accepted and the English company received a pro rata claim. But the claim for non-acceptance after the liquidation was rejected.

The English action came before Stephen J initially, who accepted the English company's claim. The liquidators of the French company then appealed to the Court of Appeal.

== Decision ==
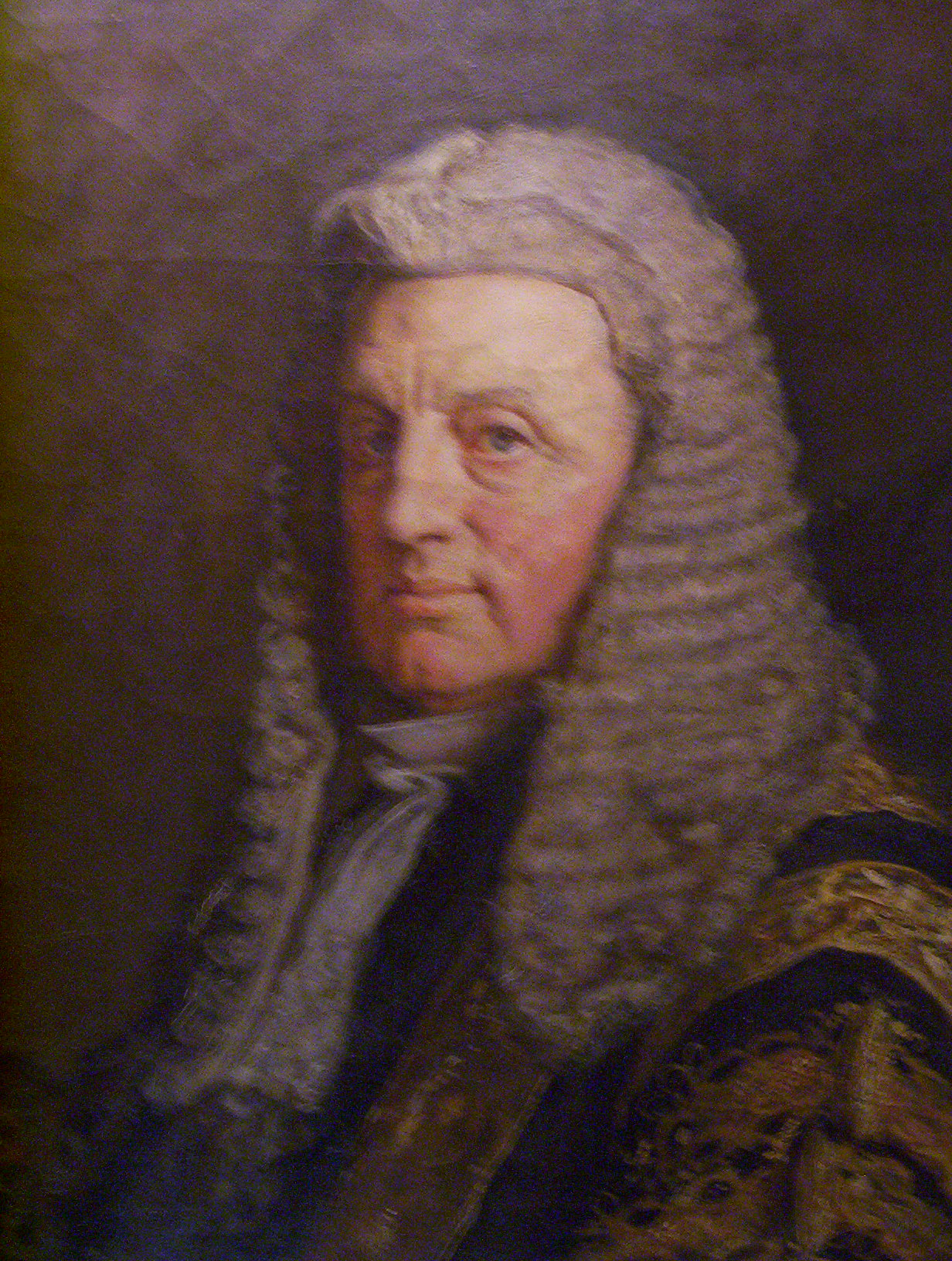
Lord Esher gave the main decision.

Lord Esher MR gave the main decision. He noted that experts as to French law had given evidence that (i) under French law the liquidation proceedings discharged the claim of the English company, and (ii) that under French law the company no longer existed, having been dissolved.

Lord Esher largely cut across the expert evidence. In his view the contracts were governed by English law, and as such it was a matter for English law to determine whether they were extant, discharged, or breached. Hence, in his view the application of a provision of French law in relation to the contractual obligations was not material.

He thought that the suggestion French law should affect the provision because it was the domicile of the bankrupt company was incorrect. He cited Smith v Buchanan (1800) 1 East 6, 102 ER 3, as authority that it would be wrong to hold the claimants bound by some foreign legal provision that they had not assented to. He also cited Westlake in support. He rejected a decision of Lord Blackburn (Bartley v Hughes 1 B&S 375, 121 ER 754) which had expressed doubt on the issue. He also cited with approval the comments of the noted American jurist, Joseph Storey.

Lindley LJ and Lopes LJ gave short concurring judgments.

== Commentary ==
The rule is still regarded as good law in many common law countries. In England it has been upheld by the Court of Appeal as recently as 2018. Other recent applications of the rule include Global Distressed Alpha Fund v PT Bakrie Investindo [2011] EWHC 256 (Comm) at [11]-[13] and [25]-[27]; Erste Bank v Red October [2013] EWHC 2926 (Comm) at [126]; and Dubai Islamic Bank PJSC v PSI Energy Holding Company BSC [2013] EWHC 3186 at [39].

Nevertheless, the rule has been subject to sustained criticism as parochial and "Victorian", by rejecting the effect of foreign insolvency proceedings or any attempt at universalism in favour of domestic considerations.
