= Ralph Zulman =

South African judge (1938–2020)

Judge of the Supreme Court of Appeal
- In office 1 September 1996 – 2007
- Appointed by: Nelson Mandela

Personal details
- Born: Ralph Hirsch Zulman; 23 September 1938 Durban, Natal Province; Union of South Africa
- Died: 8 August 2020 (aged 81) Johannesburg, South Africa
- Education: Parktown Boys' High School; University of the Witwatersrand; Tulane University Law School

Ralph Hirsch Zulman (23 September 1938 – 8 August 2020) was a South African judge who served in the Supreme Court of Appeal from 1996 to 2007. Formerly an advocate and Senior Counsel in Johannesburg, he joined the bench in 1990 as a judge of the Transvaal Provincial Division of the Supreme Court of South Africa. He was the chairman of the General Council of the Bar in 1988.

== Early life and education ==
The son of Mosie and Annie Zulman, Zulman was born on 23 September 1938 in Durban. He matriculated in 1955 at Parktown Boys' High School in Johannesburg and went on to the University of the Witwatersrand, where he completed a BComm in 1959 and an LLB cum laude in 1961. He later completed an LLM at Tulane University in New Orleans, Louisiana in 1963 and a higher diploma in income tax law at the University of the Witwatersrand in 1981.

== Legal career ==
After serving his articles of clerkship in Johannesburg at the firm of Edward Nathan, Friedland, Mansell and Lewis, Zulman was admitted as an attorney in 1961. However, in July 1963, he joined the Johannesburg Bar as an advocate. He practised there for the next 27 years, establishing chambers on Pritchard Street and developing a specialty in the rules of the Supreme Court of South Africa. He took silk in 1978. He also lectured part-time at his alma mater from 1966 to 1969 and from 1982 to 1985, and he was elected as chairman of the General Council of the Bar of South Africa in 1988.

== Judicial career ==
In 1990, Zulman was appointed as a judge of the Transvaal Division of the Supreme Court. He served there until 1 September 1996, when President Nelson Mandela elevated him and Chris Plewman to the Appellate Division. He remained in the appellate division after it became the Supreme Court of Appeal the following year; indeed, the Mail & Guardian said that he was the only member of the Appellate Division to support the appointment of his personal friend Ismail Mahomed as the Chief Justice of the Supreme Court of Appeal.

An expert on cross-border insolvency, Zulman represented South Africa at the United Nations Commission on International Trade Law's colloquium on the Model Law on Cross-Border Insolvency, and he was involved in training magistrates to serve in South Africa's newly established Equality Courts.

== Retirement and personal life ==
Zulman was Jewish – his parents were founding members of Johannesburg's Oxford Shul – and he was an active member, and former national vice-chairperson, of the South African Jewish Board of Deputies. He was also a former chairperson of the South African wing of the Yad Vashem Foundation, a Holocaust education organisation, and a member of the editorial board of Jewish Affairs magazine, to which he frequently contributed book reviews. In 1965, he married Lynette Jonas, with whom he had a son and two daughters.

After his retirement in 2007, Zulman chaired an inquiry into allegations of misconduct at the South African Sports Confederation and Olympic Committee; his report, published in December 2018, resulted in governance reform at the committee. He died of COVID-19 complications on 8 August 2020 in Johannesburg.
