= Insolvency Regulation =

European Union Regulation

The Insolvency Regulation is an EU Regulation concerning the rules of jurisdiction for opening insolvency proceedings in the European Union. It determines which member states' courts have jurisdiction.

== History ==
EU member states concluded the Convention on Insolvency Proceedings in 1995, however it never entered into force as ratification by all member states was required and the United Kingdom did not sign within the timelines specified in the Convention.

== Content ==
The EC Regulation on Insolvency Proceedings 2000 was passed on 29 May 2000 and came into effect on 31 May 2002. It replaced the substance of the 1995 Convention. The Regulation applies between all member states of the European Union, with the exception of Denmark which has an opt-out from the EU's Area of freedom, security and justice, and focuses upon creating a framework for the commencement of proceedings and for the automatic recognition and co-operation between the different member states. Unusually for a European regulation, the EC Insolvency Regulation does not seek to harmonise insolvency laws between the different member states.

Like the UNCITRAL Model Law on Cross-Border Insolvency, the EC Regulation also employs the concept of a centre of main interest (or "COMI"). The definition of the COMI is left to member states in their implementation of the Regulation, but paragraph (13) of the preamble states: 'The "centre of main interests" should correspond to the place where the debtor conducts the administration of his interests on a regular basis and is therefore ascertainable by third parties.' If the COMI of an entity is outside of the European Union then the insolvency proceedings are not subject to the Regulation. In relation to companies there is a presumption that the registered office will be the COMI of the company, but this presumption can be (and often is) rebutted.

The EC Regulation does not define insolvency, but it does define insolvency proceedings as being 'collective insolvency proceedings which entail the partial or total divestment of a debtor and the appointment of a liquidator'. Article 3 divides proceedings into main proceedings and territorial proceedings. The main proceedings are accorded extraterritorial effect throughout the European Union. One of the concerns which has been expressed in relation to the EC Regulation is that (other than a reference to the European Court of Justice) there is no mechanism for determining which set of proceedings are to be regarded as the main proceedings if two or more jurisdictions claims that their own proceedings are the main proceedings.

An amendment to the regulation was approved in 2015, which again applied to all EU member states except Denmark.

== See also ==
- Cross-border insolvency
- UK insolvency law
- Directive 2001/24/EC, reorganisation and winding up of credit institutions
- Directive 2001/17/EC, reorganisation and winding up of insurance undertakings
