= Judiciary of the British Virgin Islands =

The judiciary of British Virgin Islands is based on the judiciary of the United Kingdom. The British Virgin Islands is a member state of the Eastern Caribbean Supreme Court. The courts are organized at four levels, including the provision for final appeal to the Judicial Committee of the Privy Council in London.

The British Virgin Islands is a common law jurisdiction, although British Virgin Islands law and procedure differs to a great degree from English law because of local statutes, orders and civil procedure rules. However, in certain instances British Virgin Islands law provides that in default of any local provision, English law or procedure shall apply.

== Magistrate's Court ==
The Magistrate's Court is the court of lowest jurisdiction in the British Virgin Islands. The Magistrate's Court deals mainly with criminal matters with summary jurisdiction, minor civil claims, and certain family law matters. The Magistrate also has limited jurisdiction in relation to salvage and wreck.

For criminal matters which are triable either way (i.e. either summarily or on indictment) the accused is given the choice to face trial in the Magistrate's Court without a jury or to elect for a trial before a jury in the High Court. Accused tried in the Magistrate's Court are only be punishable to the extent of the limited sentencing powers of the Magistrate if convicted.

Appeals from the decision of the Magistrate are appealed directly to the Court of Appeal, and do not go the High Court by way of case stated.

== High Court ==
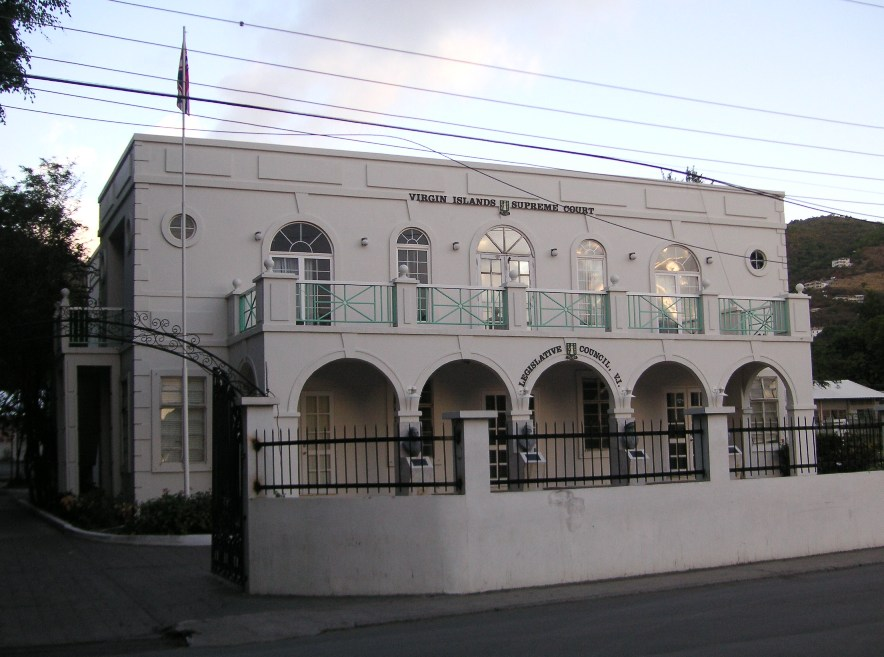
The Virgin Islands Supreme Court

The Eastern Caribbean Supreme Court is the superior court of record in the British Virgin Islands. Although commonly referred to as the High Court, technically its correct name is the Supreme Court. It is a court of unlimited jurisdiction in the British Virgin Islands.

The British Virgin Islands has one sitting judge of the High Court, and at present that judge is Vicki Ann Ellis (since 2012).

In the addition, the Commercial division of the Supreme Court also sits in the British Virgin Islands. It was established in May 2009 and is known universally (if slightly inaccurately) as the Commercial Court. The present sitting judge is Mr Gerhard Wallbank (since 2019). Although the Commercial Court may hear cases from any of the nine member jurisdictions of the Eastern Caribbean Supreme Court, in practice for a number of different reasons the Commercial division's work is predominately from the British Virgin Islands. The minimum value for a claim to be brought in the Commercial Court is US$500,000, although most cases are considerably larger than that.

Civil procedure in the High Court and its appellate courts is regulated by the Eastern Caribbean Supreme Court Rules (usually referred to as the CPR). The CPR do not apply to various types of action, including family proceedings, insolvency, non-contentious probate, and where the High Court is acting as a prize court.

== Court of Appeal ==
Appeals from both the Supreme Court and Magistrate's Court are heard by the Court of Appeal of the Eastern Caribbean Supreme Court. The Court of Appeal rotates through the Caribbean member states, and usually sits in the British Virgin Islands twice a year. Although most appeals are heard when the court is sitting within the relevant country, for emergency appeals, lawyers can appear in a British Virgin Islands appeal in any jurisdiction where the court happens to be sitting.

== Privy Council ==
Appeal from the Court of Appeal lies to the Privy Council in London.

There have been a number of appeals from the British Virgin Islands to the Privy Council over the years. Notable cases in the Privy Council which were appeals from the British Virgin Islands include:

- Nilon Limited v Royal Westminster Investments S.A. [2015] UKPC 2 (relating to rectification of share registers)
- T Choithram International SA v Pagarani [2000] UKPC 46 (relating to formalities of trusts and imperfect gifts)
- Alfa Telecom v Cukurova Finance [2012] UKPC 20 and [2013] UKPC 2 (relating to the Financial Collateral Arrangements (No.2) Regulations 2003).
- Stichting Shell Pensioenfonds v Krys [2014] UKPC 41 (relating to anti-suit injunctions)
- Hague v Nam Tai Electronics [2006] UKPC 52 and [2008] UKPC 13
- Smith & Ors v Molyneaux [2016] UKPC 35 (concerning adverse possession)

== Transnational courts ==
=== Caribbean Court of Justice ===
The British Virgin Islands is not a member of the Caribbean Court of Justice. Although the issue is discussed periodically in the press, at this time there seems to be no strong impetus to change from one final appellate court in a foreign jurisdiction (the Privy Council in London) to another (the Caribbean Court of Justice in Port of Spain).

=== European Court of Human Rights ===
Although the British Virgin Islands is not a member of the Council of Europe, the European Convention on Human Rights has been extended to the British Virgin Islands by the United Kingdom. No cases relating to the British Virgin Islands have yet been heard by the European Court of Human Rights, but in a British Virgin Islands case the court noted the tension between certain provisions of the Convention and the Eastern Caribbean Civil Procedure Rules.

=== Inter-American Court of Human Rights ===
The British Virgin Islands is not a member state of Organization of American States and is not subject to the jurisdiction of the Inter-American Court of Human Rights.
