= Drifters Adventure Tours CC v Hircock =

South African legal case

Drifters Adventure Tours CC v Hircock [2006] ZASCA 174 is an important case in South African contract law, especially in the area of exemption clauses. It was heard in the Supreme Court of Appeal (SCA) on 4 September 2006, with judgment handed down on 29 September. The judges were Zulman JA, Farlam JA, Conradie JA, Mlambo JA and Maya JA. Counsel for the appellant was AR Sholto-Douglas SC (with him S Miller); RS van der Riet SC appeared for the respondent.

== Facts ==
The respondent, Hircock, had sustained injuries as a result of a motor vehicle accident negligently caused by an employee of Drifter's Adventure Tours, the appellant, while she had been a passenger on a tour arranged by Drifter's. She claimed damages.

Drifter's declared that it was excluded from such liability on the basis of an indemnity form signed by Hircock before the tour. The front of the form had a wide indemnity clause and a statement that the conditions on the reverse had been read, fully understood and accepted. These reverse conditions contained a more limited clause that exempted Drifter's from liability arising from, inter alia, "the nature of hiking, camping, touring, driving."

The Court a quo held that the form did not exempt Drifter's from liability.

== Judgment ==
On appeal, the SCA affirmed that indemnity provisions in general should be construed restrictively, and that the wider indemnity clause had to be read and interpreted in the context of the contract as whole, including its reverse side. In case of doubt, an exemption clause reasonably capable of bearing more than one meaning should be given the interpretation least favourable to, and with a bias against, the proferens.

The court said that it was possible to interpret the expression "driving" as driving anywhere in the country and on any terrain, including passenger transportation on a public road. The reasonable reader, however, would probably not interpret it in this way, and so, in light of established interpretative canons, the court did not favour this interpretation. The word "driving" occurred in the context of other adventure activities; it therefore made better sense to understand it to entail driving over unmade roads or slippery, steep or otherwise exciting terrain. Since Drifter's, as a cross-border tour operator, was statutorily obliged to have passenger liability insurance, it would be perverse for it to have contracted out of this liability altogether.

The appeal was accordingly dismissed and the decision in the Cape Provincial Division, in Hircock v Drifters Adventure Tours CC, confirmed.

== See also ==
- South African contract law
- English contract law
- Unfair Contract Terms Act 1977 section 2(1)
