= List of bankrupts =

Personal bankruptcy (also known as personal insolvency) law allows, in certain jurisdictions, an individual to be declared bankrupt, which is a legal status of a person or other entity that cannot repay the debts it owes to creditors. In most jurisdictions, bankruptcy is imposed by a court order, often initiated by the debtor. Personal bankruptcy is distinguished from corporate bankruptcy, which generally does not directly affect the business owners' personal assets.

Modern bankruptcy law often distinguishes reorganization, in which only some of the bankrupt's assets are taken, a repayment plan is devised and part of the debt is discharged, from liquidation. In the latter type of bankruptcy, all of the debtors assets are included in the bankruptcy estate, sometimes in addition to his disposable income for a period of time, after which all of the debts are discharged.

The details vary between jurisdictions. In the US, the liquidation bankruptcy is governed by Chapter 7 of the Title 11 of the United States Code and is generally available to individuals passing a means test. Reorganization bankruptcy is governed by Chapters 11 and 13. Chapter 11 is mostly used by high net-worth individuals. In the 12-month period ending June 30, 2017, Chapter 7 and Chapter 11 bankruptcy filings accounted for, respectively, 474,258 (61%) and 1,099 (0.14%) out of 772,594 nonbusiness bankruptcy filings in the USA.

== Notable bankrupts ==
Bankruptcy filings by celebrities generate extensive publicity, which has been cited as a factor contributing to a shift towards a less negative public perception of personal bankruptcy observed since the 1960s. Lawyers have reported using celebrity examples to persuade their clients to file for bankruptcy.

Listed below are notable individuals who filed for personal bankruptcy or were subject to a similar form of insolvency management process. The list does not include business bankruptcies and bankruptcies that were not officially recognized.

=== Key ===
Liquidation
Reorganization

Chapter 7	Chapter 7, Title 11, United States Code	USA
Chapter 11	Chapter 11, Title 11, United States Code	USA
Chapter 13	Chapter 13, Title 11, United States Code	USA
BR 1914/1926	Bankruptcy under the Bankruptcy Acts 1914 and 1926	United Kingdom
IA 1986	Bankruptcy under the Insolvency Act 1986	United Kingdom

Name	Known as	Bankruptcy type	Year of filing	Details
Rembrandt	Dutch painter	Cessio bonorum	1656	His assets, including a collection of paintings, were subsequently auctioned off.
Immanuel Nobel	Swedish engineer, father of Alfred Nobel	Petition to Stockholm's magistrates' court	1833	The bankruptcy was a result of a loss of three barges carrying construction materials. He became insolvent again in 1856.
Mathew Brady	American Civil War photographer	Warrant in bankruptcy issued by the District Court for the Southern District of New York.	1873	Brady ran into debt after investing over $100,000 to create over 10,000 plates. He expected the US government to buy the photographs after the war, but it refused to do so, thus forcing Brady into bankruptcy. In 1875, the United States Congress purchased the entire archive for $25,000, which went towards the debts. He died destitute in the charity ward of Presbyterian Hospital in New York in 1896.
Henry J. Heinz	founder of Heinz	—	1875	Assets of $110,000 and debt of $160,000. The bankruptcy was a result of a failure of his condiment business Noble and Company selling horseradish, caused by the financial crisis known as the Panic of 1873. He was twice arrested and released. He was tried for fraud in 1876 and acquitted. In the same year he started a new company, F & J Heinz, with his brother John Heinz and a cousin Frederick Heinz. One of its products was the tomato ketchup, which proved highly successful. Heinz was released from bankruptcy in 1885.
James Abbott McNeill Whistler	American artist	Bankruptcy Act 1869	1879	The bankruptcy was caused by legal costs of a libel lawsuit against the critic John Ruskin. Whistler won the case, but the damages awarded were insufficient to cover the costs.
Samuel Clemens (known as Mark Twain)	American author	Assignment for Benefit of Creditors	1894	He owed over $100,000. The bankruptcy was caused by failed investments, notably in the Paige Compositor, a mechanical typesetter that failed because of its complexity and imprecision. Clemens paid off his debts in full, despite no legal obligation to do so, after conducting a series of profitable public lectures. The bankruptcy was filed under the New York state law since the United States did not have a federal bankruptcy law at the time.
Oscar Wilde	Irish author	Bankruptcy Act 1883	1895	He owed £3591. The bankruptcy was caused by legal costs following an unsuccessful lawsuit, which also led to his imprisonment for homosexual behaviour. He died destitute in 1900.
Mary Nolan	American actress	—	1931	No assets against debt of $50,000. Caused by the Wall Street Crash of 1929.
William Fox	co-founder of 20th Century Fox	Section 21a of the Bankruptcy Act (11 U.S.C. § 44(a))	1936	Assets of $1,600,000 and debt of $9,535,261. In 1942, he was imprisoned for obstructing the justice during the bankruptcy proceedings. He attempted to bribe judge John Warren Davis with a $27,500 loan. He served half of his one-year sentence.
William Durant	co-founder of General Motors	Filed in the Federal District court in New York.	1936	His listed clothing worth $250 as his only asset against a debt of $914,000. The bankruptcy followed the Wall Street Crash of 1929 and the ensuing Great Depression, which led to the failure of his company Durant Motors.
Veronica Lake	American actress	Filed in US Federal Court.	1951	Assets of $168,050 against debt of $156,573.91. Around the time of the bankruptcy, the IRS seized her property due to non-payment of the income tax.
Mickey Rooney	American actor	Chapter 11	1962	Assets of $500 against debt of $464,914.
Dorothy Dandridge	American actress and singer	—	1963	Caused by bad oil investments.
Jimmie Nicol	British drummer	BR 1914/1926	1965	He owed £4,066.
Vic Damone	American singer	Filed in US District Court.	1971	Assets of $35,371 against debt of $784,137 including nearly $300,000 in unpaid taxes. Damone filed for bankruptcy a month after his divorce from actress Judith Rawlins.
Lionel Bart	British musician	BR 1914/1926	1972	He owed £73,000.
Isaac Hayes	American singer	Filed in a federal court.	1976	He owed about $6,000,000. Filed for bankruptcy together with his wife. He described tax liens as the precipitating factor for bankruptcy.
Marvin Gaye	American singer	—	1976	He owed $6,946,058. The bankruptcy followed his divorce and a court order requiring him to pay his ex-wife $600,000 of alimony. He filed for bankruptcy for his company Right-On Production at the same time.
Vince McMahon	American wrestling promoter	Filed in a U.S. bankruptcy court.	1976	They owed a total of $955,805 to 26 distinct creditors. The joint bankruptcy followed a failed investment.
Linda McMahon	American wrestling promoter and politician	Filed in a U.S. bankruptcy court.	1976	They owed a total of $955,805 to 26 distinct creditors. The joint bankruptcy followed a failed investment.
Donald Eugene Lytle (known as Johnny Paycheck)	American singer	Filed in U.S. Bankruptcy Court	1976	Assets of $153,232 against debt of $488,611.
Donald Eugene Lytle (known as Johnny Paycheck)	American singer	Filed in U.S. Bankruptcy Court	1982	He filed for bankruptcy shortly before an auction was due to take place to sell his belongings to satisfy tax debt.
Donald Eugene Lytle (known as Johnny Paycheck)	American singer	Filed in U.S. Bankruptcy Court	1990	He owed $1,600,000, mostly unpaid taxes. He was serving a prison sentence for assault at the time.
Randy Johnson	American football player	—	1977	—
Larry King	television host	Chapter 7	1978	He owed $352,000. The bankruptcy was caused by his inability to find employment following a grand larceny charge. He began hosting the Larry King Show in the same year.
Tom Petty	American musician	Chapter 11	1979	Assets of $56,845 against debt of $576,638. Petty used the bankruptcy to strengthen his position in negotiations with the music label MCA Records, which had bought his indie label.
Cyndi Lauper	American singer	Chapter 7	1981	Caused by a lawsuit brought by her former manager, following a split of her band.
George Best	Northern Irish footballer	BR 1914/1926	1982	He was made bankrupt by the Inland Revenue over £22,000 of unpaid taxes. He was discharged in 1992. He said of his career: "I spent a lot of money on booze, birds [women] and fast cars – the rest I just squandered".
Michael Lee Aday (known as Meat Loaf)	American musician	Chapter 7	1983	He owed $1,600,000.
Francis Ford Coppola	American filmmaker	Chapter 11	1983	An involuntary Chapter 11 petition was filed by creditors for one of Coppola's companies, Hollywood General Studios. This and the following bankruptcies were a result of financial failure of the movie One From the Heart which Coppola had financed with his own money.
Francis Ford Coppola	American filmmaker	Chapter 11	1990	At the same time, Coppola filed a separate Chapter 11 petition for one of this companies, Zoetrope Productions.
Francis Ford Coppola	American filmmaker	Chapter 11	1992	Combined assets of $52,000,000 and debts of $98,000,000. The bankruptcy covered Coppola personally together with his wife, and his two companies, Zoetrope Corporation and Zoetrope Productions.
Mick Fleetwood	British musician	Chapter 7	1984	Assets of $2,404,430 against debt of $3,697,163. Among the causes of bankruptcy were impulsive real estate purchases and failed investments.
George Clinton	American singer	Chapter 7	1984	Clinton claims that the bankruptcy was "fictitious" — part of a conspiracy to deprive him of his income.
Ronald Isley	American musician	Chapter 11	1984 or 1987	The case was later converted to Chapter 7.
Ronald Isley	American musician	Chapter 11	1997	The case was converted to Chapter 7 in 1998. He was discharged in 2001. In 2005, he was convicted for tax evasion and sentenced to three years and one month in prison.
Jay Black	American singer	—	1985	Caused by unpaid taxes in connection with his gambling addiction.
John Connally	Governor of Texas and Treasury Secretary	Chapter 11	1987	At the same time, his real estate investment firm filed for Chapter 7 bankruptcy. The bankruptcy was caused by unsuccessful investments.
Andy Gibb	English singer	Chapter 7	1987	Assets of less than $50,000 against debt of more than $1,000,000. He died six months later due to a viral infection.
Sylvia Browne	American author	—	1988	—
Jerry Lee Lewis	American musician	Chapter 7	1988	His bankruptcy petition listed total liabilities of $3,000,000 including $2,000,000 of unpaid taxes in addition to medical and personal debts.
Tammy Wynette	American musicians	Chapter 11	1988	They owed over $1,000,000. The couple filed for joint bankruptcy as a result of a bad investment in two Florida shopping centers.
George Richey	American musicians	Chapter 11	1988	They owed over $1,000,000. The couple filed for joint bankruptcy as a result of a bad investment in two Florida shopping centers.
Vinnie Vincent	American rock musician	Chapter 11	1989	His creditors included Gene Simmons and Paul Stanley.
Vinnie Vincent	American rock musician	Chapter 13 (withdrawn)	2008	Caused by lost lawsuit against his former band, Kiss. He withdrew the bankruptcy petition after an appeal in which third parties wanted to convert the bankruptcy to Chapter 7.
Willie Nelson	American musician	Chapter 11	1990	He owed $16–32 million to the IRS during the 1980s. $16 million in his assets was seized by the IRS before the bankruptcy. His IRS debt was later settled at a discount rate.
Melba Moore	American singer and actress	—	1990s	The bankruptcy followed her divorce from Charles Huggins who also sued her and The Daily News newspaper for libel.
Gary Kurtz	American film producer	—	1990s	The bankruptcy was reportedly related to the financial failure of the film Slipstream and let to its release into the public domain.
Merle Haggard	American musician	Chapter 11	1992	The bankruptcy followed a series of failed businesses and divorces.
Cathy Lee Crosby	American actress	—	1992	According to her autobiography, Let the Magic Begin, Crosby filed for bankruptcy to stop a lawsuit by her former husband Joe Theismann demanding half of her assets.
Wayne Newton	American singer	Chapter 11	1992	He owed $20,000,000, $8.3 million of which was owed to Northeastern Bank of Pennsylvania, as a result of bad investments in the 1980s.
Eddie "The Eagle" Edwards	British ski jumper	—	1992	The bankruptcy followed his inability to pay a tax bill due to a failure of his trust fund. He subsequently sued the trustees for mismanagement and won a settlement of around £100,000.
Lorrie Morgan	American singer	Chapter 11	1992	She owed more than $846,000. The creditors were repaid in full, and the bankruptcy petition was withdrawn.
Lorrie Morgan	American singer	Chapter 7	2008	Assets of $500,000-$1,000,000 against debt of $1,000,000-$10,000,000. She described the bankruptcy as a "necessary part" of "restructuring" her business.
Kim Basinger	American actress	Chapter 11	1993	Assets of $2,000,000-$3,000,000 against debt of over $11,000,000. The bankruptcy followed a judgement awarding Main Line Pictures $8,100,000 against her for walking away from the movie Boxing Helena. The case was eventually settled for $3,800,000. The bankruptcy was later converted to Chapter 7. Her assets included a large portion of the town Braselton, Georgia.
Fife Symington	Governor of Arizona	Chapter 7	1995	Assets of $61,000 against debt of more than $24,000,000, including $10,000,000 borrowed from union pension funds. The bankruptcy was caused by failed real estate investments. He was charged with defrauding his lenders and convicted in 1997. The conviction was overturned in 1999 and he was pardoned by President Bill Clinton in 2001.
Susan Powter	American motivational speaker	Chapter 11	1995	Assets of $500,000-$999,000 against debt of up to $1,000,000 owed to Time Warner video unit and around $500,000 of other debt. The bankruptcy was caused by legal costs.
La Toya Jackson	American singer	Chapter 11	1995	Assets of less than $50,000 against debt of $500,000-$1,000,000. The bankruptcy was caused by her unsuccessful singing career and $650,000 in damages claimed by Moulin Rouge for ending her contract early.
Dorothy Hamill	American figure skater	Chapter 11	1996	Assets of $1,300,000 against debt of $1,600,000.
Vickie Lynn Hogan (known as Anna Nicole Smith)	American model and actress	Chapter 11	1996	Her assets included jewelry worth nearly $1,000,000. The bankruptcy was a result of a $830,000 judgment against her in a sexual harassment lawsuit brought by her former nanny. Her claim to her deceased husband's estate, worth hundreds of millions of dollars, was the subject of a lengthy litigation culminating in two Supreme Court cases, Marshall v. Marshall and after her death, Stern v. Marshall.
Stanley Kirk Burrell (known as MC Hammer)	American rapper	Chapter 11	1996	Assets of $1,000,000 against debt of over $13,000,000. The bankruptcy was attributed to his extravagant lifestyle and decreasing album sales. The case was converted to Chapter 7 in 1998.
Burt Reynolds	American actor	Chapter 11	1996	He owed more than $10,000,000. The bankruptcy followed a divorce and a failed business venture.
Anita Bryant	American singer	Chapter 11	1997	Her debts included more than $172,000 in unpaid state and federal taxes. In 2001, her business went bankrupt, leaving behind unpaid employees and creditors.
Corey Haim	Canadian actor	Chapter 11	1997	Assets of $40,000 against debt of over $200,000, including state and federal taxes, and medical expenses.
Keith Famie	American TV producer	Chapter 7	1997	Assets of $6,353 against debt of $274,100.
Mindy McCready	American singer	Chapter 7	1997	Caused by a litigation over management and publishing agreements.
Debbie Reynolds	American actress	Chapter 11	1997	The bankruptcy followed a failure to sell her company Debbie Reynolds Hotel and Casino, which filed for Chapter 11 on the same day.
Burt Prelutsky	American screenwriter	—	1997	Caused by inability to find work.
Lynne Spears	American author, mother of Britney Spears	—	1998	She filed for bankruptcy together with her husband.
Toni Braxton	American singer	Chapter 7	1998	She owed $3,900,000. Three of her companies filed for Chapter 7 bankruptcy at the same time.
Toni Braxton	American singer	Chapter 7	2010	Assets of $1,000,000-$10,000,000 against debt of $10,000,000-$50,000,000. The bankruptcy was precipitated by medical problems.
William Roache	English actor	IA 1986	1999	He owed £300,000. The bankruptcy was caused by legal costs from a libel suit he started.
Gary Coleman	American actor	Chapter 7	1999	He owed $72,000.
Debelah Morgan	American singer	—	1999	She filed for bankruptcy after two failed albums.
Sherman Hemsley	American actor	Chapter 13	1999	He owed over $1,000,000. His creditors included the IRS and a Nevada investment corporation.
Elizabeth Gracen	American actress and model	—	1999	She owed $194,000.
Heidi Fleiss	American madam	Chapter 11	1999	Assets of $5,200 against debt of $270,000. The bankruptcy followed a prison sentence on charges related to running a call-girl service.
Lorraine Bracco	American actress	Chapter 11	1999	The debts included legal fees from a custody battle.
Ashley MacIsaac	Canadian fiddler	Canadian law	2000	Assets of $119,000 against debt of $305,000, mostly unpaid taxes.
Mike Tyson	American boxer	Chapter 11	2003	Assets of $10,000,000-$50,000,000 against debt of over $27,000,000. His biggest creditors were the US and British tax authorities, whom he owed a total of $17,400,000.
Sheryl Swoopes	American basketball player	Chapter 13	2004	Caused by "bad investments". She owed $711,050, including $275,000 to the Internal Revenue Service.
Michael Barrymore	English comedian	IA 1986	2004	Caused by unpaid taxes.
Lorenzo Lamas	American actor	Chapter 7	2004	Assets of $433,000 against debt of $617,000, including nearly $200,000 for a private airplane. He filed for bankruptcy after the cancellation of his television show The Immortal.
Lorenzo Lamas	American actor	Chapter 7	2014	Assets of $9,100 against debt of $322,000. The debt included $285,000 in state and federal taxes and nearly $20,000 in domestic support.
Chris Eubank	British boxer	IA 1986	2005	He was made bankrupt due to a tax debt of £1,300,000.
Jim Davidson	English comedian	IA 1986	2006	The bankruptcy followed his failure to keep payments on a £1,400,000 tax bill, of which £700,000 was outstanding at the time of bankruptcy.
Sammy Kershaw	American musician	Chapter 13	2007	Assets of $100,001-$1,000,000 against debt in the same range, primarily business-related.
Willie Aames	American actor	Chapter 7	2008	He owed $350,000.
Michael Vick	American football player	Chapter 11	2008	Assets of $16,000,000 against debt of $20,400,000. The bankruptcy followed his trial and prison sentence for organizing dog fighting.
Stephen Baldwin	American actor	Chapter 11	2009	Assets of more than $1,100,000 against debt of more than $2,300,000. The debt included $1,200,000 on mortgages and more than $1,000,000 in unpaid taxes.
Lenny Dykstra	American baseball player	Chapter 11	2009	Assets of less than $50,000 against debt of $10,000,000-$50,000,000. In 2010, the case was converted to Chapter 7. In 2012, Dykstra was sentenced to six and a half month in federal prison for bankruptcy fraud, concealment of assets, and money laundering.
Kerry Katona	English singer	IA 1986 (bankruptcy)	2008	The bankruptcy was caused by her failure to pay the final £82,000 of a £417,000 tax bill
Kerry Katona	English singer	IA 1986 (bankruptcy)	2013	She declared the second bankruptcy a few months after an advertising campaign featuring her, which suggested that payday loans could help fund a celebrity lifestyle, was banned by an industry regulator.
Joe Swash	television personality	IA 1986	2009	He was made bankrupt due to his failure to pay £20,000 of a £120,000 tax bill.
Joe Swash	television personality	IA 1986	2013	He made bankrupt by the HMRC.
Antoine Walker	American basketball player	Chapter 7	2010	Assets of $4,000,000 against debt of $12,870,000.
Derrick Coleman	American basketball player	Chapter 7	2010	He owed $4,700,000 due to failed investments.
Dick Smothers	American actor and comedian	Chapter 11	2010	Assets of $2,000,000 and debts of $2,800,000 resulting from a failed real estate investment.
Lauren Booth	British journalist	IA 1986	2010	Failure to manage her financial affairs. She went bankrupt twice.
John Ignatius Quinn (known as Seán Quinn)	Irish businessman	IA 1986	2011	The bankruptcy was annulled after appeal by his creditor, the Irish Bank Resolution Corporation (formerly Anglo Irish Bank), which successfully challenged the location of Quinn's centre of main interest.
John Ignatius Quinn (known as Seán Quinn)	Irish businessman	Irish Law	2012	The application was filed by the Irish Bank Resolution Corporation.
Arnold Klein	American dermatologist	Chapter 11	2011	Assets of $6,000,000 against debt of $8,400,000.
Rulon Gardner	American wrestler	Chapter 7	2012	Assets of over $430,000 against debt of $2,934,000.
Jose Canseco	baseball player	Chapter 7	2012	Assets of $21,000 against debt of $1,700,000, of which over $500,000 was owed to the IRS.
Gary Busey	American actor	Chapter 7	2012	Assets of less than $50,000 against debt of $500,000-$1,000,000. His creditors included the IRS, Wells Fargo, Santa Monica UCLA Medical Center, and a storage company.
Nicole Eggert	American actress	Chapter 13	2013	Assets of $1,076,400 against debt of $807,115. Filed twice before, but the attempts were dismissed.
Dionne Warwick	American singer	Chapter 7	2013	Assets of around $25,000 against debt including nearly $10,000,000 in unpaid taxes.
Aaron Carter	American singer	Chapter 7	2013	Assets of $8,232.16 against debt of over $3,500,000, mostly unpaid taxes.
Richard Rawson (known as Fazer)	English rapper	IA 1986	2013	Caused by unpaid taxes.
Nick Griffin	British politician	IA 1986	2013	The petition was filed by his former solicitors whom he owed £120,000 in fees and costs.
Janice Dickinson	American model	Chapter 7	2013	She owed nearly $1,000,000, mostly unpaid taxes.
David Adkins (known as Sinbad)	American comedian and actor	Chapter 7	2013	Assets of $131,000 against debt of $11,000,000, including $8,300,000 owed to the IRS. He previously filed for bankruptcy in 2009 and 2010, but the cases were dismissed.
Drake Bell	American actor	Chapter 7	2013	Asset of $1,585,500 against debt of $2,166,000.
Calum Best	British-American model	IA 1986	2013	He was made bankrupt by the HMRC over unpaid taxes.
Kelly Rutherford	American actress	Chapter 7	2013	Assets of $23,937 against debt of $2,021,832. The bankruptcy was a result of a divorce and child custody litigation.
Debi Thomas	American figure skater	Chapter 7	2014	She owed more than $600,000.
Anita Harris	English actress	IA 1986	2014	She was made bankrupt by the HMRC, to which she owed more than £14,000.
Jade Ewen	English singer	IA 1986	2014	The bankruptcy included unpaid taxes.
Kristina Laferne Roberts (known as Zane)	American author	Chapter 7	2014	Assets of more than $1,400,000 against debt of more than $3,400,000.
Teri Polo	American actress	Chapter 11	2014	Assets of less than $50,000 against debt of nearly $1,000,000, including $772,000 in unpaid taxes.
David James	English footballer	IA 1986	2014	The bankruptcy followed his divorce. His collection of football memorabilia was subsequently auctioned off.
Jack Johnson	American hockey player	Chapter 11	2014	Assets of less than $50,000 against debt of more than $10,000,000. The bankruptcy followed defaulting on high-interest loans and three lawsuits against Johnson.
Chris Sutton	English footballer	—	2014	He owed more than £330,000.
Christian Nadé	French footballer	sequestration under the Scottish law	2014	The bankruptcy was caused by debt related to car purchases.
Donna D'Errico	American actress	Chapter 7	2014	Assets of $414,000 against debt of $947,000. The debt consisted mostly of legal fees from a divorce and custody litigation against Nikki Sixx.
Willie Thorne	English snooker player	IA 1986	2015	Debt of £601,204. The bankruptcy was a result of spending borrowed money on gambling. In 2016, he was given a 6-year Bankruptcy Restrictions Order for borrowing money "he had no reasonable expectation of repaying".
Clinton Portis	American football player	Chapter 11	2015	Assets of $13,290,000 million, including $10,000,000 in legal claims against debt of $5,000,000, including domestic support, back taxes, money owed to MGM Grand casino, to Borgata and to his mother.
David Cassidy	American actor	Chapter 11	2015	Assets of $3,714,913 against debt of $2,143,367.97.
Lee Ryan	English singer	IA 1986	2015	He was made bankrupt by a debt collection company.
50 Cent	American rapper	Chapter 11	2015	Assets of $10,000,000-$50,000,000 against debt of $32,509,549.91. Legal fees and judgments exceeding $20 million over the past year were the primary cause of the filing. See also 50 Cent, Bankruptcy.
David Silveria	American metal musician	Chapter 11	2015	Assets consisting of real property valued at $1,050,134, and $60,500 of personal property including ownership interest in a restaurant and Family Values Tour Music Festival. Secured debts include first and second mortgages, tax liens, and judgment liens totaling $2,451,826. Unsecured debts include tax debt and general consumer debt totaling $117,272. Case was dismissed within eight months.
Ewen MacIntosh	English actor	IA 1986	2016	He was made bankrupt by the HMRC.
Gail Porter	Scottish TV presenter	IA 1986	2016	She was made bankrupt by the HMRC due to over £100,000 of unpaid taxes.
Karen Millen	founder of Karen Millen Fashions	IA 1986	2016	She was made bankrupt by the HMRC due to about £6,000,000 of debt arising from her involvement in a tax avoidance scheme. In the bankruptcy files, she was described as "unemployed fashion designer, formerly a company director".
F. Lee Bailey	American attorney	Chapter 7	2016	Assets of $408,176 against debt of over $5,500,000. The bankruptcy was caused by a tax debt of nearly $5,200,000 related to his handling of a client's stock shares, which also led to his disbarment in 2001.
Dean Windass	English footballer	IA 1986	2016	He was made bankrupt by the HMRC, to which he owed £150,000.
Boris Becker	German tennis player	IA 1986	2017	The petition was filed by one of his creditors, Arbuthnot Latham.
Thomas Derbyshire (known as Tommy Cannon)	English comedian	IA 1986	2017	He claimed he couldn't pay a £80,000 tax bill.
Liz Jones	British journalist	IA 1986	2017	—
Lil' Kim	American rapper	Chapter 13 converted to Chapter 11	2018	She filed a Chapter 13 in order to stop a foreclousre of her New Jersey home valued at $2,300,000. Both her secured and unsecured debts each totaled more than $2,000,000 which made her ineligible to be a debtor under Chapter 13. She converted her case to Chapter 11 and then dismissed the case shortly thereafter.
Gail Zeiler (known as Kacey Jones)	American musician	—	—	—
Richard Harris	Irish actor	—	—	He was declared bankrupt twice.
Gary Brackett	Athlete	Chapter 7	—	$2 million in assets and $5.8 million in liabilities, most of those unsecured business debts
