= Modified universalism =

Principle of international insolvency law

In relation to corporate insolvency, modified universalism or modified universality is a legal concept (particularly an English legal concept) relating to the general principle that national courts should strive to administer the estates of insolvent companies in the spirit of international comity. The broad concept is that it is desirable for cross-border insolvencies to be managed by a single officeholder as a single estate rather than a series of piecemeal and unconnected proceedings in different countries, and that this should be recognised globally. In practice, whilst many countries will recognise foreign bankruptcy proceedings, in many instances the courts have set some limits on the recognition of insolvency proceedings, such that the courts apply this principle of modified universality whereby the courts retain a discretion to assess whether the overseas proceedings are consistent with their own principles of justice and public policy. But, subject to that safeguard, the courts will generally defer to the proceedings which are regarded as the "main proceedings" for the purposes of getting in and distributing assets of the insolvent company. The principal is referred as to modified universalism in that it strives to find a balance between purely territorial bankruptcy systems, and entirely universal international bankruptcy system.

Credit for the invention of the modern term is usually given to Professor Jay Westbrook.

The concept of modified universalism broadly underpins the UNCITRAL Model Law on Cross-Border Insolvency, and the EC Insolvency Regulation on Insolvency Proceedings (Council Regulation (EC) No 1346/2000). Similarly, Chapter 15 of the US Bankruptcy Code (which is based upon the UNCITRAL Model Law) is heavily predicated on the concept of modified universalism.

[T]he United States in ancillary bankruptcy cases has embraced an approach to international insolvency which is a modified form of universalism accepting the central premise of universalism, that is, that assets should be collected and distributed on a worldwide basis, but reserving to local courts discretion to evaluate the fairness of home country procedures and to protect the interests of local creditors.

The concepts of universalism and modified universalism have, predictably, shifted and evolved over time. In English law the concept of universalism is usually used in contrast to the alternative theory of judicial cooperation in cross-border insolvencies referred to as the doctrine of unity. As has been judicially noted: "The meaning of the expression 'universalism' has undergone a change since the time it was first used in the 19th century, and it later came to be contrasted with the 'doctrine of unity.' In 1834 Story referred to the theory that assignments under bankrupt or insolvent laws were, and ought to be, of universal operation to transfer movable property, in whatever country it might be situate, and concluded that there was great wisdom in adopting the rule that an assignment in bankruptcy should operate as a complete and valid transfer of all his movable property abroad, as well as at home, and for a country to prefer an attaching domestic creditor to a foreign assignee or to foreign creditors could 'hardly be deemed consistent with the general comity of nations ... [T]he true rule is, to follow out the lead of the general principle that makes the law of the owner's domicil conclusive upon the disposition of his personal property,' citing Solomons v Ross as supporting that doctrine: Story, Commentaries on the Conflict of Laws, 1st ed (1834), pp 340-341, para 406."

== Codification ==
A number of countries throughout the world have sought to apply some form of modified universalism through passing statutes or other forms of codified laws. As noted above, US bankruptcy law substantially implements the principles of modified universalism in the adoption of the UNCITRAL Model Law in Chapter 15. In the United Kingdom the same UNCITRAL Model Law has been substantially implemented by way of the Cross-Border Insolvency Regulations 2006 (SI 2006/1030). In addition to the United States and the United Kingdom, approximately 17 other countries have adopted cross-border insolvency laws modelled on the UNCITRAL Model Law, including Canada, Japan and Australia.

In the member states of the European Union, other than Denmark, a variation of the doctrine applies under the auspices of EC Insolvency Regulation on Insolvency Proceedings.

In other jurisdictions various forms of ad hoc cross-border cooperation exist on the basis of a foreign main proceeding.

== Common law ==
Under the common law (i.e. in the absence of specific statutory provisions in countries which are based upon common law systems) the main proponent of the concept in recent times has been Lord Hoffman. In HIH [2008] 1 WLR 852 he said:

The primary rule of private international law which seems to me applicable to this case is the principle of (modified) universalism, which has been the golden thread running through English cross-border insolvency law since the 18th century. That principle requires that English courts should, so far as is consistent with justice and UK public policy, co-operate with the courts in the country of the principal liquidation to ensure that all the company's assets are distributed to its creditors under a single system of distribution. That is the purpose of the power to direct remittal.

=== Evolution of the concept ===
The concept of some form of universalism is not a modern innovation. In English law in cases as ancient as Solomons v Ross (1764) 1 H Bl 131n and Re African Farms 1906 TS 373 there has been tacit recognition of the principle. In Galbraith v Grimshaw [1910] AC 508 Lord Dunedin stated that there should be only one universal process of the distribution of a bankrupt's property and that, where such a process was pending elsewhere, the English courts should not allow steps to be taken in its jurisdiction which would interfere with that process. However, bankruptcy laws have for the most part historically developed along territorial lines, and in many jurisdictions those insolvency laws were outstripped by the development of international business.

The more recent focus on the principle was driven by the more recent decisions of the Privy Council by the decisions in HIH and Cambridge Gas, predominantly through the efforts of Lord Hoffman. In the latter case Lord Hoffman opined:

The English common law has traditionally taken the view that fairness between creditors requires that, ideally, bankruptcy proceedings should have universal application. There should be a single bankruptcy in which all creditors are entitled and required to prove. No one should have an advantage because he happens to live in a jurisdiction where more of the assets or fewer of the creditors are situated.

Commentary on the decisions was mixed. Whilst some legal commentators applauded the attempt to develop a system of comity to ensure the fair treatment of claimants in international bankruptcies, others criticised the decision for subverting domestic law and for the unstructured and philosophical reasoning which lead to broad principles rather than defined rules. Concern was expressed that in his judgments Lord Hoffman sought to apply broad aspirational principles rather than specific rules. In Cambridge Gas he relied upon the availability of a scheme of arrangement under Manx law as a basis for recognising a Chapter 11 judgments in the United States where the US court had not been in a position to exercise jurisdiction over all of the parties. Lord Hoffman rationalised this on the basis that the purpose of insolvency is not to determine rights (like a conventional civil judgment) but rather to implement a system for the administration of claims. His judgments were also criticised for simply assuming the doctrine of corporate personality should be disregarded in such circumstances.

The Supreme Court of Ireland declined to follow Cambridge Gas and HIH in its decision in In re Flightlease (Ireland) Ltd [2012] IESC 12.

=== The Rubin decision ===
The momentum which was generated towards a broad modified universalism at common law was abruptly arrested in a subsequent majority decision of the Privy Council in Rubin v Eurofinance SA. The leading judgment was given by Lord Collins, with whom Lord Sumption and Lord Walker agreed. In particular they rejected Lord Hoffman's suggestion that the availability of a scheme of arrangement under domestic law made it appropriate to recognise the Chapter 11 relief from abroad. Lord Collins stated: "although statute law may influence the policy of the common law, it cannot be assumed, simply because there would be a statutory power to make a particular order in the case of domestic insolvency, that a similar power must exist at common law. So far a Cambridge Gas suggests otherwise, the Board is satisfied that it is wrong". Lord Collins amplified that "to apply insolvency legislation by analogy 'as if' it applied, even though it does not actually apply, would go so far beyond the traditional judicial development of the common law as to be a plain usurpation of the legislative function".

They also rejected the earlier statements of Lord Hoffman that insolvency proceedings were, by their nature, different from civil claims. Accordingly, as a result of Rubin, whether or not a judgment of a foreign court in insolvency proceedings will be recognised or not will depend upon the ordinary principles of recognition of foreign judgments in the law of the relevant forum - there are no special rules for insolvency proceedings.

Although substantially overruling his judgments, Lord Collins in Rubin described Lord Hoffman's opinion in Cambridge Gas as "brilliantly expressed" and his speech in HIH as "equally brilliant".

=== The Singularis decision ===
The Privy Council further reconsidered these issues in Singularis Holdings Ltd v PricewaterhouseCoopers. In that case, Lord Sumption asserted "In the Board's opinion, the principle of modified universalism is part of the common law," before clarifying: "but it is necessary to bear in mind, first, that it is subject to local law and local public policy and, secondly, that the court can only ever act within the limits of its own statutory and common law powers." He later added: "The principle of modified universalism is a recognised principle of the common law. It is founded on the public interest in the ability of foreign courts exercising insolvency jurisdiction in the place of the company's incorporation to conduct an orderly winding up of its affairs on a world-wide basis, notwithstanding the territorial limits of their jurisdiction." Lord Clarke added supportive comments, but Lord Mance struck a more skeptical tone, construing the principle as more limited in ambit and effect. In that decision Lord Mance and Lord Neuberger formed the minority opinion.

=== Non-English common law ===
Although the cases of HIH, Cambridge Gas and Rubin are all treated as stating principles of English law, curiously each one of the decisions is a decision of the Privy Council on appeal from another common law jurisdiction (HIH was on appeal from Bermuda, Cambridge Gas was on appeal from the Isle of Man, and Rubin and Singularis were both on appeal from the Cayman Islands).

=== Current position ===
Although there have been some knee-jerk reactions to the Rubin decision as heralding the death of modified universalism, it is important to keep the decision in context. Modified universalism as a concept is still a fundamental part of a number of codified legal systems, whatever the limits applied to the common law doctrine in Rubin.

Furthermore, it is important to remember that the series of decisions in Cambridge Gas, HIH and Rubin focused on two relatively narrow points of the doctrine, namely: (1) whether a judgment of a foreign court in relation to the proper administration insolvency proceedings should be binding against persons who were not party to that judgment (to which Rubin has decisively answered "no"), and (2) whether a creditor who lodges a claim in liquidation proceedings administered by the court is taken to have submitted to the jurisdiction of that court (to which Rubin indicates the answer is "maybe"). But treating the Rubin decision as stating some wider principle is danger, particularly as the Privy Council was keen to move away from wide statements of principle and focus on narrow and fact specific rules. Indeed, in Rubin the Privy Council stressed that the common law still generally favours universalism.
