= British Virgin Islands bankruptcy law =

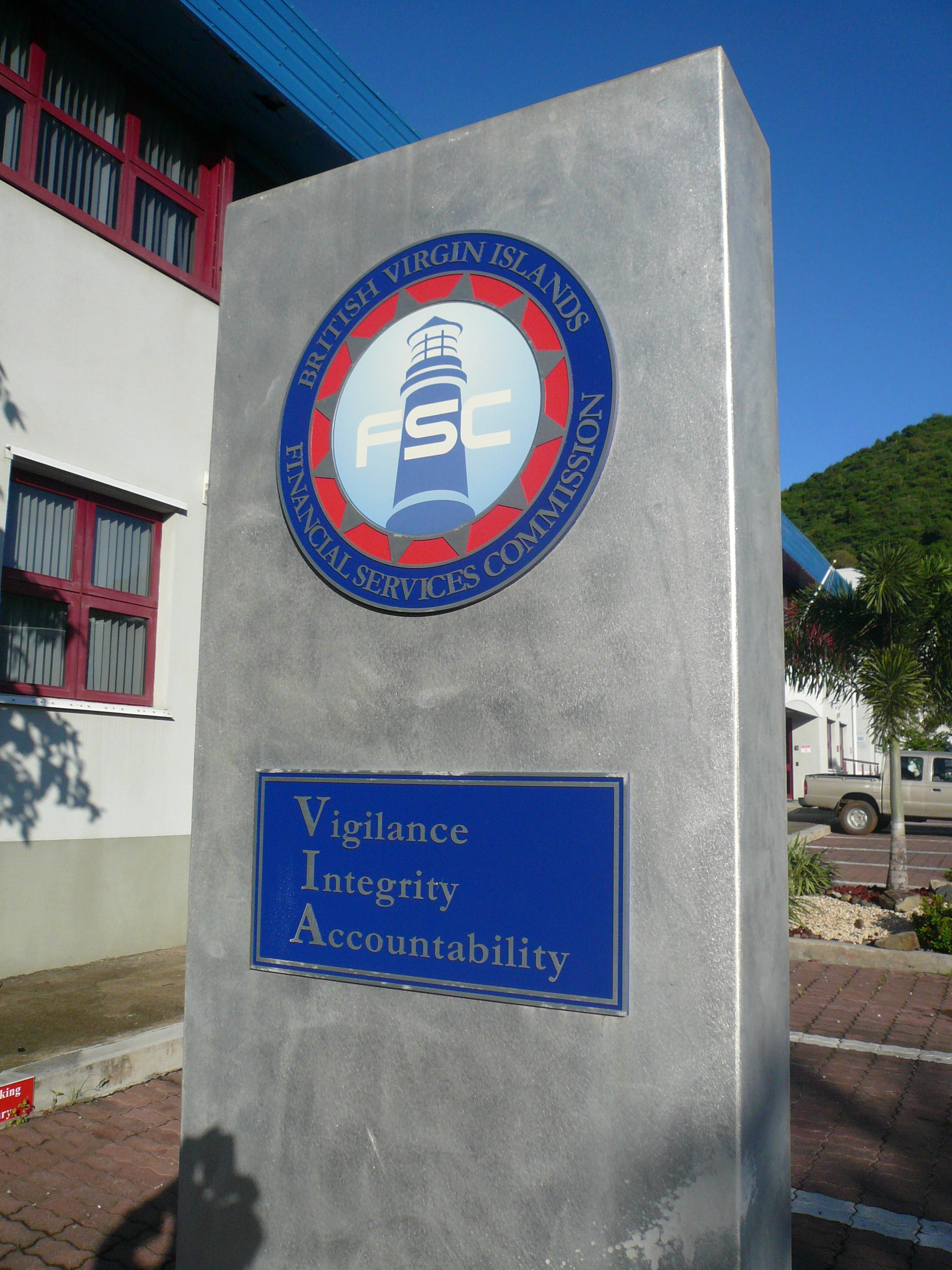
The British Virgin Islands Financial Services Commission has responsibility for oversight of insolvency practitioners.

British Virgin Islands bankruptcy law is principally codified in the Insolvency Act, 2003, and to a lesser degree in the Insolvency Rules, 2005. Most of the emphasis of bankruptcy law in the British Virgin Islands relates to corporate insolvency rather than personal bankruptcy. As an offshore financial centre, the British Virgin Islands has many times more resident companies than citizens, and accordingly the courts spend more time dealing with corporate insolvency and reorganisation.

The Insolvency Act largely eschews the rescue culture and emphasises the protection of creditors' rights (and in particular secured creditors' rights) over other stakeholders in a bankruptcy and the rehabilitation and protection of businesses as a going concern. This reflects the large number of structured finance vehicles incorporated in the jurisdiction which employ leveraged finance, but do not otherwise trade or have any employees.

The bankruptcy of individuals is usually referred to as "personal bankruptcy" in the British Virgin Islands, whereas the bankruptcy of corporations is referred to as "corporate insolvency". The legislation largely deals with both separately, although there are some common provisions.

== History ==
Prior to the Insolvency Act coming into force on 1 January 2004, bankruptcy legislation in the British Virgin Islands was divided between the Bankruptcy Act (Cap 8) and the Companies Act (Cap 285). The previous legislation was largely piecemeal and eventually resulted in a comprehensive review which led to the enactment of the 2003 statute.

After the coming into force of the Insolvency Act 2003 (and the repeal of earlier legislation), the country had to wait nearly 18 months for the Insolvency Rules 2005 to come into force. In practice, this meant that no bankruptcies were possible, because the delegation of certain key provisions, including the particulars of preferred creditors, were deferred to the rules.

== Bankruptcy ==
Where an individual is unable to pay or provide for his debts he may be placed in bankruptcy by an order of the court.

A court in the British Virgin Islands may make a bankruptcy order against an individual if:

1. that person is unable to pay his debts as they fall due;
2. the unsecured liabilities of the debtor exceed the prescribed minimum; and
3. the value of the debtor's assets available for distribution exceeds the prescribed minimum.

In order to make an application for an order it is necessary to show that on the date of the application the debtor was:

1. resident, present or carrying on business in the British Virgin Islands;
2. the debtor has or appears to have assets in the British Virgin Islands; or
3. that there is a reasonable prospect that the making of a bankruptcy order will benefit the creditors of the debtor.

Once appointed pursuant to an order the trustee in bankruptcy will collect in the assets of the debtor except for certain special assets protected by law, sell those assets and then distribute the proceeds to the creditors of the bankrupt pari passu. That distribution discharges the claims of the creditors against the bankrupt individual and all other creditors who would have claimed in the bankruptcy. The individual is thereafter discharged from bankruptcy.

== Liquidation ==
Where a company is unable to pay or provide for its debts it may be placed in liquidation either voluntary by a resolution of members or compulsorily by an order of the court. British Virgin Islands law uses the phrase "in liquidation" in preference to the term "winding-up" used in other jurisdictions.

A company is treated as insolvent, and liable to have a liquidator appointed if:

1. it is unable to pay its debts as they fall due;
2. the value of its liabilities exceeds the value of its assets;
3. it fails to discharge a statutory demand for the prescribed minimum; or
4. it fails to pay a judgment debt of the British Virgin Islands court.

Liquidation is a class right, and so the court will not make an order if it is opposed by a majority of creditors.

Once a liquidator is appointed, his duty is to collect all of the assets of the company, liquidate them and pay or provide for the claims of the company's creditors pari passu. Once a liquidator is appointed, creditors may not commence or continue legal proceedings against the company.

At the conclusion of the liquidation, the company is dissolved.

Where the assets of the company are in jeopardy, or where the company has engaged in misconduct, it is possible to seek the appointment of a provisional liquidator.

== Set-off and subordination ==
For both individual and creditors, where any creditor also owes money a company or an individual who goes into liquidation or bankruptcy, then upon the making of the order the sums due between the parties are set-off so that only a net sum due is owed either to the creditor or the insolvent party. However, the benefit of that provision can be waived by the creditor so long as any waiver does not operate to the prejudice of other creditors. Where a person has actual notice of the insolvency of another party at the time they extended credit, they cannot set-off any obligations owed if that other party subsequently goes into bankruptcy.

Creditors of a person are entitled to enter into subordination agreement to reorder the priority of claims against an insolvent party upon the bankruptcy of that party.

The Insolvency Act has incorporated ISDA Model Netting legislation (pre-2007 form) and so any netting agreement relating to financial contracts will prevail over the statutory insolvency set-off provisions. Financial contracts for these purposes are defined in some detail in the Insolvency Rules.

== Secured creditors ==
The Insolvency Act is "predicated heavily towards the protection of secured creditors' rights". Secured creditors are not ordinarily subject to the usual stays and delays on creditors' rights when enforcing a valid security interest.

Similarly, provisions such as creditors' arrangements and recognition of foreign insolvency representatives are circumscribed to the extent that they interfere with the rights of secured creditors.

== Restructuring ==
Although the Insolvency Act does not focus on rehabilitation of financially distressed companies, the legislation does contain various provisions for corporate rescue.

Part II of the Insolvency Act provides for creditors' arrangements, whereby the creditors of an individual or a company may, by a 75% vote, approve an arrangement which may enable the company to continue trading. This is subject to the rights of the secured and preferred creditors.

Part III of the Insolvency Act deals with administration orders, designed to enable a trading company to have breathing space to deal with its creditors. If a company had granted a floating charge the court may not make an administration order without the consent of the holder.

A company may also enter into a scheme of arrangement whereby a compromise between the company and its creditors may be sanctioned by the court if approved by 75% in value and a majority in number of the company's creditors.

== Voidable transactions ==
For both personal and corporate bankruptcy, the Insolvency Act provides that certain transactions entered into in the "twilight" period prior to bankruptcy may be challenged by a liquidator by application to the court.

Voidable transactions
Type	Vulnerability period	Insolvency requirement?	Description
Unfair preference	2 years for connected persons, 6 months otherwise	Yes	Any transaction has the effect of putting the creditor into a position which, in the event of the individual becoming a bankrupt, will be better than the position he would have been in if the transaction had not been entered into
Undervalue transaction	2 years for connected persons, 6 months otherwise	Yes	A transaction for the consideration received is worth significantly less than the value of the consideration provided by the bankrupt
Voidable floating charge / general assignment	2 years for connected persons, 6 months otherwise	Yes	Any floating charge (for companies) or general assignment (for individuals)
Extortionate credit transaction	5 years	No	Credit which require grossly exorbitant payments to be made, or otherwise grossly contravenes ordinary principles of fair trading

In each case (except for extortionate credit) the bankrupt must have either been insolvent at the time of entering into the transaction or the transaction must have caused them to become insolvent.

The relevant vulnerability period is the period prior to the commencement of liquidation (for companies) or the presentation of a petition for a bankruptcy order (in the case of individuals). The vulnerability period is extended for transactions involving persons who are connected persons to the bankrupt.

The voidable transactions regime contains certain provisions designed to protect bona fide attempts to provide credit to financially distressed companies and individuals. These provisions are presumed not to apply to transactions involving connected persons.

== Insolvency practitioners ==
Insolvency practitioners are required to be licensed in the British Virgin Islands in order to act as a liquidator, administrator, administrative receiver or supervisor of a creditors' arrangement. A foreign insolvency practitioner may act jointly with a licensed insolvency practitioner provided that (a) the Financial Services Commission has been notified in advance of the proposed appointment in writing and has not objected within the statutory time limit.

== Cross-border insolvency ==
Most corporate insolvencies in the British Virgin Islands involve a cross border element. The Insolvency Act contains two parts dealing with cross-border insolvency. Part XVIII is based upon the UNCITRAL Model Law on Cross-Border Insolvency, The provisions do not sit easily within the remaining structure of the Insolvency Act as they are predicated on the centre of main interest (or "COMI") concept, which is otherwise unknown under British Virgin Islands law, and that Part has not yet been brought into force. Part XIX deals with orders in aid of foreign insolvency proceedings. Those provisions have been utilised by the British Virgin Islands courts on a number of occasions, including most notably recognising and assisting Irving Picard in the British Virgin Islands during the Madoff investment scandal.
