= Hague v Nam Tai Electronics =

David Hague v Nam Tai Electronics Inc
- Court: Judicial Committee of the Privy Council
- Full case name: David Hague & Anor v Nam Tai Electronics Inc
- Decided: 28 February 2008
- Citation: [2008] UKPC 13

Case history
- Prior actions: David Hague v Nam Tai Electronics Inc & Others
- Appealed from: David Hague & Anor v Nam Tai Electronics Inc, HCVAP 2004/020, 2005/010 (Eastern Caribbean Supreme Court 16 January 2006).

Court membership
- Judges sitting: Lord Neuberger; Lord Bingham of Cornhill; Lord Scott of Foscote; Lord Rodger of Earlsferry; Baroness Hale of Richmond

Case opinions
- Decision by: Lord Scott of Foscote

Hague v Nam Tai Electronics refers to a pair of legal decisions of the Privy Council on appeal from the British Virgin Islands. The first was a unanimous decision given by Lord Hoffman, reported at [2006] UKPC 52, which focussed upon the anti-deprivation rule and secured creditor's rights. The second was a unanimous decision given by Lord Scott, reported at [2008] UKPC 13, and concerned the liability of a company liquidator. The second decision was much more widely reported.

Lord Bingham of Cornhill and Lord Rodger of Earlsferry sat on both appeals, but neither gave a judgment in either of them.

Separately in the saga, there was also a third application for leave to appeal to the Privy Council on another point, but leave was refused.

== Background ==
Nam Tai Electronics Inc. was a company incorporated in the British Virgin Islands under the International Business Companies Act and whose shares were listed on the New York Stock Exchange. It was carrying on business principally in China. Mr Robert Yuen and one of his associated companies, Tele-Art Inc. (also incorporated in the British Virgin Islands), collectively owned 823,635 of the issued shares of Nam Tai. On 10 November 1993 Mr Yuen and Tele-Art Inc. each executed deeds which created a security interest over their shares in Nam Tai in favour of the Bank of China as security for the obligations of Tele-Art Limited (a Hong Kong subsidiary of Tele-Art Inc.) to the bank.

On the very same day, 10 November 1993, an Irish government agency obtained a judgment against Tele-Art Inc. for US$799,079. However, it appears that no steps were taken to enforce that judgment debt.

Just under three years later, Tele-Art Limited defaulted on its obligations and on 5 August 1996 the Bank of China called on the security provided by Mr Yuen and Tele-Art Inc. This in turn led to an unusual chain of events as Mr Yuen and Tele-Art Inc. furiously fought to resist the bank's attempts to enforce its collateral.

== Hague v Nam Tai Electronics (No 1) ==
=== Subsequent facts ===
Then events took what Lord Hoffman described in his judgment as "an unusual turn". The Irish government agency in whom the judgment debt was vested (Forfás) assigned the judgment debt to Nam Tai. Accordingly, Nam Tai became a creditor of its main shareholder, Tele-Art Inc. Nam Tai then issued winding-up proceedings in the British Virgin Islands courts against Tele-Art Inc. and on 17 July 1998 the court made a winding-up order, and Mr David Hague, a partner in the Hong Kong office of PricewaterhouseCoopers, was appointed as the liquidator. After that, in the words of Lord Hoffman "Nam Tai then devised a scheme to destroy the Bank's security."

The board of directors of Nam Tai purported to amend the articles of association such that where any shareholder owes an unpaid judgment debt to the company, the company was entitled to redeem the shares of that shareholder and set-off the redemption proceeds against the judgment amount. Having done this, on 18 December 1998 Nam Tai purported to redeem the shares which had been charged to the Bank of China and set-off the proceeds against the judgment debt originally awarded to the Irish government.

Mr Hague as liquidator of Tele-Art Inc. sought declarations from the court as to the priority of the claims of Nam Tai, and if necessary orders setting aside the redemptions and rectifying the share register of the company.

=== The judgment ===
The Privy Council held that the scheme failed for two particular reasons (and noted that it might also have failed for other reasons as well). Firstly, the right to any redemption proceeds only arose after Tele-Art Inc. had gone into liquidation, and under British Virgin Islands insolvency law no set-off could arise where a person became a creditor after the commencement of winding-up. Secondly, Nam Tai had notice of the bank's security interest and accordingly any rights it acquired in relation to the shares were subject to the rights of the bank.

Lord Hoffman also made the order for rectification of the share register. He noted that under the terms of the article, even if one accepted the validity of the amendment, then it was not possible for the set-off right to be exercised against an insolvent shareholder and hence the entire redemption was irregular and would be set aside.

The bank applied for the shares to be re-registered in its name pursuant to its rights as chargee. Nam Tai objected on the basis that the bank had not previously applied for the shares to be registered in its name. Lord Hoffman waved off the objections noting that in the context of the litigation such an omission was not surprising, and countering that "such a course would be to deprive the Bank of one of its most important rights as mortgagee, namely the right to take possession of the security and exercise the power of sale at its own discretion. To take the power of sale out of the hands of the bank would in their Lordships' opinion damage the confidence which bankers should have in the willingness of the courts to uphold their security rights."

=== Commentary ===
The decision in Hague v Nam Tai Electronics (No 1) did not attract a great deal of academic or professional commentary, although it is referred in British Virgin Islands legal textbooks.

== Hague v Nam Tai Electronics (No 2) ==
=== Subsequent facts ===
Concurrently with the events in relation to Hague v Nam Tai (No 1), Nam Tai also made two separate applications to the court to have Mr Hague removed as the liquidator of Tele-Art Inc. The first failed at first instance and on appeal to the Eastern Caribbean Court of Appeal. The second was rendered obsolete when Mr Hague voluntarily resigned. However, after Mr Hague has resigned, Nam Tai then sought to bring proceedings against him and his firm, PricewaterhouseCoopers.

Nam Tai then issued the proceedings in the British Virgin Islands court claiming damages against Mr Hague and his firm for negligent conduct of the liquidation. Nam Tai sought the leave of the court ex parte (which was granted) to serve the proceedings out of the jurisdiction on Mr Hague and his firm. Mr Hague and PricewaterhouseCoopers then applied to the court to set aside the leave to serve out on two grounds: firstly, on forum non conveniens grounds on the basis that Hong Kong was the more appropriate jurisdiction, and secondly on the basis that the claim, as pleaded, did not disclose a "serious issue to be tried" as required by the Civil Procedure Rules.

=== Judgment ===
At each level the courts rejected the argument of forum non conveniens. Mr Hague had been appointed as a liquidator by the British Virgin Islands court, and this meant that he was also an officer of that court. Accordingly, that constituted an implicit submission to the jurisdiction to supervise and review his conduct. Having accepted the authority and the duty of the court, he could not later reject its jurisdiction to review his conduct. Notwithstanding that all of the acts complained of had occurred in Hong Kong, and that all of the relevant witnesses were in Hong Kong, the Court of Appeal had held that "once Mr Hague accepted the appointment of official liquidator, he submitted to the jurisdiction of the BVI court and I so hold." Lord Scott agreed, and added "complaints about Mr Hague's discharge of his duties as liquidator of TAI are complaints that, if they are to be litigated at all, ought to be litigated in the courts of the BVI, whose officer Mr Hague, as liquidator was. They [the Privy Council] are in agreement, also, that Mr Hague, having accepted appointment as liquidator of TAI, cannot contest the jurisdiction of the BVI courts to enquire into his conduct of the litigation."

However, in relation to whether there was a serious issue to be tried, Lord Scott reversed the courts below, and held that the claim as pleaded was unsustainable. The duty of a liquidator is the duty to act for the creditors as an entire class, and was not owed to any individual creditor. Lord Scott referred to a number of cases on the topic, including Kyrris v Oldham [2004] 1 BCLC 305, Peskin v Anderson [2001] 1 BCLC 372 and Grand Gain Investment Ltd v Borrelli [2006] HKCU 872. Lord Scott agreed with statements of Barma J in the last of those decisions that such a claim was "plainly and obviously unsustainable". Therefore, because the proceedings were bound to fail, even though the British Virgin Islands courts were the appropriate forum, leave to serve out of the jurisdiction should not have been granted.

Lord Scott noted that the claim failed because of the form that the action had taken. Under British Virgin Islands law it would have been possible for an individual creditor to bring proceedings for misfeasance or breach of trust (although not negligence) against a liquidator under section 191 of the Companies Act (Cap 285). Alternatively Nam Tai could have sought the leave of the court to bring a derivative action on behalf of Tele-Art Inc. against Mr Hague. But as it had done neither of those things the claims was not sustainable.

=== Commentary ===
The second decision of the Privy Council was much more widely reported and commented upon. One commentator expressed the view that "the decision is a robust one of wide import, entirely in line with case law cited in it."

== See also ==
- British Virgin Islands bankruptcy law
- British Virgin Islands company law
