= Chapter 15, Title 11, United States Code =

Bankruptcy law of the U.S.

Chapter 15, Title 11, United States Code is a chapter of the United States Bankruptcy Code that deals with jurisdiction in certain bankruptcy cases. Under Chapter 15, foreign bankruptcy proceedings can be recognised by US courts and foreign representatives can participate in domestic proceedings. This allows cooperation between the United States courts and the foreign courts, as well as other authorities of foreign countries involved in cross-border insolvency cases.

== Jurisdiction issues ==
It happens with increasing frequency that a bankruptcy proceeding in one country has a connection to assets or information located in another. Because of the involvement of multiple jurisdictions, unique problems arise, and in response, the United States enacted Section 304 of the U.S. Bankruptcy Code in 1978. Section 304 was repealed in 2005 and replaced with Chapter 15, titled "Ancillary and Other Cross Border Cases". This section has increased the range of options available in the United States in support of foreign bankruptcy proceedings.

== UNCITRAL ==
Chapter 15 incorporates the Model Law on Cross Border Insolvency drafted by the United Nations Commission on International Trade Law. The law provides solutions to problems which arise in connection with cross-border bankruptcy, allowing US courts to issue subpoenas, orders to turn over assets, stays on pending actions, and orders of other types as circumstances dictate. The ancillary proceeding permitted under Chapter 15 is often a more efficient and less costly alternative to initiating an independent bankruptcy proceeding in the United States.

Chapter 15 also avoids conflicts and establishes mechanisms for cooperation between US and foreign courts and representatives regarding proceedings which involve the same debtor.

== Discretionary assistance ==
Whether the US courts will extend the "additional assistance" sought in connection with a foreign proceeding under Chapter 15 is a matter of discretion.

The main consideration US courts will take into account in making this decision is whether the laws of the foreign jurisdiction violate the laws or public policy of the United States and whether the foreign courts conduct their proceedings according to basic rules of procedural fairness.

Among other factors the US courts will consider is how the foreign jurisdiction treats creditors, whether it prevents fraudulent transfer of debtor's property, whether US creditors are protected against prejudice in the processing of their claims in the other country, and the manner in which assets are distributed.

The court may conduct an evidentiary hearing, including considering expert testimony, to determine whether those and other factors are satisfied.

== Original Chapter 15 (1978–1984) ==
The original 1978 Bankruptcy Code had a different Chapter 15 dealing with the United States Trustee Program, which it established as a trial in some judicial districts to assume roles which formerly belonged to the bankruptcy judge and others, including the selection and oversight of private trustees in individual cases. At that time, the other chapters of the Bankruptcy Code described how bankruptcy worked in districts without United States Trustees; original Chapter 15 modified the text of the other chapters for districts with United States Trustees. Section numbers in original Chapter 15 incorporated the section numbers in the main Code that they modified; for example, section 151325 (a section of original Chapter 15) modified section 1325, which sets the requirements of Chapter 13 plans.

Since the trial program was considered a success, Congress in 1984 ordered the creation of United States Trustees in all states except Alabama and North Carolina. Since original Chapter 15 is now applied in most states, its text was then merged into the main Bankruptcy Code; separate provisions were enacted for Alabama and North Carolina, where other officers of the court assume the role of the United States Trustee.
