= Stichting Shell Pensioenfonds v Krys =

UK legal case

- Court: Judicial Committee of the Privy Council
- Full case name: Stichting Shell Pensioenfonds v Krys and Another
- Decided: 26 November 2014
- Citation: [2014] UKPC 41

Court membership
- Judges sitting: Lady Hale; Lord Clarke; Lord Wilson; Lord Sumption; Lord Toulson

Case opinions
- Decision by: Lord Sumption and Lord Toulson

Stichting Shell Pensioenfonds v Krys [2014] UKPC 41 (24 November 2014) was a decision of the Privy Council on appeal from the British Virgin Islands relating to an anti-suit injunction in connection with an insolvent liquidation being conducted by the British Virgin Islands courts.

== Background ==
=== Fairfield Sentry Ltd ===
Bernard L. Madoff Investment Securities LLC (referred to in the judgment as "BLMIS") was a New York-based fund manager controlled by Bernard Madoff. Over a period of at least seventeen years Madoff operated what was probably the largest Ponzi scheme in history, accepting sums variously estimated between $17 billion and $50 billion for investment. From at least the early 1990s there appear to have been no trades and no investments. Reports and returns to investors were fictitious and the corresponding documentation fabricated. On 11 December 2008, Mr Madoff was arrested, and in March 2009 pleaded guilty to a number of counts of fraud.

Funds for investment were commonly entrusted to BLMIS by "feeder funds". The largest of these was Fairfield Sentry Ltd, an offshore fund incorporated in the British Virgin Islands. Its liquidators stated that as at 31 October 2008 about 95% of its assets, amounting to some US$7.2 billion, were invested with BLMIS. Investors participated indirectly in these investments by acquiring shares in Fairfield Sentry at a price dependent on the net asset value per share published from time to time by the directors. Investors were entitled to withdraw funds by redeeming their shares under the provisions of the Articles of Association.

Stichting Shell Pensioenfonds (called simply "Shell" in the judgment), is a Dutch pension fund incorporated in the Netherlands. Between 2003 and 2006, it subscribed US$45m for 46,708.1304 Fairfield Sentry shares, under five successive subscription agreements. These agreements were governed by New York law and contained submissions to the exclusive jurisdiction of the New York courts.

=== The Dutch proceedings ===
On 12 December 2008 (the day after Mr Madoff's arrest) Shell applied to redeem its shares in Fairfield Sentry. However, no redemption payment was received and, six days later (on 18 December 2008), the directors of Fairfield Sentry effectively suspended share redemptions.

Four days later, on 22 December 2008, Shell applied in the Amsterdam District Court for permission to obtain a pre-judgment garnishment or conservatory attachment over all assets of Fairfield Sentry held by Citco Bank up to a value of US$80m. An order in those terms was made on the following day. In accordance with that order, three separate attachments were made totalling about US$71m. The initial application for authority to attach was made ex parte. However, Fairfield Sentry was entitled to apply inter partes to lift the attachment and did so; that application was rejected by the District Court of Amsterdam on 16 February 2011.

Shell had a four-month deadline for the commencement of substantive proceedings; this was extended several times, and the proceedings were ultimately commenced on 19 March 2010. The principal claim made was for US$45m damages for the alleged breaches of the representation and warranties contained in a side-letter.

=== The BVI winding-up proceedings ===
On 21 July 2009, Fairfield Sentry was ordered by the High Court of the British Virgin Islands to be wound up and Mr Kenneth Krys and Ms Joanna Lau were appointed as its joint liquidators. Shell submitted a proof of debt in the liquidation for US$63,045,616.18. This amount was said to represent the redemption price of Shell's shares, calculated by reference to the NAV per share published by the directors of Sentry at 31 October 2008. It was claimed as a debt due under Shell's redemption notice of 12 December 2008. The joint liquidators rejected Shell's proof on 21 August 2014, as a result of Bannister J's direction of 14 August, subject to Shell's right if it objected to the assets being distributed in accordance with that direction to put forward its objection in writing by 17 October 2014.

Accordingly, the effect of the attachments is that if Shell was to succeed in its substantive claim in the Dutch courts, it is likely to be able to satisfy its judgment-debt in full out of Fairfield Sentry's assets frozen by the garnishee order, whereas others who have claims in the liquidation ranking with or ahead of theirs may recover only a dividend.

On 8 March 2011, shortly after the District Court of Amsterdam rejected Fairfield Sentry's challenge to the attachments, the joint liquidators applied in the High Court of the British Virgin Islands for an anti-suit injunction restraining Shell from prosecuting its proceedings in the Netherlands and requiring it to take all necessary steps to procure the release of the attachments. The application was heard inter partes by Bannister J in July 2011, who rejected it in a judgment delivered on 9 August. His main reason, in summary, was that as a matter of principle the BVI court would not prevent a foreign creditor from resorting to his own courts, even if he was amenable to the BVI court's jurisdiction. The Eastern Caribbean Court of Appeal allowed the appeal and made an order in substantially the terms which the joint liquidators had asked for in their notice of appeal. The order restrained Shell from taking any further steps in the existing Dutch proceedings against Fairfield Sentry or commencing new ones, but did not refer in terms to the attachments. The Court of Appeal's reasons, in summary, were (i) that Shell was subject to the personal jurisdiction of the BVI court by virtue of having lodged a proof in the liquidation, (ii) the assertion by the Dutch courts of a jurisdiction to attach assets on the sole ground that it consisted in a debt owed to the insolvent company by a Dutch entity was exorbitant; and (iii) Shell should not be allowed to avail itself of that jurisdiction so as to gain a priority to which it was not entitled under the statutory rules of distribution applying in the British Virgin Islands.

== Judgment ==
The only judgment was given as a joint judgment by Lord Sumption and Lord Toulson.

=== Integrity of insolvency proceedings ===
Their Lordships noted that under British Virgin Islands insolvency law (as in England), the making of an order to wind up a company divests it of the beneficial ownership of its assets, and subjects them to a statutory trust for their distribution in accordance with the rules of distribution provided for by statute. This applies not just to assets located within the jurisdiction of the winding up court, but all assets world-wide. This, they held, necessarily excludes a purely territorial approach in which each country is regarded as determining according to its own law the distribution of the assets of an insolvent company located within its territorial jurisdiction.

The Privy Council then recapped the fundamental principle applicable to all anti-suit injunctions, as stated at the outset of the history of this branch of law by Sir John Leach V-C in Bushby v Munday. The court will not interfere directly with any foreign court, but may act personally upon a defendant by restraining him from commencing or continuing proceedings in a foreign court where the ends of justice so require. Their Lordships noted that the 'ends of justice' is a deliberately imprecise expression, but referred to the three main categories identified by Lord Cranworth LC in Carron Iron Company Proprietors v Maclaren These were:

- simultaneous proceedings in England and abroad on the same subject-matter;
- foreign proceedings which were being brought in an inappropriate forum to resolve questions which could more naturally and conveniently be resolved in England; and
- where foreign proceedings are "contrary to equity and good conscience".

Their Lordships referred to the case of Re Oriental Inland Steam Company where a creditor proved in the liquidation of the Oriental Inland Steam Company in England but attempted to obtain priority to other creditors by attaching property of the company in India. He was restrained by injunction from proceeding in India, but obtained the value of his debt from the liquidator in return for lifting the attachment, without prejudice to the question whether he should be allowed to retain it. The Court of Appeal affirmed an order requiring him to repay it. Sir William James LJ said:

All the assets there would be liable to be torn to pieces by creditors there, notwithstanding the winding-up, and there would be an utter incapacity of the Courts there to proceed to effect an equitable distribution of them. The English Act of Parliament has enacted that in the case of a winding-up the assets of the company so wound up are to be collected and applied in discharge of its liabilities. That makes the property of the company clearly trust property. It is property affected by the Act of Parliament with an obligation to be dealt with by the proper officer in a particular way… One creditor has, by means of an execution abroad, been able to obtain possession of part of those assets. The Vice-Chancellor was of opinion that this was the same as that of one cestui que trust getting possession of the trust property after the property had been affected with notice of the trust. If so, that cestui que trust must bring it in for distribution among the other cestuis que trust. So I, too, am of opinion, that these creditors cannot get any priority over their fellow-creditors by reason of their having got possession of the assets in this way. The assets must be distributed in England upon the footing of equality.

The Privy Council noted that in Re North Carolina Estate Co Ltd Chitty J applied the same principle, and did Millett J in Mitchell v Carter The Privy Council also noted that the same principle had been upheld by the United States Supreme Court in Cole v Cunningham.

=== Anti-suit injunctions ===
The Privy Council reviewed the leading modern case on the jurisdiction to restrain foreign proceedings, Société Nationale Industrielle Aérospatiale v Lee Kui Jak., and noted that in that case Lord Goff, also sitting in the Privy Council, noted that insolvency cases involved different considerations and proceeded on a different principle. They were based not specifically upon protecting litigants against vexation or oppression, but on the protection of the court's jurisdiction administer fairly and equally between claimants to an insolvent estate:

One such category of case arises where an estate is being administered in this country, or a petition in bankruptcy has been presented in this country, or winding up proceedings have been commenced here, and an injunction is granted to restrain a person from seeking, by foreign proceedings, to obtain the sole benefit of certain foreign assets. In such cases, it may be said that the purpose of the injunction is to protect the jurisdiction of the English court.

Their Lordships felt that it was clear from Lord Goff's formulation that he was making the same distinction as Lord Cranworth had made in Carron Iron between cases such as the insolvency cases, in which there is an equitable jurisdiction to enforce the statutory scheme of distribution according to its terms, and cases in which the court intervenes on the ground of vexation or oppression. The Privy Council also reflected upon its recent decision in Singularis Holdings Ltd v PriceWaterhouseCoopers where it was held that there is a broader public interest in the ability of a court exercising insolvency jurisdiction in the place of the company's incorporation to conduct an orderly winding up of its affairs on a world-wide basis, notwithstanding the territorial limits of its jurisdiction. In such cases "the court is not standing on its dignity", but it intervenes because the proper distribution of the company's assets depends upon its ability to get in those assets so that comparable claims to them may be dealt with fairly in accordance with a common set of rules applying equally to all of them, and there is no jurisdiction other than that of the insolvent's domicile in which that result can be achieved.

Accordingly, the Board felt in principle that an injunction was justifiable. But two further subsidiary issues needed to be considered. Firstly, whether Shell, as a foreign entity, is subject to the court's jurisdiction. And secondly, whether, even on the footing that an anti-suit injunction is available in principle, it is right to make one as a matter of discretion.

==== Jurisdiction ====
The Privy Council followed the 2012 decision of the United Kingdom Supreme Court in Rubin v Eurofinance SA. Shell argued that it had not submitted to the jurisdiction of the British Virgin Islands courts for all purposes; it accepted that it had submitted only for the purpose of claims under the Insolvency Act and Rules, and not for the purpose of claims governed by the general law. The Privy Council rejected that submission, stating "[i]n the Board's opinion, there is no such principle."

==== Discretion ====
As with any injunction, their Lordships noted this is subject to the court's discretion to refuse relief if in the particular circumstances it would not serve the ends of justice. Their Lordships noted that in the present case, the Judge at first instance having concluded that the issue of an injunction would be contrary to principle, the Court of Appeal were entitled to overrule him and to exercise their own discretion. They exercised it in the liquidators' favour, and the Board should not interfere unless it is shown that they were guilty of some error of principle or misconception of fact, or that they were plainly wrong. Accordingly, the Privy Council declined to disturb the exercise by the Court of Appeal of their discretion in favour of the injunction.

== Commentary ==
Commentary on the decision was generally positive, one commentator noting that "The judgment can be seen as a further endorsement of the restrained brand of the modified universalism developed in the Privy Council's recent decision in Singularis Holdings Ltd v PricewaterhouseCoopers", and "[i]t also clearly signals the BVI Court's willingness to intervene to protect the statutory scheme of distribution by means of anti-suit injunctions whilst providing useful guidance as to how the courts will exercise their equitable jurisdiction." Another added "The judgment of the Privy Council provides clear guidance to litigants who have claims against insolvent companies in the BVI and who are considering whether to pursue other remedies in a foreign jurisdiction in addition to filing a claim in the liquidation."

== See also ==
- British Virgin Islands bankruptcy law
- British Virgin Islands company law
