= Personal bankruptcy =

Form of debt relief for individuals

Personal bankruptcy law allows, in certain jurisdictions, an individual to be declared bankrupt. Virtually every country with a modern legal system features some form of debt relief for individuals. Personal bankruptcy is distinguished from corporate bankruptcy.

== By country ==
The DICE report 2006 of Munich's ifo Economic Research compared international personal bankruptcy in selected OECD-countries.

=== United States ===
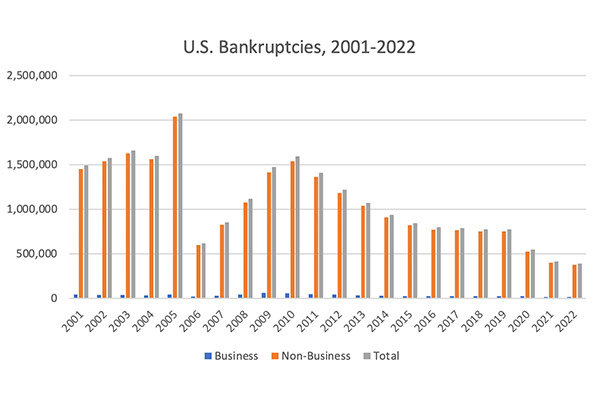
Number of personal and business US bankruptcy filings by year

In the United States, the same chapters of the Bankruptcy Code are applied in both personal and corporate bankruptcies. Most individuals who enter bankruptcy do so under Chapter 13 (a "reorganization" plan) or Chapter 7 (a "liquidation" of debtor's assets). More rarely, personal bankruptcy proceedings are carried out under Chapter 11. The ultimate goal of personal bankruptcy, from the viewpoint of the debtor, is receiving a discharge.

In 2008, more than 96% of all bankruptcy filings were non-commercial and about two-thirds of these were chapter 7 cases. Although the individual causes of bankruptcy are complex and multifaceted, most personal bankruptcies involve significant medical bills. Individual bankruptcies are usually filed under chapter 7 or chapter 13. According to the American Bankruptcy Institute, in 2017 38.8% of Chapter 13 bankruptcy cases ended in dismissal. In the first quarter of 2020, there were 175,146 individual bankruptcies in the United States. About 66.5% of these were directly related to medical problems.

During the 12 months ending June 30, 2026, 581,570 non-business bankruptcy cases were filed, 12 percent more than in the preceding 12-month period. Total bankruptcy filings, including business cases, were 608,511, which remained well below the September 2010 peak of nearly 1.6 million.

=== Canada ===
The concept behind bankruptcy in Canada is that an individual assigns (surrender) everything they own to a trustee in bankruptcy in exchange for the elimination of their unsecured debts.

The rules for filing personal bankruptcy in each province and territory differ slightly. In some areas of Canada individuals may be permitted to keep (exempt) certain property. Common items for exemption include clothing, furniture, appliances, motor vehicles, medical and dental aids, a home, family heirlooms, and some insurance. In basic terms, any property the debtor might require to survive can be exempt. Personal Bankruptcy will eliminate most, if not all, of an individual’s debt, but it also impacts their future ability to obtain credit.

The cost of personal bankruptcy in Canada depends on the individual’s monthly family income, the size of the family, and their assets (such as RRSPs). An alternative to personal bankruptcy (in Canada) is a Consumer Proposal. Another option in Canada is a debt consolidation. No matter what option they choose, they can often turn to a trustee in bankruptcy for a free consultation.

=== Israel ===
Personal bankruptcy in Israel is governed by the Insolvency and Rehabilitation Law, 2018. Insolvency proceedings below NIS150,000 will be administered entirely by the Enforcement and Collection Authority. Insolvency proceedings above NIS150,000 will be conducted before the official receiver (the Insolvency Commissioner) and, if relevant, before the court with respect to further, more specific matters. Simultaneously, with the issue of the order for the commencement of insolvency proceedings, the Insolvency Commissioner shall appoint a trustee for the debtor and an audit will be carried out, in which the debtor’s economic capability and his conduct will be examined (lasting approximately 12 months). At the end of this audit a payment plan is established, at the end of which the debtor will receive a discharge. The default scenario is a payment period of three years, however, the court reserves the right to increase or decrease the period depending upon the circumstances of the case. If the debtor has no proven financial ability to pay the creditors, he may be granted an immediate discharge. Since 1996, Israeli personal bankruptcy law has shifted to a relatively debtor-friendly regime, not unlike the American model.

== See also ==
- List of bankrupts
