= Chris Plewman =

South African judge (1927–2017)

Judge of the Supreme Court of Appeal
- In office 1 September 1996 – 2001
- Appointed by: Nelson Mandela

Personal details
- Born: Christel Plewman; 19 March 1927 Boksburg, Transvaal; Union of South Africa
- Died: 27 June 2017 (aged 90)
- Spouse: Gillian Plewman
- Education: Selborne College
- Alma mater: University of the Witwatersrand

Christel Plewman (19 March 1927 – 27 June 2017) was a South African judge who served in the Supreme Court of Appeal from 1996 to 2001. Formerly an advocate and Senior Counsel in Johannesburg, he also served in the Witwatersrand Local Division of the Supreme Court of South Africa.

== Early life and legal career ==
Plewman was born in Boksburg. He matriculated at Selborne College in East London in 1944 and went on to the University of the Witwatersrand, where he completed a BCom in 1948 and an LLB in 1951.

== Legal career ==
Plewman joined the Johannesburg Bar in 1952. During the first two decades of his career, he served as junior counsel in several prominent criminal trials, with clients including Barend van Niekerk (under Sydney Kentridge) and the Treason Trial defendants (under Isie Maisels). However, after taking silk in June 1972, he developed a commercial law practice, focusing primarily on intellectual property and patent law. He also represented the Bar on the government committees which drafted the Patents Act and Copyright Act of 1978.

== Judicial career ==
In 1991, Plewman accepted appointment as a judge of the Witwatersrand Local Division of the Supreme Court of South Africa. On 1 September 1996, he was elevated to the Supreme Court's Appellate Division (later the Supreme Court of Appeal), where he was viewed as an authority on intellectual property jurisprudence. He also succeeded Frikkie Eloff as chairman of the board of Legal Aid until September 1998, when he was replaced by Mahomed Navsa.

== Retirement and personal life ==
Plewman retired from the judiciary in 2001. However, he continued to work as an arbitrator and to serve as an acting judge in the Botswana and Lesotho Courts of Appeal. He died on 27 June 2017 at the age of 90.

He was married to Gillian Plewman and had three children, named Nicholas, Thomas, and Lisa.
