= Rebuttal =

Legal term

In law, rebuttal is a form of evidence that is presented to contradict or nullify other evidence that has been presented by an adverse party. By analogy the same term is used in politics and public affairs to refer to the informal process by which statements, designed to refute or negate specific arguments (see Counterclaim) put forward by opponents, are deployed in the media.

In law, special rules apply to rebuttal; rebuttal evidence or rebuttal witnesses must be confined solely to the subject matter of the evidence rebutted. New evidence on other subjects may not be brought in rebuttal. However, rebuttal is one of the few vehicles whereby a party may introduce surprise evidence or witnesses. The basic process is as follows: both sides of a controversy are obliged to declare in advance of trial what witnesses they plan to call, and what each witness is expected to testify to. When either a plaintiff (or prosecutor) or defendant brings direct evidence or testimony which was not anticipated, the other side may be granted a specific opportunity to rebut it. In rebuttal, the rebutting party may generally bring witnesses and evidence which were never before declared, so long as they serve to rebut the prior evidence.

== Surrebuttal ==
In the adversarial process, for instance a court proceeding, a surrebuttal is a response to the opposing party's rebuttal; in essence it is a rebuttal to a rebuttal.
