= UNCITRAL Model Law on Cross-Border Insolvency =

The UNCITRAL Model Law on Cross-Border Insolvency was a model law issued by the secretariat of UNCITRAL on 30 May 1997 to assist states in relation to the regulation of corporate insolvency and financial distress involving companies which have assets or creditors in more than one state.

At present 23 jurisdictions have substantially adopted the Model Law.

== Purpose ==
The preamble to the Model Law provides:

The purpose of this Law is to provide effective mechanisms for dealing with cases of cross-border insolvency so as to promote the objectives of:

(a) Cooperation between the courts and other competent authorities of this State and foreign States involved in cases of cross-border insolvency;
(b) Greater legal certainty for trade and investment;
(c) Fair and efficient administration of cross-border insolvencies that protects the interests of all creditors and other interested persons, including the debtor;
(d) Protection and maximization of the value of the debtor's assets; and

(e) Facilitation of the rescue of financially troubled businesses, thereby protecting investment and preserving employment.

The Model Law is designed to provide a model framework to encourage cooperation and coordination between jurisdictions. Despite earlier proposals to do so, it does not attempt to unify substantive insolvency laws, and the Model Law respects the differences among the substantive and procedural laws of states.

The Model Law defines a cross-border insolvency is one where the insolvent debtor has assets in more than one state, or where some of the creditors of the debtor are not from the state where the insolvency proceeding is taking place.

UNCITRAL published the Model Law in response to concerns that the number of cross-border insolvency cases had increased significantly during the 1990s, but national and international legal regimes equipped to address the issues raised by those cases has not evolved at a similar pace. The absence of effective cross-border insolvency regimes was thought to have resulted in inadequate and uncoordinated approaches to cross-border insolvency which were both unpredictable and time-consuming in their application, lacking both transparency and the tools necessary to address the disparities between different national laws. As a result, it had become difficult to protect the residual value of the assets of financially troubled businesses, and impeded corporate rescue culture for cross-border entities.

== Methodology ==
Rather than prescribing a single set of rules for all states to adopt, the Model Law focuses on trying to:

1. Identify the most relevant jurisdiction in relation to a cross-border insolvency (called the "foreign main proceeding");
2. Ensure that insolvency officials from that jurisdiction are recognised in other states; and
3. Ensure that other states provide the necessary cooperation to facilitate the insolvency process in the principal jurisdiction.

In order to identify the principal jurisdiction, the Model Law utilises the "centre of main interest" (or COMI) concept. The working assumption is that any international business will nonetheless have a centre of main interest, where the principal insolvency should take place. As far as possible the assets and claims should be channeled back to that main jurisdiction, and all other jurisdictions should seek to limit the exercise of their insolvency regimes to assisting with the liquidation of assets in their countries, the staying of claims, the redirecting of claims back to the principal jurisdiction. The basis of the Model Law is sometimes referred to as modified universalism.

The Model Law defines a foreign proceeding as "a collective judicial or administrative proceeding in a foreign State, including an interim proceeding, pursuant to a law relating to insolvency in which proceeding the assets and affairs of the debtor are subject to control or supervision by a foreign court, for the purpose of reorganization or liquidation". Accordingly, a number of regimes relating to the enforcement of security interests (such as receivership and administrative receivership) are not caught. Similarly, a number of debtor-in-possession rehabilitation and reorganisational processes which do not require the intervention of the courts are similarly not caught.

The Model Law recognises the risk that certain provisions of one state's insolvency laws may be repugnant to another state, and creates a public policy exception in relation to foreign laws, although the guidance notes express the hope that this would be utilised rarely in commercial insolvency matters.

The Model Law also seeks to limit insolvency regimes which favour domestic creditors over foreign ones.

== Countries ==
The following countries have substantially implemented the Model Law into their domestic legislation.

State	Date of implementation	State	Date of implementation
Australia	2008	Bahrain	2018
Benin	2015	Brazil	2020
British Virgin Islands	2003	Burkina Faso	2015
Cameroon	2015	Canada	2005
Central African Republic	2015	Chad	2015
Chile	2013	Colombia	2006
Comoros	2015	Congo	2015
Côte d'Ivoire	2015	Democratic Republic of the Congo	2015
Equatorial Guinea	2015	Gabon	2015
Gibraltar	2014	Greece	2010
Guinea	2015	Guinea-Bissau	2015
Israel	2018	Japan	2000
Kenya	2015	Malawi	2015
Mali	2015	Mauritius	2009
Mexico	2000	Montenegro	2002
New Zealand	2006	Niger	2015
Philippines	2010	Poland	2003
South Korea	2006	Romania	2002
Senegal	2015	Serbia	2004
Seychelles	2013	Singapore	2017
Slovenia	2007	South Africa	2000
Togo	2015	Uganda	2011
United Kingdom	2006	United States	2005
Vanuatu	2013		

== See also ==
- Cross-border insolvency
