= Cross-border insolvency =

Cross-border insolvency (sometimes called international insolvency) regulates the treatment of financially distressed debtors where such debtors have assets or creditors in more than one country. Typically, cross-border insolvency is more concerned with the insolvency of companies that operate in more than one country rather than bankruptcy of individuals. Like traditional conflict of laws rules, cross-border insolvency focuses upon three areas: choice of law rules, jurisdiction rules and enforcement of judgment rules. However, in relation to insolvency, the principal focus tends to be the recognition of foreign insolvency officials and their powers.

== Theories of cross-border insolvency ==
There are, broadly, three approaches to the administration of cross-border insolvency:

- The territorial approach, whereby each country exercises its own domestic insolvency laws in relation to all the debtor's property and all of the creditors located within its jurisdiction. This approach does not recognise any extraterritorial dimension to insolvency law.
- The universalist approach (or universal approach), whereby any cross-border insolvencies are administered pursuant to a single global insolvency regime, and all of the debtor's assets are distributed by a single insolvency office holder, regardless where the assets or claimants are located.
- Hybrid approach. A number of hybrid approaches exist in theory or practice, including:
  - Modified universalism, whereby individual countries seek to identify the most relevant jurisdiction in which to conduct the proceedings, and all other states cooperate with and facilitate such proceedings (subject to limits of public policy); or
  - Co-operative territorialism, which is broadly predicated on territorialist approach supplemented by multi-lateral conventions.

The universalist approach remains largely a holistic ideal and, for the most part, countries are divided into those with a purely territorial approach, and those that apply some form of hybrid approach.

== Development ==
Historically, most legal systems have developed on a territorial basis, and this is as true in relation to bankruptcy laws as other areas. However, from an early stage there have been piecemeal attempts to develop cross-border cooperation in insolvency matters.

- In 1889 seven treaties were signed in Montevideo with the aim to harmonising private international law in the signatory states (Argentina, Bolivia, Paraguay, Peru and Uruguay), one of which related to the regulation of bankruptcies between member states. The treaty was updated in 1930, and broadly provided for a system more closer to territorialism than universality, providing for multiple bankruptcy administrations in different states for multinational companies.
- In 1933 Denmark, Finland, Iceland, Norway and Sweden signed into law the Nordic Bankruptcy Convention which, although not a lengthy document, is still in force today and facilitates administration of cross border bankruptcies in the Scandinavia region.
- In the 1980s the International Bar Association published a model law, the Model International Insolvency Co-operation Act, but ultimately this model was not adopted by any country and the attempt was unsuccessful.

But from a comparatively early stage common law jurisdictions recognised the desirability of ensuring that insolvency officers from different jurisdictions received the necessary support to enable the efficient administration of estates. Under English law one of the earliest recorded cases was Solomons v Ross (1764) 1 H Bl 131n. In that case a firm in the Netherlands was declared bankrupt and assignees were appointed. An English creditor had brought garnishee proceedings in England to attach certain sums owing to the Dutch firm but Bathurst J held that the bankruptcy had vested all the firm's assets (including debts owed by English debtors) in the Dutch assignees, and the English creditor had to surrender the fruits of the garnishee proceedings and prove in the Dutch bankruptcy. In Re African Farms 1906 TS 373 an English company with assets in the Transvaal Colony was in winding-up in England, and the Chief Justice of the Transvaal confirmed that the English liquidator would be recognised and that "recognition which carries with it the active assistance of the court", and that active assistance could include: "A declaration, in effect, that the liquidator is entitled to deal with the Transvaal assets in the same way as if they were within the jurisdiction of the English courts, subject only to such conditions as the court may impose for the protection of local creditors, or in recognition of the requirements of our local laws." In Galbraith v Grimshaw [1910] AC 508 Lord Dunedin stated that there should be only one universal process of the distribution of a bankrupt's property and that, where such a process was pending elsewhere, the English courts should not let actions in its jurisdiction interfere with that process.

However, the first significant developments in relation to cross-border insolvency regimes which were widely adopted were (1) the UNCITRAL Model Law, and (2) the EC Regulation on Insolvency Proceedings 2000.

== Modern regimes ==
Two current regimes for international insolvencies have been implemented on something wider than a regional basis: the UNCITRAL Model Law on Cross-Border Insolvency, and the EC Regulation on Insolvency Proceedings 2000. Both regimes locate the centre of main interest (or "COMI") of the debtor.

=== The UNCITRAL Model Law ===
The United Nations Commission on International Trade Law adopted a model law relating to cross-border insolvency on 30 June 1997. At present 46 jurisdictions have substantially implemented the Model Law into their domestic legislation, including a number of states with both significant economies and large volumes of cross border trade—such as the United States, Japan, the United Kingdom, Australia and Canada, as well as leading emerging economies such as Mexico and South Africa.

The basic concept of the Model Law is to establish what the "main proceedings" are in relation to any international insolvency. All other proceedings are referred to as the "non-main proceedings". The main proceedings are commenced where the debtor has its centre of main interest, or "COMI". Non-main proceedings may be commenced in any place where the debtor has a commercial establishment. The Model Law does not require reciprocity between states, but focuses upon (i) ensuring that states give assistance to insolvency officials from other countries in relation to main proceedings and non-main proceedings, and (ii) eliminating preferences for local creditors over international ones.

The following countries have substantially implemented the Model Law into their domestic legislation.

State	Date of Ratification	State	Date of Ratification
Australia	2008	Benin	2015
British Virgin Islands	2003	Burkina Faso	2015
Cameroon	2015	Canada	2005
Central African Republic	2015	Chad	2015
Chile	2013	Colombia	2006
Comoros	2015	Congo	2015
Côte d'Ivoire	2015	Democratic Republic of the Congo	2015
Equatorial Guinea	2015	Gabon	2015
Gibraltar	2014	Greece	2010
Guinea	2015	Guinea-Bissau	2015
Israel	2018	Japan	2000
Kenya	2015	Malawi	2015
Mali	2015	Mauritius	2009
Mexico	2000	Montenegro	2002
New Zealand	2006	Niger	2015
Philippines	2010	Poland	2003
South Korea	2006	Romania	2002
Senegal	2015	Serbia	2004
Seychelles	2013	Singapore	2017
Slovenia	2007	South Africa	2000
Togo	2015	Uganda	2011
United Kingdom	2006	United States	2005
Vanuatu	2013		

=== EC Regulation on Insolvency Proceedings 2000 ===
The EC Regulation on Insolvency Proceedings 2000 was passed on 29 May 2000 and came into effect on 31 May 2002. The EC Regulation, as its name applies, operates between member states of the European Union, and focuses upon creating a framework for the commencement of proceedings and for the automatic recognition and co-operation between the different member states. Unusually for a European regulation, the EC Insolvency Regulation does not seek to harmonise insolvency laws between the different member states.

Like the UNCITRAL Model Law, the EC Regulation also employs the concept of a centre of main interest (or "COMI"). The definition of the COMI is left to member states in their implementation of the Regulation, but paragraph (13) of the preamble states: 'The "centre of main interests" should correspond to the place where the debtor conducts the administration of his interests on a regular basis and is therefore ascertainable by third parties.' If the COMI of an entity is outside of the European Union then the insolvency proceedings are not subject to the Regulation. In relation to companies there is a presumption that the registered office is the COMI of the company, but this presumption can be (and often is) rebutted.

The EU Regulation does not define insolvency, but it does define insolvency proceedings as "...collective insolvency proceedings which entail the partial or total divestment of a debtor and the appointment of a liquidator." Article 3 divides proceedings into main proceedings and territorial proceedings. Main proceedings are accorded extraterritorial effect throughout the European Union. One of the concerns expressed in relation to the EC Regulation is that (other than a reference to the European Court of Justice) it provides no mechanism for determining which set of proceedings are the main proceedings if two or more jurisdictions claim their proceedings are the main proceedings.

== Areas of conflict ==
In any attempt to harmonise or facilitate cross-border administration of insolvent companies, national insolvency regimes can take widely divergent approaches on certain key points:

- Secured creditors. Whether or not bankruptcy proceedings operate as a stay upon the enforcement of secured creditor's rights as a fundamental determinant in relation to the manner of conduct of any proceedings
- Corporate rehabilitation regimes. Bankruptcy systems predicated on trying to rehabilitate companies (such as Chapter 11 in the United States, or administration orders in the United Kingdom) are fundamentally different in intent and effect to winding-up regimes that seeks to liquidate companies and distribute the proceeds to creditors.
- Set-off rights. Whilst certain countries allow creditors who have mutual claims with the debtor to set-off those claims in full, others require the creditors to pay any sums owed to the debtor in full before claiming in the proceedings. Within jurisdictions that do permit set-off, variations may arise as to whether set-off must be on an individual or group basis.
