= List of British Virgin Islanders =

This is a list of notable people from the British Virgin Islands.

== Politicians ==
- John Charles Brudenell-Bruce, MBE, OStJ
- Alvin Christopher
- Ivan Dawson
- Karl Dawson
- Isaac Glanville Fonseca
- Andrew Fahie
- Julian Fraser
- Corine George-Massicote
- Luce Hodge-Smith
- Omar Hodge
- Terrance B. Lettsome
- Conrad Maduro
- Ralph T. O'Neal, OBE
- Qwominer William Osborne
- Eileen Parsons
- Dancia Penn
- Howard Reynold Penn, MBE
- Cyril Romney
- Kye Rymer
- Ethlyn Smith
- Lorna Smith, OBE
- Orlando Smith, OBE
- H. Lavity Stoutt
- Sandra Ward
- Natalio Wheatley
- Vincent Wheatley
- Willard Wheatley
- Julian Willock

== Authors, writers and poets ==
- Richard Georges
- Jennie Wheatley

== Sportspeople ==
- J'maal Alexander
- Matthew Arneborg
- Dorian Auguiste
- Steve Augustine
- Keita Cline
- Dion Crabbe
- Peter Crook
- Philern Davis
- Erroll Fraser
- Dean Greenaway
- Tahesia Harrigan
- Eldred Henry
- Guy Hill
- D'Moi Hodge
- Lindel Hodge
- Vijay Jhappan
- Ashley Kelly (athlete)
- Chantel Malone
- Eric Matthias
- Kyron McMaster
- Jerry Molyneaux
- Elinah Phillip
- Greg Rhymer
- Lennox Samuel
- Karl Scatliffe
- John Shirley (sailor)
- Keith Thomas (sailor)
- Robin Tattersall
- Willis Todman
- Mario Todman
- Ralston Varlack

== Military ==
- Samuel Hodge, VC
- Tony Snell (RAF officer), DSO

== Other public figures ==
- Melanie Amaro
- Inez Archibald
- Joseph Archibald, QC
- Iyaz
- Dancia Penn, QC (also served as a politician representing the VIP in 8th district)
- Oscar Peterson
- Michael Riegels, QC

== Famous residents ==
- Sir Richard Branson
- Morgan Freeman
- Henry Jarecki
- Peter Jennings
- Larry Page
- Curt Richardson
- Daniel Wildenstein

== Historical figures ==
- "Black" Samuel Bellamy (pirate)
- Joost van Dyk (privateer)
- Arthur William Hodge (serial killer)
- John C. Lettsome (physician)
- Samuel Nottingham (philanthropist)
- William Thornton (architect)
