= List of flag bearers for the British Virgin Islands at the Olympics =

British Virgin Islands at the Olympics
- Flag of the British Virgin Islands
- IOC code: IVB
- NOC: British Virgin Islands Olympic Committee
- Website: www.bviolympics.org
- Medals: Gold 0 Silver 0 Bronze 0 Total 0

Summer appearances
- 1984; 1988; 1992; 1996; 2000; 2004; 2008; 2012; 2016; 2020; 2024

Winter appearances
- 1984; 1988–2010; 2014; 2018–2022; 2026

This is a list of flag bearers who have represented British Virgin Islands at the Olympics.

Flag bearers carry the national flag of their country at the opening ceremony of the Olympic Games.

#	Event year	Season	Flag bearer	Sport
1	1984	Winter	Erroll Fraser	Speed skating
2	1984	Summer	Lindel Hodge	Athletics
3	1988	Summer	Willis Todman	Athletics
4	1992	Summer	Karl Scatliffe	Athletics
5	1996	Summer	Keita Cline	Athletics
6	2000	Summer	Keita Cline	Athletics
7	2004	Summer	Dion Crabbe	Athletics
8	2008	Summer	Tahesia Harrigan	Athletics
9	2012	Summer	Tahesia Harrigan	Athletics
10	2014	Winter	Peter Crook	Freestyle skiing
11	2016	Summer	Ashley Kelly	Athletics
12	2020	Summer	Kyron McMaster	Athletics
12	2020	Summer	Elinah Phillip	Swimming
13	2024	Summer	Adaejah Hodge	Athletics
13	2024	Summer	Thad Lettsome	Sailing

== See also ==
- British Virgin Islands at the Olympics
