= British Virgin Islands at the 2024 Summer Olympics =

- Flag of the British Virgin Islands
- IOC code: IVB
- NOC: British Virgin Islands Olympic Committee
- Website: bviolympics.org

in Paris, France 26 July 2024 – 11 August 2024
- Competitors: 4 (3 men and 1 woman) in 2 sports
- Flag bearers (opening): Thad Lettsome & Adaejah Hodge
- Flag bearer (closing): Rikkoi Brathwaite
- Medals: Gold 0 Silver 0 Bronze 0 Total 0

Summer Olympics appearances (overview)
- 1984; 1988; 1992; 1996; 2000; 2004; 2008; 2012; 2016; 2020; 2024

The British Virgin Islands competed at the 2024 Summer Olympics in Paris, France, which were held from 26 July to 11 August 2024. The territory's participation in Paris marked its eleventh appearance at the Summer Olympics since its debut in 1984. The athlete delegation of the territory was composed of four people: Rikkoi Brathwaite, Adaejah Hodge and Kyron McMaster in athletics, and Thad Lettsome in sailing. Lettsome and Hodge were the flagbearers for the territory at the opening ceremony while Brathwaite was the flagbearer at the closing ceremony.

Lettsome competed in the men's laser, placing 38th and not advancing to the medal race. Then, Brathwaite and Hodge reached the semifinals of the men's 100 metres and women's 200 metres respectively but failed to advance further, while McMaster reached the finals of the men's 400 metres hurdles and placed fifth. Thus, the British Virgin Islands has yet to win an Olympic medal.

== Background ==
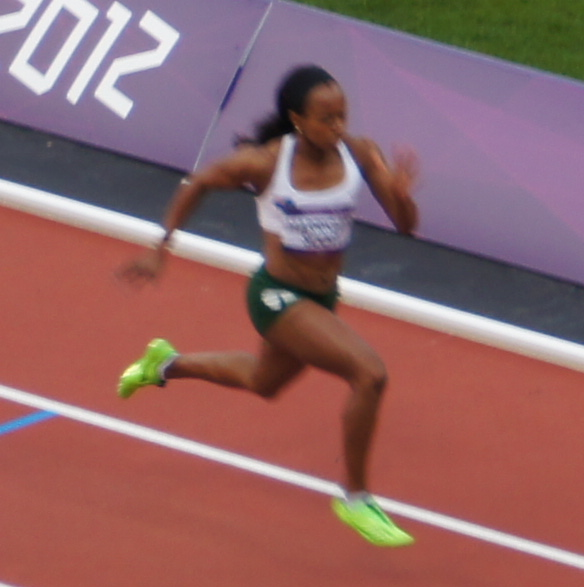
Chef de mission Tahesia Harrigan-Scott representing the territory at the 2012 Summer Olympics.

The Games were held from 26 July to 11 August 2024, in the city of Paris, France. This edition of the Games marked the territory's eleventh appearance at the Summer Olympics since its debut at the 1984 Summer Olympics in Los Angeles, United States. The territory had never won a medal at the Olympics, with its best performance coming from hurdler Kyron McMaster placing fourth in the men's 400 metres hurdles at the 2020 Summer Olympics.

In the lead-up to the Games, the British Virgin Islands Olympic Committee (BVIOC) received monetary support from businesses for the Tahesia Harrigan-Scott Elite Athlete Scholarship, which would assist athletes in preparation for the Games. The athletes that were awarded the scholarship were sprinter Rikkoi Brathwaite, shot putter Eldred Henry, sprinter Adaejah Hodge, sailor Thad Lettsome, long jumper Chantel Malone, and hurdler Kyron McMaster. The BVIOC collaborated with its member national sport federations and the Department of Youth Affairs and Sports to host a sports festival on 22 June 2024 at the H. Lavity Stoutt Community College. The event also commemorated the 40th anniversary of the territory's first Olympic Games participation.

=== Delegation ===
The official delegation composed of twelve people. Officials present were BIVOC president Ephraim Penn, BIVOC secretary general Lloyd Black, press attaché Sofia Fay, and chef de mission and Olympian Tahesia Harrigan-Scott. Coaches present were sailing coach Chris Watters, sailing assistant Tamsin Rand, and athletic coaches Willis Todman, Gerald Phiri, and Jean Carlos Arroyo. Todman and Phiri had also been Olympians for the British Virgin Islands and Zambia respectively. The athlete delegation was announced on 9 July 2024 through a press conference held by the BVIOC. The athletes that competed were sprinters Rikkoi Brathwaite and Adaejah Hodge who competed in the men's 100 metres and women's 200 metres respectively, hurdler Kyron McMaster, who competed in the men's 400 metres hurdles, and sailor Thad Lettsome who competed in the men's laser. Though not part of the official delegation, the Minister for Education, Youth Affairs and Sports Sharie De Castro attended the Games from 1 to 10 August 2024.

=== Opening and closing ceremonies ===
The British Virgin Islands delegation came in 198th out of the 205 National Olympic Committees in the 2024 Summer Olympics Parade of Nations within the opening ceremony. Lettsome and Hodge held the flag for the delegation. The delegation wore uniforms designed by British Virgin Islander designer Kristin Frazer of Treflé Design. At the closing ceremony, Brathwaite held the flag.

== Competitors ==
List of British Virgin Islander competitors at the 2024 Summer Olympics
| Sport | Men | Women | Total |
|---|---|---|---|
| Athletics | 2 | 1 | 3 |
| Sailing | 1 | 0 | 1 |
| Total | 3 | 1 | 4 |

== Athletics ==
=== Qualification and lead-up to the Games ===
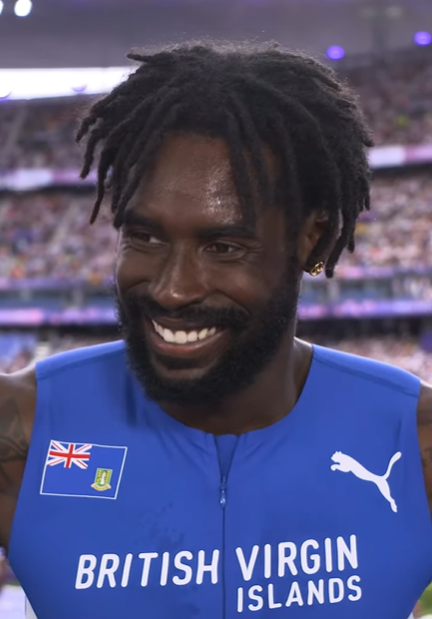
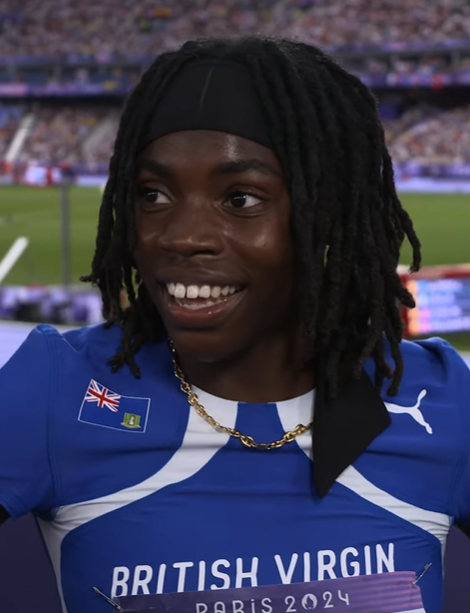
McMaster and Hodge during an interview after their races at the games

McMaster qualified for the Games on 20 July at the 2023 P-T-S Meeting in Banská Bystrica, Slovakia, running 47.26 seconds in the men's 400 metres hurdles—under the 48.70-second Olympic entry standard. Brathwaite then qualified through the world rankings within the men's 100 metres, where he placed 35th out of the 56 athletes which qualified for the Games. (Note: No available sources describe Hodge's qualification.)

Prior to the Games, the competitors trained at the A.O. Shirley Recreation Ground. Hodge and McMaster both sustained injuries prior to competing.

=== Event ===
The athletics events were held at the Stade de France. Brathwaite first competed in the men's 100 metres on 3 August, where he raced in the sixth heat and ran in a time of 10.13 seconds, placing third out of the nine people in his heat and qualifying for the semifinals. Two days later, he raced in the first semifinal and ran in a time of 10.15 seconds, placing eighth out of the nine people in his heat and did not qualify for the finals. Noah Lyles of the United States eventually won the gold in a time of 9.784 seconds.

Hodge competed in the women's 200 metres on 4 August, where she raced in the sixth heat. She finished with a time of 23.0 seconds, placing fifth out of the eight people in her round and was relegated to the repechage round for a chance to qualify further. The following day she competed in the first round against seven other people. She ran a time of 22.94 seconds for second place in her round and qualified for the semi-finals. She raced in the first semi-final against eight other competitors. She failed to qualify for the finals, running a time of 22.70 seconds for eighth place. The winner of the event was Gabrielle Thomas of the United States, who won in a time of 21.83 seconds.

McMaster competed in the men's 400 metres hurdles on 5 August, where he raced in the first heat against seven other competitors. He finished with a time of 49.24 seconds and a placement of third, qualifying for the semi-finals. Two days later, he competed in the semi-finals in the second round against eight other athletes. He placed first with a time of 48.15 seconds and qualified for the finals. At the finals two days later, he ran against eight people. He ran a season best-setting time of 47.79 seconds and placed fifth, the highest position for a British Virgin Islander athlete at the Games. The winner of the event was Rai Benjamin of the United States, who won in a time of 46.46 seconds.

Key
- Note–Ranks given for track events are within the athlete's heat only
- Q = Qualified for the next round
- q = Qualified for the next round as a fastest loser or, in field events, by position without achieving the qualifying target
- NR = National record
- N/A = Round not applicable for the event
- Bye = Athlete not required to compete in round

Track & road events

Athletics summary
| Athlete | Event | Preliminary | | Heat | | Repechage | | Semifinal | | Final | |
| Athlete | Event | Time | Rank | Time | Rank | Time | Rank | Time | Rank | Time | Rank |
|---|---|---|---|---|---|---|---|---|---|---|---|
| Rikkoi Brathwaite | Men's 100 m | Bye | | 10.13 | 3 Q | — | | 10.15 | 8 | Did not advance | |
| Kyron McMaster | Men's 400 m hurdles | — | | 49.24 | 3 Q | Bye | | 48.15 | 1 Q | 47.79 SB | 5 |
| Adaejah Hodge | Women's 200 m | — | | 23.00 | 5 R | 22.94 | 2 q | 22.70 | 8 | Did not advance | |

== Sailing ==
=== Qualification and lead-up to the Games ===
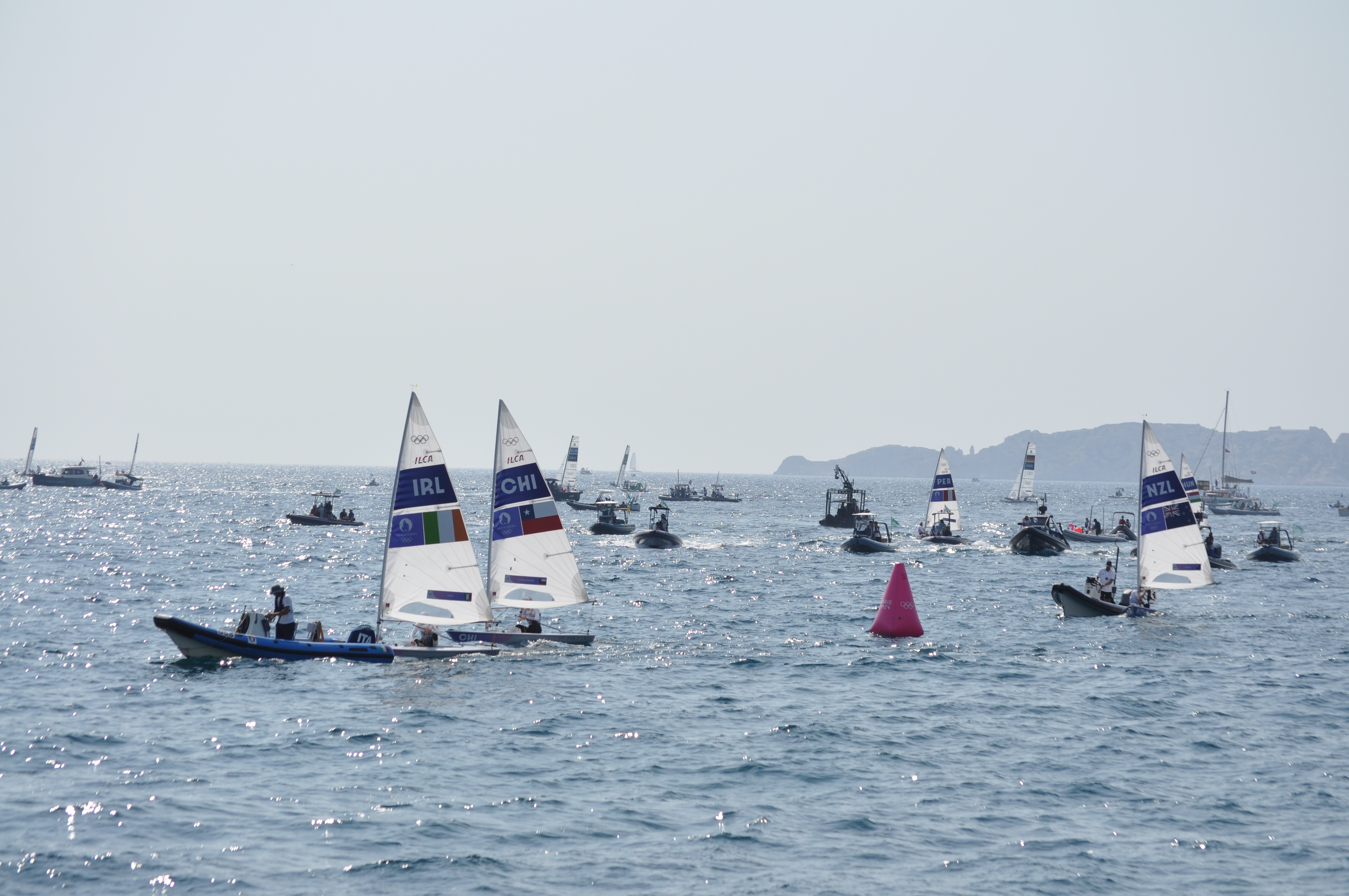
The Marseille Marina during one of the races of Lettsome's event

The territory received a universality slot from World Sailing to send one male Laser sailor for the Games, which allows a National Olympic Committee to send athletes despite not meeting the standard qualification criteria. Thad Lettsome was one of the three sailors eligible for two available slots, and was accepted after increasing his ranking by placing 31st out of 61 sailors at The Last Chance Regatta in Hyères, France, from 21 to 27 April 2024. During the lead-up to the Games, Lettsome graduated from Tulane University with a degree in real estate development. Lettsome's qualification marked the territory's recurrence to the sport since the 1996 Summer Olympics, when Robert Hirst competed in the same event.

=== Event ===
Lettsome competed from 1 to 5 August 2024, at the Marseille Marina in Marseille. He was eliminated before the medal rounds, scoring 215 points and placing 38th overall, though he placed second in his fourth race. The eventual winner of the event was Matthew Wearn of Australia. After the games, Lettsome announced his retirement from competitive sailing to pursue law school with a focus on real estate law at Queen Mary University of London.

Medal race events

Sailing summary
| Athlete | Event | Race | | | | | | | | | | | Net points | Final rank |
| Athlete | Event | 1 | 2 | 3 | 4 | 5 | 6 | 7 | 8 | 9 | 10 | M* | Net points | Final rank |
|---|---|---|---|---|---|---|---|---|---|---|---|---|---|---|
| Thad Lettsome | Men's ILCA 7 | ~~40~~ | 38 | 36 | 2 | 38 | 38 | 26 | 37 | C | C | EL | 215 | 38 |

M = Medal race; EL = Eliminated – did not advance into the medal race; C = race cancelled

== See also ==
- British Virgin Islands at the 2023 Pan American Games
