= British Virgin Islands at the 1996 Summer Olympics =

- Flag of the British Virgin Islands
- IOC code: IVB
- NOC: British Virgin Islands Olympic Committee
- Website: bviolympics.org

in Atlanta
- Competitors: 7 (7 men and 0 women) in 2 sports
- Flag bearer: Keita Cline
- Medals: Gold 0 Silver 0 Bronze 0 Total 0

Summer Olympics appearances (overview)
- 1984; 1988; 1992; 1996; 2000; 2004; 2008; 2012; 2016; 2020; 2024; 2028

The British Virgin Islands competed at the 1996 Summer Olympics in Atlanta, United States.

== Competitors ==
The following is the list of number of competitors in the Games.

Sport	Men	Women	Total
Athletics	6	0	6
Sailing	1	0	1
Total	7	0	7

== Athletics ==
Men

Athlete	Event	Heat		Semifinal		Final	
Athlete	Event	Result	Rank	Result	Rank	Result	Rank
Greg Rhymer	800 m	1:50.03	7	did not advance			
Ralston Varlack; Keita Cline; Willis Todman; Mario Todman	4 × 100 m relay	41.26	7	did not advance			
Mario Todman; Steve Augustine; Greg Rhymer; Ralston Varlack	4 × 400 m relay	3:17.30	6	did not advance			

Athlete	Event	Qualification		Final	
Athlete	Event	Distance	Position	Distance	Position
Keita Cline	Long Jump	7.26	40	did not advance	

Key

- Note–Ranks given for track events are within the athlete's heat only
- Q = Qualified for the next round
- q = Qualified for the next round as a fastest loser or, in field events, by position without achieving the qualifying target
- NR = National record
- N/A = Round not applicable for the event
- Bye = Athlete not required to compete in round

== Sailing ==
Laser Rank	Helmsman (Country)	Race I		Race II		Race III		Race IV		Race V		Race VI		Race VII		Race VIII		Race IX		Race X		Race XI		Total Points	Total -1
Laser Rank	Helmsman (Country)	Rank	Points	Rank	Points	Rank	Points	Rank	Points	Rank	Points	Rank	Points	Rank	Points	Rank	Points	Rank	Points	Rank	Points	Rank	Points	Total Points	Total -1
25	Robert Hirst (IVB)	~~39~~	~~39.0~~	19	19.0	29	29.0	17	17.0	31	31.0	25	25.0	~~32~~	~~32.0~~	9	9.0	20	20.0	30	30.0	12	12.0	263.0	192.0
