= British Virgin Islands at the 2004 Summer Olympics =

- Flag of the British Virgin Islands
- IOC code: IVB
- NOC: British Virgin Islands Olympic Committee
- Website: bviolympics.org

in Athens
- Competitors: 1 in 1 sport
- Flag bearer: Dion Crabbe
- Medals: Gold 0 Silver 0 Bronze 0 Total 0

Summer Olympics appearances (overview)
- 1984; 1988; 1992; 1996; 2000; 2004; 2008; 2012; 2016; 2020; 2024

The British Virgin Islands competed at the 2004 Summer Olympics in Athens, Greece, from 13 to 29 August 2004. This was the nation's sixth appearance at the Summer Olympics since its debut in the 1984 Summer Olympics. The British Virgin Islands delegation included only one athlete, meaning the country, along with Brunei and Liechtenstein, sent the lowest number of athletes to the 2004 Summer Games. The athlete selected was sprinter Dion Crabbe, an athlete who qualified for the Olympics by meeting the "A" standard time required for his event, the men's 200 meters. Crabbe was also selected as flag bearer for the opening ceremony. He did not progress beyond the heats, meaning the British Virgin Islands won no medals at this Summer Olympics.

== Background ==
The British Virgin Islands participated in six Summer Olympic games between its debut in the 1984 Summer Olympics in Los Angeles, United States and the 2004 Summer Olympics in Athens. The British Virgin Islands National Olympic Committee (NOC) selected one athlete to represent the country, Dion Crabbe, as he had qualified for the men's 200 meters after meeting the "A" standard required for the event. Sending only one athlete to the Athens Games meant that the country, along with Brunei and Liechtenstein, sent the lowest number of athletes to the 2004 Summer Games. Crabbe was also selected as flag bearer for the opening ceremony. Two officials represented the country, including chef de mission Dean Greenaway.

== Athletics ==
Making his Summer Olympic debut, Dion Crabbe qualified for the men's 200 meters, after his best time, 20.30 seconds in 2002, was 0.29 seconds faster than the "A" standard required. He was also notable for holding the British Virgin Islands flag at the opening ceremony. He competed on 24 August in the Men's 200 meters against seven other athletes in the fifth heat. He ran a time of 20.85 seconds, finishing sixth. He ranked ahead of Malaysia's Nazmizan Muhammad (21.24 seconds) and behind Czech Republic's Jirí Vojtík (20.79 seconds), in a heat led by Bahamas' Dominic Demeritte (20.62 seconds). Overall, Crabbe placed 33rd out of the 55 athletes that competed (Note: One athlete, Hamed Hamdan Albishi, did not start, and another, Chris Lambert did not finish.) and was 0.07 seconds behind the slowest athlete that progressed to the next round. Therefore, that was the end of his competition.

Key

- Note–Ranks given for track events are within the athlete's heat only
- Q = Qualified for the next round
- q = Qualified for the next round as a fastest loser or, in field events, by position without achieving the qualifying target
- NR = National record
- N/A = Round not applicable for the event
- Bye = Athlete not required to compete in round

Men

Athlete	Event	Heat		Quarterfinal		Semifinal		Final	
Athlete	Event	Result	Rank	Result	Rank	Result	Rank	Result	Rank
Dion Crabbe	200 m	20.85	6	did not advance					
