= British Virgin Islands at the 2016 Summer Olympics =

- Flag of the British Virgin Islands
- IOC code: IVB
- NOC: British Virgin Islands Olympic Committee
- Website: bviolympics.org

in Rio de Janeiro
- Competitors: 4 in 2 sports
- Flag bearer: Ashley Kelly
- Medals: Gold 0 Silver 0 Bronze 0 Total 0

Summer Olympics appearances (overview)
- 1984; 1988; 1992; 1996; 2000; 2004; 2008; 2012; 2016; 2020; 2024; 2028

British Virgin Islands competed at the 2016 Summer Olympics in Rio de Janeiro, Brazil, held from 5 to 21 August 2016. It was the territory's ninth appearance at the Summer Olympics, since its debut at the 1984 Summer Olympics in Los Angeles. The British Virgin Islands delegation consisted of four athletes competing in two sports. The territory did not win any medals at the Games.

== Background ==
The British Virgin Islands Olympic Committee was founded in 1980 and was recognized by the International Olympic Committee (IOC) on 28 May 1982 in the IOC session held at Rome. The territory made its first Summer Olympics appearance at the 1984 Summer Olympics in Los Angeles, though it made its Olympics debut in the 1984 Winter Olympics earlier that year. Since then, it has competed in every Summer Olympics, and the 2016 Summer Olympics was the nation's ninth appearance at the Summer Olympics.

The 2016 Summer Olympics was held in Rio de Janeiro, Brazil, between 5 and 21 August 2016. Sprinter Ashley Kelly served as the territory's flag bearer at the opening ceremony. British Virgin Islands had not previously won an Olympic medal, and did not win a medal at the 2016 Summer Olympics.

== Competitors ==
The British Virgin Islands delegation consisted of four athletes. This was the territory's largest delegation to the Summer Olympics since the 1996 Summer Olympics, when it had seven participants.

Sport	Men	Women	Total
Athletics	1	2	3
Swimming	0	1	1
Total	1	3	4

== Athletics ==
As per the governing body International Association of Athletics Federations (IAAF), a NOC was allowed to enter up to three qualified athletes in each individual event if the Olympic Qualifying Standards (OQS) for the respective events had been met during the qualifying period. The remaining places were allocated based on the IAAF Rankings. Three athletes from the British Virgin Islands achieved the qualifying standards for the Athletics events.

Tahesia Harrigan-Scott competed in the women's 100 m event. This was the third consecutive Summer Olympics appearance for her after her debut at the 2008 Summer Olympics, and thus she became the first-ever female athlete from the British Virgin Islands to compete in three successive Olympic Games. Shot putter Eldred Henry, and Harrigan-Scott's fellow sprinter Ashley Kelly made their Olympic debut at the Games.

The athletics events were held at the Estádio Olímpico João Havelange in Rio de Janeiro. In the women's 100 metres event, Harrigan-Scott received a direct entry into the quarterfinals, where she finished sixth in her race with a time of 11.54 seconds, and failed to advance to the semifinals. In the women's 200 m event, Kelly came fifth in the ninth preliminary heat with a time of 23.61 seconds, and did not advance further. In the qualifying rounds for the men's shot put, Henry had a best throw of 17.07 metres in his first attempt, and finished last of the 34 competitors.

Key

- Note–Ranks given for track events are within the athlete's heat only
- Q = Qualified for the next round
- q = Qualified for the next round as a fastest loser or, in field events, by position without achieving the qualifying target
- NR = National record
- N/A = Round not applicable for the event
- Bye = Athlete not required to compete in round

Track & road events

Athlete	Event	Heat		Quarterfinal		Semifinal		Final	
Athlete	Event	Result	Rank	Result	Rank	Result	Rank	Result	Rank
Tahesia Harrigan-Scott	Women's 100 m	Bye		11.54	6	Did not advance			
Ashley Kelly	Women's 200 m	23.61	5	—N/a		Did not advance			

Field events

Athlete	Event	Qualification		Final	
Athlete	Event	Distance	Position	Distance	Position
Eldred Henry	Men's shot put	17.07	34	Did not advance	

== Swimming ==
As per the Fédération internationale de natation (FINA) guidelines, a NOC was permitted to enter a maximum of two qualified athletes in each individual event, who have achieved the qualifying time. If the overall quota was not met, FINA allowed NOCs to enter one swimmer per gender under a universality place even if they have not achieved the standard entry times. British Virgin Islands received a universality invitation from FINA to send one female swimmer to the competition.

The swimming events were held at the Olympics Aquatics Stadium in Rio de Janeiro. Elinah Phillip made her Olympics debut in the women's 50 m freestyle event. Though she finished third in her qualifying heat, she was ranked 48th out of the 89 competitors, and did not advance further.

Athlete	Event	Heat		Semifinal		Final	
Athlete	Event	Time	Rank	Time	Rank	Time	Rank
Elinah Phillip	Women's 50 m freestyle	26.26	48	Did not advance			

== See also ==
- British Virgin Islands at the 2015 Pan American Games
