= British Virgin Islands at the 2020 Summer Olympics =

- Flag of the British Virgin Islands
- IOC code: IVB
- NOC: British Virgin Islands Olympic Committee
- Website: bviolympics.org

in Tokyo, Japan July 23, 2021 – August 8, 2021
- Competitors: 3 in 2 sports
- Flag bearers (opening): Elinah Phillip; Kyron McMaster
- Flag bearer (closing): N/A
- Medals: Gold 0 Silver 0 Bronze 0 Total 0

Summer Olympics appearances (overview)
- 1984; 1988; 1992; 1996; 2000; 2004; 2008; 2012; 2016; 2020; 2024

The British Virgin Islands competed at the 2020 Summer Olympics in Tokyo. Originally scheduled to take place from 24 July to 9 August 2020, the Games have been postponed to 23 July to 8 August 2021, because of the COVID-19 pandemic. It was the nation's tenth consecutive appearance at the Summer Olympics after its debut at the 1984 Summer Olympics.

British Virgin Islands was represented by three athletes who competed across two sports. Elinah Phillip and Kyron McMaster served as the country's flag-bearer during the opening ceremony and a volunteer carried the flag during the closing ceremony. The nation did not win any medals in the Games.

== Background ==
The British Virgin Islands Olympic Committee was formed as a separate National Olympic Committee (NOC) in 1980 and was approved by the International Olympic Committee (IOC) in 1982. The 1984 Summer Olympics marked the NOC's first participation as an independent nation in the Olympic Games. After the nation made its debut in the Summer Olympics at the 1984 Games, it competed in every Summer Olympics. This edition of the Games in 2020 marked the nation's tenth appearance at the Summer Games.

The 2020 Summer Olympics in Tokyo was originally scheduled to take place from 24 July to 9 August 2020. The Games were later postponed to 23 July to 8 August 2021 due to the COVID-19 pandemic. British Virgin Islands was represented by three athletes who competed across two sports. Elinah Phillip and Kyron McMaster served as the country's flag-bearer during the opening ceremony and a volunteer carried the flag during the closing ceremony. The nation did not win any medals in the Games.

== Competitors ==
British Virgin Islands was represented by three athletes who competed across two sports.

Sport	Men	Women	Total
Athletics	1	1	2
Swimming	0	1	1
Total	1	2	3

== Athletics ==
As per the governing body World Athletics (WA), a NOC was allowed to enter up to three qualified athletes in each individual event and one qualified relay team if the Olympic Qualifying Standards (OQS) for the respective events had been met during the qualifying period. The remaining places were allocated based on the World Athletics Rankings which were derived from the average of the best five results for an athlete over the designated qualifying period, weighted by the importance of the meet.

Two athletes from the British Virgin Islands achieved entry standards. In the Men's 400 m hurdles event, Kyron McMaster finished first in his heats and semi-finals to advance to the finals. In the finals, he set a new national record of 47.08 seconds and narrowly missed out on a medal after finishing fourth. In the women's long jump event, Chantel Malone achieved a jump of 6.82 m (22.4 ft) in the qualifications and finished 12th in the finals after a best attempt of 6.5 m (21 ft).

Key

- Note–Ranks given for track events are within the athlete's heat only
- Q = Qualified for the next round
- q = Qualified for the next round as a fastest loser or, in field events, by position without achieving the qualifying target
- NR = National record
- N/A = Round not applicable for the event
- Bye = Athlete not required to compete in round

Track & road events

Athlete	Event	Heat		Semifinal		Final	
Athlete	Event	Result	Rank	Result	Rank	Result	Rank
Kyron McMaster	Men's 400 m hurdles	48.79	1 Q	48.26	1 Q	47.08 NR	4

Field events

Athlete	Event	Qualification		Final	
Athlete	Event	Distance	Position	Distance	Position
Chantel Malone	Women's long jump	6.82	5 Q	6.50	12

== Swimming ==
As per the Fédération internationale de natation (FINA) guidelines, a NOC was permitted to enter a maximum of two qualified athletes in each individual event, who have achieved the Olympic Qualifying Time (OQT). If the quota was not filled, one athlete per event was allowed to enter, provided they achieved the Olympic Selection Time (OST). The qualifying time standards should have been achieved in competitions approved by World Aquatics in the period between 1 March 2019 to 27 June 2021. FINA also allowed NOCs to enter swimmers (one per gender) under a universality place even if they have not achieved the standard entry times (OQT/OST). British Virgin Islands received a universality invitation from FINA to send a top-ranked female swimmer in her respective individual events to the Olympics, based on the FINA Points System of June 28, 2021.

Elinah Phillip finished 34th in the heats in the women's 50 m freestyle event and did not advance to the finals.

Athlete	Event	Heat		Semifinal		Final	
Athlete	Event	Time	Rank	Time	Rank	Time	Rank
Elinah Phillip	Women's 50 m freestyle	25.74	34	Did not advance			

== See also ==
- British Virgin Islands at the 2019 Pan American Games
