= List of British Virgin Islands records in athletics =

The following are the national records in athletics in British Virgin Islands as set by BVI Nationals as maintained by the British Virgin Islands Athletics Association (BVIAA).

== Outdoor ==
Key to tables: Awaiting ratification Record not kept by BVIAA Not ratified or later rescinded by BVIAA

=== Men ===
Event	Record	Athlete	Date	Meet	Place	Ref.
100 m	10.00 (+1.1 m/s)	Rikkoi Braithwaite	19 July 2024	Holloway Pro Classic	Gainesville, United States	
200 m	20.30 (+1.5 m/s)	Dion Crabbe	12 May 2002		Starkville, United States	
400 m	46.04	Dean Greenaway	19 May 1979		Lincoln, United States	
800 m	1:46.98	Greg Rhymer	25 May 1994		Ypsilanti, United States	
1500 m	3:46.47	Greg Rhymer	21 May 1994		Athens, United States	
3000 m	9:32.1 h	Liston Farrington	26 April 1977		Bridgetown, Barbados	
5000 m	15:22.0 h	Anderson Legair	12 April 1997		Knoxville, United States	
10,000 m						
Half marathon	1:35:32	Marc Downing	26 November 2006		Portsmouth, Great Britain	
Half marathon	1:34:45	Zebalon McLean	19 November 2011		Road Town, British Virgin Islands	
Marathon	2:36:54	Rasalula Nagarit	11 November 2008	Baltimore Marathon	Baltimore, United States	
110 m hurdles	15.66 (+1.2 m/s)	Steve Augustine	18 April 1997	Mt. SAC Relays	Walnut, United States	
300 m hurdles	34.95	Kyron McMaster	26 April 2025	Xiamen Diamond League	Xiamen, China	
400 m hurdles	47.08	Kyron McMaster	3 August 2021	Olympic Games	Tokyo, Japan	
3000 m steeplechase	9:30.26	Anderson Legair	2 May 1998		Athens, United States	
High jump	2.13 m	Karl Scatliffe	1 July 1990		Road Town, British Virgin Islands	
High jump	2.13 m	Raymond Solomon	14 July 1991		Coamo, Puerto Rico	
Pole vault	4.20 m (Note: record set during decathlon competition)	Paul Hewlett	13 August 1987	Pan American Games	Indianapolis, United States	
Long jump	7.97 m (+0.6 m/s)	Keita Cline	11 May 1996	CARIFTA Games	Kingston, Jamaica	
Triple jump	15.73 m (NWI)	Keita Cline	20 May 1995		Minneapolis, United States	
Shot put	21.47 m	Eldred Henry	25 May 2019	NCAA Division II Championships	Kingsville, United States	
Weight throw	18.32 m	Eldred Henry	14 March 2015	CAC Throwers Pentathlon	Coolidge, United States	
Discus throw	61.90 m	Eldred Henry	26 April 2014	UCSD Triton Invitational	La Jolla, United States	
Hammer throw	53.88 m	Diamante Gumbs	6 May 2022	Southland Conference Championships	Humble, United States	
Hammer throw	54.86 m	Diamante Gumbs	4 May 2023	Southland Conference Championships	Commerce, United States	
Javelin throw	65.41 m	Omar Jones	22 May 2009		Hutchinson, United States	
Decathlon	6609 pts	Paul Hewlett	12–13 August 1987	Pan American Games	Indianapolis, United States	
Decathlon	100m (wind) / Long jump (wind) / Shot put / High jump / 400m / 110m H (wind) / Discus / Pole vault / Javelin / 1500m; 11.50 / 6.31 m / 11.69 m / 1.88 m / 50.76 / 16.03 / 35.44 m / 4.20 m / 47.14 m / 4:50.41					
20 km walk (road)						
50 km walk (road)						
4 × 100 m relay	39.78	British Virgin Islands; Shaquoy Stephens; Kyron McMaster; Ronique Todman; Rikkoi Braithwaithe	25 June 2017	Trinidad & Tobago Championships	Port of Spain, Trinidad and Tobago	
4 × 400 m relay	3:11.03	British Virgin Islands; Khari Herbert; Tarique Moses; Ronique Todman; Kyron McMaster	2 July 2017		St. George's, Grenada	

=== Women ===
Event	Record	Athlete	Date	Meet	Place	Ref.
100 m	10.63 (+1.9 m/s)	Adaejah Hodge	11 June 2026	NCAA Division I Championships	Eugene, United States	
200 m	21.68 (−0.4 m/s)	Adaejah Hodge	13 June 2026	NCAA Division I Championships	Eugene, United States	
400 m	51.24	Adaejah Hodge	28 March 2026	Hurricane Collegiate Invitational	Coral Gables, United States	
800 m	2:06.64	Samantha John	2 August 2009	Pan American Junior Championships	Port of Spain, Trinidad and Tobago	
1500 m	4:50.50	Lakeisha Warner	20 March 2012		Road Town, British Virgin Islands	
3000 m	10:53.1 h	Lakeisha Warner	16 March 2012		Road Town, British Virgin Islands	
5000 m						
10,000 m						
Half marathon	1:38:23	Katrina Crumpler	9 November 2014		San Juan, Puerto Rico	
Marathon	4:24:44	Anna Kinkead	11 January 2016	Walt Disney World Marathon	Orlando, United States	
100 m hurdles	13.13 (+1.0 m/s)	Deya Erickson	11 April 2026	South Florida Invitational	Tampa, United States	
300 m hurdles	46.43	Deya Erickson	1 April 2023	Felix Sánchez Classic	Santo Domingo, Dominican Republic	
400 m hurdles	57.21	Lakeisha Warner	24 May 2019		Jacksonville, United States	
3000 m steeplechase						
High jump	1.65 m	Takola Creque	21 May 1994		Road Town, British Virgin Islands	
High jump	1.65 m	Chantel Malone	29 June 2008	Leeward Islands Junior Championships	Road Town, British Virgin Islands	
High jump	1.65 m	Z’Niah Hutchinson	7 March 2016	National Junior Championships	Tortola, British Virgin Islands	
High jump	1.65 m	Xiomara Malone	1 April 2022		Orem, United States	
High jump	1.65 m	Xiomara Malone	9 April 2022		Logan, United States	
Pole vault						
Long jump	7.08 m (+1.4 m/s)	Chantel Malone	27 March 2021	Florida International Pro Addition Meeting	Miramar, United States	
Triple jump	13.36 m (+1.1 m/s)	Kala Penn	11 May 2019	SEC Championships	Fayetteville, United States	
Shot put	15.38 m	Trevia Gumbs	20 May 2018		St. George's, Grenada	
Discus throw	51.43 m	Tynelle Gumbs	22 April 2017	Polar Bear Invitational	El Paso, United States	
Hammer throw	60.97 m	Tynelle Gumbs	10 April 2018	Commonwealth Games	Gold Coast, Australia	
Javelin throw	46.35 m	Akira Phillip	18 May 2019	NJCAA Division I Championships	Hobbs, United States	
Heptathlon	4455 pts (NWI)	Arianna Hayde	2–3 May 2019		El Dorado, United States	
Heptathlon	100m H (wind) / High jump / Shot put / 200m (wind) / Long jump (wind) / Javelin / 800m; 15.69 (NWI) / 1.52 m / 9.45 m / 26.68 (NWI) / 5.53 (NWI) / 37.52 m / 2:49.92					
Heptathlon	4561 pts (NWI)	Arianna Hayde	16–17 May 2019	NJCAA Division I Championships	Hobbs, United States	
Heptathlon	100m H (wind) / High jump / Shot put / 200m (wind) / Long jump (wind) / Javelin / 800m					
20 km walk (road)						
4 × 100 m relay	43.45	British Virgin Islands; Ashley Kelly; Tahesia Harrigan-Scott; Chantel Malone; Karene King	2 July 2016	OECS Championships	Road Town, British Virgin Islands	
4 × 200 m relay	1:34.92	British Virgin Islands; Nelda Huggins; Tahesia Harrigan-Scott; Karene King; Ashley Kelly	22 April 2017	IAAF World Relays	Nassau, Bahamas	
Sprint medley relay (1,1,2,4)	1:40.04	British Virgin Islands; Tahesia Harrigan-Scott (100 m); Karene King (100 m); Beyoncé Defreitas (200 m); Ashley Kelly (400 m)	29 April 2017	Penn Relays	Philadelphia, Pennsylvania	
4 × 400 m relay	3:34.76	British Virgin Islands; Ashley Kelly; L. Warner; T. Moses; B. Defreitas	2 July 2017		St. George's, Grenada	

== Indoor ==
=== Men ===
Event	Record	Athlete	Date	Meet	Place	Ref.
50 m	5.74+	Rikkoi Brathwaite	4 February 2025	Czech Indoor Gala	Ostrava, Czech Republic	
60 m	6.52	Rikkoi Brathwaite	12 March 2022	NCAA Division I Championships	Birmingham, United States	
200 m	21.10	Dion Crabbe	23 February 2002	SEC Championships	Fayetteville, United States	
300 m	35.25	Rikkoi Braithwaite	7 December 2018	Hoosier Open	Bloomington, United States	
400 m	45.84 (Note: outdoor mark ratified as absolute record)	Kyron McMaster	14 February 2020	Tiger Paw Invitational	Clemson, United States	
600 m	1:17.65	Kyron McMaster	9 January 2021	Clemson Orange and Purple	Clemson, United States	
800 m	2:01.59	Khari Herbert	3 December 2016		Winston-Salem, United States	
800 m	1:50.55	Kyle Francis	1 March 2014		State College, United States	
1500 m						
3000 m						
60 m hurdles	8.67	Keron Stoute	15 February 2014		Landover, United States	
High jump	2.16 m (Note: outdoor mark ratified as absolute record)	Sam Noel	31 January 1998		Lexington, United States	
Pole vault	4.20 m (Note: outdoor mark ratified as absolute record)	Paul Hewlett	6 March 1988		Cosford, United Kingdom	
Long jump	7.99 m (Note: outdoor mark ratified as absolute record)	Keita Cline	10 February 1996		Ames, United States	
Triple jump	16.16 m (Note: outdoor mark ratified as absolute record)	Keita Cline	10 February 1996		Ames, United States	
Shot put	20.61 m	Eldread Henry	23 February 2019	GMAC Championships	Findlay, United States	
Weight throw	19.56 m	Eldread Henry	23 February 2019	G-MAC Championships	Findlay, United States	
Heptathlon	4956 pts	Paul Hewlett	5–6 March 1988		Cosford, United Kingdom	
Heptathlon	60m / Long jump / Shot put / High jump / 60m H / Pole vault / 1000m; 7.21 / 6.29 m / 11.61 m / 1.83 m / 8.83 / 4.20 m / 2:51.93					
5000 m walk						
4 × 400 m relay	3:30.01 (Note: not recognized by World Athletics)	Rakeel Jack; Joshua Hill; Rikkoi Brathwaite; Valique Graham	2016			

=== Women ===
Event	Record	Athlete	Date	Meet	Place	Ref.
50 m	6.24+	Adaejah Hodge	12 January 2024	VA Showcase	Virginia Beach, United States	
55 m	6.75	Tahesia Harrigan	24 February 2006	SEC Championships	Gainesville, United States	
55 m	6.75	Tahesia Harrigan	23 January 2015	Carnes Invitational	Gainesville, United States	
60 m	7.09	Tahesia Harrigan	7 March 2008	World Championships	Valencia, Spain	
200 m	22.22	Adaejah Hodge	14 March 2026	NCAA Division I Championships	Fayetteville, United States	
300 m	36.97	Adaejah Hodge	12 January 2024	Virginia Showcase	Virginia Beach, United States	
400 m	53.01	Ashley Kelly	12 February 2016	David Hemery Valentine Invitatonal	Boston, United States	
500 m	1:11.60	Tarika Moses	29 January 2016	John Thomas Terrier Invitational	Boston, United States	
600 m	1:31.10 A	Tarika Moses	13 February 2016	Don Kirby Open & Elite	Albuquerque, United States	
800 m	2:09.37	Lakeisha Warner	11 February 2017		Clemson, United States	
800 m	2:07.25 OT	Lakeisha Warner	24 February 2017	ACC Championships	South Bend, United States	
1500 m						
3000 m						
60 m hurdles	8.32	Deya Erickson	7 February 2025	Celebration Pointe Classic	Gainesville, United States	
High jump	1.72 m A (Note: indoor best; outdoor mark ratified as absolute record)	Xiomara Malone	25 February 2022	Mountain West Championships	Albuquerque, United States	
Pole vault						
Long jump	6.67 m	Chantel Malone	10 February 2017	ISTAF Indoor	Berlin, Germany	
Triple jump	13.45 m	Chantel Malone	12 March 2011	NCAA Division I Championships	College Station, United States	
Shot put	15.42 m	Trevia Gumbs	16 February 2018		Findlay, United States	
Weight throw	21.32 m	Tynelle Gumbs	10 February 2017		Boston, United States	
Pentathlon	3474 pts	Arianna Hayde	6 March 2020		Lynchburg, United States	
Pentathlon	60m H / High jump / Shot put / Long jump / 800m; 9.12 / 1.58 m / 9.97 m / 5.70 m / 2:38.46					
3000 m walk						
4 × 400 m relay	3:45.34	Tarika Moses; Lakeisha Warner; Karene King; Beyoncé Defeitas	29 January 2016		Boston, United States	
