= British Virgin Islands at the 1988 Summer Olympics =

- Flag of the British Virgin Islands
- IOC code: IVB
- NOC: British Virgin Islands Olympic Committee

in Seoul
- Competitors: 3 men in 2 sports
- Flag bearer: Willis Todman
- Medals: Gold 0 Silver 0 Bronze 0 Total 0

Summer Olympics appearances (overview)
- 1984; 1988; 1992; 1996; 2000; 2004; 2008; 2012; 2016; 2020; 2024

The British Virgin Islands was represented at the 1988 Summer Olympics in Seoul, South Korea by the British Virgin Islands Olympic Committee.

In total, three athletes – all men – represented the British Virgin Islands in two different sports including athletics and sailing.

== Competitors ==
In total, three athletes represented the British Virgin Islands at the 1988 Summer Olympics in Seoul, South Korea across two different sports.

Sport	Men	Women	Total
Athletics	2	0	2
Sailing	1	0	1
Total	3	0	3

== Athletics ==
In total, two British Virgin Islander athletes participated in the athletics events – Lindel Hodge in the men's 100 m and the men's 200 m and Willis Todman in the men's 400 m.

The athletics events were held at the Seoul Olympic Stadium in Seoul, South Korea from 20 to 27 September 1988.

The heats for the men's 100 m took place on 23 September 1988. Hodge finished sixth in his heat in a time of 10.79 seconds and he did not advance to the quarter-finals.

The heats for the men's 400 m took place on 24 September 1988. Todman finished seventh in his heat in a time of 50.11 seconds and he did not advance to the quarter-finals.

The heats for the men's 200 m took place on 26 September 1988. Hodge finished fifth in his heat in a time of 21.78 seconds and he did not advance to the quarter-finals.

Athlete	Event	Heat		Quarterfinal		Semifinal		Final	
Athlete	Event	Result	Rank	Result	Rank	Result	Rank	Result	Rank
Lindel Hodge	100 m	10.79	6	did not advance					
Lindel Hodge	200 m	21.78	5	did not advance					
Willis Todman	400 m	50.11	7	did not advance					

== Sailing ==
In total, one British Virgin Islander athlete participated in the sailing events – Matthew Arneborg in the men's division II.

The sailing events were held at the Busan Yachting Center in Busan, South Korea from 20 to 27 September 1988.

The seven races in the men's division II took place from 20 to 27 September 1988. Arneborg recorded his best finish in race two when they placed 22nd. In total, Arneborg accumulated a net 212 points and finished 29th overall.

Division II Rank	Helmsman (Country)	Race I		Race II		Race III		Race IV		Race V		Race VI		Race VII		Total Points	Total -1
Division II Rank	Helmsman (Country)	Rank	Points	Rank	Points	Rank	Points	Rank	Points	Rank	Points	Rank	Points	Rank	Points	Total Points	Total -1
29	Matthew Arneborg (IVB)	27	33.0	22	28.0	28	34.0	25	31.0	~~RET~~	~~52.0~~	28	34.0	RET	52.0	264.0	212.0
