= British Virgin Islands at the 1984 Summer Olympics =

- Flag of the British Virgin Islands
- IOC code: IVB
- NOC: British Virgin Islands Olympic Committee

in Los Angeles
- Competitors: 9 in 2 sports
- Flag bearer: Lindel Hodge
- Medals: Gold 0 Silver 0 Bronze 0 Total 0

Summer Olympics appearances (overview)
- 1984; 1988; 1992; 1996; 2000; 2004; 2008; 2012; 2016; 2020; 2024; 2028

The British Virgin Islands competed in the Olympic Games for the first time at the 1984 Summer Olympics in Los Angeles, United States.

== Athletics ==
Men

Athlete	Event	Heat		Quarterfinal		Semifinal		Final	
Athlete	Event	Result	Rank	Result	Rank	Result	Rank	Result	Rank
Guy Hill	100 m	11.11	6	did not advance					
Lindel Hodge	200 m	22.28	5	did not advance					
Dean Greenaway	400 m	47.33	5	did not advance					
Jerry Molyneaux	800 m	1:53.23	5	did not advance					
Guy Hill; Lindel Hodge; Dean Greenaway; Jerry Molyneaux	4 × 400 m relay	3:11.89	6	—N/a		did not advance			

Key

- Note–Ranks given for track events are within the athlete's heat only
- Q = Qualified for the next round
- q = Qualified for the next round as a fastest loser or, in field events, by position without achieving the qualifying target
- NR = National record
- N/A = Round not applicable for the event
- Bye = Athlete not required to compete in round

== Sailing ==
470 Rank	Helmsman (Country)	Crew	Race I		Race II		Race III		Race IV		Race V		Race VI		Race VII		Total Points	Total -1
470 Rank	Helmsman (Country)	Crew	Rank	Points	Rank	Points	Rank	Points	Rank	Points	Rank	Points	Rank	Points	Rank	Points	Total Points	Total -1
25	Keith Barker (IVB)	Peter Barker	22	28.0	25	31.0	24	30.0	22	28.0	YMP	23.0	24	30.0	~~DNF~~	~~35.0~~	205.0	170.0

Soling Rank	Helmsman (Country)	Crew	Race I		Race II		Race III		Race IV		Race V		Race VI		Race VII		Total	Total -1
Soling Rank	Helmsman (Country)	Crew	Rank	Points	Rank	Points	Rank	Points	Rank	Points	Rank	Points	Rank	Points	Rank	Points	Total	Total -1
21	Robin Tattersall (IVB)	Keith Thomas; Elvet Meyers	17	23.0	~~20~~	~~26.0~~	20	26.0	18	24.0	21	27.0	16	22.0	19	25.0	173.0	146.0
