= British Virgin Islands at the Olympics =

- Flag of the British Virgin Islands
- IOC code: IVB
- NOC: British Virgin Islands Olympic Committee
- Website: bviolympics.org
- Medals: Gold 0 Silver 0 Bronze 0 Total 0

Summer appearances
- 1984; 1988; 1992; 1996; 2000; 2004; 2008; 2012; 2016; 2020; 2024

Winter appearances
- 1984; 1988–2010; 2014; 2018–2026

The British Virgin Islands has competed in every Summer Olympic Games since 1984. The best placement by an athlete from the country is fourth, by Kyron McMaster in men's 400m hurdles in 2020.

The British Virgin Islands has competed twice at the Winter Olympic Games, first in 1984, and then in 2014. Their best placement in the Winter Olympic is 27th, by Peter Crook in the men's halfpipe skiing.

The team uses the islands' territorial anthem, "Oh, Beautiful Virgin Islands", starting in 2020. Prior to this, the team had used the anthem of the United Kingdom, "God Save the Queen".

== Medal tables ==
=== Medals by Summer Games ===
Games	Athletes	Gold	Silver	Bronze	Total	Rank
1984 Los Angeles	9	0	0	0	0	–
1988 Seoul	3	0	0	0	0	–
1992 Barcelona	4	0	0	0	0	–
1996 Atlanta	7	0	0	0	0	–
2000 Sydney	1	0	0	0	0	–
2004 Athens	1	0	0	0	0	–
2008 Beijing	2	0	0	0	0	–
2012 London	2	0	0	0	0	–
2016 Rio de Janeiro	4	0	0	0	0	–
2020 Tokyo	3	0	0	0	0	–
2024 Paris	4	0	0	0	0	–
2028 Los Angeles	future event					
2032 Brisbane	future event					
Total		0	0	0	0	–

=== Medals by Winter Games ===
Games	Athletes	Gold	Silver	Bronze	Total	Rank
1984 Sarajevo	1	0	0	0	0	–
1988–2010	did not participate					
2014 Sochi	1	0	0	0	0	–
2018 Pyeongchang	did not participate					
2022 Beijing	did not participate					
2026 Milano Cortina	did not participate					
2030 French Alps	future event					
2034 Utah	future event					
Total		0	0	0	0	–

== See also ==
- List of flag bearers for the British Virgin Islands at the Olympics
- Tropical nations at the Winter Olympics
