= British Virgin Islands at the 2012 Summer Olympics =

- Flag of the British Virgin Islands
- IOC code: IVB
- NOC: British Virgin Islands Olympic Committee
- Website: bviolympics.org

in London
- Competitors: 2 (1 man and 1 woman) in 1 sport
- Flag bearer: Tahesia Harrigan-Scott
- Medals: Gold 0 Silver 0 Bronze 0 Total 0

Summer Olympics appearances (overview)
- 1984; 1988; 1992; 1996; 2000; 2004; 2008; 2012; 2016; 2020; 2024

The British Virgin Islands sent a delegation to compete at the 2012 Summer Olympics in London, United Kingdom, which took place between 27 July to 12 August 2012. The country's participation in London marked its eighth appearance at the Summer Olympics since its debut in the 1984 Summer Olympics. The British Virgin Islands delegation included two track and field athletes, 100 meter sprinters J'maal Alexander and Tahesia Harrigan-Scott. Alexander failed to progress through the heats whilst Harrigan-Scott was eliminated in her event's quarterfinals.

== Background ==
The British Virgin Islands Olympic Committee was recognized by the International Olympic Committee on 31 December 1981. The territory joined Olympic competition at the 1984 Winter Olympics, and have had participated in every Summer Olympic Games since the 1984 Los Angeles Olympics. This made London their eighth appearance at a Summer Olympics. As of 2018, they have never won a medal in Olympic competition. The 2012 Summer Olympics were held from 27 July to 12 August 2012; a total of 10,568 athletes represented 204 National Olympic Committees. The British Virgin Islands delegation to London included two track and field athletes; J'maal Alexander and Tahesia Harrigan-Scott. Harrigan-Scott was chosen as the flag bearer for the parade of nations during the opening ceremony and for the closing ceremony. She had also been the flag bearer during the 2008 Summer Olympics opening ceremony four years prior.

== Athletics ==
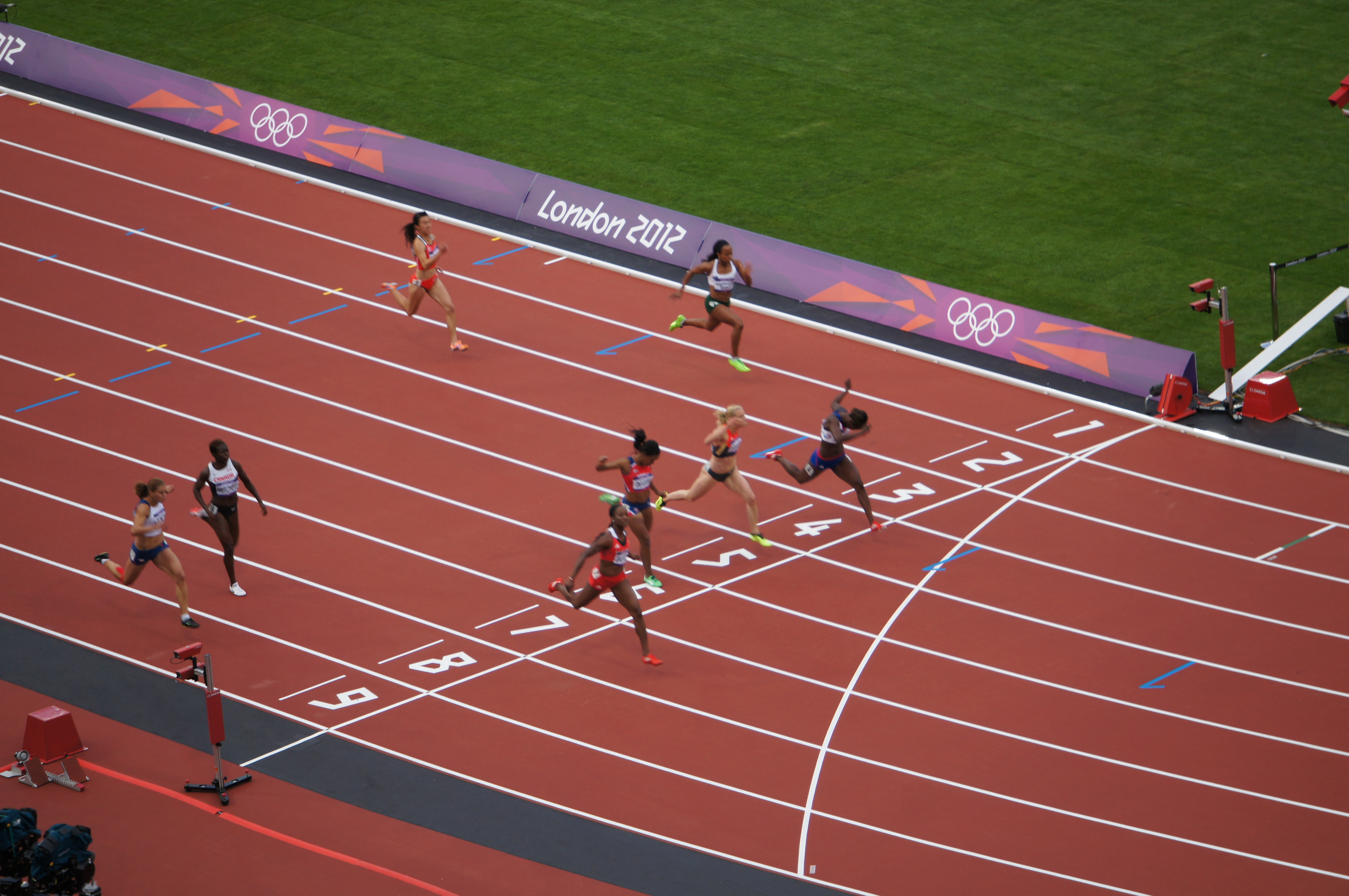
In this photo of competition during the 2012 Olympics, Harrigan-Scott is seen in lane two.

J'maal Alexander was 18 years old at the time of the London Olympics, and was making his Olympic debut. On 4 August, he took part in the preliminary round of the men's 100 meters. Assigned to heat three, he ran his race in a time of 10.92 seconds, fourth in his heat, but only the top two from each heat plus the next two fastest overall from all four heats could advance and he was eliminated, the slowest qualifying time being 10.80 seconds. The gold medal was eventually won by Usain Bolt of Jamaica in 9.63 seconds (an Olympic record time); silver was won by Yohan Blake also of Jamaica, and bronze was taken by the American Justin Gatlin.

Tahesia Harrigan-Scott was 30 years old at the time, and the native of the United States Virgin Islands had previously represented the British Virgin Islands at the 2008 Summer Olympics. She was the reigning bronze medalist from the 2008 IAAF World Indoor Championships in the 60 meters event. Because of her qualifying pre-Olympic time, she received a bye through the preliminary round on 3 August, which consisted of four heats. In the first round proper, which was the quarterfinals of the event, later that day, she was assigned to the first heat and ran a time of 11.59 seconds, which was seventh in her heat. As the top three from each heat plus the next three fastest from all seven heats advanced to the quarterfinals, this meant she was eliminated as the slowest qualifying time was 11.35 seconds. Gold was eventually won by Shelly-Ann Fraser-Pryce of Jamaica in 10.75 seconds; silver was won by Carmelita Jeter of the United States, and bronze was taken by Veronica Campbell-Brown, also of Jamaica. Harrigan-Scott would again go on to compete for the British Virgin Islands at the 2016 Summer Olympics.

Key

- Bye = Athlete not required to compete in round

Athlete	Event	Heat		Quarterfinal		Semifinal		Final	
Athlete	Event	Result	Rank	Result	Rank	Result	Rank	Result	Rank
J'maal Alexander	Men's 100 m	10.92	4	did not advance					
Tahesia Harrigan-Scott	Women's 100 m	Bye		11.59	7	did not advance			

- Note–Ranks given for track events are within the athlete's heat only

== See also ==
- British Virgin Islands at the 2011 Pan American Games
