= British Virgin Islands at the 2008 Summer Olympics =

- Flag of the British Virgin Islands
- IOC code: IVB
- NOC: British Virgin Islands Olympic Committee
- Website: bviolympics.org

in Beijing
- Competitors: 2 in 1 sports
- Flag bearer: Tahesia Harrigan
- Medals Ranked -th: Gold 0 Silver 0 Bronze 0 Total 0

Summer Olympics appearances (overview)
- 1984; 1988; 1992; 1996; 2000; 2004; 2008; 2012; 2016; 2020; 2024; 2028

The British Virgin Islands took part in the 2008 Summer Olympics which were held in Beijing, China from 8 to 24 August 2008. The dependency's participation at Beijing marked its seventh consecutive appearance in the summer Olympics since its debut in 1984, and its eighth Olympic appearance ever. The British Virgin Islander delegation included two athletes in 2008 participating in two distinct events in one sport: discus thrower Eric Matthias and sprinter Tahesia Harrigan. Of the athletes, Harrigan was the flagbearer and the first female Olympian to participate on behalf of the British Virgin Islands in its entire history. Overall, Harrigan advanced to quarterfinals in her event, although neither athlete medaled.

== Background ==
The British Virgin Islands participated in seven summer Olympic games between its debut in the 1984 Summer Olympics in Los Angeles and the 2008 Summer Olympics in Beijing. Their Olympic debut was at the 1984 Winter Olympics in Sarajevo, Yugoslavia, where the nation submitted a single athlete. The number of British Virgin Islanders participating in the summer games, excluding 1996 and 1984, included four or less athletes, and until Tahesia Harrigan in Beijing, only included men. Harrigan was the first female athlete to participate on behalf of the British Virgin Islands, and was its first female flagbearer. At Beijing, the British Virgin Islands were represented by two athletes, both in their twenties and both participating in track and field events: Eric Matthias and Tahesia Harrigan. Harrigan progressed to quarterfinals in her event, although neither athlete medaled.

== Athletics ==
=== Men's competition ===
Former Boise State University student Eric Matthias participated on behalf of the British Virgin Islands at the discus throw event. He was one of two British Virgin Islanders participating in a track and field event and in the 2008 Olympics as a whole. Matthias' appearance in Beijing marked his first appearance at any Olympic game. Once at the Olympics, Matthias was placed in the second qualifying heat on 16 August. He threw the discus 53.11 meters, ranking last out of 18 athletes. The 17th place finalist in the second qualifying heat, Iraq's Haidar Nasser Shaheed, threw 1.08 meters further, with heat leader Rutger Smith of the Netherlands throwing the discus 12.54 meters further than Matthias. Overall, out of 37 athletes, Matthias placed last, and did not progress to the final round on 19 August.

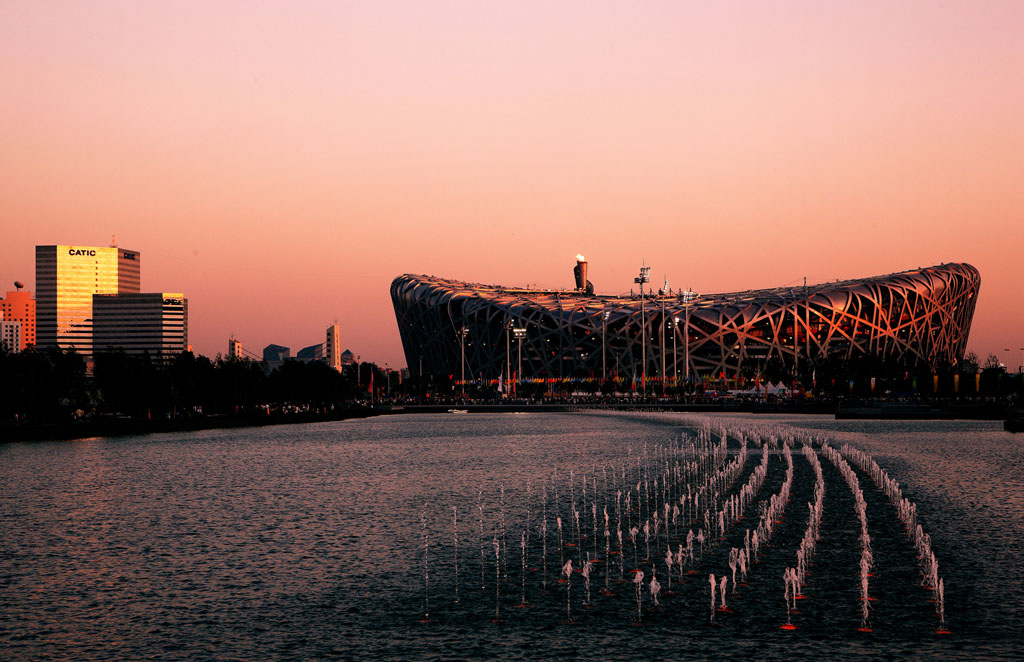
The Beijing National Stadium, where Matthias and Harrigan competed in track and field events

=== Women's competition ===
University of Alabama graduate and single parent Tahesia Harrigan was the sole female competitor from the British Virgin Islands, and one of two participating in a track and field event and for the BVI as a whole. Her appearance at Beijing was her first Olympic appearance; she did not compete in the 2004 Summer Olympics in Athens because she was pregnant at the time. When at the Olympics, Harrigan competed in the first round of the 100 m dash on 15 August, where she was placed in Heat 2 against, among others, Lauryn Williams of the United States and Christine Arron of France. Harrigan ranked third in a heat of eight athletes with a time of 11.46 seconds, placing behind Williams by 0.08 seconds and ahead of Brazil's Lucimar Moura by 0.14 seconds. Overall, Harrigan tied Jade Latoya Bailey of Barbados for 25th place out of 85. She progressed to the next round.

Harrigan competed in the second round on 16 August, placed in Heat 4 against Williams, Jamaica's Kerron Stewart, and Belgium's Kim Gevaert, among others. She placed fifth out of eight athletes with a time of 11.36 seconds; she was 0.10 seconds ahead of sixth place heat finalist Semoy Hackett of Trinidad and Tobago and 0.12 seconds behind Belarusian fourth place heat finalist Yuliya Nestsiarenka. Overall, she tied Arron for 16th place out of 40 athletes. Harrigan did not progress further.

=== Summary ===
Men

Athlete	Event	Qualification		Final	
Athlete	Event	Distance	Position	Distance	Position
Eric Matthias	Discus throw	53.11	37	Did not advance	

Women

Athlete	Event	Heat		Quarterfinal		Semifinal		Final	
Athlete	Event	Result	Rank	Result	Rank	Result	Rank	Result	Rank
Tahesia Harrigan	100 m	11.46	3 Q	11.36	5	Did not advance			

Key

- Note–Ranks given for track events are within the athlete's heat only
- Q = Qualified for the next round
- q = Qualified for the next round as a fastest loser or, in field events, by position without achieving the qualifying target
- NR = National record
- N/A = Round not applicable for the event
- Bye = Athlete not required to compete in round

== See also ==
- British Virgin Islands at the 2007 Pan American Games
- British Virgin Islands at the 2010 Central American and Caribbean Games
