= British Virgin Islands at the 2000 Summer Olympics =

- Flag of the British Virgin Islands
- IOC code: IVB
- NOC: British Virgin Islands Olympic Committee
- Website: bviolympics.org

in Sydney
- Competitors: 1 (man) in 1 sport
- Flag bearer: Keita Cline
- Medals: Gold 0 Silver 0 Bronze 0 Total 0

Summer Olympics appearances (overview)
- 1984; 1988; 1992; 1996; 2000; 2004; 2008; 2012; 2016; 2020; 2024

The British Virgin Islands sent a delegation to compete at the 2000 Summer Olympics in Sydney, Australia from 15 September to 1 October 2000. This was the territory's fifth appearance at a Summer Olympic Games. The delegation consisted of a single track and field athlete, Keita Cline. He was eliminated during the first round of the men's 200 meters.

== Background ==
The British Virgin Islands Olympic Committee was recognized by the International Olympic Committee on 31 December 1981. The British Virgin Islands joined Olympic competition at the 1984 Winter Olympics, and have participated in every Summer Olympic Games since the 1984 Los Angeles Olympics. Sydney was therefore their fifth appearance at the Summer Olympics. The Islands have never won an Olympic medal. The 2000 Summer Olympics were held from 15 September to 1 October 2000; a total of 10,651 athletes represented 199 National Olympic Committees. The delegation to Sydney consisted of a single athlete, Keita Cline. He was chosen as the flag bearer for the opening ceremony.

== Competitors ==
The following is the list of number of competitors in the Games.

Sport	Men	Women	Total
Athletics	1	0	1
Total	1	0	1

== Athletics ==
Keita Cline was 25 years old at the time of the Sydney Olympics; the US Virgin Islands native had previously represented the British Virgin Islands at the 1996 Summer Olympics, where he participated in the 4 × 100 metres relay and the long jump. His only event was the men's 200 meters, and on 27 September he was drawn into heat four of nine of the first round. The top three in a heat, plus the next five overall fastest athletes advanced to the quarterfinals. He finished his heat in a time of 21.42 seconds, seventh and last in his heat, and was eliminated, the slowest qualifying time being 20.95 seconds. The gold medal was eventually won by Konstantinos Kenteris of Greece in a time of 20.09 seconds, the silver was won by Darren Campbell of Great Britain, and the bronze by Ato Boldon of Trinidad and Tobago.

Athlete	Event	Heat		Quarterfinal		Semifinal		Final	
Athlete	Event	Result	Rank	Result	Rank	Result	Rank	Result	Rank
Keita Cline	Men's 200 m	21.42	7	Did not advance					

- Note–Ranks given for track events are within the athlete's heat only
