= Flag of the Virgin Islands =

Flag of the Virgin Islands can mean:

- Flag of the British Virgin Islands
- Flag of the United States Virgin Islands
