= Robert Hirst =

Robert Hirst may refer to:

- Rob Hirst (1955–2026), Australian musician
- Robert Hirst (sailor) (born 1971), British Virgin Islands sailor
