= British Virgin Islands at the 2014 Winter Olympics =

- Flag of the British Virgin Islands
- IOC code: IVB
- NOC: British Virgin Islands Olympic Committee
- Website: bviolympics.org

in Sochi
- Competitors: 1 in 1 sport
- Flag bearers: Peter Crook (opening and closing)
- Medals: Gold 0 Silver 0 Bronze 0 Total 0

Winter Olympics appearances (overview)
- 1984; 1988–2010; 2014; 2018–2022; 2026; 2030

The British Virgin Islands sent a delegation to compete at the 2014 Winter Olympics in Sochi, Russia from 7–23 February 2014. This was the second Winter Olympic Games appearance for the territory, after the 1984 Winter Olympics. The team consisted of one athlete, the freestyle skier Peter Crook, who became the territory's second Winter Olympian ever. In the men's halfpipe, he came in 27th place.

== Background ==
The British Virgin Islands Olympic Committee was recognized by the International Olympic Committee on 31 December 1981. The British Virgin Islands joined Olympic competition at the 1984 Winter Olympics, and have they have participated in every Summer Olympic Games since the 1984 Los Angeles Olympics. The only prior Winter Olympics appearance for the British Virgin Islands had come 30 years prior, in Sarajevo at the 1984 Winter Olympics. The British Virgin Islands' delegation to Sochi consisted of a single competitor, freestyle skier Peter Crook. Crook was only the second Winter Olympian ever for the territory. The chef de mission for the delegation was Mark Chapman, who is a chartered accountant and has served as the treasurer of the British Virgin Islands Olympic Committee. Crook was selected as the flag bearer for both the opening ceremony and closing ceremony.

== Freestyle skiing ==
According to the final quota allocation released on 20 January 2014, The British Virgin Islands had one athlete in qualification position. Peter Crook was 21 years old at the time of the Sochi Olympics. On 18 February, he competed in the qualifying round of the men's halfpipe, held in heavy snow. In the qualification round, each skier was given two runs, with the best of the two runs determining placement; the top 16 were allowed to advance. In his first run, Crook scored 24.20 points, and a higher 25.20 points in his second run. However, this was only enough for 27th place, and Crook was therefore eliminated. With his Olympic participation concluded, the territory did not win a medal at these Games.

Athlete	Event	Qualification				Final			
Athlete	Event	Run 1	Run 2	Best	Rank	Run 1	Run 2	Best	Rank
Peter Crook	Men's halfpipe	24.20	25.20	25.20	27	did not advance			

== See also ==
- British Virgin Islands at the 2014 Commonwealth Games
- British Virgin Islands at the 2014 Summer Youth Olympics
