= Alexander O. Shirley =

British Virgin Islands cricketer (1927–2016)

Alexander Ogilvie Shirley, MBE, (14 May 1927 – 4 January 2016) was a British Virgin Islands cricketer, civil servant, and social activist who pioneered the development of cricket in the territory. He was the Accountant General of the British Virgin Islands from 1967 until his retirement in 1987.

The British Virgin Islands' New Recreation Ground were renamed the A. O. Shirley Recreation Ground in his honor in June 1990. Shirley, in his role as Accountant General of the BVI, requested land from the Administrator of the British Virgin Islands (now called the Governor) to construct the New Recreation Ground on Tortola. The A. O. Shirley Recreation Ground, located in Road Town, remained the territory's main cricket field until 2005, when the sport relocated to the Mondo athletic facility. Shirley remains the only BVI athlete to have a cricket field named after him. Today, the A. O. Shirley Recreation Grounds are a multi-sport venue for cricket, football, track and field, and school sports.

Shirley began his career as a medium pace bowler for the Junior Cricket Club. After the Club broke-up into the Blitz and Atomics. Shirley eventually played for Bucks, with whom he won several league titles. Shirley, a former President of the BVI Cricket Association, managed the BVI cricket team during the Leeward Islands Cricket Association's tournament. He also was on the board of the Leeward Islands Cricket Association from 1991 to 1998. He retired from cricket in 1998.

Shirley was the Accountant General of the British Virgin Islands from 1967 until his retirement in 1987. Prior to becoming Accountant General, Shirley held positions throughout the territory's civil service, including the Departments of Customs, Inland Revenue, which was the tax collector in the BVI at the time, Education, Post Office, and Agriculture. He also was acting Financial Secretary of the British Virgin Islands.

Shirley was awarded the Member of the Most Excellent Order of the British Empire (MBE) in November 1969 for his work in the civil service.

Shirley was an active member of the Anglican Church.

Shirley died at Peebles Hospital in Road Town, British Virgin Islands, on 4 January 2016, at the age of 88. He was the chairman of the Legal Aide Board of the BVI at the time of his death. Shirley was survived by two children and three sisters. His son, John Shirley, competed as a sailor for the British Virgin Islands at the 1992 Summer Olympics in Barcelona.
