= List of British Virgin Islands records in swimming =

The British Virgin Islands records in swimming are the fastest ever performances of swimmers from British Virgin Islands, which are recognised and ratified by the British Virgin Islands Swimming Association.

All records were set in finals unless noted otherwise.

== Long Course (50 m) ==
=== Men ===
Event	Time	Name	Club	Date	Meet	Location	Ref
50 m freestyle							
100 m freestyle							
200 m freestyle							
400 m freestyle							
800 m freestyle							
1500 m freestyle							
50 m backstroke							
100 m backstroke							
200 m backstroke							
50 m breaststroke							
100 m breaststroke							
200 m breaststroke							
50m butterfly							
100 m butterfly							
200 m butterfly							
200 m individual medley							
400 m individual medley							
4×100 m freestyle relay							
4×200 m freestyle relay							
4×100 m medley relay							

Legend: # – Record awaiting ratification by British Virgin Islands Swimming Association; WR – World record; AM – Americas record;
Records not set in finals: h – heat; sf – semifinal; r – relay 1st leg; rh – relay heat 1st leg; b – B final; † – en route to final mark; tt – time trial

=== Women ===
Event	Time		Name	Club	Date	Meet	Location	Ref
50 m freestyle	25.74	h	Elinah Phillip	British Virgin Islands	30 July 2021	Olympic Games	Tokyo, Japan	
100 m freestyle	58.98		Elinah Phillip	British Virgin Islands	1 April 2018	CARIFTA Championships	St. Andrew, Jamaica	
200 m freestyle								
400 m freestyle								
800 m freestyle								
1500 m freestyle								
50 m backstroke								
100 m backstroke								
200 m backstroke								
50m breaststroke								
100 m breaststroke								
200 m breaststroke								
50m butterfly	28.13		Elinah Phillip	British Virgin Islands	16 April 2017	CARIFTA Championships	Nassau, The Bahamas	
100m butterfly	1:08.60	h	Amarah Phillip	British Virgin Islands	2 August 2015	World Championships	Kazan, Russia	
200 m butterfly								
200 m individual medley								
400 m individual medley								
4×100 m freestyle relay								
4×200 m freestyle relay								
4×100 m medley relay								

Legend: # – Record awaiting ratification by British Virgin Islands Swimming Association; WR – World record; AM – Americas record;
Records not set in finals: h – heat; sf – semifinal; r – relay 1st leg; rh – relay heat 1st leg; b – B final; † – en route to final mark; tt – time trial

== Short Course (25 m) ==
=== Men ===
Event	Time	Name	Club	Date	Meet	Location	Ref
50m freestyle							
100m freestyle							
200 m freestyle							
400 m freestyle							
800 m freestyle							
1500 m freestyle							
50 m backstroke							
100 m backstroke							
200 m backstroke							
50m breaststroke							
100m breaststroke							
200 m breaststroke							
50m butterfly							
100m butterfly							
200 m butterfly							
100 m individual medley							
200 m individual medley							
400 m individual medley							
4×50 m freestyle relay							
4×100 m freestyle relay							
4×200 m freestyle relay							
4×50 m medley relay							
4×100 m medley relay							

Legend: # – Record awaiting ratification by British Virgin Islands Swimming Association; WR – World record; AM – Americas record;
Records not set in finals: h – heat; sf – semifinal; r – relay 1st leg; rh – relay heat 1st leg; b – B final; † – en route to final mark; tt – time trial

=== Women ===
Event	Time		Name	Club	Date	Meet	Location	Ref
50m freestyle	25.62	h	Elinah Phillip	British Virgin Islands	28 September 2018	World Cup	Eindhoven, Netherlands	
100m freestyle	59.30	h	Elinah Phillip	British Virgin Islands	4 December 2014	World Championships	Doha, Qatar	
200 m freestyle								
400 m freestyle								
800 m freestyle								
1500 m freestyle								
50m backstroke								
100m backstroke								
200m backstroke								
50m breaststroke								
100m breaststroke								
200 m breaststroke								
50m butterfly	30.81	h	Amarah Phillip	British Virgin Islands	4 December 2014	World Championships	Doha, Qatar	
100m butterfly	1:06.77	h	Elinah Phillip	British Virgin Islands	6 December 2014	World Championships	Doha, Qatar	
200 m butterfly								
100m individual medley								
200 m individual medley								
400 m individual medley								
4×50 m freestyle relay								
4×100 m freestyle relay								
4×200 m freestyle relay								
4×50 m medley relay								
4×100 m medley relay								

Legend: # – Record awaiting ratification by British Virgin Islands Swimming Association; WR – World record; AM – Americas record;
Records not set in finals: h – heat; sf – semifinal; r – relay 1st leg; rh – relay heat 1st leg; b – B final; † – en route to final mark; tt – time trial
