= British Virgin Islands Athletics Association =

Governing body for athletics in the British Virgin Islands

- Sport: Athletics
- Jurisdiction: Association
- Abbreviation: BVIAA
- Founded: 1970
- Affiliation: IAAF
- Affiliation date: 1972
- Regional affiliation: NACAC
- Headquarters: Road Town, Tortola
- President: Steve Augustine
- Vice president: Ralston Henry
- Secretary: Stephanie Russ Penn
- Replaced: British Virgin Islands Amateur Athletic Association

Official website
- bvi.milesplit.com
- (British Virgin Islands)

The British Virgin Islands Athletics Association (BVIAA) is the governing body for the sport of athletics in the British Virgin Islands. Current president is Steve Augustine. He was elected for the first time in 2016.

== History ==
BVIAA was founded in September 1970 as British Virgin Islands Amateur Athletic Association and was affiliated to the IAAF in March 1972. "Amateur" was dropped from the association’s name during an Executive Committee meeting on February 10, 2009.

== Affiliations ==
BVIAA is the national member federation for the British Virgin Islands in the following international organisations:

- International Association of Athletics Federations (IAAF)
- North American, Central American and Caribbean Athletic Association (NACAC)
- Association of Panamerican Athletics (APA)
- Central American and Caribbean Athletic Confederation (CACAC)
- Leeward Islands Athletics Association (LIAA)

Moreover, it is part of the following national organisations:

- British Virgin Islands Olympic Committee (BVIOC)

== National records ==
BVIAA maintains the British Virgin Islands records in athletics.

== See also ==
- Sport in the British Virgin Islands
- British Virgin Islands Football Association
- British Virgin Islands Olympic Committee
