= Coat of arms of the British Virgin Islands =

National coat of arms of the Virgin Islands

- Adopted: 15 November 1960 (65 years ago)
- Shield: Vert a Virgin proper vested Argent sandalled or holding in the dexter hand by the chain an Ancient Lamp Gold enflamed also proper between eleven like Lamps five in pale to the dexter and six in pale to the sinister
- Motto: Latin: Vigilate

The coat of arms of the British Virgin Islands consists of a green escutcheon (shield) charged with a woman in a white dress and gold-coloured sandals, holding a lit golden oil lamp and surrounded by eleven other golden lamps. Adopted shortly after the islands became a Crown colony, it has been the coat of arms of the British Virgin Islands since 1960. The escutcheon dates from the early 19th century and is featured on the flag of the territory. The woman and the lamps represent Saint Ursula and her companions, the namesake of the islands.

== History ==
The Virgin Islands were first sighted and named by Christopher Columbus in 1493, during his second journey to the West Indies. The territory was claimed by the Spanish in 1555 under a detachment dispatched by Charles V, Holy Roman Emperor, but they did not establish any settlements there. Privateers from the Dutch Republic settled on several of the islands and governed them until 1666, when English planters – together with "brigands and pirates" – began inhabiting the territory and forced many of the Dutch colonists to leave. The English subsequently seized control of the islands six years later at the outset of the Third Anglo-Dutch War, placing them under the administration of the British Leeward Islands.

Responsible government was accorded to the Virgin Islanders in 1773, with a judiciary and a partially-elected legislature. The design of the present-day coat of arms first emerged around the early 19th century. However, the territory did not use its own symbols until it became a Crown colony, with the Union Jack serving as the official state flag of the islands. The legislature was disbanded in 1901 and authority over the islands was transferred to the governor of the Leeward Islands, who exercised power through a commissioner and an executive council that he selected. Self-government was eventually restored in 1950 and the Leeward Islands federation was dissolved in 1956. The British Virgin Islands, nevertheless, opted not to join the West Indies Federation when it was created two years later. It instead became a Crown colony in 1960, and a royal warrant was consequently issued on 15 November of the same year granting the territory its own coat of arms. It was then employed on the Blue Ensign to create the flag of the British Virgin Islands. This was redesigned in 1999, with the size of the shield increased and outlined in white.

Coat of arms of the British Leeward Islands (1909–1940)

Coat of arms of the British Leeward Islands (1940–1956)

== Design ==
The coat of arms of the British Virgin Islands were blazoned by the royal warrant of 15 November 1960 as follows:

Vert a Virgin proper vested Argent sandalled or holding in the dexter hand by the chain an Ancient Lamp Gold enflamed also proper between eleven like Lamps five in pale to the dexter and six in pale to the sinister, together with the motto Vigilate.

=== Symbolism ===
The colours and objects on the coat of arms carry cultural, political, and regional meanings. The woman wearing a white dress and clutching a golden oil lamp is Saint Ursula, who is both the namesake and the patron saint of the Virgin Islands. The eleven other oil lamps allude to her eleven virgin companions (other accounts assert that she actually had 11,000 followers). They were purportedly martyred by the Huns in Cologne, Germania Inferior, during the fourth or fifth century. Columbus consequently named the islands Santa Ursula y las Once Mil Vírgenes ('Saint Ursula and the Eleven Thousand Virgins'), in honour of the aforementioned group of saints. This was abbreviated to Las Vírgenes ('The Virgins'). The motto in Latin on a ribbon scroll under the escutcheon – Vigilate – means 'be vigilant'.

=== Uses ===
Both the shield and motto from the arms are featured on the flag of the British Virgin Islands, and on the standard of the territory's governor. In the latter banner, the escutcheon is encircled by a wreath of two green branches that are interlaced in the middle with a blue bow.

== See also ==
- List of coats of arms of the United Kingdom and dependencies
- Caribbean heraldry

== Sources ==
- Heraldry of the World: British Virgin Islands
