= 2017 IAAF World Relays – Women's 4 × 200 metres relay =

Women's 4 × 200 metres relay at the 2017 IAAF World Relays
- Venue: Thomas Robinson Stadium
- Dates: 22 April (heats), 23 April (final)
- Competitors: 36 from 9 nations

Medalists
gold medal	Jura Levy; Shericka Jackson; Sashalee Forbes; Elaine Thompson; Anastasia Le-Roy*	Jamaica
silver medal	Lara Matheis; Tatjana Pinto; Rebekka Haase; Gina Lückenkemper; Alexandra Burghardt*; Lisa Mayer*	Germany
bronze medal	Dezerea Bryant; Tiffany Townsend; Felicia Brown; Shalonda Solomon; Phyllis Francis*	United States

The women's 4 × 200 metres relay at the 2017 IAAF World Relays was held at the Thomas Robinson Stadium on 22–23 April.

The heats were held only to eliminate one team to make a field of eight. That team turned out to be Kenya, whose national record still fell almost 6 seconds behind as a time qualifier.

After being beaten by Nigeria two years earlier, Jamaica took this race seriously. Out of the blocks Jura Levy opened up a gap on the US to her inside and gained on Trinidad and Tobago's Kamaria Durant to her outside. Passing to Shericka Jackson well into the second turn of the four turn stagger race, Jamaica had already made up the offset on both teams to their outside. Jackson slightly pulled away from the last visible competitor, China's Liang Xiaojing already down a full lap's stagger two lanes away. Jackson passed to Sashalee Forbes almost alone. More than 10 metres behind, Germany's Tatjana Pinto passed to Rebekka Haase and USA's Tiffany Townsend passed to Felicia Brown about even. Through the next leg Forbes was all alone while Hasse caught and edge ahead of Townsend to her outside before Townsend caught back up. Out front, Forbes passed to Elaine Thompson before any other team's anchor runner even had started to move. With almost a 15-metre lead, and the double Olympic Champion on anchor, victory was assured. Townsend regained her stagger advantage and a little more going into the USA handoff to Shalonda Solomon but Germany's Gina Lückenkemper quickly gained through the turn opening up a 2-metre lead. Thompson merely extended lead for an easy Jamaican win. Behind her, Solomon accelerated but was only able to close down less than a metre, Lückenkemper getting silver for Germany.

== Records ==
Prior to the competition, the records were as follows:

World record	United States Blue (LaTasha Jenkins, LaTasha Colander, Nanceen Perry, Marion Jones)	1:27.46	Philadelphia, United States	29 April 2000
Championship record	United States (Shalonda Solomon, Tawanna Meadows, Bianca Knight, Kimberlyn Duncan)	1:29.45	(The Bahamas) Nassau, Bahamas	25 May 2014
World Leading	Tumbleweed Track Club (Desiree Henry United Kingdom, Anyika Onuora United Kingdom, Tianna Bartoletta United States, Dafne Schippers Netherlands)	1:28.77	Gainesville, United States	1 April 2017
African Record	Nigeria (Blessing Okagbare, Regina George, Dominique Duncan, Christy Udoh)	1:30.52	(The Bahamas) Nassau, Bahamas	2 May 2015
Asian Record	China (Yuan Qiqi, Kong Lingwei, Liang Xiaojing, Lin Huijun)	1:34.89	(The Bahamas) Nassau, Bahamas	2 May 2015
North, Central American and Caribbean record	United States Blue (LaTasha Jenkins, LaTasha Colander, Nanceen Perry, Marion Jones)	1:27.46	Philadelphia, United States	29 April 2000
South American Record	No official record			
European Record	East Germany (Marlies Göhr, Romy Müller, Bärbel Wöckel, Marita Koch)	1:28.15	Jena, East Germany	9 August 1980
Oceanian record	No official record			

== Schedule ==
Date	Time	Round
22 April 2017	21:40	Heat 1

All times are local times (UTC−4)

== Results ==
KEY:	WL	World leading	AR	Area record	NR	National record	SB	Seasonal best

=== Heats ===
Qualification: First 2 of each heat (Q) plus the 2 fastest times (q) advanced to the final.

Rank	Heat 1	Lane	Nation	Athletes	Time	Notes
1	1	4	United States	Dezerea Bryant, Tiffany Townsend, Felicia Brown, Phyllis Francis	1:31.04	Q
2	1	3	Germany	Lara Matheis, Alexandra Burghardt, Rebekka Haase, Lisa Mayer	1:31.16	Q, SB
3	2	4	Jamaica	Elaine Thompson, Shericka Jackson, Jura Levy, Anastasia Le-Roy	1:31.29	Q, SB
4	1	5	Trinidad and Tobago	Kamaria Durant, Semoy Hackett, Reyare Thomas, Michelle-Lee Ahye	1:32.62	Q, NR
5	2	3	Nigeria	Jennifer Madu, Patience George, Dominique Duncan, Ugonna Ndu	1:33.78	Q, SB
6	2	6	China	Tao Yujia, Zhou Yanbing, Tian Wen, Wei Yongli	1:33.99	Q, AR
7	1	7	France	Jennifer Galais, Estelle Raffai, Fanny Peltier, Estelle Perrossier	1:34.18	q, SB
8	2	4	British Virgin Islands	Nelda Huggins, Tahesia Harrigan-Scott, Karene King, Ashley Kelly	1:34.92	q, NR
9	1	6	Kenya	Maximila Imali, Mary Chepkoech, Peris Wairimu Chege, Damaris Akoth	1:40.65	NR

=== Final ===
The final was started at 23:32.

Rank	Lane	Nation	Athletes	Time	Notes	Points
1st place, gold medalist(s)	6	Jamaica	Jura Levy, Shericka Jackson, Sashalee Forbes, Elaine Thompson,	1:29.04	CR	8
2nd place, silver medalist(s)	3	Germany	Lara Matheis, Tatjana Pinto, Rebekka Haase, Gina Lückenkemper	1:30.68	SB	7
3rd place, bronze medalist(s)	4	United States	Dezerea Bryant, Tiffany Townsend, Felicia Brown, Shalonda Solomon	1:30.87		6
4	7	Trinidad and Tobago	Kamaria Durant, Semoy Hackett, Reyare Thomas, Kai Selvon	1:32.63		5
5	5	Nigeria	Jennifer Madu, Patience George, Dominique Duncan, Ugonna Ndu	1:33.08	SB	4
6	1	France	Jennifer Galais, Estelle Raffai, Fanny Peltier, Estelle Perrossier	1:35.11		3
7	2	British Virgin Islands	Nelda Huggins, Tahesia Harrigan-Scott, Karene King, Ashley Kelly	1:35.35		2
8	5	China	Tao Yujia, Liang Xiaojing, Tian Wen, Yuan Qiqi	1:37.60		1
