= Adaejah Hodge =

British Virgin Islands athlete

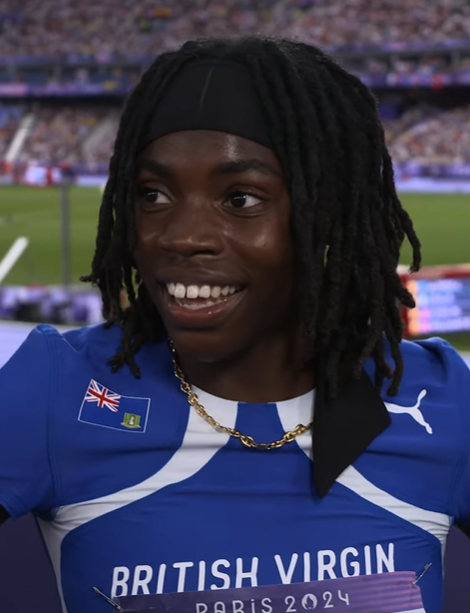
- Hodge in 2024

Personal information
- Nationality: British Virgin Islands
- Born: 21 March 2006 (age 20) Tortola, British Virgin Islands

Sport
- Sport: Athletics
- Event: Sprint

Achievements and titles
- Personal bests: 100m: 10.63 (Eugene, 2026) NR; 200m: 21.68 (Eugene, 2026) NR
Medal record
Women's athletics
Representing British Virgin Islands
Commonwealth Games
Gold medal – first place	2026 Glasglow	200 m
World U20 Championships
Disqualified	2024 Lima	200 m
Disqualified	2024 Lima	100 m

Adaejah Hodge (born 21 March 2006) is a sprinter from the British Virgin Islands. She won the 200 metres titles at the 2026 Commonwealth Games, 2026 NCAA Indoor Championships and 2026 NCAA Outdoor Championships, and competed at the 2023 World Athletics Championships and 2024 Olympic Games.

In March 2026, the Athletics Integrity Unit (AIU) announced that Hodge had served an unannounced doping ban from August 2024 to January 2026. Hodge had tested positive for the banned substance GW501516 at the 2024 World U20 Championships in Lima, where she won the gold medal in the 200m and the silver medal in the 100m. Although those results were disqualified, the AIU gave Hodge a reduced ban for cooperating with the investigation. Hodge's teammate Issam Assinga and coach Gerald Phiri were both sanctioned for offenses involving the same substance.

== Early life ==
From Douglasville, Georgia, Hodge attended school at Montverde Academy. In 2022, she was named the Georgia High Schools Association Track and Field Athlete of the Year. In November 2023, she signed a letter of intent to run for the University of Georgia.

== Career ==
=== 2022-23: World Championship debut ===
In April 2022, Hodge won the girls’ Under-17 100m, 200m and long jump at the Carifta Games in Jamaica. While attending Montverde Academy in Florida under coach Gerald Phiri, she ran an indoor U20 world record time of 22.33 seconds for the 200m at the New Balance Nationals Indoor in Boston, Massachusetts in March 2023, surpassing the time of 22.40 set in 2008 by Bianca Knight. The time broke the US girls' high school indoor 200m record by more than half a second, and placed her second on the all-time high school all-conditions list, behind Allyson Felix. The race came ten days before her seventeenth birthday.

In April 2023, she set a new national junior record for the 100 metres, running 11.12 seconds. Shortly after, in that same month, she lowered it again, running 11.11 seconds in Lubbock, Texas. In June, she broke the British Virgin Islands senior national record in the 200 metres in Montverde, Florida. Her time of 22.60 seconds broke the previous best of 22.98 seconds held by Tahesia Harrigan-Scott since 2007.

Selected for the 200 metres at the 2023 World Athletics Championships in Budapest in August 2023, she ran a time of 22.82 seconds and qualified for the semi-finals. She became only the third-ever women athlete from the British Virgin Islands to achieve this feat.

=== 2024: Olympic debut, World U20 championships ===
Hodge was part of the Montverde Academy team which broke the US national high school record in the indoor 4x400 metre relay at the VA Showcase in February 2024, alongside Michelle Smith, Alivia Williams and Skyler Franklin.

As an 18 year-old, Hodge competed at the 2024 Summer Olympics in Paris, France, over 200 metres, and was the youngest competitor in the event. via the repechage round, Hodge became the first BVI athlete to advance to the Olympic semi-finals in the 200m, running 22.70 seconds to place eighth in her semi-final race, in August 2024.

Later that month, Hodge was first across the line in the 200 metres at the 2024 World Athletics U20 Championships in Lima, Peru, running the final in 22.74 (0.0 m/s) to finish ahead of fellow Paris Olympian, Torrie Lewis of Australia. Hodge had also previously finished second in the women's 100 metres at the championships, running a time of 11.27 seconds in the final to finish behind Alana Reid of Jamaica. However, Hodge's results were later annulled and she was given a ban for a prohibited metabolic modulator in her findings from the championships. Hodge received a shortened sentence after she provided substantial assistance to anti-doping authorities and it was determined on the balance of probabilities that she ingested the substance unknowingly. The substance in her system, GW501516, was similarly found in her Montverde teammate, Issam Asinga, and was found in the possession of their coach Gerald Phiri who had three athletes banned for the substance between 2023 and 2024.

=== 2025-present: Fifth fastest woman all-time and Commonwealth title ===
Hodge was named one of seven official ambassadors for the 2025 Junior Pan American Games by Panam Sports. Having not raced since August 2024, Hodge was eligible to return to racing on 28 January 2026.

Hodge made her debut competing indoors for the Georgia Bulldogs in Fayetteville, Arkansas and ran 7.16 seconds for the 60 metres, and set a meeting record of 22.53 seconds for the 200 metres, at the Razorback International on 31 January 2026.

In February, Hodge ran a personal best time of 22.32 seconds to win the 200 meters ahead of JaMeesia Ford at the 2026 SEC Indoor Championships. Competing at the 2026 NCAA Division I Indoor Track and Field Championships on her twentieth birthday on 13 March, she ran a 22.28 seconds for the 200 metres in the preliminary round, before running a new personal best the following day to win both the NCAA indoor 200m title, with 22.22 beating the rest of the field by 0.33 seconds. She also placed second in the 60 metres final behind Shenese Walker of Jamaica, running 7.15 seconds. Her performances helped Georgia to win the team title at the championships in Fayetteville.

On 18 April 2026, she moved to second on the NCAA all-time list for the 100 m, behind only Sha'Carri Richardson, with 10.77 seconds in Gainesville, Florida. In May, she became the fourth fastest collegian all-time with 21.92 for the 200 m at the SEC Championships, to trail only Abby Steiner, McKenzie Long and Julien Alfred. That month, she set a facility record of 10.86 seconds in the 100 metres in the preliminary round at the East Regionals in Lexington, Kentucky, surpassing the previous best set by Long in 2024. On 11 June, Hodge moved to fifth on the all-time 100 metres list with a new NCAA record of 10.63 seconds in the semi-finals of the 2026 NCAA Outdoor Championships in Eugene. On 13 June, Hodge broke the collegiate record in the 200 metres to win in 21.68 seconds and placed second to Walker in the 100 metres final. On 4 July, she placed third in the 100 metres at the 2026 Prefontaine Classic, running 10.80 seconds (+0.0). On 10 July, she placed second behind Alfred in 21.76 seconds in the 200 metres at the 2026 Herculis Diamond League event in Monaco.

Competing at the 2026 Commonwealth Games in Glasgow, Scotland, Hodge set a new Games record for the 200 metres in the semi-final on 30 July, despite slowing down clearly in the final metres, running a time of 22.01 (+1.7). The following day, Hodge won the gold medal in cold conditions running 22.07 seconds.

== Athletics achievements ==
Information from her World Athletics profile unless otherwise noted.

=== Personal bests ===
Type	Distance	Time (s)	Wind (m/s)	Venue	Date	Notes
Individual events
Indoor	60 metres	7.12	—N/a	Fayetteville, United States	13 March 2026	
Indoor	200 metres sh	22.22	—N/a	Fayetteville, United States	14 March 2026	NR
Indoor	300 metres sh	36.97	—N/a	Virginia Beach, United States	12 January 2024	NBP
Indoor	400 metres sh	54.30	—N/a	Columbia, United States	18 February 2022	
Outdoor	100 metres	10.63	+1.9	Eugene, United States	11 June 2026	NR
Outdoor	200 metres	21.68	-0.4	Eugene, United States	13 June 2026	NR
Outdoor	400 metres	51.24	—N/a	Coral Gables, United States	28 March 2026	NR
Team events
Indoor	4 × 200 metres relay sh	1:34.78	—N/a	New York City, United States	11 February 2024	
Indoor	4 × 400 metres relay sh	3:37.63	—N/a	Virginia Beach, United States	13 January 2024	
Outdoor	4 × 100 metres relay	41.89	—N/a	Eugene, United States	13 June 2026	
Outdoor	4 × 400 metres relay	3:27.83	—N/a	Athens, United States	2 May 2026	

=== International competitions ===
Representing British Virgin Islands
Year	Competition	Venue	Position	Event	Time	Notes
2022	CARIFTA Youth Games	Kingston, Jamaica	1st	100 m	11.29	
2022	CARIFTA Youth Games	Kingston, Jamaica	1st	200 m	23.42	
2023	World Championships	Budapest, Hungary	20th (sf)	200 m	22.96	
2024	Olympic Games	Paris, France	17th (sf)	200 m	22.70	
2024	World U20 Championships	Lima, Peru	—	100 m	DQ	40.1
2024	World U20 Championships	Lima, Peru	—	200 m	DQ	40.1
2026	Commonwealth Games	Glasgow, United Kingdom	1st	200 m	22.07	

Olympic Games
Preceded by Kyron McMaster; Elinah Phillip	Flagbearer for British Virgin Islands; Paris 2024 with Thad Lettsome	Succeeded by Incumbent
