= Rikkoi Brathwaite =

British Virgin Island athlete (born 1999)

Personal information
- Nationality: British Virgin Islands
- Born: 13 February 1999 (age 27) British Virgin Islands

Sport
- Sport: Athletics
- Event: Sprint

Achievements and titles
- Personal bests: 60 m: 6.52 (Birmingham, Alabama, 2022) NR; 100 m: 10.00 (Gainesville, 2024) NR; 200 m: 20.81 (Fort-de-France, 2024)
Medal record
Men's athletics
Representing British Virgin Islands
NACAC Championships
Bronze medal – third place	2025 Freeport	100 m
Central American and Caribbean Games
Bronze medal – third place	2023 San Salvador	100 m

Rikkoi Brathwaite, OLY (born 13 February 1999) is a sprinter from the British Virgin Islands. He is two-time national champion and the national record holder over 100 metres.

== Biography ==
From Tortola, Brathwaite is a CARIFTA Games 2018 bronze medalist (under 20 boys) in the 100 metre event, captured whilst attending IMG academy in Bradenton, Florida. At university, he ran for Indiana University Bloomington. He finished third at the 2021 NCAA Indoor Championships over 60 metres which was held in Fayetteville, Arkansas, with a time of 6.56 seconds. The following year he finished second at the 2022 NCAA Indoor Championships, over 60 metres in Birmingham, Alabama running a personal best time of 6.52 seconds.

He is a two-time First Team All-American and repeat Big Ten Champion in the 60 metres. He was named the 2021 Big Ten Indoor Track Athlete of the Year and earned All-Big Ten First Team honours.

In 2022, he finished fifth in the 100 metres at the NACAC Championships in Freeport, Bahamas.

He set a new British Virgin Islands national record of 10.09 seconds for the 100 metres in early August 2023 in Tennessee. He competed at the 2023 World Athletics Championships in Budapest where he ran 10.18 seconds for the 100 metres and missed qualifying from the heats to the semifinals as a fastest loser by 0.02 seconds.

He reached the semi-finals of the 60 metres at the 2024 World Athletics Indoor Championships in Glasgow in March 2024.

He lowered his 100 metres personal best in Clermont, Florida to 10.03 seconds in April 2024. He made his Diamond League debut at the 2024 Prefontaine Classic in the 100 metres in Eugene, Oregon, finishing sixth in 10.19 seconds. He lowered his 100 metres personal best again in Gainesville, Florida to 10.0 seconds in July 2024.

Brathwaite qualified for the 2024 Olympic Games in Paris, France in the 100 metres where he made it to the semi-finals.

He was a bronze medalist in the 100 metres at the 2025 NACAC Championships in Freeport, The Bahamas in 10.15 seconds (+0.4). In September 2025, he competed in the 100 metres at the 2025 World Championships in Tokyo, Japan.

In July 2026, he competed in the 100 metres at the 2026 Commonwealth Games in Glasgow, Scotland, without advancing to the semi-finals.
