= Greg Rhymer =

Personal information
- Full name: Norbert Gregory "Greg" Rhymer
- Nationality: British Virgin Islands; United States
- Born: 22 February 1972 (age 54) New York City, United States

Sport
- Sport: Athletics
Medal record
Men's athletics
Representing the Eastern Michigan Eagles
NCAA Division I Indoor Championships
Gold medal – first place	1993 Indianapolis	4 × 800 meter relay

Norbert Gregory "Greg" Rhymer (born 22 February 1972) is a British Virgin Islander and American sprinter and middle-distance runner. Born in New York City, he was part of the Eastern Michigan Eagles. As part of the track team, he had won the men's 4 × 800 meter relay at the 1993 NCAA Division I Indoor Track and Field Championships.

Rhymer was then selected to compete for British Virgin Islands at the 1996 Summer Olympics. He raced in the men's 800 metres and was part of the men's 4 × 400 metres relay team, though did not advance to the semifinals of either event.

== Biography ==
Norbert Gregory "Greg" Rhymer was born on 22 February 1971 in New York City, United States. He studied at Eastern Michigan University in Ypsilanti, Michigan, and was part of the Eastern Michigan Eagles track team. Running for the team, Rhymer and his teammates won the 1993 4 × 800 meter relay at the NCAA Division I Indoor Track and Field Championships in a time of 7:19.13.

While part of the track team, Rhymer had set two British Virgin Islands national records in 1994 in the men's 800 metres and 1500 metres. He broke the national record in the latter on 21 May with a time of 3:46.47 at the 1994 Men's Track Mid-American Conference Meet. Four days later, he set the national record in the former with a time of 1:46.98 at the College Track Last Chance Invitational held in Eastern Michigan University.

He was eventually entered to compete for the British Virgin Islands at the 1996 Summer Olympics in Atlanta, United States. Rhymer first competed in the heats of the men's 800 metres on 28 July. He ran against six other competitors and placed last in his heat with a time of 1:50.03, not advancing to the semifinals. He was then part of the men's 4 × 400 metres relay team for the territory, competing in the heats on 2 August. Against six other teams, the team placed sixth with a time of 3:17.30.
