= Peter Crook (skier) =

British Virgin Islander freestyle skier

Personal information
- Born: 9 January 1993 (age 33) Tortola, British Virgin Islands
Medal record
Alpine skiing
Representing British Virgin Islands

Peter Crook (born 9 January 1993 in Tortola, British Virgin Islands) is a British Virgin Islander freestyle skier who has competed since 2009 in the halfpipe discipline. Crook has qualified to compete for the British Virgin Islands at the 2014 Winter Olympics in Sochi, becoming the second ever Winter Olympian to represent the country.

Crook and his family moved to Wisconsin, United States in 2001, where he picked up skiing. In 2008, he moved to Colorado and became a professional freestyle skier.

== Achievements ==
In 2011, continuing his work as an innovator and role model, Crook helped form the BVI Ski Association, giving him the opportunity to compete in FIS regulated events to represent the BVI. Crook proudly represented the BVI in half-pipe skiing at the 2014 Sochi Winter Olympic Games as flag bearer and the sole BVI Olympian. He currently ranks 27th in Halfpipe-skiing by the Association of Freeski Professionals.

== See also ==
- British Virgin Islands at the 2014 Winter Olympics

Olympic Games
Preceded by Tahesia Harrigan	Flagbearer for British Virgin Islands; Sochi 2014	Succeeded by Ashley Kelly
