= Matthew Arneborg =

British Virgin Islands windsurfer (born 1970)

Matthew Arneborg (born July 15, 1970, in Road Town, Tortola, British Virgin Islands) is a windsurfer who competed in the Summer Olympics for the British Virgin Islands.

Arneborg was just seventeen years old when he competed in the windsurfing class at the 1988 Summer Olympics, after seven races he finished 29th out of 45 starters.
