= Jerry Molyneaux =

Jerry Molyneaux (born 13 April 1958) is an athlete who represented the British Virgin Islands.

Molyneaux was part of the first ever team to represent British Virgin Islands at the Summer Olympics when he competed in the 1984 Summer Olympics, he entered the 800 metres where he finished 5th in his heat so didn't qualify for the next round, he also entered the 4x400 metres relay and finished 6th in the heat so again didn't qualify for the next round.
