= Ralston Varlack =

British Virgin Islands sprinter (born 1974)

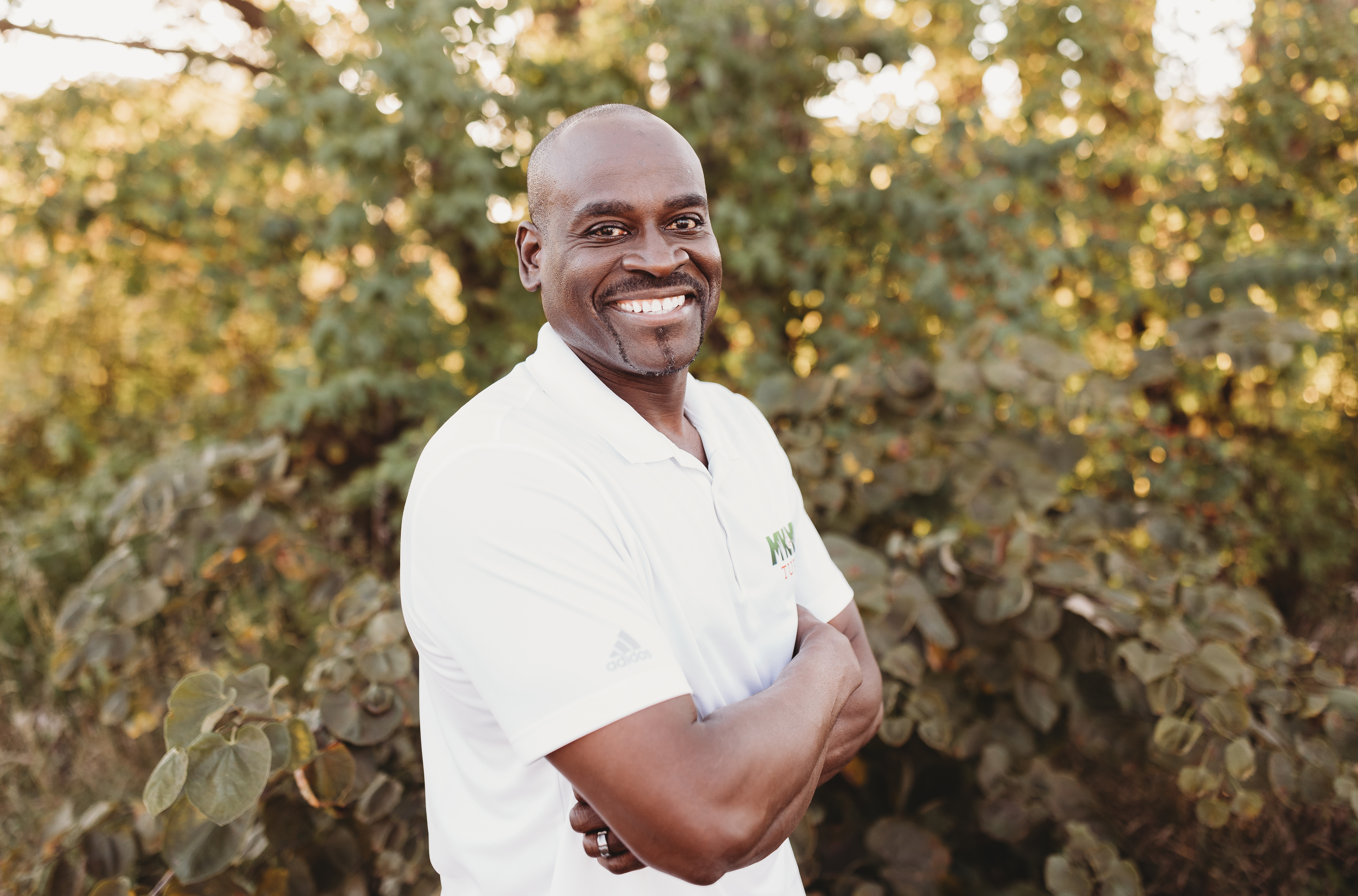
Ralston Varlack

Ralston Varlack (born 14 July 1974 in Road Town, Tortola) is a sprinter who represented the British Virgin Islands.

Varlack represented British Virgin Islands at the Summer Olympics when he competed in the 1996 Summer Olympics in Atlanta, he entered the 4x100 metres relay and the 4x400 metres relay the team finished 7th and 6th in there heats respectively so didn't qualify for the next round.
