= J'maal Alexander =

British Virgin Islands sprinter

J'maal Alexander (born 26 October 1993 in Tortola, British Virgin Islands) is a runner from the British Virgin Islands who competed at the 2012 Summer Olympics in the 100m event but was eliminated in the preliminary round.
