= John Shirley (sailor) =

British Virgin Islands sailor

John Shirley (born August 29, 1958 in Road Town, Tortola, British Virgin Islands) is a sailor who competed in the Summer Olympics for the British Virgin Islands. He is the son of the late Alexander O. Shirley, a well-known British Virgin Islands cricketer.

Shirley was a crew member of the Soling class team that competed at the 1992 Summer Olympics for the British Virgin Islands, where the team finished 17th out 24 crews.
