= Eric Matthias =

British Virgin Island discus thrower

Eric Matthias (born 13 February 1984) is an athlete from British Virgin Islands. He participated in men's discus throw at 2008 Summer Olympics. He was ranked 36 (53.11 m.).

== Achievements ==
Year	Competition	Venue	Position	Event	Notes
Representing British Virgin Islands
2002	World Junior Championships	Kingston, Jamaica	33rd (q)	Discus (1.75 kg)	44.23 m
2003	Central American and Caribbean Championships	St. George's, Grenada	5th	Discus	51.42 m
2008	Olympic Games	Beijing, PR China	37th (q)	Discus	53.11 m
