= Lindel Hodge =

British Virgin Islands sprinter

Personal information
- Born: 5 April 1959 (age 67) Road Town, Tortola, British Virgin Islands

Sport
- Sport: Track and field

Lindel Hodge (born 5 April 1959) is a sprinter from the British Virgin Islands.

Hodge was part of the first ever team to represent British Virgin Islands at the Summer Olympics when he competed in the 1984 Summer Olympics, he entered the 200 metres and in his heat he ran a time of 22.28 seconds and finished 5th out of eight runners so didn't qualify for the next round, he also entered the 4x400 metres relay they finished 6th in the heat so didn't qualify for the next round. Four years later he was at the 1988 Summer Olympics and this time he ran in the 100 metres and 200 metres in the 100 metres he ran in a time of 10.79 seconds and finished 6th in his heat and the 200 metres he finished 5th so didn't qualify for the next round in either event.

Olympic Games
Preceded by Erroll Fraser	Flagbearer for British Virgin Islands; Los Angeles 1984	Succeeded by Willis Todman
