= Ashley Kelly (sprinter) =

British Virgin Islands sprinter (born 1991)

Personal information
- Full name: Ashley Natasha Kelly
- Born: 25 March 1991 (age 35) New York City, United States
- Education: University of Illinois; University of New York
- Height: 1.73 m (5 ft 8 in)
- Weight: 75 kg (165 lb)

Sport
- Sport: Athletics
- Event(s): 200 m, 400 m

Ashley Natasha Kelly (born March 25, 1991) is a sprinter from the British Virgin Islands specializing in the 400 metres. She represented her country at the 2016 World Indoor Championships without advancing from the first round.

She represented the British Virgin Islands at the 2016 Summer Olympics in Rio de Janeiro in the 200 m event. She finished fifth in her heat with a time of 23.61 seconds and did not qualify for the semifinals. She was the flag bearer during the opening ceremony.

== Competition record ==
Year	Competition	Venue	Position	Event	Notes
Representing British Virgin Islands
2007	World Youth Championships	Ostrava, Czech Republic	41st (h)	100 m	12.48
2007	World Youth Championships	Ostrava, Czech Republic	26th (h)	200 m	25.17
2009	Central American and Caribbean Championships	Havana, Cuba	14th (h)	400 m	54.82
2009	Central American and Caribbean Championships	Havana, Cuba	5th	4 × 400 m relay	3:37.62
2010	World Junior Championships	Moncton, Canada	29th (h)	400 m	55.71
2011	Central American and Caribbean Championships	Mayagüez, Puerto Rico	6th	400 m	54.00
2012	NACAC U23 Championships	Irapuato, Mexico	5th	200 m	23.77
2012	NACAC U23 Championships	Irapuato, Mexico	5th	400 m	53.35
2013	Central American and Caribbean Championships	Morelia, Mexico	14th (h)	200 m	24.30
2013	Central American and Caribbean Championships	Morelia, Mexico	–	4 × 100 m relay	DNF
2014	IAAF World Relays	Nassau, Bahamas	7th (B)	4 × 100 m relay	45.06
2014	Commonwealth Games	Glasgow, United Kingdom	17th (sf)	400 m	24.00
2014	Commonwealth Games	Glasgow, United Kingdom	22nd (sf)	400 m	54.35
2015	NACAC Championships	San José, Costa Rica	9th (h)	200 m	23.82
2016	World Indoor Championships	Portland, United States	13th (h)	400 m	54.95
2016	Olympic Games	Rio de Janeiro, Brazil	56th (h)	200 m	23.61
2017	IAAF World Relays	Nassau, Bahamas	10th (h)	4 × 100 m relay	44.78
2017	IAAF World Relays	Nassau, Bahamas	7th	4 × 200 m relay	1:35.35
2017	World Championships	London, United Kingdom	24th (sf)	400 m	54.50
2018	Commonwealth Games	Gold Coast, Australia	14th (sf)	400 m	53.00
2018	Central American and Caribbean Games	Barranquilla, Colombia	5th	400 m	53.84
2019	Pan American Games	Lima, Peru	15th (h)	400 m	54.42

== Personal bests ==
Outdoor

- 200 metres – 23.36 (+1.8 m/s, Port of Spain 2015)
- 400 metres – 52.71 (Des Moines 2011)
- 100 metres—12.34 (-0.3 m/s, Les Abymes, 15 April 2006)
- 200 metres—23.17 (+0.3, Gainesville, FL) 31 March 2016
- 400 metres-- (52.29, Road Town [A.O.Shirley]) 3 July 2016

Indoor

- 200 metres – 23.69 (Boston 2016)
- 400 metres – 53.01 (Boston 2016)
- 300 metres—37.91 (New york (armory), NY), 24 Jan 2016

Olympic Games
Preceded by Peter Crook	Flagbearer for British Virgin Islands; Rio 2016	Succeeded by Elinah Phillip; Kyron McMaster
