= Dion Crabbe =

British Virgin Islands sprinter

Personal information
- Born: March 10, 1977 (age 49)
Medal record
Men's Athletics
Representing the British Virgin Islands
Central American and Caribbean Games
Gold medal – first place	2002 San Salvador	100 metres

Dion Kwasi Crabbe (born March 10, 1977) is a sprinter from the British Virgin Islands. He won the 100 metres race at the 2002 Central American and Caribbean Games.

Born in Tortola, Crabbe won the bronze medal over 200 metres at the 1999 Central American and Caribbean Championships. He finished sixth at the 2006 Central American and Caribbean Games.

Crabbe competed for the Central Arizona Vaqueros and for the Mississippi State Bulldogs track and field teams in the NCAA.

== Achievements ==
Year	Competition	Venue	Position	Event	Notes
Representing British Virgin Islands
2000	NACAC U-25 Championships	Monterrey, Mexico	3rd	100m	10.82 (wind: -2.5 m/s)
2000	NACAC U-25 Championships	Monterrey, Mexico	3rd	200m	21.27 (wind: -3.9 m/s)
2002	Central American and Caribbean Games	San Salvador, El Salvador	1st	100m	10.28 w (wind: 2.1 m/s)
2002	Central American and Caribbean Games	San Salvador, El Salvador	4th	200m	21.15 (wind: -0.4 m/s)

Olympic Games
Preceded by Keita Cline	Flagbearer for British Virgin Islands; Athens 2004	Succeeded by Tahesia Harrigan
