= Karl Scatliffe =

English athlete (born 1967)

Personal information
- Born: 4 May 1967 (age 59) Road Town, Tortola, British Virgin Islands

Sport
- Sport: Track and field

Karl Marcus Scatliffe (born 4 May 1967) is an athlete who represented the British Virgin Islands.

Scatliffe competed in the high jump at the 1992 Summer Olympics in Barcelona, he jumped 2.10 metres in the qualifying round and finished 21st in his pool and 39th overall so didn't qualify for the final.

Olympic Games
Preceded by Willis Todman	Flagbearer for British Virgin Islands; Barcelona 1992	Succeeded by Keita Cline
