= Dean Greenaway =

British Virgin Islands sprinter

Dean Greenaway (born 13 January 1959 in Saint Thomas, U.S. Virgin Islands) is a sprinter who represented the British Virgin Islands.

Greenaway was part of the first ever team to represent British Virgin Islands at the Summer Olympics when he competed in the 1984 Summer Olympics, he entered the 400 metres where he finished 5th in his heat so didn't qualify for the next round, he also entered the 4x400 metres relay and finished 6th in the heat so again didn't qualify for the next round.

On 19 May 1979, Greenaway ran 400m in 46.04s, setting a national record which still stands today.
