= Elinah Phillip =

British Virgin Islands swimmer (born 2000)

Personal information
- Nationality: British Virgin Islander
- Born: 3 April 2000 (age 26) Road Town

Sport
- Sport: Swimming
- College team: Florida International University (2020–present); Rutgers University (2019–2020)

Elinah Phillip (born 3 April 2000) is a British Virgin Islander swimmer. She competed in the women's 50 metre freestyle event at the 2016 Summer Olympics. The first Olympic swimmer to represent the British Virgin Islands, Phillip ranked 48th with a time of 26.26 seconds. She did not advance to the semifinals.

She also competed at the 2020 Summer Olympics, the 2015 Pan American Games, and the 2014 Commonwealth Games.

Olympic Games
Preceded by Ashley Kelly	Flagbearer for British Virgin Islands; Tokyo 2020 with Kyron McMaster	Succeeded by Adaejah Hodge; Thad Lettsome
