= Keita Cline =

British Virgin Islands sprinter

Personal information
- Born: 29 November 1974 (age 51) Saint Thomas, U.S. Virgin Islands

Sport
- Sport: Track and field
- Club: Minnesota Golden Gophers

Keita Cline (born 29 November 1974) is an athlete who represented the British Virgin Islands.

Cline competed in two Olympics in three different events, at the 1996 Summer Olympics he entered the long jump where he finished 40th and the 4 × 100 metres relay the team finished 7th in the heat so didn't qualify for the next round, four years later at the 2000 Summer Olympics he was the only competitor from his country, he entered the 200 metres and finished 7th in his heat.

Cline was an All-American jumper for the Minnesota Golden Gophers track and field team, finishing 8th in the triple jump at the 1995 NCAA Division I Indoor Track and Field Championships and 8th in the long jump at the 1995 NCAA Division I Outdoor Track and Field Championships.

Olympic Games
Preceded by Karl Scatliffe	Flagbearer for British Virgin Islands; Atlanta 1996; Sydney 2000	Succeeded by Dion Crabbe
