= Kyron McMaster =

British Virgin Islands athlete (born 1997)

Kyron McMaster OBE
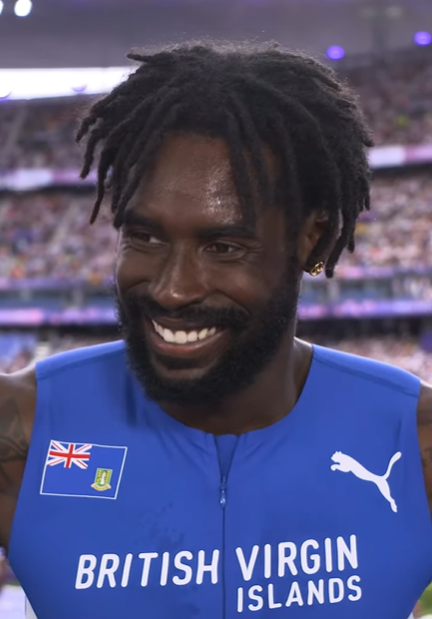
- Kyron McMaster at the 2024 Summer Olympics

Personal information
- Born: 3 January 1997 (age 29) Road Town, Tortola, British Virgin Islands
- Education: Central Arizona College; University of Florida
- Height: 1.91 m (6 ft 3 in)
- Weight: 74 kg (163 lb)

Sport
- Sport: Athletics
- Event: 400 m hurdles
- College team: Florida Gators
- Coached by: Dag Samuels (–2017); Lennox Graham (2017–)
Medal record
Men's athletics
Representing the British Virgin Islands
World Championships
Silver medal – second place	2023 Budapest	400m hurdles
Diamond League
First place	2017	400m hurdles
First place	2018	400m hurdles
Commonwealth Games
Gold medal – first place	2018 Gold Coast	400m hurdles
Gold medal – first place	2022 Birmingham	400m hurdles
NACAC Championships
Gold medal – first place	2018 Toronto	400m hurdles
Gold medal – first place	2022 Freeport	400 m hurdles
Central American and Caribbean Games
Gold medal – first place	2018 Barranquilla	400m hurdles

Kyron Anthony McMaster OBE (born 3 January 1997) is an athlete from the British Virgin Islands specialising in the 400 metres hurdles.

He represented his country at the 2017 World Championships, where he finished in the top three in his heat but was disqualified for lane infringement. Earlier, he had won a bronze medal at the 2016 World U20 Championships.

His personal best in the event is 47.08 seconds, set in finishing fourth in the final of the 2020 Olympic Games 400m hurdles, on 3 August 2021. This is the current national record.

His coach, Xavier "Dag" Samuels died on 9 September 2017 during Hurricane Irma.

McMaster won the British Virgin Islands' first ever Commonwealth Games medal (a gold) in the 400 m hurdles in 2018 and followed up with another gold at the Commonwealth Games winning at Birmingham 2022 in the same event.

McMaster finished second at the 2023 World Championships in Budapest, earning a silver medal. This was the British Virgin Islands' first ever medal at the World Championships.

He was appointed Officer of the Order of the British Empire (OBE) in the 2024 New Year Honours for services to sport in the British Virgin Islands.

== International competitions ==
Year	Competition	Venue	Position	Event	Notes
Representing British Virgin Islands
2012	Central American and Caribbean; Junior Championships (U18)	San Salvador, El Salvador	12th (h)	400 m	50.84
2012	Central American and Caribbean; Junior Championships (U18)	San Salvador, El Salvador	7th	High jump	1.85 m
2013	CARIFTA Games (U17)	Nassau, Bahamas	7th	200 m	22.36 (w)
2013	CARIFTA Games (U17)	Nassau, Bahamas	5th	400 m	49.29
2013	World Youth Championships	Donetsk, Ukraine	62nd (h)	200 m	22.55
2014	CARIFTA Games (U18)	Fort-de-France, Martinique	6th	400 m	49.10
2014	CARIFTA Games (U18)	Fort-de-France, Martinique	3rd	400 m hurdles (84 cm)	52.85
2014	World Junior Championships	Eugene, United States	43rd (h)	400 m hurdles	54.21
2014	Youth Olympic Games	Nanjing, China	–	400 m hurdles (84 cm)	DQ
2015	Pan American Junior Championships	Edmonton, Canada	1st (h)	400 m hurdles	50.16^{1}
2016	World U20 Championships	Bydgoszcz, Poland	3rd	400 m hurdles	49.56
2017	World Championships	London, United Kingdom	–	400 m hurdles	DQ
2017	IAAF Diamond League	Various venues	1st	400 m hurdles	48.07
2018	Commonwealth Games	Gold Coast, Australia	1st	400 m hurdles	48.25
2018	Central American and Caribbean Games	Barranquilla, Colombia	1st	400 m hurdles	47.60
2018	NACAC Championships	Toronto, Canada	1st	400 m hurdles	48.18
2019	World Championships	Doha, Qatar	4th	400 m hurdles	48.10
2021	Olympic Games	Tokyo, Japan	4th	400 m hurdles	47.08
2022	World Championships	Eugene, United States	20th (h)	400 m hurdles	49.98^{2}
2022	Commonwealth Games	Birmingham, England	1st	400 m hurdles	48.93
2022	NACAC Championships	Freeport, Bahamas	1st	400 m hurdles	47.34
2023	World Championships	Budapest, Hungary	2nd	400 m hurdles	47.34
2024	Olympic Games	Paris, France	5th	400 m hurdles	47.79
2025	World Championships	Tokyo, Japan	35th (h)	400 m hurdles	49.89

^{1}Did not finish in the final
^{2}Did not start in the semifinals

Olympic Games
Preceded by Ashley Kelly	Flagbearer for British Virgin Islands; Tokyo 2020 with Elinah Phillip	Succeeded by Adaejah Hodge; Thad Lettsome
