= Robert Hirst (sailor) =

British Virgin Islands sailor

- Born: August 10, 1971 (age 54); Road Town, Tortola, British Virgin Islands
- Occupation: Sailor
- Known for: Competing in summer Olympic games

Robert Hirst (born August 10, 1971 in Road Town, Tortola, British Virgin Islands) is a sailor who competed in the Summer Olympics for the British Virgin Islands.

In his first Olympics, Hirst was a crew member of the Soling team that competed at the 1992 Summer Olympics where they finished 17th out of 24 teams, four years later at the 1996 Summer Olympics he entered the laser class where finished 25th out of 56 starters.
