= Willis Todman =

Personal information
- Born: 14 January 1966 (age 60) Road Town, Tortola, British Virgin Islands

Sport
- Sport: Track and field

Willis Todman (born 14 January 1966) is a sprinter who represented the British Virgin Islands.

Todman represented British Virgin Islands at the Summer Olympics when he competed in the 1988 Summer Olympics in Seoul, he entered the 400 metres where he finished 7th in his heat so didn't qualify for the next round, eight years later he competed in Atlanta at the 1996 Summer Olympics, where in the 4×100 metres relay the team finished 7th in the heat so didn't qualify for the next round.

His younger brother Mario also competed at the 1996 Summer Olympics in the relays.

Olympic Games
Preceded by Lindel Hodge	Flagbearer for British Virgin Islands; Seoul 1988	Succeeded by Karl Scatliffe
