= Tahesia Harrigan-Scott =

British Virgin Islands sprinter (born 1982)

Tahesia Harrigan
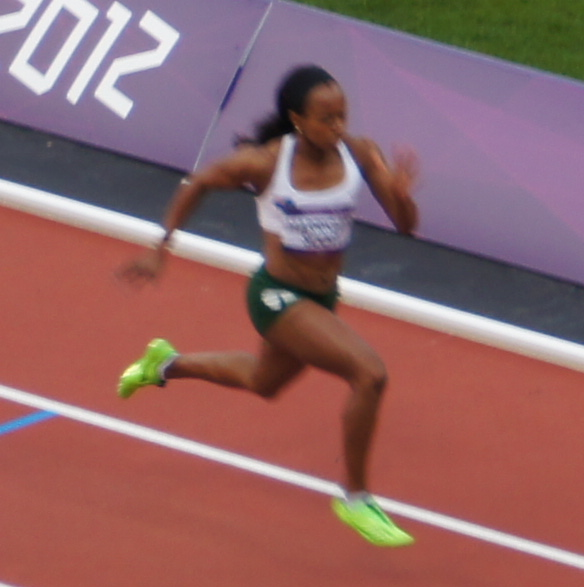
- Tahesia Harrigan-Scott at the 2012 Summer Olympics

Personal information
- Full name: Tahesia Gaynell Harrigan-Scott
- Born: 15 February 1982 (age 44) Saint Thomas, United States Virgin Islands
- Height: 1.57 m (5 ft 2 in)
- Weight: 54 kg (119 lb)

Sport
- Country: British Virgin Islands
- Sport: Athletics
- Event: Sprint
Medal record
Women's Athletics
Representing the British Virgin Islands
World Indoor Championships
Bronze medal – third place	2008 Valencia	60 metres
Central American and Caribbean Games
Gold medal – first place	2006 Cartagena	100 metres
Gold medal – first place	2010 Mayagüez	100 metres
- Updated on 28 December 2014

Tahesia Gaynell Harrigan-Scott (born 15 February 1982) is a sprinter from the British Virgin Islands. She was the first woman to represent the British Virgin Islands at the Olympics.

== Career ==
Harrigan was born in the Virgin Islands to Doris Harrigan. Harrigan's track and field career began in Tallahassee, Florida. As a 14-year-old 9th grader, she brought Florida A&M University's Developmental and Research High School female track team to its first Class 1-A Florida High School Athletic Association state track and field championship win in over ten years by sweeping the 100 metres, 200 metres, the long jump and triple jump.

Some other highlights of her prep career include 13 FHSAA State Championship Track and Field victories as an individual or part of a relay team in high school ( 8 of those victories being going undefeated all four years in the 100 and 200 metres, 3 in the long jump, 2 in the triple jump,).

After graduating from high school as salutatorian in the spring of 2000, she was approached by several reputable Florida collegiate track and field programs, but chose the University of Minnesota for its medical program. She red shirted her first year due to a fractured tibia, Harrigan entered the university's conference scene setting school and conference records in the women's 60 m, 100 m, 200 m, and the long jump in 2002. She went on that year to compete as a representative of her country (BVI) in the Central American and Caribbean Games.

In 2004, Harrigan transferred to the University of Alabama where she honed her athletic prowess even further becoming a SEC powerhouse and an NCAA finalist. She earned a bachelor's degree in psychology in 2005 and a Masters in Speech Pathology in 2007 from Alabama. She was an All American at the University of Alabama and the University of Minnesota. She won the 100 metres race at the 2006 Central American and Caribbean Games, and finished fifth at the 2006 Commonwealth Games. The OECS sports desk named her most outstanding female athlete in 2006 for her top performances in international meets.

Harrigan began her career as a professional sprinter in the spring of 2007. She has competed in several professional track meets in the US and abroad. Her current personal record in the 100 metres is 11.13 seconds.

At the 2008 IAAF World Indoor Championships in Valencia, Spain, Harrigan finished third in the final of the Women's 60m posting a new BVI national record of 7.09 sec. At the 2008 Summer Olympics in Beijing she competed at the 100 metres sprint. In her first round heat she placed third behind Christine Arron and Lauryn Williams in a time of 11.46 to advance to the second round. There she failed to qualify for the semi-finals as her time of 11.36 was only the fifth time of her heat, causing elimination.

Harrigan-Scott tested positive for the stimulant methylhexaneamine in 2011, and was subsequently handed a 6-month ban from sports.

== Personal bests ==
Event	Result	Venue	Date
Outdoor
100 m	11.12 s (wind: +1.6 m/s)	Miramar, United States	11 June 2011
200 m	22.98 s (wind: +0.9 m/s)	Donnas, Italy	15 July 2007
400 m	54.06 s	Coral Gables, United States	29 March 2014
Long jump	6.06 m (wind: +1.8 m/s)	Walnut, United States	16 April 2005
Indoor
60 m	7.09 s	Valencia, Spain	7 March 2008
200 m	24.10 s	State College, United States	24 February 2002
400 m	57.88 s	Minneapolis, United States	20 January 2001
Long jump	6.17 m	Gainesville, United States	24 February 2006
Triple jump	11.93 m	Clemson, United States	21 January 2006

== Achievements ==
Year	Competition	Venue	Position	Event	Notes
Representing the British Virgin Islands
1998	Central American and Caribbean; Junior Championships (U17)	George Town, Cayman Islands	5th	100 m	12.22 w (wind: +2.4 m/s)
1998	Central American and Caribbean; Junior Championships (U17)	George Town, Cayman Islands	5th	200 m	25.35 (wind: 0.0 m/s)
1999	Pan American Junior Championships	Tampa, United States	6th	100 m	11.96 (wind: 0.0 m/s)
1999	Pan American Junior Championships	Tampa, United States	5th (h)	200 m	25.08 (wind: -0.9 m/s)
1999	Pan American Junior Championships	Tampa, United States	8th	Long jump	5.54 m (wind: NWI)
2002	Commonwealth Games	Manchester, United Kingdom	15th (sf)	100m	11.62 (wind: +0.3 m/s)
2005	Central American and Caribbean Championships	Nassau, Bahamas	2nd	100 m	11.29 (wind: +1.1 m/s)
2005	World Championships	Helsinki, Finland	19th (qf)	100 m	11.47 (wind: -0.8 m/s)
2006	Commonwealth Games	Melbourne, Australia	5th	100 m	11.48 (wind: +0.2 m/s)
2006	Central American and Caribbean Games	Cartagena, Colombia	1st	100 m	11.15 w (wind: +0.5 m/s)
2007	Pan American Games	Rio de Janeiro, Brazil	4th	100 m	11.34 (wind: +0.8 m/s)
2007	World Championships	Osaka, Japan	6th (qf)	100 m	11.33 (wind: -0.2 m/s)
2007	World Championships	Osaka, Japan	6th (qf)	200 m	23.52 (wind: +0.7 m/s)
2008	World Indoor Championships	Valencia, Spain	3rd	60 m	7.09
2008	Olympic Games	Beijing, China	16th (qf)	100 m	11.36 (wind: +0.4 m/s)
2009	Central American and Caribbean Championships	Havana, Cuba	1st	100 m	11.21 (wind: +0.8 m/s)
2009	World Championships	Berlin, Germany	7th (sf)	100 m	11.34 (wind: -0.1 m/s)
2010	World Indoor Championships	Doha, Qatar	6th	60 m	7.17
2010	Central American and Caribbean Games	Mayagüez, Puerto Rico	1st	100 m	11.19 (wind: 0.0 m/s)
2010	Commonwealth Games	Delhi, India	5th	100 m	11.56 (wind: +0.2 m/s)
2012	Olympic Games	London, United Kingdom	7th (h)	100 m	11.59 (wind: +0.4 m/s)
2013	World Championships	Moscow, Russia	31st (h)	100 m	11.61 (wind: -0.4 m/s)
2014	World Indoor Championships	Sopot, Poland	8th (sf)	60 m	7.17
2014	Central American and Caribbean Games	Xalapa, Mexico	8th	100m	11.93 A (wind: +1.5 m/s)
2015	NACAC Championships	San José, Costa Rica	4th	100m	11.28 (wind: -0.1 m/s)
2015	World Championships	Beijing, China	33rd (h)	100 m	11.47
2016	World Indoor Championships	Portland, United States	15th (sf)	60 m	7.23
2016	Olympic Games	Rio de Janeiro, Brazil	37th (h)	100 m	11.54
2017	IAAF World Relays	Nassau, Bahamas	10th (h)	4 × 100 m relay	44.78
2017	IAAF World Relays	Nassau, Bahamas	7th	4 × 200 m relay	1:35.35
2018	World Indoor Championships	Birmingham, United Kingdom	39th (h)	60 m	7.50
2018	Commonwealth Games	Gold Coast, Australia	13th (sf)	100 m	11.63
2018	Central American and Caribbean Games	Barranquilla, Colombia	7th	100 m	11.69
2018	NACAC Championships	Toronto, Canada	7th	100 m	11.61

Olympic Games
Preceded by Dion Crabbe	Flagbearer for British Virgin Islands; Beijing 2008; London 2012	Succeeded by Peter Crook
