= British Virgin Islands Olympic Committee =

National Olympic Committee

- Country: British Virgin Islands
- Code: IVB
- Created: 1980
- Recognized: 1982
- Continental Association: PASO
- President: Ephraim Penn
- Secretary General: Dean Greenaway
- Website: bviolympics.org

The British Virgin Islands Olympic Committee (IOC code: IVB) is the National Olympic Committee representing the British Virgin Islands. They organise the British Virgin Islands' participation in the Olympic Games. It is also the body responsible for the British Virgin Islands's representation at the Commonwealth Games.

== History ==
The British Virgin Islands Olympic Committee had its origins with the foundation of the British Virgin Islands Athletics Association in 1970 founded by Rey O'Neal. The BVI Olympic Committee was founded in 1980 by O'Neal after the British Virgin Islands were regularly excluded from multi-sport events due to the lack of a formally recognised National Olympic Committee. It gained International Olympic Committee recognition in 1982.

This followed on from fellow British Overseas Territories of Bermuda and the Cayman Islands in having their own National Olympic Committees. Despite an amendment to the Olympic charter in 1996 to limit IOC membership to only independent states, the British Virgin Islands retained their membership due to having been a member prior to the amendment. The British Virgin Islands made their Olympic debut at the 1984 Summer Olympics in Los Angeles, United States. They are also responsible for organising the British Virgin Islands at the Commonwealth Games.

Originally, the BVI Olympic committee used the British national anthem "God Save the Queen" as their podium anthem, however in 2021, they changed this to use the BVI's territorial song "Oh, Beautiful Virgin Islands" instead.

== See also ==
- British Virgin Islands at the Olympics
- British Virgin Islands at the Commonwealth Games
- Sport in the British Virgin Islands
- British Virgin Islands Athletics Association
- British Virgin Islands Football Association
