= Flag of the British Virgin Islands =

British overseas territory flag

Flag of the Virgin Islands
- Flag of the Virgin Islands
- Use: Civil and state flag, state ensign
- Proportion: 1:2
- Adopted: 15 November 1960 (modified coat of arms on 25 January 1999)
- Design: A blue ensign with the Union flag in the top left hand corner and the coat of arms centre-right.

The flag of the British Virgin Islands was adopted by Royal Warrant on 15 November 1960 after the islands were made into a separate British colony. Previously, the territory was administered as part of the British Leeward Islands.

== Description ==
Flag of the British Virgin Islands (1960–1999)

The flag of the Virgin Islands features a defaced Blue Ensign with the Union Flag in the canton, and defaced with the coat of arms of the British Virgin Islands. The coat of arms, which date to the early nineteenth century, features Saint Ursula holding a flaming gold oil lamp and surrounded by a further eleven lamps, which represent her 11,000 virgin followers. The islands were named after these virgin followers by Christopher Columbus when he arrived at the islands in 1493, the multiplicity of islands reminding him of the numerous followers. The motto present on the flag reads Vigilate, which translated from Latin is be watchful. The flag was modified in 1999, when the shield was enlarged and outlined in white.

== Etiquette ==
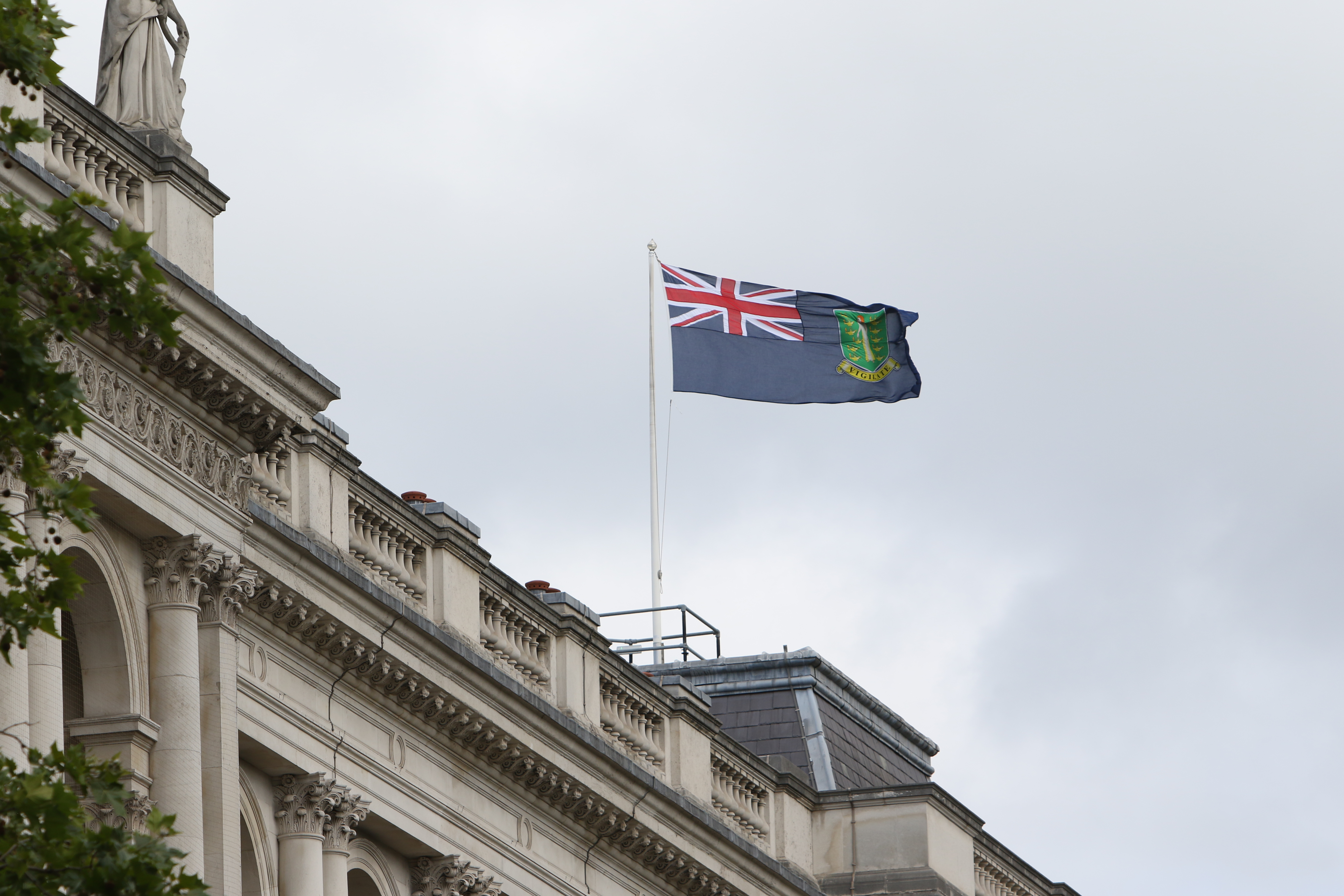
Flag flying over the Foreign and Commonwealth Office in London, 2019

The flag of the Virgin Islands must never be flown above another flag, indicating superiority, or vice versa, indicating inferiority, nor should it be allowed to drag along the ground. The flag must always be flown in good condition, to do otherwise would be to show disrespect to the nation. Due care must be taken to ensure the flag is being flown the correct way up. The flag is flown from sunrise to sunset and all government buildings are encouraged to fly it. When a flag is to be disposed of, it must be destroyed in a dignified way, preferably by burning in private with respect.

== Related flags ==
Civil ensign of the British Virgin Islands

Flag of the governor of the British Virgin Islands

=== Civil ensign ===
The civil ensign is a Red Ensign with the coat of arms of the British Virgin Islands. The Red Ensign is to be flown on board vessels either registered in the Virgin Islands or by vessels visiting the Virgin Islands. The flag was authorised in 2001 and Section 70 of the British Virgin Islands Merchant Shipping Act, 2001 reads:

1. The red ensign bearing the Virgin Islands’ coat of arms usually worn by merchant ships, or without the coat of arms, is hereby declared to be the proper national colours for all Virgin Islands ships, except in the case of His Majesty's ships, or in the case of any other ship for the time being allowed to wear any other national colours in pursuance of a warrant from His Majesty or from the Admiralty.
2. If any distinctive national colours, except the red ensign or the Union Jack with a white border or any colours usually worn by His Majesty's ships or resembling those of His Majesty, or the pendant usually carried by His Majesty's ships or any pendant resembling that pendant, are or is hoisted on board any Virgin Islands ship without warrant from His Majesty or from the Admiralty, the master of the ship, the owner if on board the ship, and every other person hoisting the colours or pendant, each commits an offence and for each such offence is liable on summary conviction to a fine not exceeding twenty-five thousand dollars.

The blue ensign shall only be used on vessels which belong to or are in the service of the government.

=== Gubernatorial flag ===
The Governor of the British Virgin Islands has a separate flag (also seen below), a Union Flag defaced with the coat of arms. This design is similar to flags of the other Governors in British overseas territories. The gubernatorial flag is for use at Government House when the governor is in residence or within the territory. It is also on the bonnet of the motor-car in which the governor travels on official business. The current governor, in office since 29 January 2024, is Daniel Pruce.
