= 2009 World Championships in Athletics – Women's long jump =

The women's long jump at the 2009 World Championships in Athletics was held at the Olympic Stadium on 21 and 23 August.

In the final, Olympic champion Maurren Higa Maggi took the early lead as the first jumper in the competition. After three fouls, the second legal jump of the competition took Brittney Reese into the lead with a 6.92m. Tatyana Lebedeva's second round 6.97m put her into the lead for six jumps until Reese could take her third jump. Her season best tying 7.10 m (23 ft 3 1/2 in) settled the competition. No athlete improved over the final three rounds.

In 2017, silver medalist Lebedeva's 2008 Olympic doping sample was retested and found positive for dehydrochlormethyltestosterone (turinabol). Her Olympic medal was revoked. Ordinarily, a doping violation is followed by a two year ban which would include this championship. No changes in medals have been announced yet.

== Medalists ==
Gold	Brittney Reese; United States (USA)
Silver	Karin Melis Mey; Turkey (TUR)
Bronze	Naide Gomes; Portugal (POR)

== Records ==
Prior to the competition, the following records were as follows.

World record	Galina Chistyakova (URS)	7.52	Leningrad, Soviet Union	11 June 1988
Championship record	Jackie Joyner-Kersee (USA)	7.36	Rome, Italy	4 September 1987
World leading	Brittney Reese (USA)	7.06	Belém, Brazil	24 May 2009
African record	Chioma Ajunwa (NGR)	7.12	Atlanta, United States	2 August 1996
Asian Record	Yao Weili (CHN)	7.01	Jinan, China	5 June 1993
North American record	Jackie Joyner-Kersee (USA)	7.49	New York, United States	22 May 1994
South American record	Maurren Maggi (BRA)	7.26	Bogotá, Colombia	26 June 1999
European record	Galina Chistyakova (URS)	7.52	Leningrad, Soviet Union	11 June 1988
Oceanian record	Bronwyn Thompson (AUS)	7.00	Melbourne, Australia	7 March 2002

No new records were set during this competition.

== Qualification standards ==
A standard	B standard
6.72m	6.62m

== Schedule ==
Date	Time	Round
21 August 2009	18:00	Qualification
23 August 2009	16:15	Final

== Results ==
=== Qualification ===
Qualification: Qualifying Performance 6.75 (Q) or at least 12 best performers (q) advance to the final.

Rank	Group	Athlete	Nationality	#1	#2	#3	Result	Notes
1	A	Naide Gomes	Portugal	6.60	6.86		6.86	Q
2	B	Brittney Reese	United States	6.78			6.78	Q
3	B	Tatyana Lebedeva	Russia	6.76			6.76	Q
4	B	Olga Kucherenko	Russia	6.68	6.65	-	6.68	q
5	A	Maurren Maggi	Brazil	6.68	6.58	6.30	6.68	q
6	B	Karin Melis Mey	Turkey	6.57	6.61	6.67	6.67	q
7	B	Keila Costa	Brazil	6.66	x	6.55	6.66	q
8	B	Ksenija Balta	Estonia	x	6.23	6.59	6.59	q
9	A	Nastassia Mironchyk	Belarus	6.08	6.55	6.42	6.55	q
10	A	Teresa Dobija	Poland	6.55	x	x	6.55	q
11	A	Brianna Glenn	United States	x	x	6.53	6.53	q
12	A	Shara Proctor	Anguilla	6.43	6.52	6.47	6.52	q
13	A	Yelena Sokolova	Russia	6.44	6.51	6.46	6.51	
14	A	Jung Soon-Ok	South Korea	6.45	6.31	6.49	6.49	
15	A	Ruky Abdulai	Canada	6.37	6.45	x	6.45	
16	B	Jovanee Jarrett	Jamaica	6.29	6.42	6.43	6.43	
17	B	Viktoriya Rybalko	Ukraine	6.40	6.18	x	6.40	
18	B	Éloyse Lesueur	France	6.40	6.09	6.11	6.40	
19	A	Irina Meleshina	Russia	6.39	6.14	x	6.39	
20	B	Nataliya Dobrynska	Ukraine	6.32	6.38	6.36	6.38	
21	A	Funmi Jimoh	United States	x	x	6.34	6.34	
22	B	Yarianny Argüelles	Cuba	6.15	5.97	6.32	6.32	
23	B	Melanie Bauschke	Germany	6.32	6.13	6.14	6.32	
24	B	Margrethe Renstrøm	Norway	6.31	x	6.10	6.31	
25	A	Bianca Kappler	Germany	6.26	6.21	6.29	6.29	
26	A	Viktoriya Molchanova	Ukraine	6.29	6.20	x	6.29	
27	A	Ola Sesay	Sierra Leone	5.92	6.23	6.19	6.23	
28	A	Sachiko Masumi	Japan	6.23	6.06	6.13	6.23	
29	B	Marestella Torres	Philippines	6.21	6.03	6.22	6.22	
30	B	Janice Josephs	South Africa	6.22	5.75	x	6.22	
31	B	Beatrice Marscheck	Germany	6.07	x	6.19	6.19	
32	A	Jana Velďáková	Slovakia	x	6.16	x	6.16	
33	A	Sirkka-Liisa Kivine	Estonia	x	5.92	6.10	6.10	
34	B	Alice Falaiye	Canada	6.07	6.09	x	6.09	
35	A	Nina Kolarič	Slovenia	x	x	6.00	6.00	
36	B	Patricia Sylvester	Grenada	5.92	5.80	x	5.92	
—N/a	B	Blessing Okagbare	Nigeria				DNS	

Key: DNS = Did not start, Q = qualification by place in heat, q = qualification by overall place

=== Final ===
Rank	Athlete	Nationality	#1	#2	#3	#4	#5	#6	Result	Notes
1st place, gold medalist(s)	Brittney Reese	United States	6.92	6.85	7.10	x	x	x	7.10	WL
2nd place, silver medalist(s)	Tatyana Lebedeva	Russia	6.78	6.97	x	x	x	x	6.97	SB
3rd place, bronze medalist(s)	Karin Melis Mey	Turkey	6.76	x	6.80	x	x	6.49	6.80	
4	Naide Gomes	Portugal	6.77	x	6.52	6.68	6.69	6.68	6.77	
5	Olga Kucherenko	Russia	x	x	6.77	6.63	x	6.68	6.77	
6	Shara Proctor	Anguilla	x	6.56	6.71	x	x	6.40	6.71	NR
7	Maurren Higa Maggi	Brazil	6.68	x	x	6.64	-	-	6.68	
8	Ksenija Balta	Estonia	6.62	6.52	x	6.15	6.60	6.57	6.62	
9	Brianna Glenn	United States	x	6.59	x				6.59	
10	Teresa Dobija	Poland	x	6.58	6.51				6.58	
11	Nastassia Mironchyk	Belarus	x	6.24	6.29				6.29	
—N/a	Keila Costa	Brazil	x	x	x				NM	

Key: NR = National record, SB = Seasonal best, WL = World leading (in a given season)
