= Anguilla at the World Athletics Championships =

- WA code: AIA
- National federation: Anguilla Amateur Athletic Federation
- Website: trackandfieldaxa.wordpress.com
- Medals: Gold 0 Silver 0 Bronze 0 Total 0

World Athletics Championships appearances (overview)
- 1983; 1987; 1991; 1993; 1995; 1997; 1999; 2001; 2003; 2005; 2007; 2009; 2011; 2013; 2015; 2017; 2019; 2022; 2023; 2025

Anguilla has competed at the World Athletics Championships on seventeen occasions, attending every edition since the 1983 World Championships in Athletics. Its competing country code is AIA. The territory has not won any medals at the competition. Its best performance is by Shara Proctor, who placed fifth in the women's long jump at the 2009 World Championships in Athletics. Proctor later won a World Championships silver medal while competing for Great Britain.

Anguilla is not recognised by the International Olympic Committee as a nation. This has led to its more successful athletes competing for Great Britain and Northern Ireland, as residents of a British Overseas Territories, for example Zharnel Hughes, is eligible to compete for the Great Britain Olympic team and, following in the footsteps of fellow Anguillian Shara Proctor, he ultimately confirmed in June 2015 that he would represent Great Britain in all IAAF events. Hughes said "I have always known that if I was to run at the Olympics it would be in a British vest and that is how I have always dreamt it would be."

== 2019 ==
Anguilla will compete at the 2019 World Championships in Athletics in Doha, Qatar, from 27 September to 6 October 2019. Anguilla will be represented by 1 athletes.

Athlete	Event	Preliminary		Heat		Semifinal		Final	
Athlete	Event	Result	Rank	Result	Rank	Result	Rank	Result	Rank
Saymon Rijo Morris	100 metres	11.11 PB	17	Did not advance					
