= Anguilla at the Commonwealth Games =

- CGF code: AIA (ANG used at these Games)
- CGA: Anguilla Commonwealth Games Association
- Website: anguillacommonwealthgames.com
- Medals: Gold 0 Silver 0 Bronze 0 Total 0

Commonwealth Games appearances (overview)
- 1998; 2002; 2006; 2010; 2014; 2018; 2022; 2026; 2030

Other related appearances
- Saint Christopher-Nevis-Anguilla (1978)

Anguilla, which is a British overseas territory in the Caribbean, has competed at seven Commonwealth Games to date, beginning in 1998.

== Medal tally ==
	(gold)	(silver)	(bronze)	Total
Anguilla	0	0	0	0

Anguilla is unranked on the all-time medal tally of the Commonwealth Games, having never won a medal.

== 2014 ==
Anguilla competed in the 2014 Commonwealth Games in Glasgow, Scotland from 23 July to 3 August 2014. On 30 June 2014, Anguilla's final squad of 12 athletes in 2 sports was named.

=== Athletics ===
A team of 7 athletes were named to the final squad.

Men

Athlete	Event	Heat		Semifinal		Final	
Athlete	Event	Result	Rank	Result	Rank	Result	Rank
Shanoi Richardson	100 m	11.56 SB	=70	did not advance			
Shanoi Richardson	200 m	DNS		did not advance			
Kieron Rogers	100 m	11.11	61	did not advance			
Akeame Mussington	400 m	51.50	45	did not advance			

Women
Field events

Athlete	Event	Qualification		Final	
Athlete	Event	Distance	Position	Distance	Position
Shinelle Proctor	High jump	1.71	=21	did not advance	
Rechelle Meade	Long jump	5.75 =PB	22	did not advance	

Combined events – Heptathlon

Athlete	Event	100H	HJ	SP	200 m	LJ	JT	800 m	Final	Rank
Dee-Ann Kentish-Rogers	Result	15.49	1.57 SB	9.27 PB	26.44 SB	5.15 SB	21.25	DNF	11	3633
Dee-Ann Kentish-Rogers	Points	778	701	482	759	601	312	0	11	3633

Key

- Note–Ranks given for track events are within the athlete's heat only
- Q = Qualified for the next round
- q = Qualified for the next round as a fastest loser or, in field events, by position without achieving the qualifying target
- NR = National record
- N/A = Round not applicable for the event
- Bye = Athlete not required to compete in round

=== Road Cycling ===
A team of 5 men were named to the final squad.

Athlete	Event	Time	Rank
Benjamin Phillip	Road race	DNF	
Justin Hodge	Road race	DNF	
Danny Laud	Road race	DNF	
Danny Laud	Time trial	59:50.44	40
Kris Pradel	Road race	DNF	
Kris Pradel	Time trial	1:03:19.89	51
Sherwin Osborne	Road race	DNF	
Sherwin Osborne	Time trial	1:03:34.60	52

== History ==
Anguilla first participated in the 1998 Games, held at Kuala Lumpur, Malaysia.
