= Anguilla at the 2022 World Athletics Championships =

- Flag of Anguilla
- WA code: AIA
- National federation: Anguilla Amateur Athletic Federation

in Eugene, United States 15–24 July 2022
- Competitors: 1 (1 man)
- Medals: Gold 0 Silver 0 Bronze 0 Total 0

World Athletics Championships appearances (overview)
- 1983; 1987; 1991; 1993; 1995; 1997; 1999; 2001; 2003; 2005; 2007; 2009; 2011; 2013; 2015; 2017; 2019; 2022; 2023; 2025

Anguilla competed at the 2022 World Athletics Championships in Eugene, Oregon, United States, which were held from 15 to 24 July 2022. The athlete delegation of the country was composed of one competitor, sprinter Aiden Hazzard. Hazzard competed in the men's 400 metres and failed to make it past the qualifying heats, placing last with the slowest time out of all of the athletes that competed.

== Background ==
The 2022 World Athletics Championships in Eugene, Oregon, United States, were held from 15 to 24 July 2022. To qualify for the World Championships, athletes had to reach an entry standard (e.g. time and distance), place in a specific position at select competitions, be a wild card entry, or qualify through their World Athletics Ranking at the end of the qualification period.

As Anguilla did not meet any of the four standards, they could send either one male or one female athlete in one event of the Championships who has not yet qualified. The Anguilla Amateur Athletic Federation selected sprinter Aiden Hazzard who held a personal best of 49.02 seconds in the men's 400 metres, his entered event. These World Championships was his first athletics competition since 2019. This was Hazzard's first World Championships appearance for Anguilla.

== Results ==
Hazzard competed in the qualifying heats of the men's 400 metres on 17 July 2022 in the sixth heat against six other competitors. There, he recorded a time of 51.44 seconds for a season's best and placed last, failing to advance further as the first three athletes of each heat and the next six fastest athletes would only be able to do so. His time was the slowest amongst the competitors in the heats of the event.

Track and road events

| Athlete | Event | Heat | | Semi-final | | Final | |
| Athlete | Event | Result | Rank | Result | Rank | Result | Rank |
|---|---|---|---|---|---|---|---|
| Aiden Hazzard | Men's 400 metres | 51.44 SB | 40 | Did not advance | | | |
