= Anguilla at the 2018 Commonwealth Games =

- CG code: AIA
- CGA: Commonwealth Games Association of Anguilla
- Website: anguillacommonwealthgames.com

in Gold Coast, Australia 4 April 2018 – 15 April 2018
- Competitors: 12 in 3 sports
- Medals: Gold 0 Silver 0 Bronze 0 Total 0

Commonwealth Games appearances (overview)
- 1998; 2002; 2006; 2010; 2014; 2018; 2022; 2026; 2030

Other related appearances
- Saint Christopher-Nevis-Anguilla (1978)

Anguilla competed at the 2018 Commonwealth Games in the Gold Coast, Australia from April 4 to April 15, 2018. It was Anguilla's 6th appearance at the Commonwealth Games.

The Anguillan team consisted of 12 athletes competed in three sports: athletics, boxing and road cycling. The Anguillan team also consisted of seven officials. The appearance in boxing marked the Commonwealth Games debut for the country in the sport.

== Competitors ==
The following is the list of number of competitors participating at the Games per sport/discipline.

Sport	Men	Women	Total
Athletics (track and field)	2	3	5
Boxing	2	0	2
Cycling	5	0	5
Total	9	3	12

== Athletics (track and field) ==
Anguilla's track and field team consisted of five athletes (two male and three female).

Track & road events

Athlete	Event	Heat		Semifinal		Final	
Athlete	Event	Result	Rank	Result	Rank	Result	Rank
Mauriel Carty	Men's 200 m	Did not finish		Did not advance			
Saymon Rijo Morris	Men's 200 m	23.17	8	Did not advance			
Rechelle Meade	Women's 100 m	12.53	7	did not advance			
T-Kailah Richardson	Women's 200 m	25.61	6	Did not advance			
Artesha Richardson	Women's 400 m	58.43	7	did not advance			

== Boxing ==
Anguilla's boxing team consisted of two male athletes. The appearance in boxing marked the Commonwealth Games debut for the country in the sport.

Men

Athlete	Event	Round of 32	Round of 16	Quarterfinals	Semifinals	Final	
Athlete	Event	Opposition Result	Opposition Result	Opposition Result	Opposition Result	Opposition Result	Rank
Curlun Richardson	−69 kg	BYE	Newns (SCO); L 0 - 5	did not advance			
Kenwal Hodge	−75 kg	BYE	Tyrell (SAM); L 0 - 5	did not advance			

== Cycling ==
Anguilla's cycling team consisted of five male athletes.

=== Road ===
Men

Athlete	Event	Time	Rank
Hasani Hennis	Road race	DNF	
Huekeemi Hughes	Road race	DNF	
Sherwin Osborne	Road race	DNF	
Zambezi Richardson	Road race	DNF	
Saleem Romney	Road race	DNF	
Hasani Hennis	Time trial	56:11.05	34
Sherwin Osborne	Time trial	1:04:13.06	50
