= Anguilla at the 2010 Commonwealth Games =

- CG code: ANG
- CGA: Commonwealth Games Association of Anguilla

in Delhi, India
- Competitors: 12 in 2 sports
- Flag bearers: Opening: Ronnie Bryan; Closing:
- Medals: Gold 0 Silver 0 Bronze 0 Total 0

Commonwealth Games appearances (overview)
- 1998; 2002; 2006; 2010; 2014; 2018; 2022; 2026; 2030

Anguilla competed in the 2010 Commonwealth Games held in Delhi, India, from 3 to 14 October 2010.

Anguilla was represented by 12 athletes, competing in athletics and cycling.

== Athletics ==
=== Men ===
Track

Event	Athlete(s)	Heats		Round 2		Semi Finals		Final	
Event	Athlete(s)	Result	Rank	Result	Rank	Result	Rank	Result	Rank
100m	Kieron Rogers	10.81	DNQ	Did Not Advance					
100m	Denvil Ruan	11.43	DNQ	Did Not Advance					
100m	Kicio Welsh	DSQ		Did Not Advance					
200m	Desroy Findlay	24.41	DNQ	Did Not Advance					
200m	Shanoi Richardson	22.96	DNQ	Did Not Advance					
400m	Akeame Mussington	51.39	DNQ	n/a		Did Not Advance			

== Cycling ==
=== Road ===
==== Men ====
Event	Cyclist(s)	Time	Rank
167 km Road Race	Ronnie Bryan	DNF	
167 km Road Race	Justin Hodge	DNF	
167 km Road Race	Danny Laud	DNF	
167 km Road Race	Benjamin Phillip	DNF	
167 km Road Race	Brian Richardson	DNF	
167 km Road Race	Claude Richardson	DNF	

== See also ==
- 2010 Commonwealth Games
