= Anguilla at the 2009 World Championships in Athletics =

- WA code: AIA

in Berlin
- Competitors: 2 (1 man, 1 woman)
- Medals: Gold 0 Silver 0 Bronze 0 Total 0

World Championships in Athletics appearances (overview)
- 1983; 1987; 1991; 1993; 1995; 1997; 1999; 2001; 2003; 2005; 2007; 2009; 2011; 2013; 2015; 2017; 2019; 2022; 2023; 2025

Anguilla competed at the 2009 World Championships in Athletics in Berlin, Germany, which were held from 15 to 23 August 2009. The athlete delegation consisted of two competitors, sprinter Denvil Ruan and long jumper Shara Proctor competed for the team. Ruan competed in the men's 100 metres but failed to make it past the qualifying heats. Proctor had more success, qualifying for the women's long jump final and placed fifth overall with a new Anguillan national record.

== Background ==
The 2009 World Championships in Athletics were held at the Olympiastadion in Berlin, Germany. Under the auspices of the International Amateur Athletic Federation, this was the twelfth edition of the World Championships. It was held from 15 to 23 August 2009 and had 47 different events. Among the competing teams was Anguilla. For this edition of the World Championships in Athletics, sprinter Denvil Ruan and long jumper Shara Proctor competed for the team.

== Results ==
=== Men ===
Ruan competed in the qualifying heats of the men's 100 metres on 15 August 2009 in the seventh heat against seven other competitors. There, he recorded a time of 11.31 seconds for a new personal best and placed seventh, failing to advance further to the quarterfinals as only the top three of each heat and the next four fastest athletes would be able to do so.

Event	Athletes	Heats		Quarterfinals		Semifinal		Final	
Event	Athletes	Result	Rank	Result	Rank	Result	Rank	Result	Rank
100 m	Denvil Ruan	11.31 PB	7	did not advance					

=== Women ===
During the qualification round held on 21 August 2009, Proctor competed in Group A against 17 other competitors. There, she recorded a distance of 6.52 metres and qualified for the finals after placing within the top 12. In the finals held two days later, she recorded her longest distance of 6.71 metres for a new Anguillan national record and placed fifth overall.

Event	Athletes	Qualification		Final	
Event	Athletes	Result	Rank	Result	Rank
Long jump	Shara Proctor	6.52 q	12	6.71 NR	6
