= 2013 Leeward Islands Junior Championships in Athletics =

VIII Leeward Islands Junior/Youth Championships
- Dates: June 1
- Host city: Road Town, Tortola, British Virgin Islands
- Venue: A. O. Shirley Recreation Ground
- Level: Junior and Youth
- Events: 28 (15 boys, 13 girls)
- Participation: 89 (+ 42 BVI Twilight Invitational) athletes from 8 (+ 9 BVI Twilight Invitational) nations

The 2013 Leeward Islands Junior Championships in Athletics took place on June 1, 2013. The event was held at the A. O. Shirley Recreation Ground in Road Town, Tortola, British Virgin Islands. Detailed reports were published.

A total of 28 events were contested, 15 by boys and 13 by girls.

== Results ==
The Leeward Islands Junior Championships were held jointly with the BVI Twilight Invitational and the event was covered on Facebook. Complete results for both competitions can be found on the British Virgin Islands Athletics Association webpage.

=== BVI Twilight Invitational ===
The results of the BVI Twilight Invitational were discussed in detail.

Event	(gold) First		(silver) Second		(bronze) Third	
Men
100 metres (wind: -0.2 m/s)	Kim Collins; Saint Kitts	10.19	Antoine Adams; Saint Kitts	10.28	Dexter Lee; Jamaica	10.29
200 metres (wind: -0.3 m/s)	Zharnel Hughes; Anguilla	20.82	Antoine Adams; Saint Kitts	20.87	Joel Redhead; Grenada	20.91
400 metres	Gustavo Cuesta; Dominican Republic	45.87	Marcus Boyd; United States	46.26	Josh Scott; United States	46.79
Women
100 metres (wind: -0.5 m/s) A	Genoiska Cancel; Puerto Rico	11.62	Kimberly Hyacinthe; Canada	11.63	Karene King; British Virgin Islands	11.65
100 metres (wind: -1.0 m/s) B	Simone Facey; Jamaica	11.67	Margarita Manzueta; Dominican Republic	11.79	Crystal Emmanuel; Canada	11.82
200 metres (wind: -0.8 m/s) A	Patricia Hall; Jamaica	22.93	Karene King; British Virgin Islands	23.35	Kineke Alexander; Saint Vincent and the Grenadines	23.40
200 metres (wind: -0.3 m/s) B	Kimberly Hyacinthe; Canada	23.39	Crystal Emmanuel; Canada	23.43	Shai-Anne Davis; Canada	24.20
400 metres	Patricia Hall; Jamaica	51.34	Anastasia Le-Roy; Jamaica	51.65	Kineke Alexander; Saint Vincent and the Grenadines	51.67
4 x 100 metres relay	Canada; Crystal Emmanuel; Kimberly Hyacinthe; Shai-Anne Davis; Khamica Bingham	43.97	Dominican Republic; Fany Chalas; Mariely Sánchez; Marleny Mejía; Margarita Manzueta	44.13	British Virgin Islands; Ashley Kelly; Tahesia Harrigan-Scott; Chantel Malone; Karene King	44.65

=== Leeward Islands Junior Championships (Open) ===
==== Boys ====
Event	Gold		Silver		Bronze	
100 metres^{†} (wind: -0.1 m/s) A	Shernyl Burns^{†} Montserrat	10.59	Shaquoy Stephens; British Virgin Islands	10.67	Ricco Gumbs; Saint Kitts	10.70
100 metres (wind: -1.4 m/s) B	Ebenezer Joseph; British Virgin Islands	11.48	Tahj Osborne; British Virgin Islands	11.75	Emari Mills; U.S. Virgin Islands	11.81
200 metres (wind: -0.7 m/s) A	Ricco Gumbs; Saint Kitts	21.43	Julius Morris; Montserrat	21.51	Shaquoy Stephens; British Virgin Islands	21.71
200 metres (wind: -1.0 m/s) B	Royce David; British Virgin Islands	22.96	Ronique Todman; British Virgin Islands	23.25	Ebenezer Joseph; British Virgin Islands	23.34
400 metres A	Khari Herbert; British Virgin Islands	48.39	Warren Hazel; Saint Kitts	49.14	Kyron McMaster; British Virgin Islands	49.45
400 metres B	Morris Gumbs; Nevis	52.54	Aiden Hazzard; Anguilla	53.59	Rodney Griffin; U.S. Virgin Islands	53.74
800 metres A	Ka'jon Parris; Saint Kitts	1:57.17	Tarique Moses; British Virgin Islands	1:57.80	Malique Smith; U.S. Virgin Islands	2:01.99
800 metres B	Khari Creque; British Virgin Islands	2:07.12	Teymahl Huggins; British Virgin Islands	2:07.74		
Long Jump	Nathaniel Huggins; Saint Kitts	7.14m (wind: -1.8 m/s)	Kemoi Charles; U.S. Virgin Islands	6.40m (wind: -1.8 m/s)	Mikaile Browne; Anguilla	6.06m (wind: -0.7 m/s)
Shot Put	Eldred Henry; British Virgin Islands	16.73m	Kadeon Potter; British Virgin Islands	13.62m	Avery Joseph; U.S. Virgin Islands	11.09m
Discus Throw	Eldred Henry; British Virgin Islands	50.47m	Kadeon Potter; British Virgin Islands	32.25m	Avery Joseph; U.S. Virgin Islands	29.95m
Javelin throw	J'Anthon Sillidy; Saint Kitts	57.74m	Adrian Williams; Nevis	53.88m	Deon Vanterpool; Anguilla	49.95m
Javelin throw (700g)	Kevin Vanterpool; British Virgin Islands	47.08m	Avery Joseph; U.S. Virgin Islands	43.25m		
4 x 100 metres relay	Saint Kitts; Ricco Gumbs; Lonzo Wilkinson; Warren Hazel; Sadiki Tyson	41.52	United States Virgin Islands; Emari Mills; Malique Smith; Kohun Eugene; Kemoi Charles	45.26		
4 x 400 metres relay	British Virgin Islands; Kyron McMaster; Tarique Moses; Shaquoy Stephens; Khari Herbert	3:21.02	Saint Kitts; Ricco Gumbs; Warren Hazel; Sadiki Tyson; Lonzo Wilkinson	3:23.20		

^{†}: Shernyl Burns from Montserrat was already 22 years old.

==== Girls ====
Event	Gold		Silver		Bronze	
100 metres (wind: -1.5 m/s) A	Taylor Hill; British Virgin Islands	12.23	L'Tsha Fahie; British Virgin Islands	12.24	Nia Jack; U.S. Virgin Islands	12.43
100 metres (wind: -1.7 m/s) B	Shamica Glasgow; British Virgin Islands	12.73	Kayla King; U.S. Virgin Islands	12.75	Chelsi Flax-Solomon; British Virgin Islands	12.97
200 metres (wind: +0.1 m/s) A	Taylor Hill; British Virgin Islands	24.95	L'Tsha Fahie; British Virgin Islands	24.98	Chloe Williams; Nevis	25.74
200 metres (wind: m/s) B	Shamica Glasgow; British Virgin Islands	25.83	Sh'Kaida Lavacia; British Virgin Islands	26.31	Chelsi Flax-Solomon; British Virgin Islands	26.34
400 metres	Sareena Carti /Guadeloupe	54.53	Tarika Moses; British Virgin Islands	54.95	Jonel Lacey; British Virgin Islands	56.07
800 metres	Lakeisha Warner; British Virgin Islands	2:14.73	Cheryl Farial /Guadeloupe	2:17.02	Iman Derthelot /Guadeloupe	2:20.97
400 metres hurdles	Raida Gaza /Guadeloupe	1:01.90	Meghane Grandson /Guadeloupe	1:02.96	Keishonna Brookes; Saint Kitts	1:07.05
Long Jump (open or u17)	Krystal Liburd; Saint Kitts	5.96m (wind: +0.6 m/s)	Rechelle Meade; Anguilla	5.74m (wind: +0.0 m/s)	Kanishque Todman; British Virgin Islands	5.47m (wind: -1.1 m/s)
Shot Put (open or u17)	Trevia Gumbs; British Virgin Islands	14.03m	Dekoya Hodge; British Virgin Islands	11.41m	Kiwana Emmanuel; British Virgin Islands	10.34m
Discus Throw (open or u17)	Stavia Lewis; Saint Kitts	35.52m	Tynelle Gumbs; British Virgin Islands	33.32m	Kellie-Sheleen Chapman; U.S. Virgin Islands	24.29m
Javelin throw (600g)	Kerisha Powell; Nevis	32.86m				
Javelin throw (500g)	Tynelle Gumbs; British Virgin Islands	39.91m	Shanee Angol; Dominica	35.97m	Kellie-Sheleen Chapman; U.S. Virgin Islands	23.78m
4 x 100 metres relay	British Virgin Islands; Taylor Hill; L'Tsha Fahie; Jonel Lacey; Tarika Moses	46.62	(Guadeloupe) /Guadeloupe; Sareena Carti; Meghane Grandson; Raida Gaza; Iman Derthelot	47.97	Saint Kitts; Shanice Elliott; Keishonna Brookes; Keressa Eddy; Krystal Liburd	48.36

== Medal table (Leeward Islands Junior Championships, unofficial) ==
* Host nation (British Virgin Islands)

Rank	Nation	Gold	Silver	Bronze	Total
1	British Virgin Islands*	16	13	8	37
2	Saint Kitts	7	2	3	12
3	/Guadeloupe	2	3	1	6
4	Nevis	2	1	1	4
5	Montserrat	1	1	0	2
6	U.S. Virgin Islands	0	4	8	12
7	Anguilla	0	2	2	4
8	Dominica	0	1	0	1
Totals (8 entries)		28	27	23	78

== Participation ==
=== BVI Twilight Invitational ===
According to an unofficial count, 42 athletes from 13 countries participated.

- Anguilla (1)
- Barbados (4)
- British Virgin Islands (5)
- Canada (6)
- Dominican Republic (6)
- Grenada (1)
- Jamaica (8)
- Nevis (1)
- Puerto Rico (4)
- Saint Kitts (2)
- Saint Vincent and the Grenadines (1)
- Trinidad and Tobago (1)
- United States (2)

=== Leeward Islands Junior Championships (Open) ===
According to an unofficial count, 89 athletes from 8 countries participated.

- Anguilla (10)
- British Virgin Islands (36)
- Dominica (1)
- /Guadeloupe (6)
- Montserrat (2)
- Nevis (7)
- Saint Kitts (12)
- U.S. Virgin Islands (15)
