= Anguilla at the 2023 World Athletics Championships =

- Flag of Anguilla
- WA code: AIA

in Budapest, Hungary 19 August 2023 – 27 August 2023
- Competitors: 1 (1 man and 0 women)
- Medals: Gold 0 Silver 0 Bronze 0 Total 0

World Athletics Championships appearances (overview)
- 1983; 1987; 1991; 1993; 1995; 1997; 1999; 2001; 2003; 2005; 2007; 2009; 2011; 2013; 2015; 2017; 2019; 2022; 2023; 2025

Anguilla competed at the 2023 World Athletics Championships in Budapest, Hungary, which were held from 19 to 27 August 2023. The athlete delegation of the country was composed of one competitor, sprinter Terrone Webster who would compete in the men's 100 metres. He qualified for the Championships upon being selected by the Anguilla Amateur Athletic Federation. In the preliminaries, Webster placed fourth out of the seven competitors that competed in his heat and did not advance to the semifinals of the event.

== Background ==
The 2023 World Athletics Championships in Budapest, Hungary, were held from 19 to 27 August 2023. The Championships were held at the National Athletics Centre. To qualify for the World Championships, athletes had to reach an entry standard (e.g. time or distance), place in a specific position at select competitions, be a wild card entry, or qualify through their World Athletics Ranking at the end of the qualification period.

As Anguilla did not meet any of the four standards, they could send either one male or one female athlete in one event of the Championships who has not yet qualified. The Anguilla Amateur Athletic Federation selected sprinter Terrone Webster who held a personal best of 10.97 seconds in the 100 metres at the time of his selection for the Championships. This was Webster's first appearance for Anguilla at the World Athletics Championships.

== Results ==
Key

- Q = Qualified for the next round
- q = Qualified for the next round as a fastest loser or, in field events, by position without achieving the qualifying target
- NR = National record
- PB = Personal best
- SB = Season best
- N/A = Round not applicable for the event

=== Men ===
Webster competed in the preliminary round of the men's 100 metres on 19 August against six other competitors in his heat. He raced in the first preliminary round and recorded a time of 11.03 seconds. There, he placed fourth and did not advance further to the heats. As of 1 May 2026, this would be Webster's last international appearance for Anguilla as per his World Athletics profile.

Track and road events

Athlete	Event	Preliminary		Heat		Semifinal		Final	
Athlete	Event	Result	Rank	Result	Rank	Result	Rank	Result	Rank
Terrone Webster	100 metres	11.03	4	Did not advance					
