= Anguilla at the 2002 Commonwealth Games =

- CG code: ANG
- CGA: Commonwealth Games Association of Anguilla
- Flag bearers: Opening: Closing:
- Medals: Gold 0 Silver 0 Bronze 0 Total 0

Commonwealth Games appearances (overview)
- 1998; 2002; 2006; 2010; 2014; 2018; 2022; 2026; 2030

Anguilla was represented at the 2002 Commonwealth Games by Anguilla Amateur Athletic Association (AAAA) and abbreviated ANG.

Anguilla was first represented the 1998 Commonwealth Games in Kuala Lumpur. This was Anguilla's second Games.

== Medals ==
| | Gold | Silver | Bronze | Total |
|---|---|---|---|---|
| Anguilla | 0 | 0 | 0 | 0 |

== Athletics ==
Women's 100 Metres

- Desiree Cocks - 7th in Heat 4, 12.88s

Women's 200 Metres

- Shyrone Hughes - 5th in Heat 3, 26.33s

== Officials ==
The Chef de Mission of the Anguillan team was former Hampshire County Cricket Club fast bowler, Cardigan Connor.
