= Asian Athletics Championships =

International athletics tournament

- Status: Active
- Genre: Athletics Championship
- Frequency: Bi-annual
- Years active: 1973–present
- Inaugurated: 1973 Marikina (Philippines)
- Previous event: 2025 Gumi (South Korea)
- Next event: 2027 Xiamen (China)
- Organiser: Asian Athletics Association
- Website: Website
- 2025 Asian Athletics Championships

The Asian Athletics Championships is an event organized by the Asian Athletics Association.

== History ==
The competition courted controversy with the IAAF when political in-fighting arose after Israel was excluded from participation in 1977. That edition of the competition was canceled, with championships between 1979 and 1989 being regarded by the IAAF as unofficial, called the "Asian Track and Field Meeting" as a result. This situation was resolved when Israel began competing in European Athletic Association events in 1990.

== Editions ==
Regarded by the IAAF as unofficial and called the Asian Track and Field Meeting as a result.

Edition	Year	Host City	Host Country	Dates	Venue	Events	Nations	Athletes	Winner
1	1973	Marikina	Philippines	18–23 November	Rodriguez Sports Center	37			Japan
2	1975	Seoul	South Korea	9–14 June	Dongdaemun Stadium	39			Japan
—N/a	1977	Cancelled due to political controversy							
3	1979	Tokyo	Japan	31 May – 3 June	National Stadium	38			Japan
4	1981	Tokyo	Japan	5–7 June	National Stadium	37			Japan
5	1983	Kuwait City	Kuwait	3–9 November	Kuwait National Stadium	38			China
6	1985	Jakarta	Indonesia	25–29 September	Gelora Senayan Stadium	42			China
7	1987	Singapore	Singapore	22–26 July	National Stadium	40			China
8	1989	New Delhi	India	14–19 November	Jawaharlal Nehru Stadium	40			China
9	1991	Kuala Lumpur	Malaysia	19–23 October	Stadium Merdeka	40			China
10	1993	Manila	Philippines	30 November – 4 December	Rizal Memorial Stadium	41			China
11	1995	Jakarta	Indonesia	20–24 September	Gelora Senayan Stadium	41			China
12	1998	Fukuoka	Japan	19–22 July	Hakatanomori Athletic Stadium	43			China
13	2000	Jakarta	Indonesia	28–31 August	Gelora Senayan Stadium	43	37	441	China
14	2002	Colombo	Sri Lanka	9–12 August	Sugathadasa Stadium	43			China
15	2003	Manila	Philippines	20–23 September	Rizal Memorial Stadium	43			China
16	2005	Incheon	South Korea	1–4 September	Incheon Munhak Stadium	43	35	536	China
17	2007	Amman	Jordan	25–29 July	Amman International Stadium	44	34		China
18	2009	Guangzhou	China	10–14 November	Guangdong Olympic Stadium	44	37	505	China
19	2011	Kobe	Japan	7–10 July	Kobe Universiade Memorial Stadium	42	40	464	China
20	2013	Pune	India	3–7 July	Shree Shiv Chhatrapati Sports Complex	42	42	522	China
21	2015	Wuhan	China	3–7 June	Wuhan Sports Center Stadium	42	40	497	China
22	2017	Bhubaneswar	India	5–9 July	Kalinga Stadium	42	41	560	India
23	2019	Doha	Qatar	21–24 April	Khalifa International Stadium	43	42	595	Bahrain
24	2021	Hangzhou	China	20–23 May	Hangzhou Olympic Sports Center	Cancelled due to COVID-19 pandemic			
25	2023	Bangkok	Thailand	12–16 July	National Stadium	45	42	728	Japan
26	2025	Gumi	South Korea	27–31 May	Gumi Civic Stadium	45	43	1193	China
27	2027	Xiamen	China	25–30 May	Xiamen Egret Stadium				
28	2029	Surakarta	Indonesia		Manahan Stadium				

== Medals table ==
As of 2025 edition

Rank	Nation	Gold	Silver	Bronze	Total
1	China	344	236	130	710
2	Japan	177	217	243	637
3	India	102	130	146	378
4	Qatar	68	41	44	153
5	Kazakhstan	38	39	48	125
6	Bahrain	32	28	17	77
7	South Korea	30	59	67	156
8	Saudi Arabia	28	24	15	67
9	Thailand	26	35	33	94
10	Sri Lanka	22	20	27	69
11	Uzbekistan	20	31	23	74
12	Iran	20	19	22	61
13	Chinese Taipei	18	42	66	126
14	Kuwait	17	19	9	45
15	Philippines	16	11	18	45
16	North Korea	12	11	23	46
17	Vietnam	9	5	8	22
18	Kyrgyzstan	8	2	5	15
19	Malaysia	6	16	28	50
20	United Arab Emirates	6	4	3	13
21	Iraq	5	9	9	23
22	Tajikistan	5	2	1	8
23	Pakistan	3	3	3	9
24	Syria	3	2	6	11
25	Myanmar	3	2	4	9
26	Israel	3	1	4	8
27	Singapore	2	10	5	17
28	Indonesia	1	9	9	19
29	Hong Kong	1	5	3	9
30	Oman	1	2	4	7
31	Jordan	1	1	3	5
32	Azerbaijan	1	1	1	3
33	Turkmenistan	1	1	0	2
34	Lebanon	0	2	2	4
35	Mongolia	0	1	1	2
36	Cambodia	0	0	2	2
36	Nepal	0	0	2	2
Totals (37 entries)		1,029	1,040	1,034	3,103

== See also ==
- Athletics at the Asian Games
- Asian Youth Athletics Championships
- Asian Juniors Athletics Championships
- Asian Masters Athletics Championships
- Asian Para Athletics Championships
- Asian University Athletics Championships
