= 2012 Leeward Islands Junior Championships in Athletics =

VII Leeward Islands Junior/Youth Championships
- Dates: June 9–10
- Host city: Road Town, Tortola, British Virgin Islands
- Venue: A. O. Shirley Recreation Ground
- Level: Junior and Youth
- Events: 45 (12 junior boys, 13 junior girls, 10 youth boys, 10 youth boys)
- Participation: 87 athletes from 7 nations

The 2012 Leeward Islands Junior Championships in Athletics took place on June 9–10, 2012. The event was held at the A. O. Shirley Recreation Ground in Road Town, Tortola, British Virgin Islands. Detailed reports were published.

A total of 45 events were contested, 22 by boys and 23 by girls.

== Medal summary ==
Complete results can be found on the British Virgin Islands Athletics Association webpage.

=== Boys (U-20) ===
Event	Gold		Silver		Bronze	
100 metres (wind: -0.1 m/s)	Zharnel Hughes; Anguilla	10.45 CR	Cejhae Greene; Antigua and Barbuda	10.69	Jared Jarvis; Antigua and Barbuda	10.77
200 metres (wind: -2.0 m/s)	Zharnel Hughes; Anguilla	21.26 CR	Cejhae Greene; Antigua and Barbuda	21.89	Jared Jarvis; Antigua and Barbuda	22.29
400 metres	Khari Herbert; British Virgin Islands	49.29	Tarique Moses; British Virgin Islands	50.00	Mark Phillips; Antigua and Barbuda	51.17
800 metres	Tarique Moses; British Virgin Islands	2:00.78	Jameel Joseph; Trinidad and Tobago	2:03.21	Javvae Hippolyte; Antigua and Barbuda	2:03.91
1500 metres ^{†}	Kenneth Benjamin; Antigua and Barbuda	4:20.85	Javvae Hippolyte; Antigua and Barbuda	4:28.53	Ateniah Roacher; U.S. Virgin Islands	4:31.06
High jump	Javvae Hippolyte; Antigua and Barbuda	1.86m	Theron Niles; Anguilla	1.83m	Brandon Andrew; British Virgin Islands	1.60m
Long jump	Brandon Andrew; British Virgin Islands	6.22m (wind: +1.6 m/s)	Xavier Joseph; Antigua and Barbuda	5.85m w (wind: +2.6 m/s)	Theron Niles; Anguilla	5.56m (wind: +0.9 m/s)
Shot put (exhibition)	Eldred Henry; British Virgin Islands	14.53m CR	Bradley Carbon; U.S. Virgin Islands	10.76m		
Discus throw	Eldred Henry; British Virgin Islands	44.19m CR	Bradley Carbon; U.S. Virgin Islands	29.11m	Brandon Andrew; British Virgin Islands	27.56m
Javelin throw	Brandon Andrew; British Virgin Islands	39.69m	Bradley Carbon; U.S. Virgin Islands	36.51m		
4 x 100 metres relay (exhibition)	Antigua and Barbuda; Xavier Joseph; Cejhae Greene; Mark Phillips; Jared Jarvis	41.26 CR	British Virgin Islands; Shaquoy Stephens; Khari Herbert; Brandon Andrew; Royce David	42.92	Anguilla; Zharnel Hughes; Theron Niles; Mauriel Carty; D'Quan Federicks	45.91
4 x 400 metres relay	British Virgin Islands; Shaquoy Stephens; Khari Herbert; Tarique Moses; Royce David	3:17.00 CR	Antigua and Barbuda; Mark Phillips; Matthew Mitchell; Javvae Hippolyte; Cejhae Greene	3:20.82	United States Virgin Islands; Malique Smith; Karim Jno-Finn; Deandre Rawlins; Rodney Griffin	3:42.41

^{†}: Open event for both U20 and U17 athletes.

=== Girls (U-20) ===
Event	Gold		Silver		Bronze	
100 metres (wind: -1.5 m/s)	Shaian Vandenburg; British Virgin Islands	12.41	Delita Daniel; Antigua and Barbuda	12.88	Renee Fleming; Anguilla	12.90
200 metres (wind: -2.8 m/s)	Shaian Vandenburg; British Virgin Islands	25.98	Viani Joseph; Antigua and Barbuda	26.59	Renee Fleming; Anguilla	26.75
400 metres	Viani Joseph; Antigua and Barbuda	59.42	Niayla Smith; British Virgin Islands	1:00.91	Rekiesha Leverette; Anguilla	1:04.08
800 metres (exhibition)	Cassie Vitalis; Antigua and Barbuda	2:22.45	Niayla Smith; British Virgin Islands	2:27.75	Dee-Ann Rogers; Anguilla	2:45.36^{‡}
1500 metres ^{†}	Cassie Vitalis; Antigua and Barbuda	5:04.33	Tenijah Morris; Antigua and Barbuda	5:20.37	Ashley Paddie; U.S. Virgin Islands	6:28.37
100 metres hurdles (wind: -0.7 m/s) (exhibition)	Elza Plante /Guadeloupe	14.49 CR	Dee-Ann Rogers; Anguilla	16.00	Deya Erickson; British Virgin Islands	16.69
High jump	Tarikah Warner; British Virgin Islands	1.40m	Rekiesha Leverette; Anguilla	1.40m	Alile Browne; U.S. Virgin Islands	1.25m
Long jump	Dee-Ann Rogers; Anguilla	5.12m (wind:NWI)^{‡}	Tarikah Warner; British Virgin Islands	5.04m (wind:NWI)	Delita Daniel; Antigua and Barbuda	4.88m (wind:NWI)
Discus throw (exhibition)	Annecha Graham; British Virgin Islands	20.50m				
Javelin throw (exhibition)	Annecha Graham; British Virgin Islands	29.57m	Dee-Ann Rogers; Anguilla	18.23m^{‡}		
Heptathlon ^{†}	Dee-Ann Rogers; Anguilla	3813 pts ^{J}	Ashley McCall; British Virgin Islands	3066 pts ^{Y}		
4 x 100 metres relay (exhibition)	British Virgin Islands; Niayla Smith; Natisha Claxton; Shanique Olliver; Shaian Vandenburg	50.20 CR				
4 x 400 metres relay ^{†}	British Virgin Islands; Lakeisha Warner; Tarika Moses; Jonel Lacey; Taylor Hill	3:49.19 CR	Antigua and Barbuda; Kiwandi Morson; Cassie Vitalis; Tenijah Morris; Viani Joseph	4:06.54	United States Virgin Islands; Alile Browne; Keshema Fleming; Karen Dascent; Ashley Paddie	4:18.36

^{†}: Open event for both U20 and U17 athletes.
^{‡}: Result obtained during heptathlon.
^{J}: Junior implements.
^{Y}: Youth implements.

=== Boys (U-17) ===
Event	Gold		Silver		Bronze	
100 metres (wind: -1.3 m/s)	Michaiah Washington; Antigua and Barbuda	11.66	Alex Stewart; Antigua and Barbuda	11.76	Dominic Adams; British Virgin Islands	11.98
200 metres (wind: -3.2 m/s)	Matthew Mitchell; Antigua and Barbuda	22.81	Kyron McMaster; British Virgin Islands	23.29	Deshawn Douglas; British Virgin Islands	23.69
400 metres	Matthew Mitchell; Antigua and Barbuda	49.66	Kyron McMaster; British Virgin Islands	50.51	Deshawn Douglas; British Virgin Islands	51.94
800 metres	Matthew Mitchell; Antigua and Barbuda	2:03.73 CR	Kenneth Benjamin; Antigua and Barbuda	2:04.08	Malique Smith; U.S. Virgin Islands	2:04.41
High jump	Kyron McMaster; British Virgin Islands	1.86m	Malique Smith; U.S. Virgin Islands	1.80m	Aundre Turnbull; British Virgin Islands	1.75m
Long jump	Travis Campbell; Antigua and Barbuda	5.93m w (wind: +2.4 m/s)	Michaiah Washington; Antigua and Barbuda	5.90m (wind: +1.5 m/s)	Aundre Turnbull; British Virgin Islands	5.89m (wind: +1.3 m/s)
Shot put	Amari Joseph; U.S. Virgin Islands	11.54m	Kadeon Potter; British Virgin Islands	11.10m	Kevin Vanterpool; British Virgin Islands	10.42m
Discus throw	Kevin Vanterpool; British Virgin Islands	30.17m	Dominic Adams; British Virgin Islands	29.86m	Avery Joseph; U.S. Virgin Islands	27.84m
Javelin throw	Kevin Vanterpool; British Virgin Islands	48.18m CR	Travis Campbell; Antigua and Barbuda	42.18m	Dominic Adams; British Virgin Islands	40.69m
4 x 100 metres relay	Antigua and Barbuda; Travis Campbell; Matthew Mitchell; Alex Stewart; Michaiah Washington	43.97 CR	British Virgin Islands; Tahj Osborne; Kyron McMaster; Deshawn Douglas; Dominic Adams	45.03	United States Virgin Islands; Malique Smith; Karim Jno-Finn; Rodney Griffin; Bariki George	48.28

=== Girls (U-17) ===
Event	Gold		Silver		Bronze	
100 metres (wind: -3.0 m/s)	Taylor Hill; British Virgin Islands	12.61	Nelda Huggins; British Virgin Islands	12.67	Bliss Soleyn; Antigua and Barbuda	12.74
200 metres (wind: -3.3 m/s)	Taylor Hill; British Virgin Islands	25.44	Nia Jack; U.S. Virgin Islands	25.46	Bliss Soleyn; Antigua and Barbuda	25.86
400 metres	Sareena Carti /Guadeloupe	55.31 CR	Tarika Moses; British Virgin Islands	56.46	Jonel Lacey; British Virgin Islands	56.94
800 metres	Lakeisha Warner; British Virgin Islands	2:10.92 CR	Cheryl Farial /Guadeloupe	2:13.73	Tenijah Morris; Antigua and Barbuda	2:31.98
High jump	Kala Penn; British Virgin Islands	1.50m	Nicole Gumbs; Anguilla	1.45m	Rechelle Meade; Anguilla	1.40m
Long jump	Kala Penn; British Virgin Islands	5.41m (wind: -1.9 m/s)	Rechelle Meade; Anguilla	5.15m (wind: -2.6 m/s)	Nicole Gumbs; Anguilla	5.00m (wind: -3.0 m/s)
Shot put	Trevia Gumbs; British Virgin Islands	13.57m CR	Tynelle Gumbs; British Virgin Islands	10.72m	Keosha Quinn; U.S. Virgin Islands	8.52m
Discus throw^{*}	Trevia Gumbs; British Virgin Islands	29.95m	Tynelle Gumbs; British Virgin Islands	29.79m	Keosha Quinn; U.S. Virgin Islands	18.44m
Javelin throw	Tynelle Gumbs; British Virgin Islands	36.05m CR	Nicole Gumbs; Anguilla	20.12m	Keosha Quinn; U.S. Virgin Islands	19.60m
4 x 100 metres relay	British Virgin Islands; Taylor Hill; Nelda Huggins; Jonel Lacey; Tarika Moses	47.89 CR	United States Virgin Islands; Karen Dascent; Britney Sage; Nia Jack; Keshema Fleming	49.27	Antigua and Barbuda; Sweeney Bruce; Melinda Simpson; Bliss Soleyn; Kiwandi Morson	49.48

^{*}: In discus throw event, Jasmine Dalmida from the British Virgin Islands was 3rd in 24.54m competing as a guest.

== Medal table (unofficial) ==
This is the unofficial medal count without events marked as exhibition.

* Host nation (British Virgin Islands)

Rank	Nation	Gold	Silver	Bronze	Total
1	British Virgin Islands (IVB)*	22	13	10	45
2	Antigua and Barbuda (ATG)	10	13	9	32
3	Commonwealth Games Federation (CGF)	4	5	6	15
4	U.S. Virgin Islands (VIR)	1	5	11	17
5	Guadeloupe (GLP)	1	1	0	2
6	Trinidad and Tobago (TTO)	0	1	0	1
Totals (6 entries)		38	38	36	112

== Participation ==
According to an unofficial count, 87 athletes from 7 countries participated. The announced athletes from Dominica did not show.

- Anguilla (11)
- Antigua and Barbuda (18)
- British Virgin Islands (33)
- /Guadeloupe (3)
- Montserrat (2)
- Trinidad and Tobago (4)
- U.S. Virgin Islands (16)
