= Liu Xiao =

Liu Xiao may refer to:

- Liu Xiao (diplomat) (1908–1988), Chinese diplomat
- Liu Xiao (fencer) (born 1987), Chinese fencer
- Liu Xiao (long jumper), Chinese long jump athlete
