= Taylor Hill (sprinter) =

British Virgin Islands sprinter (born 1996)

Personal information
- Born: February 2, 1996 (age 30)

Sport
- Country: British Virgin Islands
- Sport: Athletics
- Event: Sprint
- Updated on 23 April 2015

Taylor Hill (born 2 February 1996) is a sprinter from the British Virgin Islands.

== Personal bests ==
Event	Result	Venue	Date
100 m	11.83 s (wind: -0.1 m/s)	(Saint Kitts and Nevis) Basseterre	4 Apr 2015
200 m	24.24 s (wind: +0.9 m/s)	(Saint Kitts and Nevis) Basseterre	5 Apr 2015

== Competition record ==
Year	Competition	Venue	Position	Event	Notes
Representing the British Virgin Islands
2010	CARIFTA Games (U17)	George Town, Cayman Islands	6th (h)	100 m	12.26 (wind: +1.2 m/s)
2010	Central American and Caribbean Junior Championships (U17)	Santo Domingo, Dominican Republic	4th	100 m	12.38 (wind: -1.2 m/s)
2010	Central American and Caribbean Junior Championships (U17)	Santo Domingo, Dominican Republic	8th	200 m	26.55 (wind: -1.2 m/s)
2011	CARIFTA Games (U17)	Montego Bay, Jamaica	3rd (h)	100 m	12.47 (wind: -2.3 m/s)
2011	CARIFTA Games (U17)	Montego Bay, Jamaica	4th (h)	200 m	24.79 (wind: -0.4 m/s)
2012	CARIFTA Games (U17)	Hamilton, Bermuda	5th	100 m	12.10 w (wind: +4.6 m/s)
2012	CARIFTA Games (U17)	Hamilton, Bermuda	3rd	4x100 m relay	48.22
2012	CARIFTA Games (U17)	Hamilton, Bermuda	4th	4x400 m relay	3:59.25
2012	Leeward Islands Junior Championships (U17)	Road Town, Tortola, British Virgin Islands	1st	100m	12.61 (wind: -3.0 m/s)
2012	Leeward Islands Junior Championships (U17)	Road Town, Tortola, British Virgin Islands	1st	200m	25.44 (wind: -3.3 m/s)
2012	Leeward Islands Junior Championships (U17)	Road Town, Tortola, British Virgin Islands	1st	4x100m relay	47.89
2012	Leeward Islands Junior Championships (U17)	Road Town, Tortola, British Virgin Islands	1st	4x400m relay (Open)	3:49.19
2013	CARIFTA Games (U20)	Nassau, Bahamas	6th (h)	100 m	12.36 (wind: +0.7 m/s)
2013	CARIFTA Games (U20)	Nassau, Bahamas	4th (h)	200 m	25.84 (wind: -0.4 m/s)
2013	Leeward Islands Junior Championships (U20)	Road Town, Tortola, British Virgin Islands	1st	100m	12.23 (wind: -1.5 m/s)
2013	Leeward Islands Junior Championships (U20)	Road Town, Tortola, British Virgin Islands	1st	200m	24.95 (wind: +0.1 m/s)
2013	Leeward Islands Junior Championships (U20)	Road Town, Tortola, British Virgin Islands	1st	4x100m relay	46.62
2013	World Youth Championships	Donetsk, Ukraine	23rd (h)	100m	12.10 (wind: -0.1 m/s)
2013	World Youth Championships	Donetsk, Ukraine	2nd	Medley relay	2:07.40
2014	CARIFTA Games (U20)	Fort-de-France, Martinique	9th (h)	100 m	12.05 (wind: +2.3 m/s)
2014	CARIFTA Games (U20)	Fort-de-France, Martinique	11th (h)	200 m	25.07 (wind: +1.3 m/s)
2015	CARIFTA Games (U20)	Basseterre, Saint Kitts and Nevis	5th	100 m	11.96 (wind: +0.5 m/s)
2015	CARIFTA Games (U20)	Basseterre, Saint Kitts and Nevis	9th (h)	200 m	24.24 (wind: +0.9 m/s)
2015	CARIFTA Games (U20)	Basseterre, Saint Kitts and Nevis	2nd	4x400 m relay	3:46.43
2016	NACAC U23 Championships	San Salvador, El Salvador	7th	100 m	12.04
