= Margrethe Renstrøm =

Norwegian long jumper (born 1985)

Personal information
- Born: 21 March 1985 (age 41)

Sport
- Country: Norway
- Sport: Athletics
- Event: Long jump
Medal record
European Championships
Bronze medal – third place	2012 Helsinki	Long jump

Margrethe Renstrøm (born 21 March 1985) is a Norwegian long jumper. She has competed in international junior and senior championships, most notably the 2009 World Championships. She is best known for her personal best is 6.68 metres, achieved in July 2010 in Barcelona, which is the current Norwegian record. When she broke the record, it was the oldest existing athletics record in Norway. Renstrøm also has 13.25 metres in the triple jump, achieved in July 2006 at Bislett stadion.

== Early life and career ==
She hails from Søgne Municipality, and represented the club Søgne IL in her early career. This is the same club that Kristen Fløgstad, the Norwegian record holder in the men's long jump, once belonged to.

At the 2001 European Youth Olympic Festival she won the gold medal with a jump of 6.15 metres, one centimetre ahead of silver medalist Elysée Vésanes. In the qualification round she had jumper 5.98 metres. She also competed in the 4 x 100 metres relay, but the Norwegian team did not finish the race. In 2002, she made her debut at the European Cup, but failed to register a valid jump. She finished tenth in the triple jump at the 2003 European Junior Championships, having registered 12.70 in the qualification and 12.78 in the final round. In the period before 2005 she won two Norwegian national titles in the long jump; in 2002 and 2003.

Her personal best remained 6.15 for many years, as she registered 6.08 metres in 2002, 6.10 metres in 2003, 6.06 metres in 2004 and 6.11 metres in 2005. In the triple jump she recorded 12.88 metres in 2003, only 12.03 metres in 2005 before soaring back to 13.03 metres in 2006. Also, in June 2001 she achieved 1.69 metres in the high jump, an all-time best for her. She has a personal best in the 100 metres hurdles of 14.39 seconds, achieved on Nadderud stadion in June 2002.

In the autumn of 2004 she moved to Oslo to study at the University of Oslo. She joined the club IK Tjalve and started training under Dan Simion. From time to time she also participated in training sessions for a national high jump project, where Simion was involved for a period. She was reluctant to set any goals for the future, but had to do it as a part of the national association's talent program. Her goals at the time was 6.25 metres in the long jump and 13.00–13.20 metres in the triple jump. She later started training with her mother, and also started studying physiotherapy. Her father is a coach in Kristiansand-based club Kristiansands IF.

== Later career ==
=== Post-teenage years ===
In 2005, she won her third national long jump title, and also the bronze medal in the triple jump. In 2006, she had her second outing in the European Cup (in the Second League), and she performed well for the Norwegian team with one second place and one third place. In 2007, she competed at the European U23 Championships, where she qualified for the final with a 6.27 m leap, but then only managed 6.10 to finish eleventh.

Between 2006 and 2008 she won five national gold medals, taking doubles in long and triple jump in both 2006 and 2007. Also she won the long jump gold medal in 2008. Her strongest rival was heptathlete Ida Marcussen, whom she beat with only three centimetres in 2005 and six centimetres in 2006. She has one medal in the standing long jump a silver medal which she won at the 2006 Norwegian Indoor Championships behind Stine Kufaas. Her three long jump golds all came with personal best jumps; 6.32 metres in 2006 and 6.33 metres in both 2007 and 2008. She jumped 13.25 in winning the 2006 national triple jump title at Bislett stadion, and this still stands as her career best.

=== Breakthrough ===
In 2009, she improved her personal best again. She started with 6.18 and 6.23, and then achieved 6.36 metres during the Bislett Games. She then improved further to 6.42 during the summer. At the 2009 Norwegian Championships at Stampesletta in Lillehammer, she entered the long jump competition, but started out with two fouls. In the third jump she leaped to 6.64 metres in +0.4 m/s tailwind. This was a new Norwegian record, beating Berit Berthelsen's 6.56 mark. Achieved in 1968, it had been the oldest Norwegian athletics record. Renstrøm was awarded with about 180,000 kr from a monetary fund set up to attract would-be record breakers. (Note: The oldest Norwegian athletics record is now Arne Tvervaag's 3.71 metres in the standing long jump, achieved in November 1968.) She was a contender for the King's Cup, an award to the best male and female athlete at the Norwegian Championships, but the Cup instead went to race walker Kjersti Tysse Plätzer. Following the record jump she competed at the 2009 World Championships. With a jump of 6.31 metres in the qualification she failed to reach the final.
