= Asian University Athletics Championships =

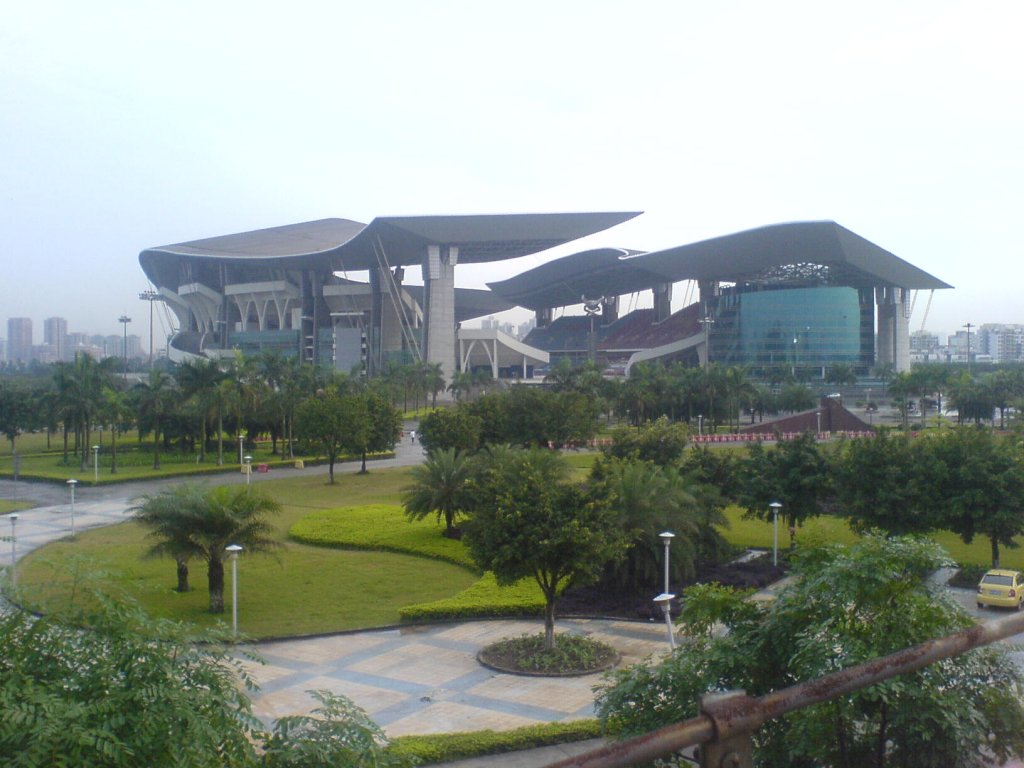
- The host stadium
- Dates: November 2005
- Host city: Guangzhou, China
- Venue: Guangdong Olympic Stadium
- Events: 34

The Asian University Athletics Championships was an international athletics competition for student athletes from Asian countries. It was staged on one occasion in November 2005 at the Guangdong Olympic Stadium in Guangzhou, China. A total of 19 nations competed, including Russian athletes from the Far Eastern Federal University in Vladivostok.

== Medal summary ==
=== Men ===
Event	Gold		Silver		Bronze	
100 metres	Wen Yongyi (CHN)	10.45	Liu Yuan-kai (TPE)	10.56	Lin Yi-wei (TPE)	10.72
200 metres	Xu Zizhou (CHN)	21.24	Liu Yuan-kai (TPE)	21.45	Wang Youxin (CHN)	21.72
400 metres	Wang Youxin (CHN)	47.34	Tan Biao (CHN)	47.67	Chen Chih-hseun (TPE)	47.94
800 metres	Yang Shang-ju (TPE)	1:54.96	Hu Zhongwei (CHN)	1:55.92	Mikhail Larkin (RUS)	1:56.77
1500 metres	Yu Xingbo (CHN)	3:56.05	Mikhail Larkin (RUS)	3:56.96	Yang Shang-ju (TPE)	3:57.76
5000 metres	Zhao Xin (CHN)	15:13.33	Aleksandr Baranyuk (RUS)	15:14.07	Chiang Chieh-wen (TPE)	15:18.62
10000 metres	Chiang Chieh-wen (TPE)	31:44.85	Zhao Xin (CHN)	31:53.12	Bai Ye (CHN)	32:04.08
110 metres hurdles	Xing Yan'an (CHN)	14.06	Wang Chunjue (CHN)	14.39	Ko Wen-pin (TPE)	14.50
400 metres hurdles	? (CHN)	???	?	?	?	?
3000 m steeplechase	Patikarn Pechsricha (THA)	9:16.99	Aleksandr Baranyuk (RUS)	9:20.53	Zhang Xiaolei (CHN)	9:27.53
4 × 100 m relay	Chinese Taipei (TPE)	40.81	Sun Yat-sen University (CHN)	40.86	Hong Kong (HKG)	41.54
4 × 400 metres relay	Jinan University (CHN)	3:11.08	Chinese Taipei (TPE)	3:15.66	FENU Institute (RUS)	3:26.54
High jump	Tsao Chih-hao (TPE)	2.10 m	Li Wei-yi (TPE)	2.07 m	Zhao Yaofeng (CHN) Aleksandr Zyryanov (RUS)	2.03 m
Pole vault	Yu Shih-chung (TPE)	4.80 m	Che Zhenbang (CHN)	4.20 m	Fitri Hariyadi (INA)	4.10 m
Long jump	Denis Sinyavskiy (RUS)	7.72 m	Tseng Chih-huei (TPE)	7.52 m	Wu Chien-Liang (TPE)	7.46 m
Triple jump	Fu Chuanyong (CHN)	16.04 m	Hu Haiqiang (CHN)	15.89 m	Denis Sinyavskiy (RUS)	15.70 m
Shot put	Chang Ming-huang (TPE)	18.18 m	Li Ming-chun (TPE)	14.32 m	Yu Bo (CHN)	12.96 m
Discus throw	Chang Ming-huang (TPE)	52.43 m	Wang Yao-huei (TPE)	49.22 m	Ron Koh (SIN)	37.08 m
Hammer throw	? (CHN)	?	?	?	?	?
Javelin throw	Chou Yi-Chen (TPE)	70.03 m	H.A.D.H. Perera (SRI)	59.27 m	Wei Pu (CHN)	52.88 m
Decathlon	Meng Hsiang-tsu (TPE)	7018 pts	Tung Chun-chseh (TPE)	6695 pts	Shi Hao (CHN)	5787 pts

=== Women ===
Event	Gold		Silver		Bronze	
100 metres	Pacharin Jandang (THA)	12.10	Li Xiujuan (CHN)	12.21	Chan Ho Yee (HKG)	12.31
200 metres	Tang Xiaoyin (CHN)	24.33	Gao Lihua (CHN)	24.38	Yelena Voynova (RUS)	25.36
400 metres	Tang Xiaoyin (CHN)	54.05	Li Xueji (CHN)	55.15	Yelena Voynova (RUS)	56.69
800 metres	? (CHN)	?	?	?	?	?
1500 metres	Huang Xiaofeng (CHN)	4:33.36	Mariya Zayichenko (RUS)	4:37.78	Olga Shpilevaya (RUS)	4:41.82
5000 metres	Yu Lanying (CHN)	17:52.93	T. Nikeshina (RUS)	18:00.15	Chen Weifen (CHN)	18:04.65
10,000 metres	Yu Lanying (CHN)	39:44.19	T. Nikeshina (RUS)	40:01.34	Liu Hong (CHN)	40:13.86
100 metres hurdles	Wen Guiying (CHN)	14.20	Pan Yalian (CHN)	14.27	Leung Shuk Wa (HKG)	15.00
400 metres hurdles	Chen Yumei (CHN)	58.96	Qiu Xiangfeng (CHN)	64.77	Jasmine Chavez (PHI)	65.26
4 × 100 m relay	Jinan University (CHN)	46.04	Sun Yat-sen University (CHN)	46.79	Hong Kong (HKG)	48.44
High jump	Zhao Ning (CHN)	1.77	Ma Bei (CHN)	1.76	Anna Belonogova (RUS)	1.65
Pole vault	He Wenya (CHN)	4.00	Hsu Hsueh-Chin (TPE)	3.90	Huang Yu (CHN)	3.60
Long jump	Zhang Yuan (CHN)	6.13	Liu Xiao (CHN)	5.77	Anna Belonogova (RUS)	5.59
Triple jump	Liu Tingting (CHN)	12.79	Liu Xiao (CHN)	12.58	Only two athletes recorded a jump	
Shot put	S. Bori (RUS)	11.00	Hu Zunli (CHN)	10.14	Liu Tingting (CHN)	8.79
Discus throw	Li Yingli (CHN)	50.47	Hu Zunli (CHN)	26.73	Wong Wai San (MAC)	21.75
Hammer throw	Leung Yee Mei (HKG)	48.44	Galina Sharipova (TJK)	38.85	Purev Maamuu (MGL)	37.37
Javelin throw	Liu Chunmei (CHN)	48.75	Suwanna Phetkongtong (THA)	44.50	He Haixia (CHN)	42.50
Heptathlon	Shao Jiexia (CHN)	4930 pts	Chen Xiaojuan (CHN)	4210 pts	E. Minaeva (RUS)	4201 pts
