= Anguilla at the 2026 Commonwealth Games =

- Flag of Anguilla
- CG code: AIA
- CGA: Anguilla Commonwealth Games Association
- Website: facebook.com/AnguillaCommonwealthGamesAssociation (Facebook)

in Glasgow, Scotland 23 July 2026 – 2 August 2026
- Competitors: 10 in 3 sports
- Flag bearer: Tri-tania Lowe
- Baton bearer: Jonathan Irizarry
- Medals: Gold 0 Silver 0 Bronze 0 Total 0

Commonwealth Games appearances (overview)
- 1998; 2002; 2006; 2010; 2014; 2018; 2022; 2026; 2030

Other related appearances
- Saint Christopher-Nevis-Anguilla (1978)

Anguilla competed at the 2026 Commonwealth Games in Glasgow, Scotland. This marked Anguilla's 8th participation at the games, after making its debut at the 1998 Commonwealth Games.

The King's Baton relay stopped in Anguilla in May 2025.

The Anguillan team of ten athletes competing in three sports was officially named on July 3, 2026. Athlete Tri-tania Lowe was the country's flagbearer during the opening ceremony. Meanwhile, fellow athlete Jonathan Irizarry was the baton bearer during the opening ceremony.

== Competitors ==
The following is the list of number of competitors participating at the Games per sport/discipline.

Sport	Men	Women	Total
Athletics	4	2	6
Swimming	2	1	3
Track cycling	1	0	1
Total	7	3	10

== Athletics ==
Anguilla entered six athletes (four men and two women).

Key

- Q = Qualified for the next round
- q = Qualified for the next round as a fastest loser or, in field events, by position without achieving the qualifying target

Athlete	Event	Heat		Semifinal		Final	
Athlete	Event	Result	Rank	Result	Rank	Result	Rank
Saymon Rijo	Men's 100 metres	11.42	45	Did not advance			
Saymon Rijo	Men's 200 metres	Did not start					
Trenton Brooks	Men's 100 metres	10.67	68	Did not advance			
Trenton Brooks	Men's 200 metres	21.50	36	Did not advance			
Tri-Tania Lowe	Women's 100 metres	11.87	5	Did not advance			
Sage Connor	Women's 100 metres	12.41	7	Did not advance			
Sage Connor	Women's 200 metres	Did not start					

Field

Athlete	Event	Semifinal		Final	
Athlete	Event	Result	Rank	Result	Rank
Johniff Gumbs	Men's long jump	7.11	16	Did not advance	
Johniff Gumbs	Men's high jump	No mark			
J'Quan Samuels	Men's high jump	—N/a		2.00	12

== Swimming ==
Anguilla entered three swimmers (two men and one woman).

Athlete	Event	Heat		Semifinal		Final	
Athlete	Event	Time	Rank	Time	Rank	Time	Rank
Josiah Minott	Men's 50 metre freestyle	31.87	67	Did not Advance			
Josiah Minott	Men's 50 m breaststroke	42.33	57	Did not Advance			
Josiah Minott	Men's 100 m freestyle	1:17.57	67	Did not Advance			
Jonathan Irizarry	Men's 50 m freestyle	34.92	68	Did not Advance			
Jonathan Irizarry	Men's 50 m breaststroke	44.37	58	Did not Advance			
Jonathan Irizarry	Men's 50 m butterfly	39.05	70	Did not Advance			
Kayleigh Vanterpool	Women's 50 m backstroke	45.72	40	Did not Advance			
Kayleigh Vanterpool	Women's 50 m freestyle	39.29	66	Did not Advance			
Kayleigh Vanterpool	Women's 100 m freestyle	1:35.55	64	Did not Advance			

== Track cycling ==
Anguilla entered one male track cyclist. This marked the country's debut appearance in the discipline.

Elimination race

Athlete	Event	Final
Athlete	Event	Rank
Delroy Carter	Men's elimination race	23

Points race

Athlete	Event	Qualification		Final	
Athlete	Event	Points	Rank	Points	Rank
Delroy Carter	Men's point race	DNF		Did not advance	

Scratch race

Athlete	Event	Qualification	Final
Athlete	Event	Rank	Rank
Delroy Carter	Men's scratch race	DNF	Did not advance
