= Beatrice Marscheck =

German long jumper

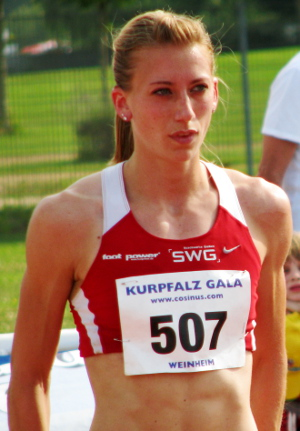
Beatrice Marscheck, 2012.

Beatrice Marscheck (born 23 September 1985) is a retired German long jumper.

She finished seventh at the 2009 Summer Universiade and competed at the 2009 World Championships without reaching the final.

Her personal best is 6.73 metres, achieved in June 2009 in Wesel. She represented the club LAZ Gießen.
