= Anguilla at the 1983 World Championships in Athletics =

- Flag of Anguilla
- WA code: AIA

in Helsinki, Finland August 7–14, 1983
- Competitors: 1 (1 man) in 2 events
- Medals: Gold 0 Silver 0 Bronze 0 Total 0

World Championships in Athletics appearances (overview)
- 1983; 1987; 1991; 1993; 1995; 1997; 1999; 2001; 2003; 2005; 2007; 2009; 2011; 2013; 2015; 2017; 2019; 2022; 2023; 2025

Anguilla competed at the 1983 World Championships in Athletics in Helsinki, Finland, which were held from 7 to 14 August 1983. The athlete delegation consisted of one athlete, sprinter Trevor Davis. He competed in the men's 100 metres and men's 200 metres though failed to advance past the qualifying heats of both events.

== Background ==
The 1983 World Championships in Athletics were held at the Helsinki Olympic Stadium in Helsinki, Finland. Under the auspices of the International Amateur Athletics Federation, this was the first edition of the World Championships. It was held from 7 to 14 August 1983 and had 41 different events. Among the competing teams was the territory of Anguilla. For this edition of the World Championships in Athletics, sprinter Trevor Davis competed for the territory. He competed in the men's 100 metres and men's 200 metres.

== Men ==
David first competed in the qualifying heats of the men's 100 metres on 7 August in the seventh heat against seven other competitors. There, he recorded a time of 11.53 seconds and placed last, failing to advance further to the quarterfinals as only the top three of each heat and the next five fastest athletes would be able to do so. He then competed in the qualifying heats of the men's 200 metres six days later in the sixth heat against six other competitors. There, he recorded a time of 22.80 seconds and again placed last, failing to advance further to the quarterfinals as only the top three of each heat and the next eight fastest athletes would be able to do so.

Track and road events

Athlete	Event	Heat		Quarterfinal		Semifinal		Final	
Athlete	Event	Result	Rank	Result	Rank	Result	Rank	Result	Rank
Trevor Davis	100 metres	11.53	8	Did not advance					
Trevor Davis	200 metres	22.80	7	Did not advance					
