= List of Anguillan records in athletics =

The following are the national records in athletics in Anguilla maintained by its national athletics federation: Anguilla Amateur Athletic Federation (AAAF).

== Outdoor ==
Key to tables: Awaiting ratification Record not kept by AAAF Not ratified or later rescinded by AAAF

=== Men ===
Event	Record	Athlete	Date	Meet	Place	Ref.	Video
60 m	7.03 (+0.2 m/s)	Davin Fleming	27 January 2024	Queen's/Grace Jackson Meet	Kingston, Jamaica		
100 m	10.12 (+1.3 m/s)	Zharnel Hughes	28 March 2014	ISSA Championships	Kingston, Jamaica		
200 m	20.15 (±0.0 m/s)	Zharnel Hughes	16 May 2015	Cayman Invitational	Georgetown, Cayman Islands		
400 m	47.29	Kirthley Richardson	19 May 1995		Odessa, United States		
800 m	1:52.17	Vernal Gumbs	28 July 1989		San Juan, Puerto Rico		
1500 m	4:18.0 h	Nigel Richardson	5 July 1984		St. John's, Antigua and Barbuda		
3000 m							
5000 m	16:45.79	Michael Gumbs	23 April 2000	CARIFTA Games	St. George's, Grenada		
10,000 m							
Marathon							
110 m hurdles	18.70	Andre Samuel	11 May 2001		Buffalo, United States		
400 m hurdles	55.95	Kithley Richardson	1 May 1999		Stillwater, United States		
3000 m steeplechase							
High jump	2.00 m	Theron Niles	6 July 2014	OECS Championships	Basseterre, Saint Kitts and Nevis		
Pole vault	3.21 m	Andre Samuel	27 April 2002		Cobleskill, United States		
Long jump	6.96 m	Denvil Ruan	23 April 2011	MSU Legacy	Baltimore, United States		
Long jump	7.11 m (+2.0 m/s)	Joseph Pemberton	14 July 2006		Port of Spain, Trinidad and Tobago		
Triple jump	14.93 m (−0.2 m/s)	Denvil Ruan	4 May 2013	MEAC Track & Field Championships	Greensboro, North Carolina, United States		
Shot put	8.99 m	Tashim Fleming	14 February 2015		The Valley, Anguillia		
Discus throw	35.39 m	Andre Samuel	27 April 2002		Cobleskill, United States		
Hammer throw							
Javelin throw	62.58 m	Samek Connor	21 May 2009		Edwardsville, United States		
Decathlon	5313 pts	Andre Samuel	9–10 May 2002		Uniondale, United States		
Decathlon	100m / Long jump / Shot put / High jump / 400m / 110m H / Discus / Pole vault / Javelin / 1500m						
20 km walk (road)							
50 km walk (road)							
4 × 100 m relay	42.5 h	Anguilla	6 July 1991		Road Town, British Virgin Islands		
4 × 400 m relay	3:24.3 h	Anguilla	5 July 1992		Road Town, British Virgin Islands		

=== Women ===
Event	Record	Athlete	Date	Meet	Place	Ref.
100 m	11.98	Desiree Cocks	8 May 1998		St. Louis, United States	
200 m	24.53 (−0.2 m/s)	Artesha Richardson	13 May 2017	Conference Championships	El Paso, United States	
400 m	55.41	Artesha Richardson	13 May 2017	Conference Championships	El Paso, United States	
800 m	2:19.72	Jonicia Richardson	21 April 2014	CARIFTA Games	Fort-de-France, Martinique	
1500 m	5:16.2 h	Julie Lake	21 April 1990	CARIFTA Games	Kingston, Jamaica	
1500 m	5:12.02 Mx	Myisha L'etang	18 April 2015		Saint Martin	
3000 m	11:38.21	Jonicia Richardson	29 June 2008		Road Town, British Virgin Islands	
5000 m						
10,000 m						
Marathon						
100 m hurdles	14.97 (+0.8 m/s) (Note: record set during heptathlon competition)	Dee-Anne Rogers	10 July 2013	Universiade	Kazan, Russia	
400 m hurdles						
3000 m steeplechase						
High jump	1.77 m	Shinelle Proctor	31 May 2014	NCAA West Preliminary Round	Fayetteville, United States	
Pole vault						
Long jump	6.71 m (+1.2 m/s)	Shara Proctor	23 August 2009	World Championships	Berlin, Germany	
Triple jump	13.74 m (+0.6 m/s)	Shara Proctor	30 May 2009		Greensboro, United States	
Shot put	9.27 m	Dee-Ann Rogers	29 July 2014		Glasgow, Great Britain	
Shot put	11.88 m	Andrie Curiel-Connor	15 June 2019	44th North West Miami Classic	Miramar, United States	
Discus throw	28.55 m	Shara Proctor	2 July 2006		St. John's, Antigua and Barbuda	
Hammer throw						
Javelin throw	28.10 m	Melissa Mussington	21 February 2009		The Valley, Anguilla	
Heptathlon	4464 pts	Dee-Anne Rogers	10–11 July 2013	Universiade	Kazan, Russia	
Heptathlon	100m H / High jump / Shot put / 200m / Long jump / Javelin / 800m; 14.97 (+0.8 m/s) / 1.62 m / 7.83 m / 25.91 (−0.2 m/s) / 5.52 m (+0.7 m/s) / 21.18 m / 2:33.52					
20 km walk (road)						
50 km walk (road)						
4 × 100 m relay	50.33	Anguilla; Angelena Gumbs; Nicole Gumbs; Rechelle Meade; Donila Reid	9 June 2012		Tortola, British Virgin Islands	
4 × 400 m relay	3:53.02 (Note: 4:05.65 by World Athletics source, probably false)	Anguilla; Artesha Richardson; Janique Fleming; Myisha Letang; T-kailah Richardson	7 April 2015	CARIFTA Games	Basseterre, Saint Kitts and Nevis	

== Indoor ==
=== Men ===
Event	Record	Athlete	Date	Meet	Place	Ref.
55 m	6.67	Mauriel Carty	3 February 2018	Annual DeSchriver Invitational	East Stroudsburg, United States	
60 m	7.04	Kieron Rogers	9 March 2012	World Championships	Istanbul, Turkey	
200 m	21.84	Mauriel Carty	11 February 2017	David Hemery Valentine Invitational	Boston, United States	
400 m						
800 m						
1500 m						
3000 m						
60 m hurdles						
High jump						
Pole vault						
Long jump	7.01 m	Denvil Ruan	7 January 2012	UMES Coach O College Invitational	Baltimore, United States	
Triple jump	14.70 m	Denvil Ruan	25 January 2013	NYRR College Night at the Armory II	New York City, United States	
Shot put						
Heptathlon						
Heptathlon	60m / Long jump / Shot put / High jump / 60m H / Pole vault / 1000m					
5000 m walk						
4 × 400 m relay						

=== Women ===
Event	Record	Athlete	Date	Meet	Place	Ref.
60 m	7.72	Shara Proctor	17 January 2009	Kentucky Invitational	Lexington, United States	
200 m	24.96 A	Artesha Richardson	19 January 2019	Dr. Martin Luther King Jr. Collegiate Invitational	Albuquerque, United States	
400 m	56.06	Artesha Richardson	18 February 2017		Birmingham, United States	
800 m						
1500 m						
3000 m						
60 m hurdles	9.39 m	Dee-Ann Kentish-Rogers	21 February 2014	BUCS Championships	Sheffield, Great Britain	
High jump	1.72 m	Shinelle Proctor	24 January 2014	Rod McCravy Memorial	Lexington, United States	
Pole vault						
Long jump	6.67 m	Shara Proctor	5 February 2010	Virginia Tech Elite	Blacksburg, United States	
Triple jump	13.88 m	Shara Proctor	6 February 2010	Virginia Tech Elite	Blacksburg, United States	
Shot put	8.52 m	Dee-Ann Kentish-Rogers	20 February 2015	BUCS Championships	Sheffield, Great Britain	
Pentathlon						
Pentathlon	60m H / High jump / Shot put / Long jump / 800m					
3000 m walk						
4 × 400 m relay						
