= Anguilla at the 2022 Commonwealth Games =

- Flag of Anguilla
- CG code: AIA
- CGA: Anguilla Commonwealth Games Association
- Website: facebook.com/AnguillaCommonwealthGamesAssociation (Facebook)

in Birmingham, England 28 July 2022 – 8 August 2022
- Competitors: 11 (10 men and 1 woman) in 4 sports
- Flag bearers: Hasani Hennis; Tri-Tania Lowe
- Medals: Gold 0 Silver 0 Bronze 0 Total 0

Commonwealth Games appearances (overview)
- 1998; 2002; 2006; 2010; 2014; 2018; 2022; 2026; 2030

Other related appearances
- Saint Christopher-Nevis-Anguilla (1978)

Anguilla was represented at the 2022 Commonwealth Games in Birmingham, England, United Kingdom by the Anguilla Commonwealth Games Association.

In total, 11 athletes including 10 men and one woman represented Anguilla in four different sports including athletics, boxing, cycling and swimming.

== Competitors ==
In total, 11 athletes represented Anguilla at the 2022 Commonwealth Games in Birmingham, England, United Kingdom across four different sports.

Sport	Men	Women	Total
Athletics	3	1	4
Boxing	2	0	2
Cycling	4	0	4
Swimming	1	0	1
Total	10	1	11

== Athletics ==
In total, four Anguillan athletes participated in the athletics events – Davin Fleming and Terrone Webster in the men's 100 m, Saymon Rijo in the men's 200 m and Tri-Tania Lowe in the women's 100 m.

The athletics events took place at Alexander Stadium in Perry Bar, Birmingham between 30 July and 7 August 2022.

Men

Athlete	Event	Heat		Semifinal		Final	
Athlete	Event	Result	Rank	Result	Rank	Result	Rank
Davin Fleming	100 m	11.09	7	Did not advance			
Terrone Webster	100 m	11.13	7	Did not advance			
Saymon Rijo	200 m	22.66	6	Did not advance			

Women

Athlete	Event	Heat		Semifinal		Final	
Athlete	Event	Result	Rank	Result	Rank	Result	Rank
Tri-Tania Lowe	100 m	12.11	6	Did not advance			

== Boxing ==
In total, two Anguillan athletes participated in the boxing events – Japheth Olton in the men's heavyweight category and Curlun Richardson in the men's light heavyweight category.

The boxing events took place at National Exhibition Centre (NEC) in Marston Green between 29 July and 7 August 2022.

Athlete	Event	Round of 32	Round of 16	Quarterfinals	Semifinals	Final	
Athlete	Event	Opposition Result	Opposition Result	Opposition Result	Opposition Result	Opposition Result	Rank
Curlun Richardson	Light heavyweight	Bye	Changalawe (TAN); L 0–5	Did not advance			
Japheth Olton	Heavyweight	—N/a	Bye	Coumi (AUS); L RSC	Did not advance		

== Cycling ==
In total, four Anguillan athletes participated in the cycling events – Delroy Carty and Hasani Hennis in the men's road race and the men's time trial and Danny Laud and Zambezi Ricardson in the men's road race.

The men's road race took place at Myton Fields in Warwick on 7 August 2022. The men's time trial took place at West Park in Wolverhampton on 4 August 2022.

Athlete	Event	Time	Rank
Delroy Carty	Road race	—N/a	DNF
Hasani Hennis	Road race	3:39:10	70
Danny Laud	Road race	—N/a	DNF
Zambezi Ricardson	Road race	—N/a	DNF
Delroy Carty	Time trial	1:02:29.71	45
Hasani Hennis	Time trial	55:18.18	35

== Swimming ==
In total, one Anguillan athlete participated in the swimming events – Alex Lake in the men's 50 m freestyle, the men's 100 m freestyle, the men's 50 m backstroke, the men's 50 m breaststroke and the men's 100 m breaststroke.

The swimming events took place at the Sandwell Aquatics Centre in Londonderry, Smethwick between 29 July and 3 August 2022.

Athlete	Event	Heat		Semifinal		Final	
Athlete	Event	Time	Rank	Time	Rank	Time	Rank
Alex Lake	50 m freestyle	27.16	62	Did not advance			
Alex Lake	100 m freestyle	1:00.36	66	did not advance			
Alex Lake	50 m backstroke	31.06	42	did not advance			
Alex Lake	50 m breaststroke	35.72	39	Did not advance			
Alex Lake	100 m breaststroke	1:19.00	36	did not advance			
