= Anguilla at the 2006 Commonwealth Games =

- CG code: ANG
- CGA: Commonwealth Games Association of Anguilla

in Melbourne, Australia
- Competitors: 6 (4 Men, 2 Woman) in 2 sports
- Flag bearers: Opening: Closing:
- Medals: Gold 0 Silver 0 Bronze 0 Total 0

Commonwealth Games appearances (overview)
- 1998; 2002; 2006; 2010; 2014; 2018; 2022; 2026; 2030

In only their third Games the British overseas territory of Anguilla was represented at the 2006 Commonwealth Games in Melbourne by a six-member contingent, comprising six sportspersons and no officials. They competed in five events in cycling and athletics. They won no medals.

== Competitors ==
The following is the list of number of competitors participating in the Games.

Sport	Men	Women	Total
Athletics	0	2	2
Cycling	4	0	4
Total	4	2	6

== Athletics ==
Women
Track

Athlete	Events	Heat		Semi-final		Final	
Athlete	Events	Result	Rank	Result	Rank	Result	Rank
Curlee Gumbs	100 m	12.73	5	Did not advance			
Curlee Gumbs	200 m	DNS		Did not advance			

Field

Athlete	Events	Qualification		Final	
Athlete	Events	Result	Rank	Result	Rank
Shara Proctor	Long jump	6.06	13	Did not advance	

Key

- Note–Ranks given for track events are within the athlete's heat only

== Cycling ==
=== Road ===
Men

Athlete	Event	Time	Rank
Charles Bryan	Road race	DNF	
Charles Bryan	Time trial	59:33.11	41
Ronnie Bryan	Road race	DNF	
Ronnie Bryan	Time trial	1:01:25.57	50
Danny Lloyd Laud	Road race	DNF	
Kris Pradel	Road race	DNF	
Kris Pradel	Time trial	59:35.90	42
