= Turkey at the 2009 World Championships in Athletics =

- WA code: TUR

in Berlin
- Competitors: 9(3 men/6 women) in 10 sports
- Medals Ranked 33rd: Gold 0 Silver 0 Bronze 1 Total 1

World Championships in Athletics appearances (overview)
- 1983; 1987; 1991; 1993; 1995; 1997; 1999; 2001; 2003; 2005; 2007; 2009; 2011; 2013; 2015; 2017; 2019; 2022; 2023; 2025

Turkey competes at the 2009 World Championships in Athletics from 15 to 23 August in Berlin. A team of 12 athletes was announced in preparation for the competition.

== Medalists ==
| Medal | Athlete | Event | Date |
|---|---|---|---|
| Bronze | Karin Melis Mey | Women's long jump | August 23 |

== Team selection ==
| Event | Athlete | |
| Event | Men | Women |
|---|---|---|
| Discus Throw | Ercüment Olgundeniz | |
| Hammer throw | Eşref Apak | |
| Javelin throw | Fatih Avan | |
| 10,000 metres | | Elvan Abeylegesse |
| 5000 metres | | Elvan Abeylegesse; Alemitu Bekele |
| 3000 m steeplechase | | Aslı Çakır |
| 1500 meters | | Alemitu Bekele; Aslı Çakır |
| 800 meters | | Yeliz Kurt |
| 100 meter hurdles | | Nevin Yanit |
| Long jump | | Karin Mey Melis |

== Results ==
=== Men ===
Field events

| Event | Athletes | Qualification | | Final | |
| Event | Athletes | Result | Rank | Result | Rank |
|---|---|---|---|---|---|
| Discus throw | Ercüment Olgundeniz | 57.52 | 29 | Did not advance | |
| Hammer throw | Eşref Apak | 70.70 | 27 | Did not advance | |
| Javelin throw | Fatih Avan | 78.12 | 19 | Did not advance | |

=== Women ===
Track and road events

| Event | Athletes | Heat Round 1 | | Heat Round 2 | | Semifinal | | Final | |
| Event | Athletes | Result | Rank | Result | Rank | Result | Rank | Result | Rank |
|---|---|---|---|---|---|---|---|---|---|
| 10,000 metres | Elvan Abeylegesse | - | - | - | - | - | - | Did not finish | |
| 5000 metres | Elvan Abeylegesse | - | - | - | - | - | - | Did not start | |
| 5000 metres | Alemitu Bekele | 15:19.88 | 5 | - | - | - | - | 15:18.18 SB | 13 |
| 3000 m steeplechase | Aslı Çakır | 10:06.64 | 41 | - | - | - | - | Did not advance | |
| 1500 m | Alemitu Bekele | 4:13.69 | 33 | - | - | - | - | Did not advance | |
| 1500 m | Aslı Çakır | - | - | - | - | - | - | Did not start | |
| 800 m | Yeliz Kurt | 2:13.42 | 39 | - | - | - | - | Did not advance | |
| 100 m hurdles | Nevin Yanit | 12.92 | 3 | 12.99 | 15 | - | - | Did not advance | |

Field and combined events

| Event | Athletes | Qualification | | Final | |
| Event | Athletes | Result | Rank | Result | Rank |
|---|---|---|---|---|---|
| Long jump | Karin Mey Melis | 6.67 | 4 | 6.80 | 2nd place, silver medalist(s) |
