= Teresa Dobija =

Polish long jumper

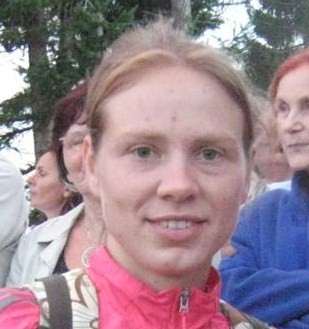
Teresa Dobija in 2010.

Teresa Dobija (born 9 October 1982 in Bielsko-Biała) is a Polish athlete specialising in the long jump. She competed at the 2009 World Championships placing tenth in the final.

She has personal bests of 6.78 metres outdoors (2011) and 6.50 metres indoors (2011).

== Competition record ==
Year	Competition	Venue	Position	Notes
Representing Poland
1999	World Youth Championships	Bydgoszcz, Poland	8th	5.75 m
2009	Universiade	Belgrade, Serbia	4th	6.38 m
2009	World Championships	Berlin, Germany	10th	6.58 m
2011	World Championships	Daegu, South Korea	22nd (q)	6.30 m
2012	European Championships	Helsinki, Finland	14th (q)	6.36 m
2013	Jeux de la Francophonie	Nice, France	2nd	6.66 m
2014	World Indoor Championships	Sopot, Poland	6th	6.52 m
