= Athletics at the 2009 Summer Universiade – Women's long jump =

The women's long jump event at the 2009 Summer Universiade was held on 7–8 July.

== Medalists ==
Gold	Silver	Bronze
Ivana Španović; Serbia	Irina Kryachkova; Russia	Ruky Abdulai; Canada

== Results ==
=== Qualification ===
Qualification: 6.20 m (Q) or at least 12 best (q) qualified for the final.

Rank	Group	Athlete	Nationality	#1	#2	#3	Result	Notes
1	A	Ruky Abdulai	Canada	6.51			6.51	Q
2	B	Teresa Dobija	Poland	6.48			6.48	Q
3	B	Ivana Španović	Serbia	6.42			6.42	Q
4	A	Tania Vincenzino	Italy	6.40			6.40	Q
5	A	Sarah Nambawa	Uganda	6.32			6.32	Q
6	B	Jacinta Boyd	Australia	6.17	6.25		6.25	Q
7	B	Chen Yaling	China	6.25			6.25	Q
8	B	Irina Kryachkova	Russia	6.13	6.24		6.24	Q
9	B	Cornelia Deiac	Romania	x	6.20		6.20	Q
10	A	Beatrice Marscheck	Germany	6.18	6.05	6.17	6.18	q
11	A	Liu Xiao	China	6.15	6.10	x	6.15	q
12	A	Yoshimi Sato	Japan	5.61	5.89	6.15	6.15	q
13	A	Eleni Kafourou	Greece	6.12	x	x	6.12	
14	B	Lina Andrijauskaitė	Lithuania	6.05	5.76	x	6.05	
15	B	Lauma Grīva	Latvia	x	6.04	x	6.04	
16	B	Marina Pankova	Russia	6.00	x	5.97	6.00	
17	A	Veranika Shutkova	Belarus	x	5.87	5.99	5.99	
18	B	Kristina Damyanova	Bulgaria	5.86	5.86	5.91	5.91	
19	A	Mara Grīva	Latvia	5.79	5.62	5.83	5.83	
20	A	Thitima Muangjan	Thailand	5.74	x	5.43	5.74	
21	A	Milena Milašević	Montenegro	5.74	x	x	5.74	
22	A	Lorena Mina	Ecuador	5.57	x	x	5.57	
23	B	Vasiliki Antonetsi	Greece	5.46	5.48	5.50	5.50	
24	A	Cindy Sibaja	Costa Rica	5.30	x	4.87	5.30	
	A	Ivana Rožman	Macedonia				DNS	
	B	Euphemia Edem	Nigeria				DNS	
	B	Nina Kolarič	Slovenia				DNS	
	B	Jana Korešová	Czech Republic				DNS	

=== Final ===
Rank	Athlete	Nationality	#1	#2	#3	#4	#5	#6	Result	Notes
1st place, gold medalist(s)	Ivana Španović	Serbia	6.41	6.52	6.47	6.52	6.64	6.17	6.64	
2nd place, silver medalist(s)	Irina Kryachkova	Russia	6.47	x	6.35	5.58	6.31	6.21	6.47	
3rd place, bronze medalist(s)	Ruky Abdulai	Canada	6.44	6.43	x	–	–	–	6.44	
4	Teresa Dobija	Poland	6.31	6.38	6.28	6.30	x	x	6.38	
5	Jacinta Boyd	Australia	6.17	6.38	6.11	x	6.20	6.22	6.38	
6	Chen Yaling	China	6.32	x	6.16	5.88	–	–	6.32	
7	Beatrice Marscheck	Germany	6.14	6.04	6.13	6.04	6.20	6.00	6.20	
8	Liu Xiao	China	6.02	6.04	6.15	6.08	–	–	6.15	
9	Tania Vincenzino	Italy	5.71	6.13	6.04				6.13	
10	Yoshimi Sato	Japan	6.10	5.92	6.07				6.10	
11	Sarah Nambawa	Uganda	6.06	5.74	5.68				6.06	
12	Cornelia Deiac	Romania	5.98	5.95	6.05				6.05	
