= Ruky Abdulai =

Canadian long jumper and heptathlete

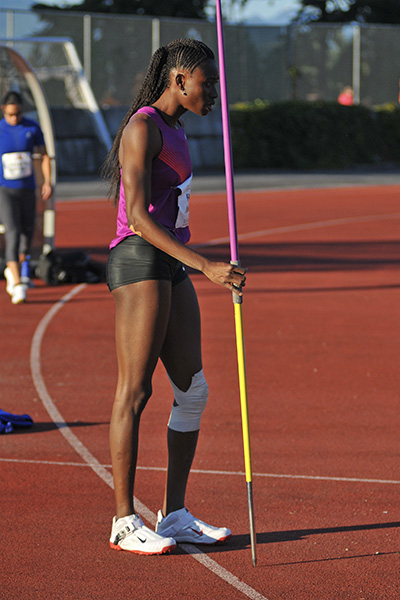

Personal information
- Full name: Rukayatu Abdulai
- Nationality: Canada
- Born: 8 August 1985 (age 40) Accra, Ghana
- Height: 1.80 m (5 ft 11 in)
- Weight: 85 kg (187 lb)

Sport
- Sport: Athletics
- Events: Long jump, heptathlon
- College team: Simon Fraser Red Leafs

Achievements and titles
- Personal bests: Long jump: 6.74 m (2008); Heptathlon: 6,212 points (2011)
Medal record
Women's athletics
Representing Canada
Universiade
| Bronze medal – third place | 2009 Belgrade | Long jump |

Rukayatu "Ruky" Abdulai (born 8 August 1985 in Accra, Ghana) is a Canadian long jumper and heptathlete, who holds a dual citizenship with Ghana. She won the bronze medal for the long jump at the 2009 Summer Universiade in Belgrade, Serbia, with an astonishing mark of 6.44 metres.

Abdulai, a native of Accra, Ghana, attended on a track and field scholarship at Simon Fraser University in Burnaby, British Columbia. In early 2008, she adopted a Canadian nationality in order to compete internationally for the long jump. She set a national record of 6.72 metres at the Azusa Pacific Invitational in California, and had won long jumps at numerous indoor and outdoor national collegiate championships. Abdulai failed to reach an Olympic standard of 6.70 metres at the Harry Jerome International Track Classic in Vancouver, after attaining her best mark at 6.49 metres. However, she was given another shot for the Olympics by claiming her first-ever national title in the long jump at the Canadian Track and Field Championships in Windsor, Ontario.

At the 2008 Summer Olympics in Beijing, Abdulai competed for the women's long jump, along with her teammate Tabia Charles. She jumped outside her personal best of 6.41 metres in the qualifying rounds, placing twenty-sixth in the overall rankings. She was eventually elevated to a single higher position, when Ukraine's Lyudmila Blonska stripped of her silver medal after being tested positive for methyltestosterone.

At the 2009 Summer Universiade in Belgrade, Serbia, Abdulai won the bronze medal in the long jump, with her best possible mark of 6.44 metres.

In 2010, Abdulai turned her attention to heptathlon by surprisingly winning her first international-level attempt at Mount Sac Relays in California, with a solid score of 6,086 points. The following year, she upset Jessica Zelinka by eighteen points at the national trials, with an A-standard score of 6,150.

Abdulai made her official debut for the women's heptathlon at the 2011 IAAF World Championships in Daegu, South Korea, along with her teammate Zelinka, who finished behind her at the national trials. She scored personal bests in the 100 m hurdles (13.60 seconds), shot put (11.72 m), and 800 metres (2:15.29), and a single seasonal best in the high jump (1.80 m), for an outstanding total of 6,212 points, finishing well in thirteenth place.
