= Shinelle Proctor =

Anguillian sprinter

Personal information
- Nationality: Anguillian
- Born: 27 June 1991 (age 34) The Valley, Anguilla

Sport
- Sport: Track and field
- Event: 60m

Shinelle Proctor (born 27 June 1991) is an Anguillan sprinter and high jumper. She competed in the 60 metres event at the 2014 IAAF World Indoor Championships. Her older sister is the Anguillian long-jumper Shara Proctor.

== Athletics career ==
Proctor competed in the 60 metre indoor and 100 metre outdoor sprints, triple jump and high jump. She holds the national high jump record for Anguilla and won a bronze medal at the 2009 CARIFTA Games. In 2010, she was part of a three person team representing Anguilla at the 2010 CARIFTA Games, alongside sprinter Zharnel Hughes and long jumper Ricio Welch. The next year, Proctor competed in the 2011 World Championships in Athletics in South Korea. She competed in the 100 metres, however she did not make it out of her heat, finishing fourth in Heat 1. Switching disciplines again, she competed in the high jump for Anguilla at the Commonwealth Games in the 2014 Games in Glasgow, Scotland. She finished joint-last in the qualifying round. Proctor also competed at the 2014 IAAF World Indoor Championships in the 60 metre but failed to get out of the heat.

== Personal life ==
Proctor was born in The Valley, Anguilla. She is the sister of long jumper Shara Proctor, who has represented Anguilla, Great Britain and England. Proctor underwent secondary schooling at Albena Lake-Hodge Comprehensive School in The Valley and then attended university in the United States at the University of Illinois on an athletics scholarship. In 2012, she transferred to the University of Missouri in order to gain her degree in Parks Recreation and Tourism.
