= Liu Xiao (long jumper) =

Chinese long jumper

Liu Xiao (simplified Chinese: 刘晓; traditional Chinese: 劉曉), listed by World Athletics as Xiao Liu, is a Chinese track and field athlete who specialised in the long jump. She attained China's national elite-athlete standard in the event and represented China at three consecutive Summer Universiades between 2007 and 2011. She reached the women's long jump final at the 2009 Summer Universiade, placing eighth with a mark of 6.15 metres.

World Athletics lists Liu's long jump personal best as 6.45 metres, achieved in Nanjing on 22 February 2011. Peking University separately documented a higher mark of 6.49 metres in May 2011, when she broke the Beijing collegiate women's long jump record.

== Athletics career ==
Liu competed for Peking University while studying sociology. A 2009 university profile identified her as a sociology student-athlete combining academic study with high-level athletics; Peking University later identified her as a graduate student in its Department of Sociology.

In July 2007, Liu finished second in the women's long jump at the eighth National University Games of China with a mark of 6.30 metres. Later that year, she represented China in the women's long jump at the 2007 Summer Universiade.

In November 2008, Liu was runner-up in the women's long jump at the National Athletics Grand Prix final in Zhaoqing.

At the 2009 Summer Universiade in Belgrade, Liu advanced to the women's long jump final. She finished eighth with a best jump of 6.15 metres.

In March 2010, Liu won the women's long jump at the opening meeting of the Chinese indoor season in Beijing, recording an indoor best of 6.30 metres. At the Capital Universities Student Athletics Games two months later, she attained China's national elite-athlete standard in both the long jump and triple jump. Peking University had more athletes attain the standard than any other university at the competition.

In August 2010, Liu placed third in the women's long jump at the Chinese Athletics Championships with a mark of 6.28 metres, behind Lu Minjia and Chen Yaling.

Liu's strongest documented performances came in 2011. World Athletics lists her 6.45-metre performance in Nanjing on 22 February as her personal best. In May, she jumped 6.49 metres at the 49th Capital Universities Student Athletics Games, breaking the Beijing collegiate women's long jump record. Later that year, she made her third Universiade appearance at the 2011 Summer Universiade in Shenzhen.

== Performance marks ==
World Athletics lists Liu's long jump personal best as 6.45 m, achieved in Nanjing on 22 February 2011. Peking University separately reported a higher performance of 6.49 m at the Capital Universities Student Athletics Games in May 2011, where the mark broke the Beijing collegiate women's long jump record.
