= Mauriel Carty =

Anguillan athlete and sprinter

Personal information
- Born: 29 May 1997 (age 29) The Valley, Anguilla
- Height: 1.85 m (6 ft 1 in)
- Weight: 79 kg (174 lb)

Sport
- Country: Anguilla
- Sport: Track and field
- Event: Sprinting
- Updated on 21 March 2025

Mauriel Carty (born 29 May 1997) is an Anguillan sprinter specializing in the 100 metres and 200 metres events. He has represented Anguilla in multiple international competitions, including the 2015 World Championships in Athletics and the 2022 Commonwealth Games.

== Early life and education ==
Carty was born in The Valley, to parents Maureen and Dave Carty, proprietors of a renowned barbecue restaurant in West End. He began sprinting in grade three at Alwyn Allison Richardson Primary School, where his talent was recognized by principal Arthur Egel and his father, Convert Carty. He continued his education at Albena Lake-Hodge Comprehensive School, representing Anguilla in competitions such as the Leeward Islands Junior Championships, Caribbean Union of Teachers Games, and the CARIFTA Games.

== Athletic career ==
At age 18, Carty competed in the 200 metres at the 2015 World Championships in Athletics in Beijing, China. Although he did not advance past the heats, his participation was notable for representing Anguilla on the global stage.

After relocating to the United States, he attended Kingsborough Community College in Brooklyn, New York, before transferring to Coppin State University in Baltimore, Maryland. At Coppin State, he earned a degree in Rehabilitation Services in 2022 and competed in the 100 m, 200 m, and 400 m events. He was named Sprinter of the Year during the 2021–2022 season and contributed to a bronze medal in the 4×100 m relay at the MEAC Championships.

== Recent competitions ==
In 2022, Carty represented Anguilla at the 2022 Commonwealth Games in Birmingham, competing in both the 100 metres and 200 metres events.

== Post-graduation ==
Following graduation, Carty undertook an internship providing therapeutic support to adolescents. This later led to a professional role at a youth-focused therapeutic services organisation.

== See also ==
- Anguilla at the 2015 World Championships in Athletics
