= Zharnel Hughes =

British sprinter (born 1995)

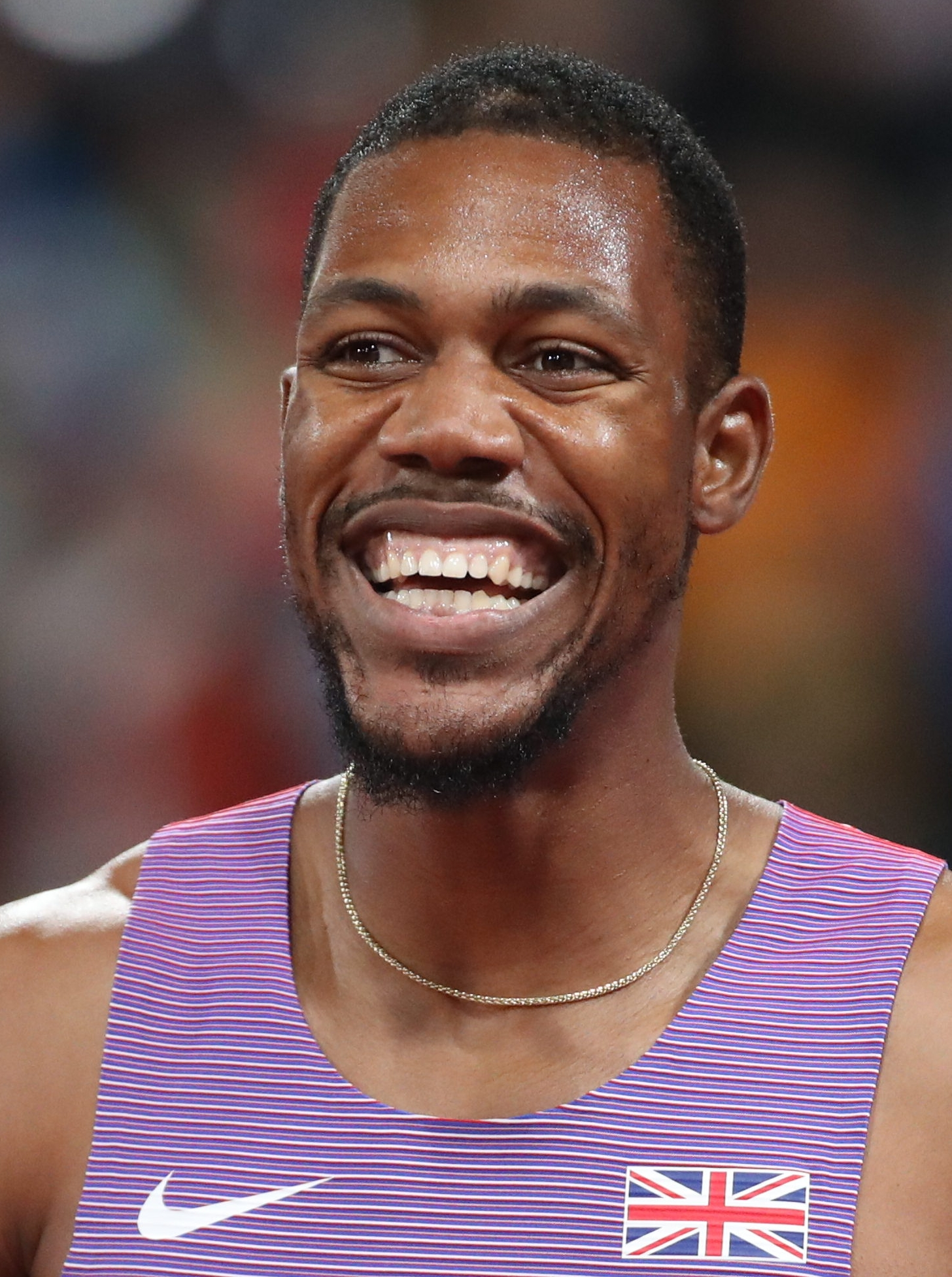
- Hughes at the 2022 European Championships

Personal information
- Nationality: British (English/Anguillan)
- Born: 13 July 1995 (age 31) The Valley, Anguilla
- Height: 1.90 m (6 ft 3 in)
- Weight: 82 kg (181 lb)

Sport
- Sport: Men's Athletics
- Event: Sprinting
- Club: Shaftesbury Barnet Harriers

Achievements and titles
- Personal bests: 100 m: 9.83s (2023) NR; 200 m: 19.73s (2023) NR; 400 m: 46.58s (2017)
Medal record
Men's athletics
Representing Great Britain
Olympic Games
Bronze medal – third place	2024 Paris	4 × 100 m relay
Disqualified	2020 Tokyo	4 × 100 m relay
World Championships
Silver medal – second place	2019 Doha	4 × 100 m relay
Bronze medal – third place	2022 Eugene	4 × 100 m relay
Bronze medal – third place	2023 Budapest	100 m
European Athletics Championships
Gold medal – first place	2018 Berlin	100 m
Gold medal – first place	2018 Berlin	4 × 100 m relay
Gold medal – first place	2022 Munich	200 m
Gold medal – first place	2022 Munich	4 × 100 m relay
Gold medal – first place	2026 Birmingham	4 × 100 m relay
Gold medal – first place	2026 Birmingham	4 × 100 m mixed relay
Silver medal – second place	2022 Munich	100 m
Silver medal – second place	2026 Birmingham	200 m
Representing Anguilla
Pan American Junior Championships
Gold medal – first place	2013 Medellín	100 m
CARIFTA Games (Junior)
Gold medal – first place	2013 Nassau	100 m
Bronze medal – third place	2012 Hamilton	100 m
CAC Junior Championships (Junior)
Gold medal – first place	2014 Morelia	200 m
CAC Junior Championships (Youth)
Gold medal – first place	2012 San Salvador	200 m
Silver medal – second place	2012 San Salvador	100 m
Representing England
Commonwealth Games
Gold medal – first place	2018 Gold Coast	4 × 100 m relay
Gold medal – first place	2022 Birmingham	4 × 100 m relay
Silver medal – second place	2022 Birmingham	200 m

Zharnel Hughes (born 13 July 1995) is a British sprinter who specialises in the 100 metres and 200 metres. Born and raised in the British Overseas Territory of Anguilla, he has competed internationally for Great Britain in the Olympic Games, World Athletics and European Athletics events, and for England at the Commonwealth Games, since 2015. A double Commonwealth Games (2018, 2022) and double European Championships (2018, 2022) gold medalist as part of the 4 × 100 metres relay, Hughes has twice been European champion individually; over 100 metres in 2018, and 200 metres in 2022. In 2023, he broke both British sprint records, before winning his first global individual medal, a bronze in the 100 metres at the 2023 World championships.

Hughes had significant success in his youth representing Anguilla, winning at the CARIFTA Games, Central American and Caribbean Junior Championships in Athletics and the Pan American Junior Athletics Championships. He holds the Anguillian national records in both 100 m and 200 m.

Following his transfer of allegiance Hughes placed fifth in the 200 m final at the 2015 World Championships in Athletics. Injury affected his 2016 and 2017 seasons and he was eliminated in the rounds-stage at the 2016 European Athletics Championships and 2017 World Championships in Athletics. He returned to fitness in 2018 and won the 4 × 100 metres relay title at the 2018 Commonwealth Games with England. Hughes crossed the line first in the final of the 200 metres at the Games, but was disqualified for impeding an athlete in the neighbouring lane.

He won in both the 100 metres and 4 × 100 metres relay at the 2018 European Championships, and in both the 200 metres and 4 × 100 metres relay at the 2022 European Championships representing Great Britain, and once more won in the 4 × 100 metres relay at the 2022 Commonwealth Games, again representing England. In 2019 he achieved his first global senior medal, a silver in the 4 × 100 metre relay at the 2019 World Athletics Championships. He achieved a second medal, a bronze, in the same event at the 2022 World Athletics Championships.

He was also part of the Great Britain team that finished second to Italy in the final of the 4 × 100 metres relay at the 2020 Summer Olympics. On 18 February 2022 it was announced that Hughes and his teammates CJ Ujah, Nethaneel Mitchell-Blake and Richard Kilty would be stripped of their 4 × 100 metres relay 2020 Summer Olympics second place after Court of Arbitration for Sport found Ujah guilty of a doping violation. Hughes won the bronze medal in the same event at the 2024 Summer Olympics, along with Mitchell-Blake and Kilty, in addition to debutants Jeremiah Azu and Louie Hinchliffe.

Hughes is the British record holder over 100 m and 200 m as well, with 9.83 s and 19.73 s respectively. He is equally the second fastest European in history over each of these distances, behind (two Italians) Marcell Jacobs (9.80s) and Pietro Mennea (19.72s) respectively.

Hughes trains with the Racers Track Club in Jamaica under coach Glen Mills, with clubmates including Usain Bolt, Yohan Blake and Delano Williams.

== Career ==
=== Youth career ===
Hughes was born in The Valley, Anguilla, where his mother worked as a housekeeper and his father as a taxi driver. His family is Jamaican on his mother's side and several of his relatives did sprinting at a low level. Hughes recognised his talent for the sport at the age of ten, when he won several races at a local school sports day where he ran for Orealia Kelly Primary School (formerly Stoney Ground Primary). He made his first international appearance for Anguilla at the 2010 CARIFTA Games at the age of fourteen, placing eighth in the 100 metres final. The following year he improved to sixth at the 2011 CARIFTA Games and made the final at the 2011 Commonwealth Youth Games, having his first runs under 11 seconds that year.

Hughes established himself in regional age category competitions in 2012, setting 100 m and 200 metres championship records at the 2012 Leeward Islands Junior Championships in Athletics, taking 100 m bronze at the 2012 CARIFTA Games, then a 100 m silver and 200 m gold at the 2012 Central American and Caribbean Junior Championships in Athletics. He was selected to represent Anguilla at the 2012 World Junior Championships in Athletics (his global debut) and was a semi-finalist in the short sprints, as well as setting a national record of 20.90 seconds. He ended that year with a personal best of 10.42 seconds for the 100 m.

He was awarded a scholarship in 2012 to attend the IAAF's Regional High Performance Training Centre in Jamaica and began to study at Kingston College. Soon after he had the opportunity to train with world record holder Usain Bolt. Hughes continued to progress in the 2013 season, winning 100 m gold at both the 2013 CARIFTA Games and the 2013 Pan American Junior Athletics Championships. He also made his first appearance in senior international competition at the 2013 Central American and Caribbean Championships in Athletics, reaching the final and recording a personal best of 10.23 seconds in the heats.

At the 2014 Inter-Secondary Schools Boys and Girls Championships he broke Yohan Blake's meet record for the 100 m with a time of 10.12 (Blake had earlier challenged training mate Hughes, saying he could not beat his time). He also recorded a new best of 20.32 seconds in the 200 m semi-finals but withdrew from the final due to an injury. This time ranked him as the number one under-20 athlete in the world that year. He focused on the 200 m the rest of that year, winning the 2014 Central American and Caribbean Junior Championships in Athletics in a championship record of 20.33, but falling short

=== Senior career ===
Following his successes in 2014, the question of his eligibility for the 2016 Summer Olympics arose, as Anguilla was not a nation recognised by the International Olympic Committee. As a resident of a British Overseas Territories, Hughes was eligible to compete for Team GB and, following in the footsteps of fellow Anguillian Shara Proctor, he ultimately confirmed in June 2015 that he would represent Great Britain in all World Athletics events. Hughes said "I have always known that if I was to run at the Olympics it would be in a British vest and that is how I have always dreamt it would be." The move received a mixed reaction from British athletes, with Richard Kilty saying that several national team members were unhappy with non-British-born athletes transferring to the team (thus increasing competition for funding). Former British sprinters Darren Campbell and Daniel Caines supported Hughes, noting that Britain was the home nation for people from its colonies.

He began his 2015 season with a new national record of 20.15 seconds for the 200 m in March, placing second to Anaso Jobodwana at the Cayman Invitational. Hughes made his Diamond League debut in June at the adidas Grand Prix in New York, where he was commended for almost beating world champion Usain Bolt. His first British national title win came at the 2015 British Athletics Championships at the start of July, gaining him selection for the 2015 World Championships in Athletics. Wins over 200 m at the London Grand Prix and Athletissima meets moved him to the top of the Diamond League rankings. His new best of 20.05 seconds at the London meet also made him Europe's top ranked sprinter. He improved further in the 200 metres World Championships final in Beijing, recording a time of 20.02 seconds to place fifth while his clubmate Usain Bolt defended his world title.

Hughes missed the 2016 Olympic Games in Rio due to a tear in his right knee ligament, sustained in a fall earlier in the season. He competed at the 2016 British Athletics Championships against doctor's warnings, but could only manage fourth. He also attempted to persevere at the 2016 European Athletics Championships, but dropped out of the heats and brought his season to a close. His injury rehabilitation in the 2017 season was slow, and he continued to experience pain while running, while affected his performances that year. Competing with the British 4 × 100 metres relay quartet, the team failed to finish at the 2017 IAAF World Relays, but set a championship record of 38.08 seconds to win at the 2017 European Team Championships. Hughes placed fourth in the 200 m at the Adidas Boost Boston Games and 2017 British Athletics Championships. On the 2017 IAAF Diamond League circuit he was fifth at the London Grand Prix then had a season's best of 20.22 seconds for third at the Rabat Meeting. His injuries left him drained in the rounds at the 2017 World Championships in Athletics and he ended up seventh in his semi-final. His performances improved towards the end of the year, with third place in the 100 m at the British Athletics Grand Prix in Birmingham and sixth at the Memorial Van Damme 200 m.

In the 200 m at the 2018 Commonwealth Games, Hughes – competing for England – placed first in the final, but was disqualified for impeding the runner-up, Jereem Richards of Trinidad and Tobago. With his teammates Hughes won in the 4 × 100 metres relay, where he ran the second leg alongside Reuben Arthur, Richard Kilty and Harry Aikines-Aryeetey for England.

Hughes proved himself among the world's best 100 m runners in the 2018 season. He improved his best to 10.01 seconds in February, ran a wind-assisted 9.99 to win at the Boston Games (beating Yohan Blake and Tyson Gay), then set a world-leading time of 9.91 seconds in June, becoming the 129th person to break the 10-second barrier. This raised him to second on the all-time British rankings behind Linford Christie, and equal with James Dasaolu.

In 2021, Hughes reached the 100 m final at the delayed 2020 Summer Olympics, but was disqualified for a false start. Hughes and the British team placed second in the 4 × 100 relay, but were disqualified when teammate CJ Ujah was found guilty of doping.

At the 2022 European Athletics Championships in Munich, Germany, Hughes won gold in the 200 m and 4 × 100 m relay along with silver in the 100 m.

In June 2023 he broke Linford Christie's British 100 m record when he recorded a time of 9.83 seconds in New York at the New York Grand Prix.

In July 2023, at the British Athletics Championships, Hughes ran 19.77, faster than John Regis's national 200 metre record, but with a slightly too strong following wind (2.4 m/s) for record purposes, although his winning margin of 0.66 seconds was the largest winning margin for the men's 200 metres at these championships for over thirty years. A few days later, he ran a legal 19.73 at the London Diamond League, setting a new UK record and European sea-level record. By breaking 20 seconds, he became the third Briton and the 54th man in history to break 10 seconds for the 100 metres and 20 seconds for the 200 metres.

The following month, Hughes won a bronze medal in the 100 m at the 2023 World Athletics Championships in Budapest, Hungary.

Hughes was given a medical exemption to miss to 2024 British Athletics Championships after injuring his hamstring at a meeting in Jamaica. He was selected to compete in the 100 m, 200 m and 4 × 100 m relay at the 2024 Summer Olympics. Hughes went out in the 100 metres semi-finals at the Games in Paris and withdrew from the 200 metres before the heats. He won a bronze medal in the 4 × 100 metres relay.

In December 2024, it was announced that Hughes had signed up for the inaugural season of the Michael Johnson founded Grand Slam Track.

On 2 August 2025, Hughes won the 100 m final at the 2025 UK Athletics Championships in a time of 9.94 seconds and won the 200 metres the following day to claim his fifth British outdoor title.

At the 2026 European Championships in Birmingham, Hughes won the silver medal in the 200 metres, before winning gold as part of both the men's 4 × 100 metres relay and 4 × 100 metres mixed relay teams.

== Bests ==
Hughes is the first non-USA and non-Jamaican man to break 9.85 s for 100 metres and 19.85 s for 200 metres, a feat he achieved in July 2023 ten days after turning 28.

Personal bests

Event	Result (sec)	Wind (m/s)	Venue	Date
100 m	9.83; NR	+1.3	New York, USA	24 June 2023
200 m	19.73; NR	+1.6	London, Great Britain	23 July 2023
400 m	46.58	n/a	Kingston, Jamaica	11 February 2017

His 200 m time is a European sea-level record.

Seasons bests

Year	100 m	200 m	400 m
2023	9.83	19.73	
2022	9.91w/9.97	20.07	
2021	9.98	19.93w/20.14	
2020	n/a	n/a	47.05
2019	9.95	20.24	
2018	9.91	20.23	
2017	10.12 (63)	20.22 (28)	46.58
2016	10.10 (75)	20.62	46.95
2015	10.15 (87)	20.02 (12)	48.01
2014	10.12 (54)	20.32 (33)	48.80
2013	10.23	20.79	49.28
2012	10.42	20.90	
2011	10.81		
2010	11.14		

Times given in seconds and senior world rank in parentheses

== International competitions ==
Grand Slam Track results
Slam	Race group	Event	Pl.	Time	Prize money
2025 Kingston Slam	Short sprints	100 m	3rd	10.13	US$50,000
2025 Kingston Slam	Short sprints	200 m	2nd	20.37	US$50,000
2025 Miami Slam	Short sprints	100 m	4th	9.87	US$30,000
2025 Miami Slam	Short sprints	200 m	2nd	20.13	US$30,000
2025 Philadelphia Slam	Short sprints	200 m	2nd	20.50	US$50,000
2025 Philadelphia Slam	Short sprints	100 m	3rd	10.05	US$50,000

Year	Competition	Venue	Position	Event	Time	Wind (m/s)	Notes
Representing Anguilla
2010	CARIFTA Games (U17)	George Town, Cayman Islands	8th	100 m	11.14	+0.6	
2011	CARIFTA Games (U17)	Montego Bay, Jamaica	6th	100 m	10.96	−0.4	
2011	Commonwealth Youth Games	Douglas, Isle of Man	8th	100 m	10.92 w	+2.9	
2012	CARIFTA Games (U20)	Hamilton, Bermuda	3rd	100 m	10.41 w	+5.7	
2012	CARIFTA Games (U20)	Hamilton, Bermuda	4th	200 m	21.26	+0.5	
2012	Leeward Islands Junior Championships (U20)	Tortola, British Virgin Islands	1st	100 m	10.45 CR	−0.1	
2012	Leeward Islands Junior Championships (U20)	Tortola, British Virgin Islands	1st	200 m	21.26 CR	−2.0	
2012	Leeward Islands Junior Championships (U20)	Tortola, British Virgin Islands	3rd	4 × 100 m relay	45.91	—N/a	
2012	CAC Junior Championships (U18)	San Salvador, El Salvador	2nd	100 m	10.46	−0.6	
2012	CAC Junior Championships (U18)	San Salvador, El Salvador	1st	200 m	20.98	−1.5	
2012	World Junior Championships	Barcelona, Spain	15th (sf)	100 m	10.55	−0.5	
2012	World Junior Championships	Barcelona, Spain	7th (h)	200 m	20.90	—N/a	Did not start in the semifinal
2013	CARIFTA Games (U20)	Nassau, Bahamas	1st	100 m	10.44	−0.4	
2013	CARIFTA Games (U20)	Nassau, Bahamas	4th	200 m	20.77 w	+3.4	
2013	CAC Championships	Morelia, Mexico	7th	100 m	10.25	+0.5	
2013	Pan American Junior Championships	Medellín, Colombia	1st	100 m	10.31	+1.8	
2014	CAC Junior Championships (U20)	Morelia, Mexico	1st	200 m	20.33 CR	+0.8	
2014	World Junior Championships	Eugene, United States	5th	200 m	20.73 w	+2.3	
Representing Great Britain & England
2015	World Championships	Beijing, China	5th	200 m	20.02	−0.1	
2016	European Championships	Amsterdam, Netherlands	18th (h)	200 m	21.21	−1.1	
2017	IAAF World Relays	Nassau, Bahamas	3rd (h)	4 × 100 m relay	38.32	—N/a	Did not finish in the final
2017	European Team Championships	Lille, France	1st	4 × 100 m relay	38.08 CR	—N/a	
2017	World Championships	London, United Kingdom	24th (sf)	200 m	20.85	−0.3	
2018	Commonwealth Games	Gold Coast, Australia	DQ	200 m	20.12	+0.9	Disqualified under R163.2
2018	Commonwealth Games	Gold Coast, Australia	1st	4 × 100 m relay	38.13	—N/a	
2018	European Championships	Berlin, Germany	1st	100 m	9.95		CR
2018	European Championships	Berlin, Germany	1st	4 × 100 m relay	37.81	—N/a	
2019	World Championships	Doha, Qatar	2nd	4 × 100 m relay	37.36	—N/a	
2021	Olympic Games	Tokyo, Japan	DQ	100 m			
2021	Olympic Games	Tokyo, Japan	DQ	4 × 100 m relay	37.51	—N/a	
2022	World Championships	Eugene, United States	12th (sf)	100 m	10.13	+0.1	
2022	World Championships	Eugene, United States	3rd	4 × 100 m relay	37.83	—N/a	
2022	European Championships	Munich, Germany	2nd	100 m	9.99	+0.1	
2022	European Championships	Munich, Germany	1st	200 m	20.07	—N/a	
2022	European Championships	Munich, Germany	1st	4 × 100 m relay	37.67 CR	—N/a	
2023	World Championships	Budapest, Hungary	3rd	100 m	9.88	0.0	
2023	World Championships	Budapest, Hungary	4th	200 m	20.02	–0.2	
2023	World Championships	Budapest, Hungary	4th	4 × 100 m relay	37.80	—N/a	
2024	Olympic Games	Paris, France	14th (sf)	100 m	10.01	+0.5	
2024	Olympic Games	Paris, France	3rd	4 × 100 m relay	37.61	—N/a	
2025	World Championships	Tokyo, Japan	9th (sf)	100 m	10.03	+0.2	
2025	World Championships	Tokyo, Japan	5th	200 m	19.78	0.0	
2026	Commonwealth Games	Glasgow, United Kingdom	19th (sf)	200 m	20.67	+3.5	
2026	European Championships	Birmingham, United Kingdom	2nd	200 m	20.16	+2.5	
2026	European Championships	Birmingham, United Kingdom	1st	4 × 100 m relay	38.45	—N/a	
2026	European Championships	Birmingham, United Kingdom	1st	Mixed 4 × 100 metres relay	39.97	—N/a	

=== Track records ===
As of 15 September 2024, Hughes holds the following track records for 100 metres and 200 metres.

==== 100 metres ====
Location	Time	Windspeed m/s	Date
Baie-Mahault	10.03	–0.9	18/05/2019

==== 200 metres ====
Location	Time	Windspeed m/s	Date
Manchester	19.77	+2.3	09/07/2023

== See also ==
- List of 200 metres national champions (men)
- List of eligibility transfers in athletics
- List of Commonwealth Games medallists in athletics (men)
