= Kieron Rogers =

Anguillan sprinter

Personal information
- Nationality: Anguillan
- Born: 8 September 1988 (age 37)

Sport
- Sport: Track and field
- Event: 100m

Kieron Rogers (born 8 September 1988) is an Anguillan sprinter. He competed in the 100 metres event at the 2013 World Championships in Athletics.
