= Anguilla Amateur Athletic Federation =

Governing body for athletics in Anguilla

- Sport: Athletics
- Jurisdiction: Federation
- Abbreviation: AAAF
- Founded: 1978
- Affiliation: IAAF
- Affiliation date: 1978
- Regional affiliation: NACAC
- Headquarters: The Valley
- President: Lorna Rogers
- Vice president: Winston Duncan
- Secretary: Tracelyn Hamilton
- Replaced: Anguilla Amateur Athletic Association

Official website
- trackandfieldaxa.wordpress.com
- (Anguilla)

The Anguilla Amateur Athletic Federation (AAAF) is the governing body for the sport of athletics in Anguilla. Current president is Lorna Rogers.

== History ==
AAAF was founded as Anguilla Amateur Athletic Association in 1978 and was affiliated to the IAAF the same year.

== Affiliations ==
AAAF is the national member federation for Anguilla in the following international organisations:

- International Association of Athletics Federations (IAAF)
- North American, Central American and Caribbean Athletic Association (NACAC)
- Association of Panamerican Athletics (APA)
- Central American and Caribbean Athletic Confederation (CACAC)
- Leeward Islands Athletics Association (LIAA)

=== Olympic recognition ===
There is no separate Olympic Committee in Anguilla, as Anguilla is a British Overseas Territory, not an independent state. Therefore, athletes from Anguilla are not entitled to represent Anguilla at Olympic Games, but may compete for Great Britain, either while maintaining Anguillan qualification of IAAF events, or as all Anguillans are entitled to a British passport, by transferring allegiance to Great Britain for all events.

Anguillan born long jumper Shara Proctor availed of the latter route to represent Great Britain at both the 2012 Summer Olympics and the 2013 World Championships. Anguillan sprint prospect Zharnel Hughes has indicated he may make a similar switch.

== National records ==
AAAF maintains the Anguillian records in athletics.
