= 2006 Leeward Islands Junior Championships in Athletics =

V Leeward Islands Junior/Youth Championships
- Dates: July 1–2
- Host city: St. John's, Antigua and Barbuda
- Level: Junior and Youth
- Events: 50 (14 junior boys, 14 junior girls, 11 youth boys, 11 youth girls),

The 2006 Leeward Islands Junior Championships in Athletics took place on July 1–2, 2006. The event was held in St. John's, Antigua and Barbuda. A detailed report was published.

A total of 50 events were contested, 25 by boys and 25 by girls.

== Medal summary ==
Complete results can be found on the Nevis Amateur Athletic Association webpage.

=== Boys (U-20) ===
Event	Gold		Silver		Bronze	
100 metres (wind: m/s)	Richard Richardson; Antigua and Barbuda	10.59	David Walters; U.S. Virgin Islands	10.63	Mark Kendall; British Virgin Islands	10.65
200 metres	Richard Richardson; Antigua and Barbuda	21.35	David Walters; U.S. Virgin Islands	21.54	Mark Kendall; British Virgin Islands	21.79
400 metres	Calvin Dascent; U.S. Virgin Islands	49.26	Richard Richardson; Antigua and Barbuda	50.10	Trent Harigan; British Virgin Islands	51.25
800 metres	Leron Chambers; Saint Kitts	2:03.00	Nashaine Johnson; Anguilla	2:03.6	Derrol Thomas; Antigua and Barbuda	2:08.2
1500 metres	Leron Chambers; Saint Kitts	4:18.00	Juan Robles; U.S. Virgin Islands	4:18.18	Jess Louison; Antigua and Barbuda	4:28.10
5000 metres^{†}	Leron Chambers; Saint Kitts	17:08.9	Jess Louison; Antigua and Barbuda	17:09.6	Jervin Liburd; Nevis	18:34.2
High jump	Kimon Lewis; British Virgin Islands	1.96m	Kirmack Browne; Saint Kitts	1.93m	McKenzie Baltimore; British Virgin Islands	1.88m
Long jump	Joseph Pemberton; Anguilla	6.68m	Calvert Chiverton; Saint Kitts	6.67m	Trent Harigan; British Virgin Islands	6.65m
Triple jump^{†}	Kirmack Browne; Saint Kitts	13.44m	Calvert Chiverton; Saint Kitts	13.29m	Vincent Walters; Antigua and Barbuda	13.29m
Shot put	Omar Jones; British Virgin Islands	12.95m	Lenbirch Williams; Saint Kitts	12.67m	Curtis Isaac; Nevis	12.42m
Discus throw	Omar Jones; British Virgin Islands	35.71m	Lenbirch Williams; Saint Kitts	31.70m	Trent Harrigan; British Virgin Islands	30.92m
Javelin throw	Omar Jones; British Virgin Islands	58.22m	Joseph Pemberton; Anguilla	53.72m	Curtis Isaac; Nevis	52.41m
4 x 100 metres relay	United States Virgin Islands	42.70	Antigua and Barbuda	43.20	British Virgin Islands	43.32
4 x 400 metres relay^{†}	United States Virgin Islands	3:23.01	Antigua and Barbuda	3:26.9	Saint Kitts	3:28.4

^{†}: Open event for both U20 and U17 athletes.

=== Girls (U-20) ===
Event	Gold		Silver		Bronze	
100 metres	Tameka Williams; Saint Kitts	12.00	Karene King; British Virgin Islands	12.11	Tyfia Lee; U.S. Virgin Islands	12.25
200 metres	Tameka Williams; Saint Kitts	24.70	Jackhel King; British Virgin Islands	24.96	Chadiola Chumney; U.S. Virgin Islands	25.01
400 metres	Tyfia Lee; U.S. Virgin Islands	56.32	Chadiola Chumney; U.S. Virgin Islands	58.08	Melissa Warner; Saint Kitts	59.20
800 metres	Tamiko Butler; Antigua and Barbuda	2:32.8	Cleopatra Perry; Nevis	2:33.5	Kimesha Samuel; Saint Kitts	2:33.8
1500 metres	Kenryca Francis; Antigua and Barbuda	4:50.8	Aneisa Williams; U.S. Virgin Islands	5:06.32	Tamiko Butler; Antigua and Barbuda	5:15.70
3000 metres^{†}	Kenryca Francis; Antigua and Barbuda	10:28.6	Rosalie Pringle; Saint Kitts	11:33.7	Tamiko Butler; Antigua and Barbuda	11:55.0
High jump	Saungie Liburd; British Virgin Islands	1.57m	Shara Proctor; Anguilla	1.52m	LaSharma Parris; Nevis; Amy Guishard; Saint Kitts	1.47m
Long jump	Shara Proctor; Anguilla	6.13m	Tameka Williams; Saint Kitts	5.95m	Sherifa Whyte; Saint Kitts	5.69m
Triple jump^{†}	Sheriffa Whyte; Saint Kitts	11.01m	Saungie Liburd; British Virgin Islands	10.70m	Amy Guishard; Saint Kitts	10.62m
Shot put	Amy Guishard; Saint Kitts	9.96m	Malish Allen; Nevis	8.00m	Jasmine Symonds; Nevis	7.84m
Discus throw	Shara Proctor; Anguilla	28.55m	LaSharma Parris; Nevis	21.26m	Amy Guishard; Saint Kitts	21.14m
Javelin throw	Amanda Edwards; Antigua and Barbuda	38.16m	Amy Guishard; Saint Kitts	29.33m	Shara Proctor; Anguilla	28.00m
4 x 100 metres relay	United States Virgin Islands	50.53	British Virgin Islands	50.62	Antigua and Barbuda	52.79
4 x 400 metres relay^{†}	British Virgin Islands	3:56.5	Saint Kitts	4:01.7	Antigua and Barbuda	4:25.5

^{†}: Open event for both U20 and U17 athletes.

=== Boys (U-17) ===
Event	Gold		Silver		Bronze	
100 metres	Alister Clarke; Saint Kitts	10.64	Cleve Whyte; Anguilla	11.15	Chetal Evans; Saint Kitts	11.41
200 metres	Alister Clarke; Saint Kitts	21.77	Jevon Claxton; Nevis	22.20	Kadeem Smith; Saint Kitts	22.30
400 metres	Kadeem Smith; Saint Kitts	48.90	Jevon Claxton; Nevis	49.74	Maverick Weatherhead; Antigua and Barbuda	52.60
800 metres	Kadeem Smith; Saint Kitts	2:04.00	Tavon Nelson; Antigua and Barbuda	2:06.8	Kendale Liburd; Saint Kitts	2:07.3
1500 metres	Tavon Nelson; Antigua and Barbuda	4:30.28	Omari Daniels; Antigua and Barbuda	4:30.75	Kendale Liburd; Saint Kitts	4:31.00
High jump	Reshawn Shabaz; Antigua and Barbuda	1.88m	Troy Rogers; Saint Kitts	1.88m	Yohan Romney; Anguilla	1.78m
Long jump	Troy Rogers; Saint Kitts	6.29m	Rashawn Shabazz; Antigua and Barbuda	6.29m	Shaquille Pringle; Saint Kitts	6.27m
Shot put	Rohand Jeffers; Nevis	10.98m	Vincent Walters; Antigua and Barbuda	10.57m	Jonathan Dutil; Nevis	10.50m
Discus throw	Jonathan Dutil; Nevis	28.09m	Rohand Jeffers; Nevis	27.16m	Rashawn Shabazz; Antigua and Barbuda	23.48m
Javelin throw	Chatel Evans; Saint Kitts	46.61m	Vincent Walters; Antigua and Barbuda	39.95m	Rohand Jeffers; Nevis	32.32m
4 x 100 metres relay	Saint Kitts	44.14	Nevis	44.98	Anguilla	47.24

=== Girls (U-17) ===
Event	Gold		Silver		Bronze	
100 metres	Shanice Hazel; British Virgin Islands	11.92	Ashley Kelly; British Virgin Islands	12.08	Stacey Chandler; Antigua and Barbuda	12.50
200 metres	Ashley Kelly; British Virgin Islands	24.61	Britney Wattley; British Virgin Islands	25.00	Olicia Benjamin; Antigua and Barbuda	25.60
400 metres	Chantel Malone; British Virgin Islands	57.90	Treferzana White; Saint Kitts	58.36	Vanessa Bennett; Saint Kitts	58.84
800 metres	Treferzana White; Saint Kitts	2:22.6	Linda Blackett; Antigua and Barbuda	2:26.9	Rochelle James; Saint Kitts	2:28.8
1500 metres	Linda Blackett; Antigua and Barbuda	5:05.12	Rosalie Pringle; Saint Kitts	5:18.50	Latoya Joseph; Antigua and Barbuda	5:26.45
High jump	Shanice Hazel; British Virgin Islands	1.57m	Shinelle Proctor; Anguilla	1.52m	Davanna Claxton; Saint Kitts; Tamara Carty; Nevis	1.42m
Long jump	Chantel Malone; British Virgin Islands	5.46m	Shanice Hazel; British Virgin Islands	5.11m	Davanna Claxton; Saint Kitts	5.05m
Shot put	Shearma Stanley; Saint Kitts	9.40m	Tesril Nisbet; Nevis	8.79m	Stacey Chandler; Antigua and Barbuda	8.25m
Discus throw	Latoya Jones; Nevis	20.89m	Stacey Chandler; Antigua and Barbuda	18.88m	Sherima Stanley; Saint Kitts	18.72m
Javelin throw	Sherima Stanley; Saint Kitts	26.00m	Shamora Penn; British Virgin Islands	22.63m	Tamara Carty; Nevis	20.84m
4 x 100 metres relay	British Virgin Islands	48.12	Saint Kitts	50.15	Antigua and Barbuda	50.47

== Medal table (unofficial) ==
* Host nation (Antigua and Barbuda)

Rank	Nation	Gold	Silver	Bronze	Total
1	Saint Kitts	18	13	17	48
2	British Virgin Islands	12	8	7	27
3	Antigua and Barbuda*	9	11	14	34
4	U.S. Virgin Islands	5	5	2	12
5	Nevis	3	8	9	20
6	Anguilla	3	5	3	11
Totals (6 entries)		50	50	52	152

== Team trophies ==
The scores for the team trophy were published.

The host country is highlighted in lavender blue

Rank	Nation	Points
1st place, gold medalist(s)	Saint Kitts	146
2	Antigua and Barbuda	97
3	British Virgin Islands	96
4	Nevis	49
5	U.S. Virgin Islands	43
6	Anguilla	33
7	Montserrat	0

== Participation ==
According to an unofficial count, 138 athletes from 7 countries participated.

- Anguilla (20)
- Antigua and Barbuda (26)
- British Virgin Islands (22)
- Montserrat (1)
- Nevis (25)
- Saint Kitts (32)
- U.S. Virgin Islands (12)
