= 2005 Leeward Islands Junior Championships in Athletics =

IV Leeward Islands Junior/Youth Championships
- Dates: May 28–29
- Host city: St. John's, Antigua and Barbuda
- Venue: Yasco Sports Complex
- Level: Junior and Youth
- Events: 44 (14 junior boys, 10 junior girls, 11 youth boys, 9 youth girls)

The 2005 Leeward Islands Junior Championships in Athletics took place on May 28–29, 2005. The event was held at the Yasco Sports Complex in St. John's, Antigua and Barbuda. A detailed report was published.

A total of 44 events were contested, 25 by boys and 19 by girls.

== Medal summary ==
Complete results can be found on the Nevis Amateur Athletic Association webpage.

=== Boys (U-20) ===
Event	Gold		Silver		Bronze	
100 metres	Daniel Bailey; Antigua and Barbuda	10.77	Michael Henry; Montserrat	11.09	Richard Richardson; Antigua and Barbuda	11.16
200 metres	Daniel Bailey; Antigua and Barbuda	21.54	Michael Henry; Montserrat	22.19	Richard Richardson; Antigua and Barbuda	22.61
400 metres	Garette Forde; Antigua and Barbuda	49.58	Trent Harrigan; British Virgin Islands	49.74	Linton Liburd; Nevis	50.63
800 metres	Garette Forde; Antigua and Barbuda	2:04.9	Cody Nedd; Antigua and Barbuda	2:07.0	Nashaine Johnson; Anguilla	2:09.7
1500 metres	Jess Louisa; Antigua and Barbuda	4:27.5	Kerwin Prescod; Antigua and Barbuda	4:31.3	Shervon Green; Nevis	4:42.3
5000 metres^{†}	Jess Louisa; Antigua and Barbuda	17:10.2	Kerwin Prescod; Antigua and Barbuda	17:12.7	Shervon Green; Nevis	19:12.1
High jump	Keone Lewis; British Virgin Islands	1.89	McKenzie Baltimore; British Virgin Islands	1.83	Linton Liburd; Nevis	1.78
Long jump	Brandon Joseph; Antigua and Barbuda	6.91	Trent Harrigan; British Virgin Islands	6.42	McKenzie Baltimore; British Virgin Islands	6.31
Triple jump^{†}	Omar Jones; British Virgin Islands	12.55	Brandon Joseph; Antigua and Barbuda	12.42	McKenzie Baltimore; British Virgin Islands	12.39
Shot put	Jordon Luke; British Virgin Islands	13.69	Kyle Francis; British Virgin Islands	12.75	Curtis Isaac; Nevis	12.25
Discus throw	Kyle Francis; British Virgin Islands	41.62	Jordon Luke; British Virgin Islands	39.38	Anthony Tonge; Antigua and Barbuda	33.58
Javelin throw	Omar Jones; British Virgin Islands	49.22	Andrew Thomas; British Virgin Islands	46.60	Curtis Isaac; Nevis	45.02
4 x 100 metres relay	Antigua and Barbuda	42.73	British Virgin Islands	44.93	Montserrat	46.01
4 x 400 metres relay^{†}	Antigua and Barbuda	3:26.00	British Virgin Islands	3:26.15	Nevis	3:38.70

^{†}: Open event for both U20 and U17 athletes.

=== Girls (U-20) ===
Event	Gold		Silver		Bronze	
100 metres	Jackhel King; British Virgin Islands	12.58	Andrea Jno-Baptiste; Antigua and Barbuda	12.75	Georgetta Lewis; Antigua and Barbuda	13.89
200 metres	Jackhel King; British Virgin Islands	24.50	Chadiola Chumney; U.S. Virgin Islands	24.55	Andrea Jno-Baptiste; Antigua and Barbuda	26.58
400 metres	Chadiola Chumney; U.S. Virgin Islands	1:03.1	Celisia Maloney; Antigua and Barbuda	1:05.4	Georgetta Lewis; Antigua and Barbuda	1:07.9
800 metres	Celisia Maloney; Antigua and Barbuda	2:27.0	Cleopatra Perry; Nevis	2:37.8	Kamecia Weston; Antigua and Barbuda	3:21.1
3000 metres^{†}	Kenryca Francis; Antigua and Barbuda	11:02.0	Latoya Joseph; Antigua and Barbuda	11:42.5	Leader Hilisha; Nevis	13:29.8
High jump	Zelma Mills; Nevis	1.52	Saungie Liburd; British Virgin Islands	1.42	Cleopatra Perry; Nevis	1.37
Long jump	Georgetta Lewis; Antigua and Barbuda	4.95	Kamecia Weston; Antigua and Barbuda	4.73	Zelma Mills; Nevis	4.66
Triple jump^{†}	Chantel Malone; British Virgin Islands	11.23	Saungie Liburd; British Virgin Islands	10.09	Nicole Hunte; Antigua and Barbuda	10.08
Shot put	Zelma Mills; Nevis	9.34	Jasmine Simmonds; Nevis	8.34	Georgetta Lewis; Antigua and Barbuda	7.50
Javelin throw	Jasmine Simmonds; Nevis	32.46	Zelma Mills; Nevis	30.10	Saungie Liburd; British Virgin Islands	23.58

^{†}: Open event for both U20 and U17 athletes.

=== Boys (U-17) ===
Event	Gold		Silver		Bronze	
100 metres	David Walters; U.S. Virgin Islands	11.16	Michael Butler; British Virgin Islands	11.52	Cory Milette; Antigua and Barbuda	11.63
200 metres	David Walters; U.S. Virgin Islands	22.32	Calvin Dascent; U.S. Virgin Islands	22.68	Michael Butler; British Virgin Islands	22.95
400 metres	Calvin Dascent; U.S. Virgin Islands	50.12	Cory Milette; Antigua and Barbuda	51.52	Kesswin Anthony; Antigua and Barbuda	52.51
800 metres	Maverick Weathehead; Antigua and Barbuda	2:04.3	Derol Thomas; Antigua and Barbuda	2:07.5	Eutroy Liburd; Nevis	2:09.5
1500 metres	Maverick Weathehead; Antigua and Barbuda	2:09.3^{*}	Derol Thomas; Antigua and Barbuda	2:16.1^{*}	Eutroy Liburd; Nevis	2:24.4^{*}
High jump	Joseph Pemberton; Anguilla	1.71	Akeel Burrows; British Virgin Islands	1.65	Gary Gumbs; Anguilla; Akimo Williams; British Virgin Islands; Andre Browne; Nevis; Quinnito Griffin; Nevis	1.52
Long jump	Joseph Pemberton; Anguilla	6.14	Denvil Ruan; Anguilla	5.99	Akeel Burrows; British Virgin Islands	5.83
Shot put	Joseph Pemberton; Anguilla	13.16	Matthew Charles; Anguilla	12.93	Omari Liburd; Nevis	12.60
Discus throw	Andre Browne; Nevis	27.86	Johnathan Dutil; Nevis	27.32	Matthew Charles; Anguilla	26.40
Javelin throw	Joseph Pemberton; Anguilla	41.82	Akeel Burrows; British Virgin Islands	34.30	Andre Browne; Nevis	31.72
4 x 100 metres relay	Antigua and Barbuda	44.61	British Virgin Islands	46.17	Anguilla	46.98

^{*}: The published times for the 1500 metre race are not reasonable. Might be intermediate results for 800 metres.

=== Girls (U-17) ===
Event	Gold		Silver		Bronze	
100 metres	Anika Jno-Baptiste; Antigua and Barbuda	12.14	Stacey Chandler; Antigua and Barbuda	12.61	Shanice Hazel; British Virgin Islands	12.77
200 metres	Latoya Jones; Nevis	26.27	Britney Wattley; British Virgin Islands	26.28	Sabia Hughes; Antigua and Barbuda	26.73
400 metres	Charez Weste; Antigua and Barbuda	57.85	Chantel Malone; British Virgin Islands	59.64	Sabia Hughes; Antigua and Barbuda	59.77
800 metres	Quamei Perry; Antigua and Barbuda	2:21.2	Bianca Dougan; British Virgin Islands	2:30.6	Khanishque Todman; British Virgin Islands	2:32.2
1500 metres	Kenryca Francis; Antigua and Barbuda	5:07.2	Latoya Joseph; Antigua and Barbuda	5:14.5	Makeda Challenger; Nevis	5:52.5
High jump	Chantel Malone; British Virgin Islands	1.58	Lasharma Parris; Nevis	1.55	Nicole Hunte; Antigua and Barbuda	1.42
Long jump	Chantel Malone; British Virgin Islands	5.30	Shanice Hazel; British Virgin Islands	4.93	Nicole Hunte; Antigua and Barbuda	4.65
Shot put	Chenay Rogers; U.S. Virgin Islands	8.74	Lasharma Parris; Nevis	8.29	Ashley Kelly; British Virgin Islands	8.18
4 x 100 metres relay	Antigua and Barbuda	49.04	British Virgin Islands	50.28	Nevis	54.55

== Medal table (unofficial) ==
The unofficial medal count (below) differs slightly from the published medal table.

* Host nation (Antigua and Barbuda)

Rank	Nation	Gold	Silver	Bronze	Total
1	Antigua and Barbuda (ATG)*	20	13	15	48
2	British Virgin Islands (IVB)	10	19	9	38
3	Nevis (NEV)	5	6	18	29
4	U.S. Virgin Islands (VIR)	5	2	0	7
5	Anguilla	4	2	4	10
6	Montserrat (MSR)	0	2	1	3
Totals (6 entries)		44	44	47	135

== Team trophies ==
The final team scores were published.

The host country is highlighted in lavender blue

Rank	Nation	Points
1st place, gold medalist(s)	Antigua and Barbuda	164
2	British Virgin Islands	108.25
3	Nevis	61.5
4	U.S. Virgin Islands	31
5	Anguilla	24.25
6	Montserrat	7

== Participation ==
According to an unofficial count, 109 athletes from 6 countries participated.

- Anguilla (15)
- Antigua and Barbuda (31)
- British Virgin Islands (23)
- Montserrat (9)
- Nevis (27)
- U.S. Virgin Islands (4)
