= British Virgin Islands at the Pan American Games =

- IOC code: IVB
- NOC: BVI Olympic Committee
- Medals: Gold 1 Silver 0 Bronze 0 Total 1

Pan American Games appearances (overview)
- 1983; 1987; 1991; 1995; 1999; 2003; 2007; 2011; 2015; 2019; 2023

The British Virgin Islands has competed at every edition of the Pan American Games since the ninth edition of the multi-sport event in 1983. The British Virgin Islands did not compete at the first and only Pan American Winter Games in 1990.

The British Virgin Islands won its first ever gold medal and its first ever Pan American Games medal after Chantel Malone won the women's long jump track and field event at the 2019 Pan American Games in Lima, Peru.

== Medal count ==
To sort the tables by host city, total medal count, or any other column, click on the icon next to the column title.

=== Summer ===
Year	Ref.	Edition	Host city	Rank	Gold	Silver	Bronze	Total
1951		I	(Argentina) Buenos Aires	Did not participate				
1955		II	Mexico City	Did not participate				
1959		III	(United States) Chicago	Did not participate				
1963		IV	(Brazil) São Paulo	Did not participate				
1967		V	(Canada) Winnipeg	Did not participate				
1971		VI	(Colombia) Cali	Did not participate				
1975		VII	Mexico City	Did not participate				
1979		VIII	(Puerto Rico) San Juan	Did not participate				
1983		IX	(Venezuela) Caracas	—	0	0	0	0
1987		X	(United States) Indianapolis	—	0	0	0	0
1991		XI	(Cuba) Havana	—	0	0	0	0
1995		XII	(Argentina) Mar del Plata	—	0	0	0	0
1999		XIII	(Canada) Winnipeg	—	0	0	0	0
2003		XIV	(Dominican Republic) Santo Domingo	—	0	0	0	0
2007		XV	(Brazil) Rio de Janeiro	—	0	0	0	0
2011		XVI	(Mexico) Guadalajara	—	0	0	0	0
2015		XVII	(Canada) Toronto	—	0	0	0	0
2019		XVIII	(Peru) Lima	23rd	1	0	0	1
2023		XIX	(Chile) Santiago	—	0	0	0	0
Total				—	1	0	0	1

=== Winter ===
Year	Ref.	Edition	Host city	Rank	Gold	Silver	Bronze	Total
1990		I	(Argentina) Las Leñas	Did not participate				
Total				—	0	0	0	0

=== Medals by sport ===
Sport	Gold	Silver	Bronze	Total
Athletics	1	0	0	1
Totals (1 entries)	1	0	0	1
