= 2002 Leeward Islands Junior Championships in Athletics =

II Leeward Islands Junior/Youth Championships
- Dates: June 1–2
- Host city: Road Town, Tortola, British Virgin Islands
- Venue: A. O. Shirley Recreation Ground
- Level: Junior and Youth
- Events: 42 (12 junior boys, 11 junior girls, 10 youth boys, 9 youth girls)
- Participation: 135 athletes from 6 nations

The 2002 Leeward Islands Junior Championships in Athletics took place on June 1–2, 2002. The event was held at the A. O. Shirley Recreation Ground in Road Town, Tortola, British Virgin Islands. A detailed report was published.

A total of 42 events were contested, 22 by boys and 20 by girls.

== Medal summary ==
Medal winners were published. Complete results can be found on the Nevis Amateur Athletic Association webpage.

=== Boys (U-20) ===
| Event | Gold | | Silver | | Bronze | |
|---|---|---|---|---|---|---|
| 100 metres | Shawn Prentice; U.S. Virgin Islands | 11.56 | Jamie Henry; Saint Kitts | 11.58 | Rodell Wattley; Nevis | 11.59 |
| 200 metres | Talvert Clarke; Saint Kitts | 22.91 | Jamie Henry; Saint Kitts | 23.42 | Shawn Prentice; U.S. Virgin Islands | 23.43 |
| 400 metres | Kevin Fahie; British Virgin Islands | 51.20 | Shawn Prentice; U.S. Virgin Islands | 51.74 | Chester Williams; Antigua and Barbuda | 51.92 |
| 800 metres | Jamille Nelson; Antigua and Barbuda | 1:59.61 | Jerome Toussaint; Saint Kitts | 2:01.39 | Shalico Charles; Antigua and Barbuda | 2:05.13 |
| 1500 metres | Jamille Nelson; Antigua and Barbuda | 4:16.62 | Shalico Charles; Antigua and Barbuda | 4:32.76 | Jermaine Bryan; British Virgin Islands | 4:38.63 |
| 5000 metres^{†} | Jamille Nelson; Antigua and Barbuda | 16:51.78 | Thynel Martin; Nevis | 19:02.43 | Jermaine Bryan; British Virgin Islands | 19:29.94 |
| High jump | Eston Williams; Saint Kitts | 1.85 | Linden Peters; British Virgin Islands | 1.65 | Nicholas Lurac; British Virgin Islands | 1.65 |
| Long jump | Ayata Joseph; Antigua and Barbuda | 6.85 | Chester Williams; Antigua and Barbuda | 6.35 | Eston Williams; Saint Kitts | 6.01 |
| Triple jump^{†} | Ayata Joseph; Antigua and Barbuda | 15.16 | Eston Williams; Saint Kitts | 13.61 | Chester Williams; Antigua and Barbuda | 13.46 |
| Shot put | Eric Mathias; British Virgin Islands | 13.51 | Leroy Thomas; British Virgin Islands | 11.64 | Lesroy Browne; Saint Kitts | 11.09 |
| Discus throw | Eric Mathias; British Virgin Islands | 41.39 | Leroy Thomas; British Virgin Islands | 33.55 | Lesroy Brown; Saint Kitts | 24.68 |
| Javelin throw | Abdul Wattley; Sint Maarten | 47.30 | Eston Williams; Saint Kitts | 42.75 | Nicholas Charles; British Virgin Islands | 40.32 |

^{†}: Open event for both U20 and U17 athletes.

=== Girls (U-20) ===
| Event | Gold | | Silver | | Bronze | |
|---|---|---|---|---|---|---|
| 100 metres | Chandora Codrington; Antigua and Barbuda | 12.47 | Adriana Herbert; British Virgin Islands | 12.57 | Dion Marquis; British Virgin Islands | 12.76 |
| 200 metres | Chandora Codrington; Antigua and Barbuda | 26.15 | Adriana Herbert; British Virgin Islands | 26.61 | Nathandra John; Saint Kitts | 26.73 |
| 400 metres | Janil Williams; Antigua and Barbuda | 59.52 | Antoinette Huggins; Saint Kitts | 1:02.08 | Stacy Quashie; Antigua and Barbuda | 1:02.67 |
| 800 metres | Janil Williams; Antigua and Barbuda | 2:20.18 | Stacy Quashie; Antigua and Barbuda | 2:22.98 | Antoinette Huggins; Saint Kitts | 2:50.84 |
| 1500 metres | Janil Williams; Antigua and Barbuda | 5:01.26 | Stacy Quashie; Antigua and Barbuda | 5:03.77 | Amie Chapman; Nevis | 6:01.18 |
| 3000 metres^{†} | Janil Williams; Antigua and Barbuda | 11:37.81 | Celisa Maloney; Antigua and Barbuda | 11:42.08 | Zadia Browne; Nevis | 12:06.14 |
| High jump | Rosalie Glasford; Saint Kitts | 1.52 | Miranda Bubb; Nevis | 1.45 | | |
| Long jump | Shamyse Bartlette; Nevis | 5.17 | Sindy Nathan; Saint Kitts | 4.79 | Alisha Francis; Saint Kitts | 4.58 |
| Shot put | Latoya George; British Virgin Islands | 9.33 | Antoinette Huggins; Saint Kitts | 9.03 | Shamyse Bartlette; Nevis | 8.01 |
| Discus throw | Latoya George; British Virgin Islands | 25.78 | Nerida Skelton; British Virgin Islands | 21.05 | Rosalie Glasford; Saint Kitts | 20.35 |
| Javelin throw | Rosalie Glasford; Saint Kitts | 22.00 | Shamyse Barlette; Nevis | 21.72 | Antoinette Huggins; Saint Kitts | 21.20 |

^{†}: Open event for both U20 and U17 athletes.

=== Boys (U-17) ===
| Event | Gold | | Silver | | Bronze | |
|---|---|---|---|---|---|---|
| 100 metres | Aliston Potter; British Virgin Islands | 10.8 (ht) | Robert Morton; Nevis | 11.0 (ht) | Daniel Bailey; Antigua and Barbuda | 11.2 (ht) |
| 200 metres | Aliston Potter; British Virgin Islands | 22.84 | Robert Morton; Nevis | 23.08 | Adino Greenaway; Antigua and Barbuda | 23.33 |
| 400 metres | Robert Morton; Nevis | 53.40 | Linniel Warner; Saint Kitts | 53.55 | Mark Kendall; British Virgin Islands | 54.60 |
| 800 metres | Ervin Woolard; Saint Kitts | 2:09.04 | Calston Julius; Nevis | 2:09.43 | McCordie Prentice; U.S. Virgin Islands | 2:09.61 |
| 1500 metres | Ervin Woolard; Saint Kitts | 4:42.56 | O'Brien Huggins; Saint Kitts | 4:43.59 | McCordie Prentice; U.S. Virgin Islands | 4:47.24 |
| High jump | Aliston Potter; British Virgin Islands | 1.80 | Kimon Lewis; British Virgin Islands | 1.75 | Lenniel Warner; Saint Kitts | 1.70 |
| Long jump | Aliston Potter; British Virgin Islands | 6.35 | Claude Paul; Sint Maarten | 6.35 | Linniel Warner; Saint Kitts | 6.32 |
| Shot put | Lemberch Williams; Saint Kitts | 11.73 | Mikey Sprauve; British Virgin Islands | 10.09 | Tevoy Liburd; Nevis | 9.53 |
| Discus throw | Romeo Brown; Sint Maarten | 33.80 | Kyle Francis; British Virgin Islands | 30.34 | Mikey Sprauve; British Virgin Islands | 28.02 |
| Javelin throw | Romeo Brown; Sint Maarten | 40.38 | Robert Morton; Nevis | 34.70 | Randolph McDowall; British Virgin Islands | 32.29 |

=== Girls (U-17) ===
| Event | Gold | | Silver | | Bronze | |
|---|---|---|---|---|---|---|
| 100 metres | Stephanie Jones; Antigua and Barbuda | 12.52 | Andrea Jno Baptiste; Antigua and Barbuda | 12.59 | DeAnna Wattley; British Virgin Islands | 12.61 |
| 200 metres | Stephanie Jones; Antigua and Barbuda | 25.67 | Andrea Jno Baptiste; Antigua and Barbuda | 26.12 | DeAnna Wattley; British Virgin Islands | 26.36 |
| 400 metres | Stephanie Jones; Antigua and Barbuda | 58.33 | Andrea Jno Baptiste; Antigua and Barbuda | 58.89 | Teresa Browne; Nevis | 1:03.30 |
| 800 metres | Celisa Maloney; Antigua and Barbuda | 2:23.18 | Maliaka Anthony; Saint Kitts | 2:37.03 | Tanaysha Henry; British Virgin Islands | 2:39.19 |
| 1500 metres | Celisa Maloney; Antigua and Barbuda | 5:09.28 | Zadia Browne; Nevis | 5:26.31 | Kisanna Tweed; Saint Kitts | 5:31.78 |
| High jump | Zelma Mills; Nevis | 1.54 | Tanaysha Henry; British Virgin Islands | 1.47 | Melissa Allen; Nevis | 1.45 |
| Long jump | DeAnna Wattley; British Virgin Islands | 5.32 | Zelma Mills; Nevis | 4.79 | Kimoy Henry; Saint Kitts | 4.77 |
| Shot put | Kimay Henry; Saint Kitts | 10.82 | Jasmine Symonds; Nevis | 10.78 | Shanovia Thomas; British Virgin Islands | 10.58 |
| Discus throw | Krystal Frett; British Virgin Islands | 27.11 | Shenovia Thomas; British Virgin Islands | 24.91 | Kimoy Henry; Saint Kitts | 22.08 |

== Medal table (unofficial) ==
* Host nation (British Virgin Islands)

| Rank | Nation | Gold | Silver | Bronze | Total |
|---|---|---|---|---|---|
| 1 | Antigua and Barbuda (ATG) | 16 | 8 | 6 | 30 |
| 2 | British Virgin Islands (IVB)* | 11 | 11 | 12 | 34 |
| 3 | Saint Kitts | 8 | 11 | 13 | 32 |
| 4 | Nevis (NEV) | 3 | 10 | 7 | 20 |
| 5 | Sint Maarten | 3 | 1 | 0 | 4 |
| 6 | U.S. Virgin Islands (VIR) | 1 | 1 | 3 | 5 |
| Totals (6 entries) | | 42 | 42 | 41 | 125 |

== Team trophies ==
The scores for the team trophy were published.

The host country is highlighted in lavender blue

| Rank | Nation | Points |
|---|---|---|
| 1st place, gold medalist(s) | British Virgin Islands | 125 |
| 2 | Antigua and Barbuda | 124 |
| 3 | Saint Kitts | 101 |
| 4 | Nevis | 46 |
| 5 | Sint Maarten | 18 |
| 6 | U.S. Virgin Islands | 10 |

== Participation ==
According to an unofficial count, 135 athletes from 6 countries participated.

- Antigua and Barbuda (15)
- British Virgin Islands (32)
- Nevis (31)
- Saint Kitts (37)
- Sint Maarten (4)
- U.S. Virgin Islands (16)
