= Leeward Islands Championships in Athletics =

Athletics event

The Leeward Islands Championships in Athletics is an athletics event organized by the Leeward Islands Athletics Association (LIAA) open for (but not restricted to) athletes from its member associations.

== Leeward Islands Athletics Association ==
The Leeward Islands Athletics Association (LIAA) was founded in 2002, replacing the Leeward Islands Athletics Steering Committee that had previously organized the Leeward Island Championships.

=== Member associations ===
It comprises the following eight member associations

| Nation | Organisation | Website |
|---|---|---|
| Anguilla | Anguilla Amateur Athletic Federation | |
| Antigua and Barbuda | Athletic Association of Antigua & Barbuda | |
| British Virgin Islands | British Virgin Islands Athletics Association | |
| Montserrat | Montserrat Amateur Athletic Association | |
| Nevis | Nevis Amateur Athletic Association | |
| (Saint Kitts and Nevis) Saint Kitts | Saint Kitts & Nevis Amateur Athletic Association | |
| Sint Maarten | Sint Maarten Amateur Athletic Association | |
| United States Virgin Islands | Virgin Islands Track & Field Federation | |

Nevis is an independent member, the athletes compete in an own team separately from Saint Kitts.

=== Competitions ===
The LIAA hold two different championships: so-called Leeward Islands Junior Championships (effectively junior (U20) and youth (U17) championships), and Leeward Islands Youth Championships (effectively age group championships U15, U13, and U11).

== Editions ==
=== Leeward Islands Junior/Youth Championships ===
Leeward Islands Junior (U20) and Youth (U17) Championships, (dubbed Leeward Islands Youth Championships) have been held since 2001.

| Year | City | Country | Date | Venue |
|---|---|---|---|---|
| 2001 | Road Town, Tortola | British Virgin Islands | May 5–6 | A.O. Shirley Recreation Ground |
| 2002 | Road Town, Tortola | British Virgin Islands | June 1–2 | A.O. Shirley Recreation Ground |
| 2003 | Road Town, Tortola | British Virgin Islands | May 31-June 1 | A.O. Shirley Recreation Ground |
| 2004^{*} | St. John's | Antigua and Barbuda | May 15–16 | |
| 2005 | St. John's | Antigua and Barbuda | May 28–29 | Yasco Sports Complex |
| 2006 | St. John's | Antigua and Barbuda | July 1–2 | |
| 2008 | Road Town, Tortola | British Virgin Islands | June 28–29 | |
| 2012 | Road Town, Tortola | British Virgin Islands | June 9–10 | A.O. Shirley Recreation Ground |
| 2013 | Road Town, Tortola | British Virgin Islands | June 1 | A.O. Shirley Recreation Ground |
| 2014 | Road Town, Tortola | British Virgin Islands | June 7 | A.O. Shirley Recreation Ground |

^{*}: The 2004 event was announced, but no results could be retrieved. Might have been cancelled.

=== Leeward Islands Age Group Championships ===
Leeward Islands Age Group Championships for athletes U15, U13, and U11, (dubbed Leeward Islands Youth Championships) are held since 1993.

| Year | City | Country | Date | Venue |
|---|---|---|---|---|
| 1993 | Road Town, Tortola | British Virgin Islands | | |
| 1994 | Road Town, Tortola | British Virgin Islands | | |
| 1995 | Charlestown | Nevis | | Grove Park |
| 1996 | St. John's | Antigua and Barbuda | | |
| 1997 | The Valley | Anguilla | | |
| 1998 | Road Town, Tortola | British Virgin Islands | | |
| 1999 | Basseterre | (Saint Kitts and Nevis) Saint Kitts | | |
| 2001 | Charlestown | Nevis | May 12–13 | Grove Park |
| 2002 | Charlestown | Nevis | May 25–26 | Grove Park |
| 2003 | St. John's | Antigua and Barbuda | May 24–25 | Antigua Recreation Ground |
| 2004 | Sandy Point | (Saint Kitts and Nevis) Saint Kitts | April 24–25 | New Sandy Point Recreation Grounds |
| 2005 | The Valley | Anguilla | April 30-May 1 | |
| 2006 | Charlestown | Nevis | June 2–4 | Grove Park |
| 2009 | Bird Rock | (Saint Kitts and Nevis) Saint Kitts | May 30–31 | Silver Jubilee Athletic Stadium |
| 2010 | The Valley | Anguilla | May 22–23 | Ronald Webster Park |
| 2011 | The Valley | Anguilla | May 21–22 | Ronald Webster Park |
