= Squash at the 2015 Pan American Games – Qualification =

== Qualification system ==
A total of 56 athletes will qualify to compete at the Games (32 male, 24 female). Each country is allowed to enter a maximum of three male and three female athletes. The top ten men's teams and top eight women's teams (including Canada) at the 2014 Pan American Sports Festival will qualify for the games. A further two wildcards will be allocated (2 men). A nation may enter a maximum of two athletes per singles events, and one doubles per event.

== Qualification timeline ==
Event	Date	Venue
Pan American Sports Festival	September 7 – 13, 2014	(Mexico) San Miguel Zinacantepec

== Qualification summary ==
Nation	Men		Women		Total
Nation	Individual	Team	Individual	Team	Athletes
Argentina	3	X	3	X	6
Brazil			3	X	3
British Virgin Islands	1				1
Canada	3	X	3	X	6
Chile	3	X	3	X	6
Colombia	3	X	3	X	6
Ecuador	3	X			3
Guatemala	3	X	3	X	6
Guyana	3	X			3
Mexico	3	X	3	X	6
Paraguay	1				1
Peru	3	X			3
United States	3	X	3	X	6
Total: 13 NOCs	32	10	24	8	56

== Men ==
Event	Criterion	Qualified	Athletes per NOC	Total
Host nation	—N/a	Canada	3	3
2014 Pan American Sports Festival	Top 9	Mexico; Argentina; United States; Colombia; Chile; Peru; Ecuador; Guatemala; Guyana	3	27
Wildcard	—N/a	British Virgin Islands; Paraguay	2	2
TOTAL				32

== Women ==
Event	Criterion	Qualified	Athletes per NOC	Total
Host nation	—N/a	Canada	3	3
2014 Pan American Sports Festival	Top 7	United States; Brazil; Mexico; Colombia; Chile; Argentina; Guatemala	3	21
Wildcard	—N/a	~~Guyana~~	~~1~~	~~1~~
TOTAL				24

- Originally a women's wildcard was to be awarded, but it was reallocated to a second men's wildcard for unknown reasons.
