= British Virgin Islands at the 2019 Pan American Games =

- IOC code: IVB
- NOC: British Virgin Islands Olympic Committee
- Website: www.bviolympics.org/

in Lima, Peru 26 July–11 August 2019
- Competitors: 5 in 2 sports
- Flag bearer: Thad Lettsome (opening)
- Medals Ranked =23rd: Gold 1 Silver 0 Bronze 0 Total 1

Pan American Games appearances (overview)
- 1983; 1987; 1991; 1995; 1999; 2003; 2007; 2011; 2015; 2019; 2023

The British Virgin Islands competed at 2019 Pan American Games in Lima, Peru from 26 July to 11 August 2019.

The British Virgin Islands team of four athletes (three men and one woman) competing in two sports (athletics and sailing) was announced on 22 June 2019 as part of the 2nd annual Olympic Day Sports Festival. On the eve of the games, sprinter Ashley Kelly was added to the team, bringing the total team to five athletes. This represented a decline of one athlete from the Toronto 2015 Pan American Games.

During the opening ceremony of the games, sailor Thad Lettsome carried the flag of the country as part of the parade of nations.

The British Virgin Islands won its first ever gold medal and its first ever Pan American Games medal after Chantel Malone won the women's long jump track and field event. This was the country's only medal at the games, which ranked it a joint 23rd place with Barbados.

== Competitors ==
The following is the list of number of competitors (per gender) participating at the games per sport/discipline. The British Virgin Islands entered five competitors (three men and two women) in two sports. On the eve of the games, sprinter Ashley Kelly was added to the team, bringing the total team to five athletes.

| Sport | Men | Women | Total |
|---|---|---|---|
| Athletics (track and field) | 2 | 2 | 4 |
| Sailing | 1 | 0 | 1 |
| Total | 3 | 2 | 5 |

== Medalists ==
The following competitors from The British Virgin Islands won medals at the games. In the by discipline sections below, medalists' names are bolded.

| Medal | Name | Sport | Event | Date |
|---|---|---|---|---|
| Gold | Chantel Malone | Athletics | Women's long jump | August 6 |

== Athletics (track and field) ==
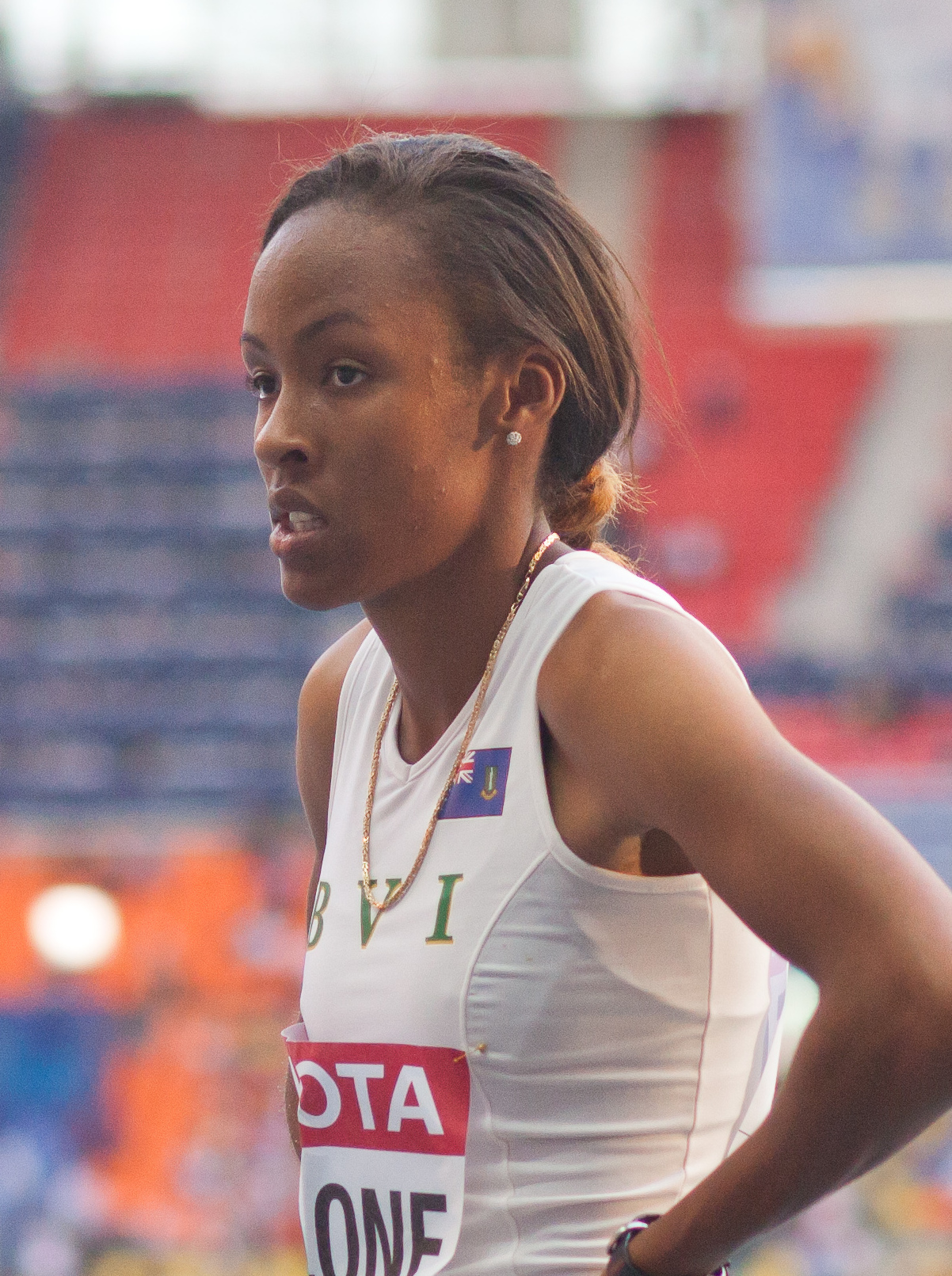
Chantel Malone won the country's first ever Pan American Games gold medal

The British Virgin Islands qualified four athletes (two men and two women). Kyron McMaster qualified by winning gold at the 2018 Central American and Caribbean Games. However, McMaster had to withdraw a few days into the games due an injury he sustained at a Diamond League event earlier in the season. Eldred Henry's performance during the 2019 indoor season also qualified him for the games.

The track and field team saw three athletes competing. Eldred Henry, the only male competitor, finished in sixth place in the shot put event with a best throw of 19.82. Sprinter and late addition to the team, Ashley Kelly, finished in 15th place during the heats with a time of 54.42. This time was not good to advance to the final. Finally, the British Virgin Islands won its first ever gold medal and its first ever Pan American Games medal after Chantel Malone won the women's long jump track and field event.

Key

- Note–Ranks given for track events are for the entire round

Track events

| Athlete | Event | Semifinal | | Final | |
| Athlete | Event | Result | Rank | Result | Rank |
|---|---|---|---|---|---|
| Kyron McMaster | Men's 400 m hurdles | did not start | | | |
| Ashley Kelly | Women's 400 m | 54.42 | 15 | did not advance | |

Field events

| Athlete | Event | Final | |
| Athlete | Event | Distance | Position |
|---|---|---|---|
| Eldred Henry | Men's shot put | 19.82 | 6 |
| **Chantel Malone** | Women's long jump | 6.68 | 1st place, gold medalist(s) |

== Sailing ==
The British Virgin Islands received a universality spot in the men's laser event. This marked the country's first appearance in the sport at the Pan American Games since the 1990s. During the opening ceremony of the games, sailor Thad Lettsome carried the flag of the country as part of the parade of nations. Lettsome finished in 19th place (out of 22) with a net points total of 153. Lettsome was the youngest sailor in the field, at the age of 17.

Men

| Athlete | Event | Race | | | | | | | | | | | Net Points | Final Rank |
| Athlete | Event | 1 | 2 | 3 | 4 | 5 | 6 | 7 | 8 | 9 | 10 | M | Net Points | Final Rank |
|---|---|---|---|---|---|---|---|---|---|---|---|---|---|---|
| Thad Lettsome | Laser | 20 | 16 | 20 | 19 | 19 | 15 | 19 | 18 | 11 | 16 | Did not qualify | 153 | 19 |

== See also ==
- British Virgin Islands at the 2020 Summer Olympics
