= 2008 Leeward Islands Junior Championships in Athletics =

VI Leeward Islands Junior/Youth Championships
- Dates: June 28–29
- Host city: Road Town, Tortola, British Virgin Islands
- Level: Junior and Youth
- Events: 47 (14 junior boys, 13 junior girls, 10 youth boys, 10 youth girls)
- Participation: 102 athletes from 7 nations

The 2008 Leeward Islands Junior Championships in Athletics took place on June 28–29, 2008. The event was held in Road Town, Tortola, British Virgin Islands. Reports and photos were published.

A total of 47 events were contested, 24 by boys and 23 by girls.

== Medal summary ==
Complete results can be found on the Nevis Amateur Athletic Association webpage.

=== Boys (U-20) ===
Event	Gold		Silver		Bronze	
100 metres (wind: +0.4 m/s)	Jason Rogers; Saint Kitts	10.67	Miles Walters; Nevis	11.09	Ramo Pemberton; British Virgin Islands	11.14
200 metres (wind: +0.0 m/s)	Jevon Claxton; Nevis	21.89	Jason Rogers; Saint Kitts	22.33	Ramo Pemberton; British Virgin Islands	22.78
400 metres	Jevon Claxton; Nevis	48.48	Maverick Weathered; Antigua and Barbuda	49.99	Chetal Evans; Saint Kitts	50.71
800 metres	Maverick Weathered; Antigua and Barbuda	2:00.08	Seymour Walters; U.S. Virgin Islands	2:00.41	Ricky Gumbs; U.S. Virgin Islands	2:05.33
1500 metres	Juan Robles; U.S. Virgin Islands	4:17.10	Seymour Walters; U.S. Virgin Islands	4:20.50	Triscan Hendrickson; Saint Kitts	4:25.60
5000 metres^{†}	Juan Robles; U.S. Virgin Islands	16:50.51	Kyron Corea; U.S. Virgin Islands	17:57.99	Kashka Forbes; Nevis	18:10.53
High jump	Rashawn Shabaaz; Antigua and Barbuda	1.95m	Kelvin Samuel; British Virgin Islands	1.92m	Decastro Walbrook; Antigua and Barbuda	1.88m
Long jump	Joseph Pemberton; Saint Kitts	7.30m	Miguel Browne; Saint Kitts	6.84m	Decastro Walbrook; Antigua and Barbuda	6.83m
Triple jump^{†}	Vincent Walters; Antigua and Barbuda	14.29m	Arthur Ward; Anguilla	14.19m	Kareem Edwards; Antigua and Barbuda	13.73m
Shot put	Dion Samuel; Saint Kitts	13.86m	Allan Farara; Montserrat	13.16m	Rohan Jeffers; Nevis	12.01m
Discus throw	Dion Samuel; Saint Kitts	33.68m	Rohan Jeffers; Nevis	30.46m	Jonathan Dutil; Nevis	30.32m
Javelin throw^{†}	Kelvin Samuel; British Virgin Islands	45.12m	Chetal Evans; Saint Kitts	45.04m	Joseph Pemberton; Saint Kitts	38.69m
4 x 100 metres relay	British Virgin Islands; Norvin Smith; Ramo Pemberton; Micheal Buttler; Keron Stoute	43.04	Saint Kitts; Vernelle Hodge; Jason Rogers; Chetal Evans; Miguel Browne	43.62	United States Virgin Islands; Virgil Campbell; Julio Hodge; Christopher Wilson; Ricky Gumbs	43.82
4 x 400 metres relay^{†}	British Virgin Islands; Ramo Pemberton; Keron Stoute; Alliston Blyden; Micheal Buttler	3:28.77	Nevis; Trevorne Nisbett; Javid Stapelton; Jevon Claxton; Miles Walters	3:28.78		

^{†}: Open event for both U20 and U17 athletes.

=== Girls (U-20) ===
Event	Gold		Silver		Bronze	
100 metres (wind: -1.8 m/s)	Meritzer Williams; Saint Kitts	11.75	Tameka Williams; Saint Kitts	12.01	Ashley Kelly; British Virgin Islands	12.51
200 metres (wind: -2.6 m/s)	Meritzer Williams; Saint Kitts	23.90	Tameka Williams; Saint Kitts	24.67	Ashley Kelly; British Virgin Islands	25.02
400 metres	Chantel Malone; British Virgin Islands	54.58	Ashley Kelly; British Virgin Islands	54.69	Davanna Claxton; Saint Kitts	1:02.06
800 metres	Samantha John; British Virgin Islands	2:16.14	Ninfa Bernard; U.S. Virgin Islands	2:20.16	Bianca Dougan; British Virgin Islands	2:24.81
1500 metres	Ninfa Bernard; U.S. Virgin Islands	5:06.73	Bianca Dougan; British Virgin Islands	5:38.39		
3000 metres^{†}	Kenryca Francis; Antigua and Barbuda	10:34.47	Jonicia Richardson; Anguilla	11:38.21	Rosalie Pringle; Saint Kitts	11:49.09
High jump	Chantel Malone; British Virgin Islands	1.65m	Seanna Jack; British Virgin Islands	1.57m	Shsandor Wilkinson; Saint Kitts	1.52m
Long jump	Chantel Malone; British Virgin Islands	6.09m (wind: +1.8 m/s)	Sheriffa Whyte; Saint Kitts	5.94m w (wind: +2.9 m/s)	Tameka Williams; Saint Kitts	5.53m (wind: +0.0 m/s)
Triple jump^{†}	Chantel Malone; British Virgin Islands	12.45m	Kanishque Todman; British Virgin Islands	10.46m		
Shot put	Shearima Stanley; Saint Kitts	9.53m	Tesril Nisbett; Nevis	9.42m	Latoya Jones; Nevis	8.37m
Discus throw	Shearima Stanley; Saint Kitts	27.34m	Tesril Nisbett; Nevis	22.21m	Seanna Jack; British Virgin Islands	19.97m
Javelin throw^{†}	Tesril Nisbett; Nevis	27.88m	Andrea Wynter; U.S. Virgin Islands	26.00m	Shearima Stanley; Saint Kitts	24.76m
4 x 100 metres relay	Saint Kitts; Meritzer Williams; Tameka Williams; Sheriffa Whyte; Marecia Pemberton	44.68				

^{†}: Open event for both U20 and U17 athletes.

=== Boys (U-17) ===
Event	Gold		Silver		Bronze	
100 metres (wind: -1.2 m/s)	Lestrod Roland; Saint Kitts	11.27	Royston Queeley; Nevis; Nital Chavez; Saint Kitts	11.36		
200 metres (wind: -1.5 m/s)	Lester Ryan; Montserrat	22.79	Lestrod Roland; Saint Kitts	23.00	Jevonte Croal; British Virgin Islands	23.11
400 metres	Lestrod Roland; Saint Kitts	51.51	Trevorne Nisbett; Nevis	53.07	Shaquille Edwards; U.S. Virgin Islands	55.10
800 metres	Javid Stapelton; Nevis	2:05.18	Kashka Forbes; Nevis	2:08.20	Yanick Henderson; Saint Kitts	2:11.39
1500 metres	Kashka Forbes; Nevis	4:27.27	Javid Stapelton; Nevis	4:28.71	Yanick Henderson; Saint Kitts	4:39.12
High jump	Givan Bass; Saint Kitts	1.72m	Brandon Fahie; British Virgin Islands	1.72m	Yaw-Micheal David; Nevis	1.67m
Long jump	Givan Bass; Saint Kitts	6.82m (wind: NWI)	Emmette Thompson; Anguilla	6.50m w (wind: +2.4 m/s)	Jevonte Croal; British Virgin Islands	6.47m (wind: +0.8 m/s)
Shot put	Givan Bass; Saint Kitts	12.20m	Royston Queeley; Nevis	11.40m	Lonzo Wilkinson; Saint Kitts	11.33m
Discus throw	Stephan Ryan; Anguilla	28.68m	Givan Bass; Saint Kitts	23.50m	Lonzo Wilkinson; Saint Kitts	22.33m
4 x 100 metres relay	Saint Kitts; Nital Chavez; Lestrod Roland; Givan Bass; Lonzo Wilkinson	44.68	British Virgin Islands; Jevonte Croal; Jamoi Penn; Teymaul Huggins; Norville Carey	46.25	Nevis; Royston Queeley; Trevorne Nisbett; Yaw-Micheal David; Javid Stapelton	1:05.76

=== Girls (U-17) ===
Event	Gold		Silver		Bronze	
100 metres (wind: -0.5 m/s)	Darneita Robinson; British Virgin Islands	12.23	Kaetia Maduro; British Virgin Islands	12.66	Siana Douglas; Saint Kitts	12.68
200 metres (wind: -1.7 m/s)	Britney Wattley; British Virgin Islands	24.92	Darneita Robinson; British Virgin Islands	25.28	Siana Douglas; Saint Kitts	26.05
400 metres	Vanessa Benett; Saint Kitts	1:01.53	Tarika Warner; British Virgin Islands	1:02.20	Romisha Malone; Nevis	1:05.54
800 metres	Kenryca Francis; Antigua and Barbuda	2:20.30	Rozel Liburd; Nevis	2:27.95	Jonicia Richardson; Anguilla	2:27.96
1500 metres	Kenryca Francis; Antigua and Barbuda	4:53.58	Jonicia Richardson; Anguilla	5:17.16	Rosalie Pringle; Saint Kitts	5:30.62
High jump (tie)	Israel Ramsey; Nevis	1.65m	Trefesanna White; Saint Kitts	1.56m	Marissa Malone; British Virgin Islands; Queneala Bradshaw; Saint Kitts; Kanishque Todman; British Virgin Islands	1.47m
Long jump	Queneala Bradshaw; Saint Kitts	5.58m	Kanishque Todman; British Virgin Islands	5.26m	Israel Ramsey; Nevis	5.23m
Shot put	Rochella Challenger; Saint Kitts	10.33m	Anisha Douglas; British Virgin Islands	9.10m	Andrea Wynter; U.S. Virgin Islands	9.05m
Discus throw	Rochella Challenger; Saint Kitts	31.48m	Teresa Daniel; Nevis	25.14m	Anisha Douglas; British Virgin Islands	24.94m
4 x 100 metres relay	British Virgin Islands; Darneita Robinson; Kaetia Maduro; Britney Wattley; Kanishque Todman	47.86	Saint Kitts; Trefesanna White; Vanessa Benett; Siana Douglas; Queneala Bradshaw	49.89	Nevis; Ariann Maynard; Israel Ramsey; Romisha Malone; Kereesha Powell	50.10

== Medal table (unofficial) ==
* Host nation (British Virgin Islands)

Rank	Nation	Gold	Silver	Bronze	Total
1	Saint Kitts	19	12	16	47
2	British Virgin Islands*	11	12	11	34
3	Nevis	6	12	9	27
4	Antigua and Barbuda	6	1	3	10
5	U.S. Virgin Islands	3	5	4	12
6	Anguilla	1	4	1	6
7	Montserrat	1	1	0	2
Totals (7 entries)		47	47	44	138

== Team trophies ==
The scores for the team trophy were published.

The host country is highlighted in lavender blue

Rank	Nation	Points
1st place, gold medalist(s)	Saint Kitts	140.33
2	British Virgin Islands	89.67
3	Nevis	74
4	Antigua and Barbuda	36
5	U.S. Virgin Islands	29
6	Anguilla	18
7	Montserrat	8

== Participation ==
According to an unofficial count, 102 athletes from 7 countries participated.

- Anguilla (6)
- Antigua and Barbuda (8)
- British Virgin Islands (27)
- Montserrat (4)
- Nevis (19)
- Saint Kitts (27)
- U.S. Virgin Islands (11)
