= 2001 Leeward Islands Junior Championships in Athletics =

I Leeward Islands Junior/Youth Championships
- Dates: May 5–6
- Host city: Road Town, Tortola, British Virgin Islands
- Venue: A. O. Shirley Recreation Ground
- Level: Junior and Youth
- Events: 44 (13 junior boys, 11 junior girls, 10 youth boys, 10 youth girls)

The 2001 Leeward Islands Junior Championships in Athletics took place on May 5–6, 2001. The event was held at the A. O. Shirley Recreation Ground in Road Town, Tortola, British Virgin Islands.

A total of 44 events were contested, 23 by boys and 21 by girls.

== Medal summary ==
Medal winners can be found on the LIAA webpage courtesy Dean H. Greenaway from the British Virgin Islands Athletics Association.

=== Boys (U-20) ===
Event	Gold		Silver		Bronze	
100 metres (wind: m/s)	Delwayne Delaney; Saint Kitts	11.33	Travis Adams; Saint Kitts	11.55	Kamil Francis; U.S. Virgin Islands	11.73
200 metres (wind: m/s)	Kevon Pierre; Nevis	22.31	Delwayne Delaney; Saint Kitts	22.74	Travis Adams; Saint Kitts	23.46
400 metres	Kevon Pierre; Nevis	49.52	Bernard Etinoff; Antigua and Barbuda	51.55	Kevin Maynard; U.S. Virgin Islands	51.83
800 metres	Stuart Ward; Saint Kitts	2:02.91	Kevin Maynard; U.S. Virgin Islands	2:04.87	Careem Joseph; Antigua and Barbuda	2:06.89
1500 metres	Stuart Ward; Saint Kitts	4:27.39	Careem Joseph; Antigua and Barbuda	4:30.16	Jermaine Bryan; British Virgin Islands	4:43.64
5000 metres^{†}	Linden Peters; British Virgin Islands	18:53.4	Jermaine Bryan; British Virgin Islands	19:06.0	Dwayne Allen; U.S. Virgin Islands	19:35.9
High jump	Eston Williams; Saint Kitts	1.73	Edmund Paul; Sint Maarten	1.70	Jamion Brookes; Saint Kitts	1.70
Long jump	Jamion Brookes; Saint Kitts	6.55	Chester Williams; Antigua and Barbuda	6.52	Peter Charles; Antigua and Barbuda	6.30
Triple jump^{†}	Ayata Joseph; Antigua and Barbuda	13.94	Eston Williams; Saint Kitts	13.34	Alison Potter; British Virgin Islands	13.33
Shot put	Eric Mathias; British Virgin Islands	11.60	Michael Browne; U.S. Virgin Islands	11.23	Lesroy Browne; Saint Kitts	10.95
Discus throw	Eric Mathias; British Virgin Islands	40.20	Leroy Thomas; British Virgin Islands	31.78	Shawn Warner; Nevis	31.76
Javelin throw	Abdul Wattley; Sint Maarten	39.90m	Lesroy Browne; Saint Kitts	39.80	Shawn Warner; Nevis	39.80
4 x 400 metres relay^{†}	Saint Kitts; Kemroy Percival; Anevial Dias; Delwayne Delaney; Stuart Ward	3:29.86	Antigua and Barbuda; Bernard Etinoff; Chet Gomes; Peter Charles; Careem Joseph	3:33.78	Nevis; Gerani George; Cassto Julius; Kevon Pierre; Robert Morton	3:34.56

^{†}: Open event for both U20 and U17 athletes.

=== Girls (U-20) ===
Event	Gold		Silver		Bronze	
100 metres (wind: m/s)	Tiandra Ponteen; Saint Kitts	12.21	Virgil Hodge; Saint Kitts	12.37	Tanika Liburd; Nevis	12.88
200 metres (wind: m/s)	Tiandra Ponteen; Saint Kitts	24.78	Virgil Hodge; Saint Kitts	25.46	Tanika Liburd; Nevis	26.51
400 metres	Tiandra Ponteen; Saint Kitts	55.79	Sherma Aurelin; U.S. Virgin Islands	59.94	Nathandra John; Saint Kitts	60.70
3000 metres^{†}	Janil Williams; Antigua and Barbuda	11:14.9	Celelisa Maloney; Antigua and Barbuda	12:04.3	Martha Ramirez; British Virgin Islands	13:53.9
High jump	Tanika Liburd; Nevis	1.53m	Germaine Buchanan; Saint Kitts	1.48m	Samantha Hughes; Anguilla	1.48m
Long jump	Tanika Liburd; Nevis	5.07	Sindy Nathan; Saint Kitts	5.04	Miranda Bobb; Nevis	4.82
Triple jump^{†}	Nadia Edwards; Anguilla	10.44	Sindy Nathan; Saint Kitts	10.42	Nathandra John; Saint Kitts	10.16
Shot put	Valerie Connor; Saint Kitts	9.85	Tanika Liburd; Nevis	9.54	Nadia Collins; British Virgin Islands	9.48
Discus throw	Valerie Connor; Saint Kitts	29.66	Nadia Collins; British Virgin Islands	23.06	Cindy Nathan; Saint Kitts	19.15
Javelin throw	Valerie Connor; Saint Kitts	27.07	Nadia Collins; British Virgin Islands	22.57	Germaine Buchanan; Saint Kitts	17.07
4 x 400 metres relay^{†}	Antigua and Barbuda; Stephanie Jones; Janil Williams; Celsia Maloney; Andrea Jno-Baptiste	4:00.47	Saint Kitts; Nekesha Jeffers; Virgil Hodge; Nathandra John; Tiandra Ponteen	4:09.51	United States Virgin Islands; Xiomara Gomez; Natalie O'Neal; Evelise Gomez; Sherida Aurelien	4:15.68

^{†}: Open event for both U20 and U17 athletes.

=== Boys (U-17) ===
Event	Gold		Silver		Bronze	
100 metres (wind: m/s)	Jamie Henry; Saint Kitts	11.1 (ht)	Rashid Hodge; Saint Kitts	11.2 (ht)	Alison 'Al' Potter; British Virgin Islands	11.7 (ht)
200 metres (wind: m/s)	Jamie Henry; Saint Kitts	22.5 (ht)	Robert Morton; Nevis	23.0 (ht)	Chet Gomes; Antigua and Barbuda	23.4 (ht)
400 metres	Ackim Lewis; British Virgin Islands	52.88	Chet Gomes; Antigua and Barbuda	53.38	Khalid Brookes; Anguilla	53.86
800 metres	Jerome Toussaint; Saint Kitts	2:09.2	Amalee Lochart; U.S. Virgin Islands	2:12.4	Keith Gumbs; Anguilla	2:13.9
1500 metres	Jerome Toussaint; Saint Kitts	4:39.49	Amalee Lochart; U.S. Virgin Islands	4:45.40	Dulani Phillip; Nevis	4:45.42
High jump	Alison 'Al' Potter; British Virgin Islands	1.73	Eldrin Richardson; Saint Kitts	1.70	Tarik Bradshaw; Saint Kitts	1.70
Long jump	Jason Isaac; Saint Kitts	6.33	Ayata Joseph; Antigua and Barbuda	6.17	McLean Fraser; Nevis	6.15
Shot put	Romeo Brown; Sint Maarten	10.97	McLean Fraser; Nevis	10.40	Eldrin Richardson; Saint Kitts	9.80
Discus throw	Romeo Brown; Sint Maarten	33.68	Nichols Charles; British Virgin Islands	29.38	Andrick Vigilant; British Virgin Islands	27.32
Javelin throw	Romeo Brown; Sint Maarten	38.77	Anevial Dias; Saint Kitts	34.99	Randolph McDowall; British Virgin Islands	28.70

=== Girls (U-17) ===
Event	Gold		Silver		Bronze	
100 metres (wind: m/s)	Evelise Gomez; U.S. Virgin Islands	12.73	Celeste Thomas; Antigua and Barbuda	12.84	Chandora Codrington; Antigua and Barbuda	12.97
200 metres (wind: m/s)	Evelise Gomez; U.S. Virgin Islands	26.24	Julieta Johnson; Saint Kitts	27.21	Chandora Codrington; Antigua and Barbuda	27.27
400 metres	Andrea Baptiste; Antigua and Barbuda	61.51	Stephanie Jones; Antigua and Barbuda	62.23	Nickesha Jeffers; Saint Kitts	63.71
800 metres	Janil Williams; Antigua and Barbuda	2:24.6	Celisa Maloney; Antigua and Barbuda	2:31.4	Audra Rogers; Anguilla	2:36.4
1500 metres	Janil Williams; Antigua and Barbuda	4:58.32	Celisa Maloney; Antigua and Barbuda	5:14.11	Charley Charles; U.S. Virgin Islands	5:36.25
High jump	Rosalie Glasford; Saint Kitts	1.53m	Zelima Mills; Nevis	1.48m	Tanaysha Henry; British Virgin Islands	1.43m
Long jump	Rosalie Glasford; Saint Kitts	5.10	Nikisha Jeffers; Saint Kitts	4.80	Millisa Charles; Nevis	4.66
Shot put	Morella Dore; U.S. Virgin Islands	9.39	Zelina Mills; Nevis	8.88	Nerida Skelton; British Virgin Islands	8.18
Discus throw	Morella Dore; U.S. Virgin Islands	25.26	Nerida Skelton; British Virgin Islands	20.03	Rosalie Glasford; Saint Kitts	17.13
Javelin throw	Morella Dore; U.S. Virgin Islands	26.30	Rosalie Glasford; Saint Kitts	22.85		

== Medal table (unofficial) ==
* Host nation (British Virgin Islands)

Rank	Nation	Gold	Silver	Bronze	Total
1	Saint Kitts	19	16	11	46
2	Antigua and Barbuda	6	11	5	22
3	British Virgin Islands*	5	6	9	20
4	U.S. Virgin Islands	5	5	5	15
5	Nevis	4	5	9	18
6	Sint Maarten	4	1	0	5
7	Anguilla	1	0	4	5
Totals (7 entries)		44	44	43	131

== Team trophy ==
The scores for the team trophy were published.

The host country is highlighted in lavender blue

Rank	Nation	Points
1st place, gold medalist(s)	Saint Kitts	162
2	Antigua and Barbuda	80
3	British Virgin Islands	55
4	U.S. Virgin Islands	45
5	Nevis	37
6	Sint Maarten	34
7	Anguilla	

== Participation ==
Athletes from at least 7 countries participated.

- Anguilla
- Antigua and Barbuda
- British Virgin Islands
- Nevis
- Saint Kitts
- Sint Maarten
- U.S. Virgin Islands
