= Sint Maarten Amateur Athletic Association =

- Sport: Athletics
- Jurisdiction: Association
- President: Les Brown
- Replaced: Nederlands Antilliaanse Atletiek Unie
- (Sint Maarten)

The Sint Maarten Amateur Athletic Association is the governing body for the sport of athletics in Sint Maarten. The current president is Les Brown.

== Affiliations ==
- Leeward Islands Athletics Association (LIAA)

The Sint Maarten Amateur Athletic Association is an observer member federation for Sint Maarten in the

- Central American and Caribbean Athletic Confederation (CACAC)

The Sint Maarten Amateur Athletic Association is invited to participate in the

- CARIFTA Games
