= British Virgin Islands at the 2023 Pan American Games =

- IOC code: IVB
- NOC: British Virgin Islands Olympic Committee

in Santiago, Chile 20 October 2023 – 5 November 2023
- Competitors: 4 in 2 sports
- Flag bearer (opening): Deya Erickson
- Flag bearer (closing): Thad Lettsome
- Medals: Gold 0 Silver 0 Bronze 0 Total 0

Pan American Games appearances (overview)
- 1983; 1987; 1991; 1995; 1999; 2003; 2007; 2011; 2015; 2019; 2023; 2027

The British Virgin Islands competed at the 2023 Pan American Games in Santiago, Chile from October 20 to November 5, 2023. This was the territory's 11th appearance at the Pan American Games, having competed at every Games since making its debut in 1983.

On October 17, 2023 the British Virgin Islands Olympic Committee announced a team of four athletes (three men and one woman) competing in two sports. Track athlete Deya Erickson was the country's flagbearers during the opening ceremony. Meanwhile, sailor Thad Lettsome was the country's flagbearer during the closing ceremony.

== Competitors ==
The following is the list of number of competitors (per gender) participating at the games per sport/discipline.

Sport	Men	Women	Total
Athletics (track and field)	2	1	3
Sailing	1	0	1
Total	3	1	4

== Athletics (track and field) ==
The British Virgin Islands qualified three track and field athletes. Due to the games taking place during the off-season, many of the territory's top athletes did not compete, including 2023 world silver medalist Kyron McMaster. With Gumbs and Henry competing in the shot put, it marked the first time ever the Islands had two competitors in the same event at the Pan American Games.

Key

- Note–Ranks given for track events are within the athlete's heat only
- Q = Qualified for the next round
- q = Qualified for the next round as a fastest loser
- Bye = Athlete not required to compete in round

Track event

Athlete	Event	Semifinals		Final	
Athlete	Event	Result	Rank	Result	Rank
Deya Erickson	Women's 100 m hurdles	14.42	12	Did not advance	

Field events

Athlete	Event	Final	
Athlete	Event	Distance	Position
Djimon Gumbs	Men's discus throw	54.70	9
Djimon Gumbs	Men's shot put	NM	
Eldred Henry	Men's shot put	16.98	11

== Sailing ==
The British Virgin Islands qualified one boat for a total of one sailor. This marked the country's first boat qualified in 30 years (not including invitational spots).

Men

Athlete	Event	Opening series												Finals		
Athlete	Event	1	2	3	4	5	6	7	8	9	10	Points	Rank	M	Points	Rank
Thad Lettsome	Laser	14	~~17~~	16	14	13	15	6	14	13	12	117	14	Did not advance		

== See also ==
- British Virgin Islands at the 2024 Summer Olympics
