= Christabel Nettey =

Canadian long jumper

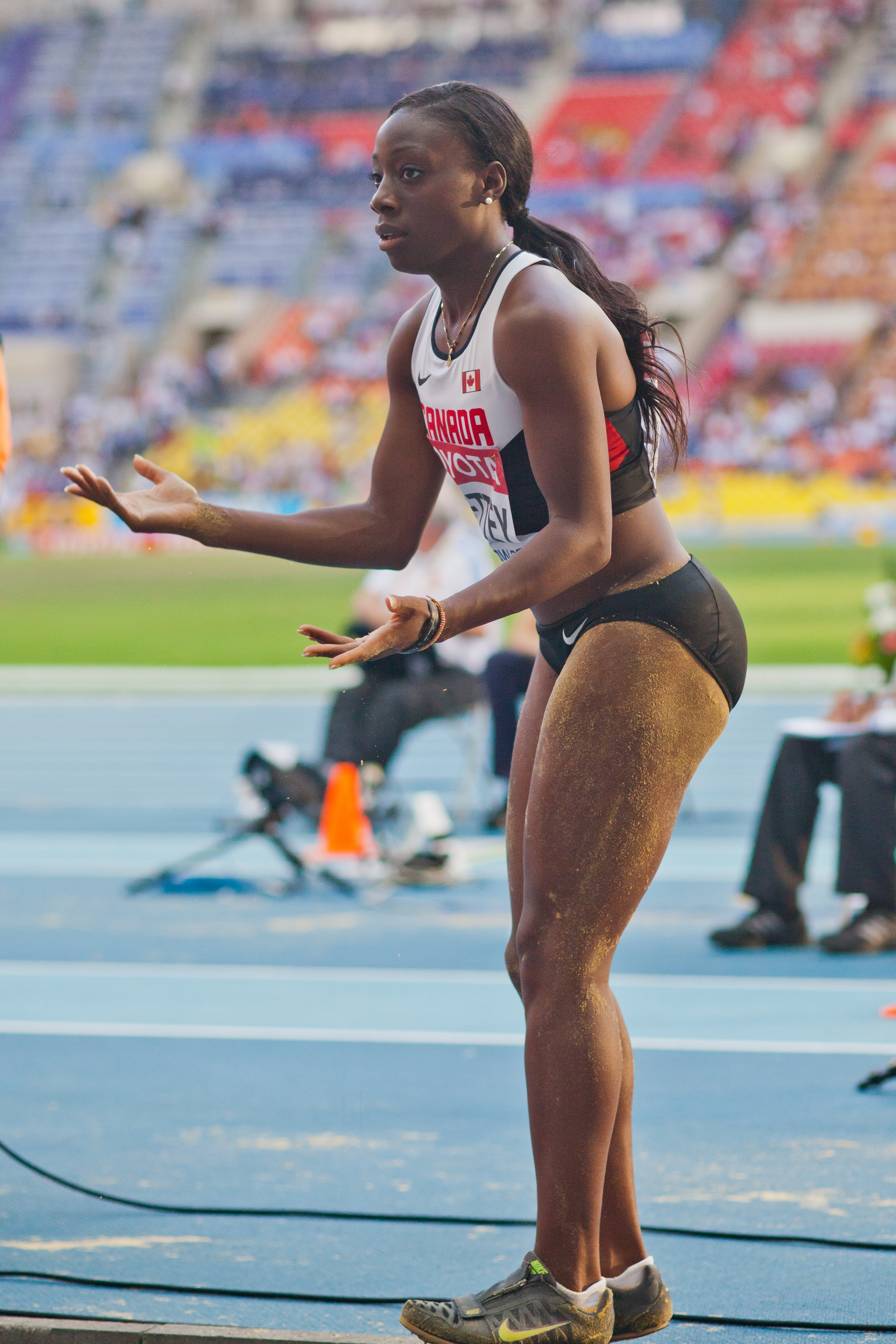
- Christabel Nettey (2013 World Championships in Athletics)

Personal information
- Born: June 2, 1991 (age 35) Brampton, Ontario, Canada
- Height: 1.62 m (5 ft 4 in)
- Weight: 57 kg (126 lb)

Sport
- Sport: Track and field
- Event: Long jump
- College team: Arizona State University

Achievements and titles
- Personal bests: 6.99 NR (2015)
Medal record
Women's athletics
Representing Canada
Commonwealth Games
Gold medal – first place	2018 Gold Coast	Long jump
Bronze medal – third place	2014 Glasgow	Long jump
Pan American Games
Gold medal – first place	2015 Toronto	Long jump

Christabel Nettey (born June 2, 1991 in Brampton, Ontario) is a Canadian athlete specialising in the long jump. She is a two-time Olympian, 2016 and 2020. She has been to two Commonwealth Games, winning gold at the 2018 edition and bronze at the 2014 edition. She won gold at the 2015 Pan American Games.

== Athletic career ==
She was a gold medallist at the 2018 Commonwealth Games and the 2015 Pan American Games. She has also won bronze medals at the 2013 Jeux de la Francophonie and the 2014 Commonwealth Games. Nettey placed fourth at the 2015 World Championships in Athletics and was a member of Canada's 2016 Olympic team.

She has indoor and outdoor personal bests of 6.99 metres (indoors at the XL Galan and outdoor at the Prefontaine Classic, both in 2015). Both of these performances were Canadian records.

She attended Arizona State University and competed collegiately for the Arizona State Sun Devils. Her best performance for them was a second-place finish at the NCAA Women's Division I Indoor Track and Field Championship in 2013.

Nettey has qualified to compete at the 2020 Summer Olympics.

== Personal life ==
Nettey was born in Ontario, Canada to Eustace and Genevieve Nettey who are both from Ghana.

== International competitions ==
Representing Canada
Year	Competition	Venue	Position	Event	Notes
2007	World Youth Championships	Ostrava, Czech Republic	8th	100 m hurdles (76.2 cm)	14.42
2007	World Youth Championships	Ostrava, Czech Republic	14th (q)	Long jump	5.88 m
2007	World Youth Championships	Ostrava, Czech Republic	3rd	Medley relay	2:09.08
2009	Pan American Junior Championships	Port of Spain, Trinidad and Tobago	2nd	Long jump	6.05 m
2012	NACAC U23 Championships	Irapuato, Mexico	1st	Long jump	6.18 m
2013	Universiade	Kazan, Russia	14th (q)	Long jump	6.22 m
2013	World Championships	Moscow, Russia	20th (q)	Long jump	6.47 m
2013	Jeux de la Francophonie	Nice, France	3rd	Long jump	6.63 m
2014	Commonwealth Games	Glasgow, United Kingdom	3rd	Long jump	6.49 m
2015	Pan American Games	Toronto, Canada	1st	Long jump	6.90 m
2015	World Championships	Beijing, China	4th	Long jump	6.95 m
2016	Olympic Games	Rio de Janeiro, Brazil	20th (q)	Long jump	6.37 m
2017	World Championships	London, United Kingdom	19th (q)	Long jump	6.36 m
2018	World Indoor Championships	Birmingham, United Kingdom	7th	Long jump	6.63 m
2018	Commonwealth Games	Gold Coast, Australia	1st	Long jump	6.84 m
2019	Pan American Games	Lima, Peru	14th	Long jump	5.96 m
2021	Olympic Games	Tokyo, Japan	22nd (q)	Long jump	6.29 m
2022	World Championships	Eugene, United States	17th (q)	Long jump	6.50 m
2022	NACAC Championships	Freeport, Bahamas	2nd	Long jump	6.46 m

== Collegiate competitions ==
Year	Competition	Venue	Position	Event	Notes
Representing Arizona State University
2013	NCAA Outdoor Championships	Eugene, Oregon; University of Oregon	13th	Long jump	6.24 m (20 ft 5 1/2 in)
2013	NCAA Indoor Championships	Fayetteville, Arkansas; Randal Tyson Track Center	2nd	Long jump	6.55 m (21 ft 5 3/4 in)
2012	NCAA Outdoor Championships	Des Moines, Iowa; Drake Stadium	8th	Long jump	6.37 m (20 ft 10 3/4 in)
2012	NCAA Outdoor Championships	Des Moines, Iowa; Drake Stadium	16th	4 × 100 m relay	44.84
2012	NCAA Indoor Championships	Nampa, Idaho; Ford Idaho Center	11th	Long jump	6.15 m (20 ft 2 in)
2011	NCAA Outdoor Championships	Des Moines, Iowa; Drake Stadium	7th	Long jump	6.47 m (21 ft 2 1/2 in)
2011	NCAA Indoor Championships	College Station, Texas; Gilliam Indoor Track Stadium	17th	Long jump	5.13 m (16 ft 9 3/4 in)
2010	NCAA Outdoor Championships	Eugene, Oregon; Hayward Field	16th	4x100	44.96
2010	NCAA Indoor Championships	Fayetteville, Arkansas; Randal Tyson Track Center	17th	Long jump	6.04 m (19 ft 9 3/4 in)
