= British Virgin Islands at the 2003 Pan American Games =

- IOC code: IVB
- NOC: BVI Olympic Committee

in Santo Domingo 1–17 August 2003
- Flag bearer: Chris Rice
- Medals Ranked 33rd: Gold 0 Silver 0 Bronze 0 Total 0

Pan American Games appearances (overview)
- 1983; 1987; 1991; 1995; 1999; 2003; 2007; 2011; 2015; 2019; 2023; 2027

The British Virgin Islands competed at the 14th Pan American Games held in Santo Domingo, Dominican Republic from August 1 to August 17, 2003.

== See also ==
- British Virgin Islands at the 2004 Summer Olympics
