= Athletics at the 2019 Pan American Games – Women's long jump =

Women's long jump at the 2019 Pan American Games
- Venue: Athletics Stadium
- Dates: August 6
- Competitors: 14 from 12 nations
- Winning distance: 6.68 m

Medalists
Gold medal	Chantel Malone; British Virgin Islands
Silver medal	Keturah Orji; United States
Bronze medal	Tissanna Hickling; Jamaica

The women's long jump competition of the athletics events at the 2019 Pan American Games took place on August 6 at the Estadio Nacional del Perú (National Stadium of Peru) in Lima. The defending Pan American Games champion was Christabel Nettey from Canada. The gold medal was won by Chantel Malone of the British Virgin Islands.

== Records ==
Prior to this competition, the existing world and Pan American Games records were as follows:

World record	Galina Chistyakova (URS)	7.52 m	Leningrad, Soviet Union	June 11, 1988
Pan American Games record	Jackie Joyner-Kersee (USA)	7.45 m	Indianapolis, United States	August 13, 1987

== Schedule ==
Date	Time	Round
August 6, 2019	17:30	Final

== Results ==
All times shown are in meters.

KEY:	q	Fastest non-qualifiers	Q	Qualified	NR	National record	PB	Personal best	SB	Seasonal best	DQ	Disqualified

=== Final ===
The results were as follows:

Rank	Name	Nationality	#1	#2	#3	#4	#5	#6	Mark	Notes
1st place, gold medalist(s)	Chantel Malone	British Virgin Islands	6.68	6.60	6.52	x	6.52	x	6.68	-0.3
2nd place, silver medalist(s)	Keturah Orji	United States	6.30	6.50	6.51	6.66	6.45	x	6.66	+0.4
3rd place, bronze medalist(s)	Tissanna Hickling	Jamaica	6.59	6.18	6.21	6.28	6.50	6.42	6.59	+0.4
4	Nathalee Aranda	Panama	6.55	6.24	x	6.35	6.26	6.18	6.55	+0.1 SB
5	Caterine Ibargüen	Colombia	6.24	6.54	6.46	6.51	6.41	6.39	6.54	+0.9
6	Adriana Rodríguez	Cuba	x	6.22	6.34	6.17	6.32	6.49	6.49	+0.3
7	Chanice Porter	Jamaica	6.31	6.38	x	6.44	6.34	6.41	6.44	+0.6
8	Aliyah Whisby	United States	6.11	6.36	2.99	3.69	6.11	–	6.36	+0.5
9	Paola Mautino	Peru	6.02	5.85	6.30				6.30	+0.5
10	Eliane Martins	Brazil	6.10	x	6.19				6.19	+0.1
11	Yuliana Angulo	Ecuador	6.18	6.07	6.18				6.18	+0.8
12	Aries Sánchez	Venezuela	6.15	6.13	6.12				6.15	+1.3
13	Macarena Reyes	Chile	6.14	x	6.10				6.14	+0.6
14	Christabel Nettey	Canada	5.96	5.84	5.87				5.96	-0.4
