= British Virgin Islands at the 2011 Pan American Games =

- IOC code: IVB
- NOC: BVI Olympic Committee

in Guadalajara 14–30 October 2011
- Competitors: 3 in 1 sport
- Flag bearer: Keron Stoute
- Medals: Gold 0 Silver 0 Bronze 0 Total 0

Pan American Games appearances (overview)
- 1983; 1987; 1991; 1995; 1999; 2003; 2007; 2011; 2015; 2019; 2023

The British Virgin Islands competed at the 2011 Pan American Games iheld n Guadalajara, Mexico from October 14 to 30, 2011. The British Virgin Islands qualified just three athletes, the smallest of the forty-two nations competing.

== Athletics ==
The British Virgin Islands sent three athletes.

Men

Athlete	Event	Preliminaries		Semifinals		Final	
Athlete	Event	Result	Rank	Result	Rank	Result	Rank
Omar Jones	Javelin throw					60.24	14th
Keron Stoute	High jump					2.05	15th
Jevonte Croal	Long jump	6.70	10th			did not advance	
