= British Virgin Islands at the 2015 Pan American Games =

- IOC code: IVB
- NOC: BVI Olympic Committee

in Toronto, Canada 10–26 July 2015
- Competitors: 6 in 3 sports
- Flag bearer (opening): Joseph Chapman
- Flag bearer (closing): Chantel Malone
- Medals: Gold 0 Silver 0 Bronze 0 Total 0

Pan American Games appearances (overview)
- 1983; 1987; 1991; 1995; 1999; 2003; 2007; 2011; 2015; 2019; 2023

The British Virgin Islands competed at the 2015 Pan American Games in Toronto, Ontario, Canada from July 10 to 26, 2015. The Chef de mission of the team was Xavier Dag Samuels.

A final squad of six athletes (two men and four women) in three sports was announced on June 18, 2015 by the British Virgin Islands Olympic Committee. This marked the doubling of the number of athletes the nation sent to the last edition of the games in 2011. Squash athlete Joseph Chapman was the flagbearer for the team during the opening ceremony.

The British Virgin Islands did not medal at the games, continuing its drought as one of two nations (along with Aruba) to never win a Pan American Games medal.

== Competitors ==
The following table lists British Virgin Islands's delegation per sport and gender.

Sport	Men	Women	Total
Athletics	1	3	4
Squash	1	0	1
Swimming	0	1	1
Total	2	4	6

== Athletics ==
The British Virgin Islands qualified four athletes.

Men
Field Events

Athlete	Event	Final	
Athlete	Event	Distance	Rank
Eldred Henry	Shot Put	16.47	12
Eldred Henry	Discus Throw	NM	

Women
Track events

Athlete	Event	Heat		Semi Final		Final	
Athlete	Event	Time	Rank	Time	Rank	Time	Rank
Tahesia Harrigan-Scott	100 m	11.19	11 Q	11.18	9	did not advance	
Karene King	200 m	24.16	22	did not advance			

Field Events

Athlete	Event	Final	
Athlete	Event	Distance	Rank
Chantel Malone	Long jump	6.62 SB	5

Key

- Note – Ranks given for track events are for the entire round
- Q = Qualified for the next round
- SB = Seasonal Best
- N/A = Round not applicable for the event
- NM = No mark

== Squash ==
The British Virgin Islands received a reallocated men's wildcard slot.

Athlete	Event	Round of 32	Round of 16	Quarterfinal	Semifinal	Final
Athlete	Event	Opposition Result	Opposition Result	Opposition Result	Opposition Result	Opposition Result
Joseph Chapman	Men's singles	Escudero (PER); L (7–11, 7–11, 2–11)	did not advance			

== Swimming ==
The British Virgin Islands received a wild card to enter one female swimmer.

Key

- Note – Ranks given are for the entire round

Women

Athlete	Event	Heat		Final	
Athlete	Event	Time	Rank	Time	Rank
Elinah Phillip	50 m freestyle	27.37	21	did not advance	
Elinah Phillip	100 m freestyle	1:00.76	24	did not advance	

== See also ==
- British Virgin Islands at the 2016 Summer Olympics
