= Lestrod Roland =

Kittitian sprinter (born 1992)

Personal information
- Nationality: Saint Kitts and Nevis
- Born: 5 September 1992 (age 33) U.S. Virgin Islands
- Height: 1.65 m (5 ft 5 in)
- Weight: 14954 kg (119 lb)

Sport
- Sport: Running
- Events: 100 metres, 200 metres

Achievements and titles
- Personal best: 100 m: 10.30 s (Basseterre 2012) 200 m: 20.60 s (Basseterre 2013)
- Updated on 29 January 2015

Lestrod Roland (born 5 September 1992) is a Kittitian sprinter. He competed for the Saint Kitts and Nevis team in the 4 × 100 metres relay at the 2012 Summer Olympics; the team placed sixth in its heat with a time of 38.41 seconds and did not qualify for the final.

== Personal bests ==
Event	Result	Venue	Date
Outdoor
100 m	10.28 s (wind: +1.0 m/s)	Lubbock, United States	3 May 2014
200 m	20.60 s (wind: +1.8 m/s)	Basseterre, Saint Kitts and Nevis	9 June 2013
400 m	46.41 s	Basseterre, Saint Kitts and Nevis	22 June 2014
Indoor
60 m	6.84 s	Fayetteville, United States	14 February 2014
200 m	21.28 s	Fayetteville, United States	15 February 2014
400 m	51.78 s	Houston, United States	15 January 2010

== Competition record ==
Year	Competition	Venue	Position	Event	Notes
Representing Saint Kitts and Nevis
2008	CARIFTA Games (U17)	Basseterre, Saint Kitts and Nevis	5th (h)	200 m	22.88 (wind: -0.9 m/s)
2008	CARIFTA Games (U17)	Basseterre, Saint Kitts and Nevis	7th	400 m	51.29
2008	CARIFTA Games (U17)	Basseterre, Saint Kitts and Nevis	4th	4 × 100 m relay	43.34
2008	CARIFTA Games (U17)	Basseterre, Saint Kitts and Nevis	4th	4 × 400 m relay	3:37.40
2008	Leeward Islands Junior Championships (U20)	Road Town, British Virgin Islands	1st	100m	11.27 (wind: -1.2 m/s)
2008	Leeward Islands Junior Championships (U20)	Road Town, British Virgin Islands	2nd	200m	23.00 (wind: -1.5 m/s)
2008	Leeward Islands Junior Championships (U20)	Road Town, British Virgin Islands	1st	400m	51.51
2008	Leeward Islands Junior Championships (U20)	Road Town, British Virgin Islands	1st	4 × 100 m relay	44.68
2009	CARIFTA Games (U20)	Vieux Fort, Saint Lucia	2nd (h)	400m	49.44
2009	CARIFTA Games (U20)	Vieux Fort, Saint Lucia	4th	4 × 100 m relay	41.04
2009	CARIFTA Games (U20)	Vieux Fort, Saint Lucia	6th	4 × 400 m relay	3:18.23
2009	World Youth Championship	Bressanone, Italy	16th (sf)	400 m	48.61
2009	Pan American Junior Championships	Port of Spain, Trinidad and Tobago	6th (h)	200 m	22.04 (wind: +0.3 m/s)
2009	Pan American Junior Championships	Port of Spain, Trinidad and Tobago	6th (h)	400m	48.53
2009	Pan American Junior Championships	Port of Spain, Trinidad and Tobago	7th	4 × 400 m relay	3:24.32
2010	Central American and Caribbean Junior Championships (U20)	Santo Domingo, Dominican Republic	5th (h)	200m	22.23 (wind: -0.2 m/s)
2010	Central American and Caribbean Junior Championships (U20)	Santo Domingo, Dominican Republic	7th (h)	400m	50.28
2011	CARIFTA Games (U20)	Montego Bay, Jamaica	6th	200m	21.82 (wind: -1.1 m/s)
2011	Pan American Junior Championships	Miramar, United States	7th	200m	21.34 w (wind: +2.2 m/s)
2012	NACAC Under-23 Championships	Irapuato, Mexico	8th	100 m	10.44 (wind: +0.9 m/s)
2012	NACAC Under-23 Championships	Irapuato, Mexico	6th	200 m	20.76 (wind: -0.5 m/s)
2012	Olympic Games	London, United Kingdom	13th (h)	4 × 100 m relay	38.41
2013	Central American and Caribbean Championships	Morelia, Mexico	12th (h)	400m	48.17 A
2013	World Championships	Moscow, Russia	43rd (h)	200m	21.37 (wind: 0.0 m/s)
2013	World Championships	Moscow, Russia	13th (h)	4 × 100 m relay	38.58
2014	World Relays	Nassau, Bahamas	12th (h)^{1}	4 × 100 m relay	38.76^{1}
2014	World Relays	Nassau, Bahamas	2nd	4 × 200 m relay	1:20.51
2014	Commonwealth Games	Glasgow, United Kingdom	42nd (h)	200m	21.42 (wind: +0.9 m/s)
2014	Commonwealth Games	Glasgow, United Kingdom	27th (h)	400m	47.17
2014	NACAC U-23 Championships	Kamloops, Canada	7th	400m	47.79
2015	NACAC Championships	San José, Costa Rica	5th (sf)	400m	46.30
2017	IAAF World Relays	Nassau, Bahamas	8th (B)	4 × 100 m relay	41.07
2017	IAAF World Relays	Nassau, Bahamas	10th (h)	4 × 200 m relay	1:24.89

^{1}: Did not compete in the B final.
