= British Virgin Islands at the 1991 Pan American Games =

- IOC code: IVB
- NOC: BVI Olympic Committee

in Havana 8–18 August 1991
- Medals Ranked 27th: Gold 0 Silver 0 Bronze 0 Total 0

Pan American Games appearances (overview)
- 1983; 1987; 1991; 1995; 1999; 2003; 2007; 2011; 2015; 2019; 2023

The British Virgin Islands competed at the 11th Pan American Games held in Havana, Cuba from August 2 to August 18, 1991.

== See also ==
- British Virgin Islands at the 1992 Summer Olympics
