= Athletics at the 2015 Pan American Games – Women's long jump =

Women's long jump at the 2015 Pan American Games
- Venue: CIBC Pan Am and Parapan Am Athletics Stadium
- Dates: July 24
- Competitors: 15 from 11 nations
- Winning distance: 6.90

Medalists
Gold medal	Christabel Nettey	Canada
Silver medal	Bianca Stuart	Bahamas
Bronze medal	Sha'Keela Saunders	United States

The women's long jump competition of the athletics events at the 2015 Pan American Games took place between 23 and 24 July at the CIBC Pan Am and Parapan Am Athletics Stadium in Toronto. The defending Pan American Games champion was Maurren Maggi of Brazil. The gold medal was won by Christabel Nettey of Canada.

== Records ==
Prior to this competition, the existing world and Pan American Games records were as follows:

World record	Galina Chistyakova (URS)	7.52	Leningrad, Soviet Union	June 11, 1988
Pan American Games record	Jackie Joyner-Kersee (USA)	7.45	Indianapolis, United States	August 13, 1987

== Qualification ==
Each National Olympic Committee (NOC) was able to enter up to two entrants providing they had met the minimum standard (6.18) in the qualifying period (January 1, 2014 to June 28, 2015).

== Schedule ==
Date	Time	Round
July 24, 2015	19:25	Final

== Results ==
All results shown are in meters.

KEY:	q	Best non-qualifiers	Q	Qualified	NR	National record	PB	Personal best	SB	Seasonal best	DQ	Disqualified

=== Final ===
Rank	Name	Nationality	#1	#2	#3	#4	#5	#6	Mark	Wind	Notes
1st place, gold medalist(s)	Christabel Nettey	Canada	6.81	6.56	6.61	6.80	6.90	6.84	6.90	+1.1	
2nd place, silver medalist(s)	Bianca Stuart	Bahamas	6.32	6.37	6.57	6.69	6.64	x	6.69	+0.5	
3rd place, bronze medalist(s)	Sha'Keela Saunders	United States	6.47	6.30	6.40	6.41	x	6.66	6.66	+1.1	
4	Brianne Theisen-Eaton	Canada	6.59	6.64	6.52	6.56	6.46	6.52	6.64	+1.9	
5	Chantel Malone	British Virgin Islands	x	x	6.55	6.53	6.62	6.52	6.62	+0.9	SB
6	Akela Jones	Barbados	5.67	6.53 NR	6.28	6.51	6.60	6.22	6.60	+1.2	NR
7	Irisdaymi Herrera	Cuba	6.23	6.50	6.26	6.44	6.44	6.43	6.50	+2.3	
8	Quanesha Burks	United States	6.41	6.47	6.35	6.43	x	6.43	6.47	+1.4	
9	Keila Costa	Brazil	x	6.41	x				6.41	+2.7	
10	Eliane Martins	Brazil	x	x	6.40				6.40	+1.4	
11	Yulimar Rojas	Venezuela	x	x	6.36				6.36	+1.5	
12	Paola Mautino	Peru	6.11	6.35	5.91				6.35	+1.7	
13	Macarena Reyes	Chile	5.99	x	5.86				5.99	+0.1	
14	Yilian Durruthy	Cuba	x	5.94	5.92				5.94	+1.2	
15	Yuliana Angulo	Ecuador	x	5.76	x				5.76	+1.4	
