= Alastair Clarke =

Australian rugby league footballer

Personal information
- Full name: Alastair John Clarke
- Born: 4 May 1917 Lismore, New South Wales, Australia
- Died: 26 September 1988 (aged 71) Caringbah, New South Wales, Australia

Playing information
- Position: Hooker, Second-row
Club
Years	Team	Pld	T	G	FG	P
1942–45	St. George	13	1	0	0	3
1947–48	Canterbury-Bankstown	24	2	0	0	6
	Total	37	3	0	0	9

Alastair John Clarke (commonly spelled Alister, 1917–1988) was an Australian rugby league player who played in the 1940s.

== Career ==
Born in Lismore, New South Wales, Clarke played two seasons for St. George in 1942 and 1945, including the 1942 Grand Final.

He later shifted to Canterbury-Bankstown for two seasons in 1947–1948, and played in the 1947 Grand Final before retiring from rugby league.

== Death ==
Clarke died on 26 September 1988 aged 71.
