= Elquemedo Willett Park =

Sporting complex in the Caribbean

- Charlestown (Lesser Antilles)
- Interactive map of Elquemedo Willett Park

Ground information
- Location: Charlestown, Nevis
- Country: Saint Kitts and Nevis
- Coordinates: 17°8′06″N 62°37′34″W
- Establishment: unknown

Team information
Nevis	(1949–)
Leeward Islands	(1977–2009)
Combined Islands	(1980)
- As of 18 May 2015; Source: CricketArchive

Elquemedo T. Willett Park, known as Grove Park until 2010, is a sporting complex in Charlestown, the capital of the Caribbean island of Nevis. The venue's primary use is as a cricket ground, and it serves as a home ground for both the Nevis and Leeward Islands cricket teams (and historically also for the Combined Islands side).

== History ==
Cricket was introduced to Nevis (and the other members of the British Leeward Islands colony) in the late 19th century. Nevisians had represented Saint Kitts in the Hesketh Bell Shield (later known as the Leeward Islands Tournament) from its establishment in 1913, and Grove Park was frequently used for matches in that competition after Nevis was admitted separately in 1949. The inaugural first-class match played on the ground came in January 1977, when the Leeward Islands team played its annual fixture against the Windward Islands. Another Leewards–Windwards game was hosted in March 1979, during the 1979–80 season, and the following season the ground hosted its first Shell Shield game, with the Combined Islands playing Guyana. First-class fixtures became more common after the Leewards and Windwards teams were admitted separately to the Shell Shield for the 1980–81 season. In the seasons where no four-day match was played at Grove Park, a fixture in the West Indian domestic one-day competition was generally played instead.

During a Busta Cup match at Grove Park in February 2001, Ryan Hinds, playing for Barbados against the Leeward Islands, took 9/68, which as of May 2015 remains a record for West Indian first-class cricket. Another notable match played at the ground was the game between the Leeward Islands and Combined Campuses and Colleges (CCC) during the 2008–09 season. Both teams posted first-innings totals of over 500 runs, and each side had a player who scored a double century – Omar Phillips made 204 for CCC, and Runako Morton scored 231, a ground record, for the Leewards. That match was the second first-class game played at Grove Park during that season, the first and only time that has occurred. The most recent first-class game at the ground was played in January 2010, a neutral fixture between CCC and Barbados. The ground remains the only venue on Nevis to have hosted first-class matches.

In July 2010, Grove Park was renamed in honour of Elquemedo Willett, the first Nevisian to play for the West Indies. The renaming ceremony was a major event for the island, with several members of the island's administration participating, including the Premier of Nevis, Joseph Parry. Outside of cricket, the venue has hosted football and athletics tournaments at both national and regional levels.

== Records ==
=== First-class ===
- Highest team total: 596 all out by Leeward Islands v Combined Campuses and Colleges, 2008/09
- Lowest team total: 67 all out by Trinidad and Tobago v Leeward Islands, 1988/89
- Highest individual innings: 231 by Runako Morton for Leeward Islands v Combined Campuses and Colleges, 2008/09
- Best bowling in an innings: 9/68 by Ryan Hinds for Barbados v Leeward Islands, 2000/01

=== List A ===
- Highest team total: 220 all out by Leeward Islands v Windward Islands, 1993/94
- Lowest team total: 124 all out by Leeward Islands v Jamaica, 1987/88, and also by Leeward Islands v Trinidad and Tobago, 1991/92
- Highest individual innings: 80 by Ridley Jacobs for Leeward Islands v Windward Islands, 1993/94
- Best bowling in an innings: 4/22 by Casper Davis for Windward Islands v Leeward Islands, 1993/94

== See also ==
- List of cricket grounds in the West Indies
