= Yasco Sports Complex =

Multi-use stadium in St. John's, Antigua and Barbuda

Coordinates: 17°7′23.1387″N 61°49′59.9465″W

- Interactive map of Yasco Sports Complex
- Location: St. John's, Antigua and Barbuda
- Capacity: 1,000

Yasco Sports Complex is a multi-use stadium in St. John's, Antigua and Barbuda.

It is currently used mostly for football (soccer) matches.

The stadium holds 1,000 people.

== See also ==
- Sports venues in Antigua and Barbuda
