= Jamie Henry =

Japan international rugby union player

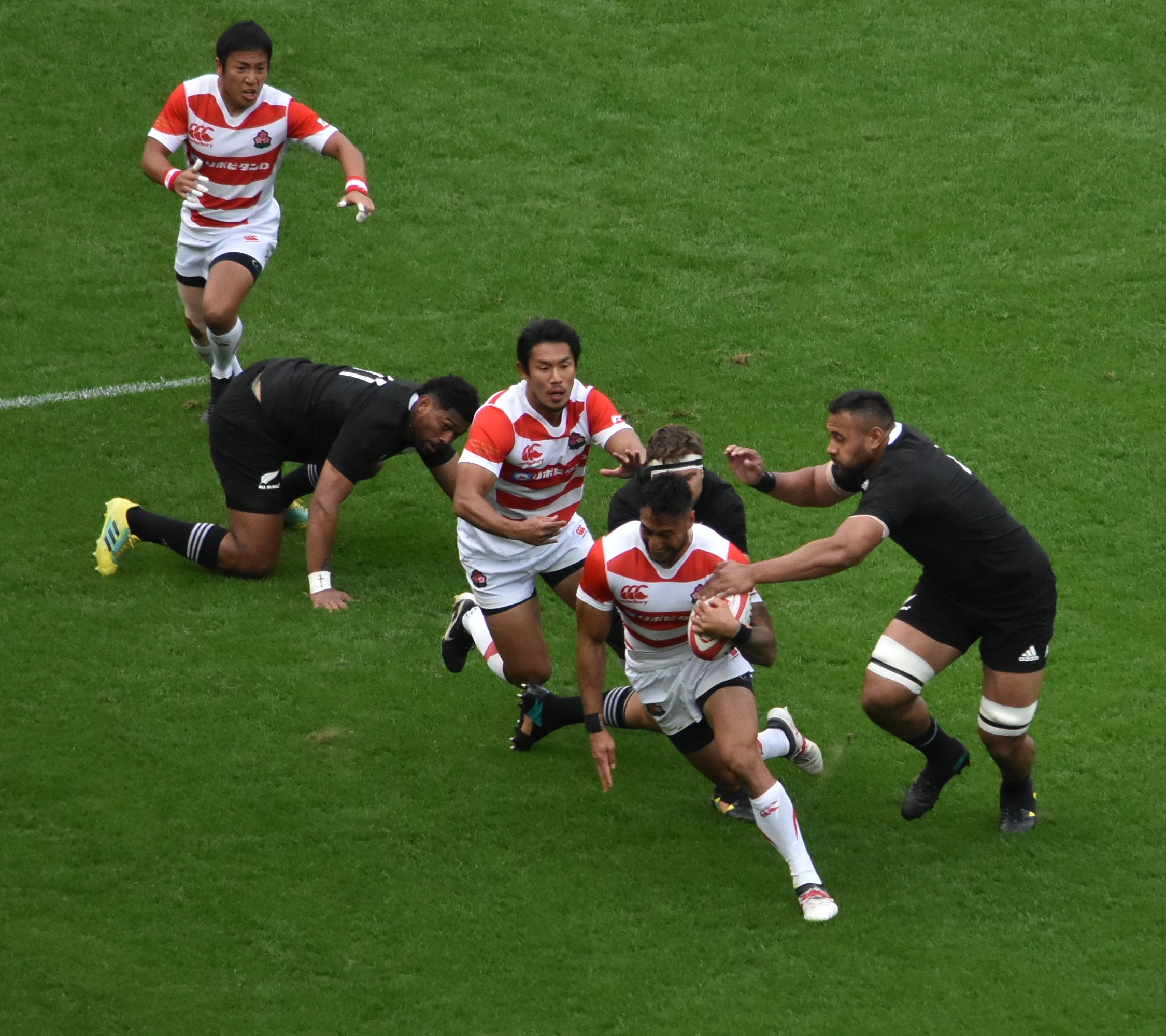
- Born: 11 March 1990 (age 36) Auckland, New Zealand
- Height: 184 cm (6 ft 0 in)
- Weight: 99 kg (15 st 8 lb; 218 lb)
- University: Rissho University

Rugby union career
Senior career
Years	Team	Apps	(Points)
2017–2023	Toyota Verblitz	49	(160)
2023–2025	Kamaishi Seawaves	22	(60)
- Correct as of 21 February 2021
Super Rugby
Years	Team	Apps	(Points)
2019	Sunwolves	4	(0)
International career
Years	Team	Apps	(Points)
2018	Japan	1	(5)
National sevens team
Years	Team		Comps
2013–2017	Japan Sevens		15
- Correct as of 21 February 2021

Jamie Henry (ジェイミーヘンリー, Jeimīhenrī; born 11 March 1990) is a New Zealand–born Japanese rugby union player who plays as a wing. He currently plays for Sunwolves in Super Rugby. He has also played international rugby league for Japan.

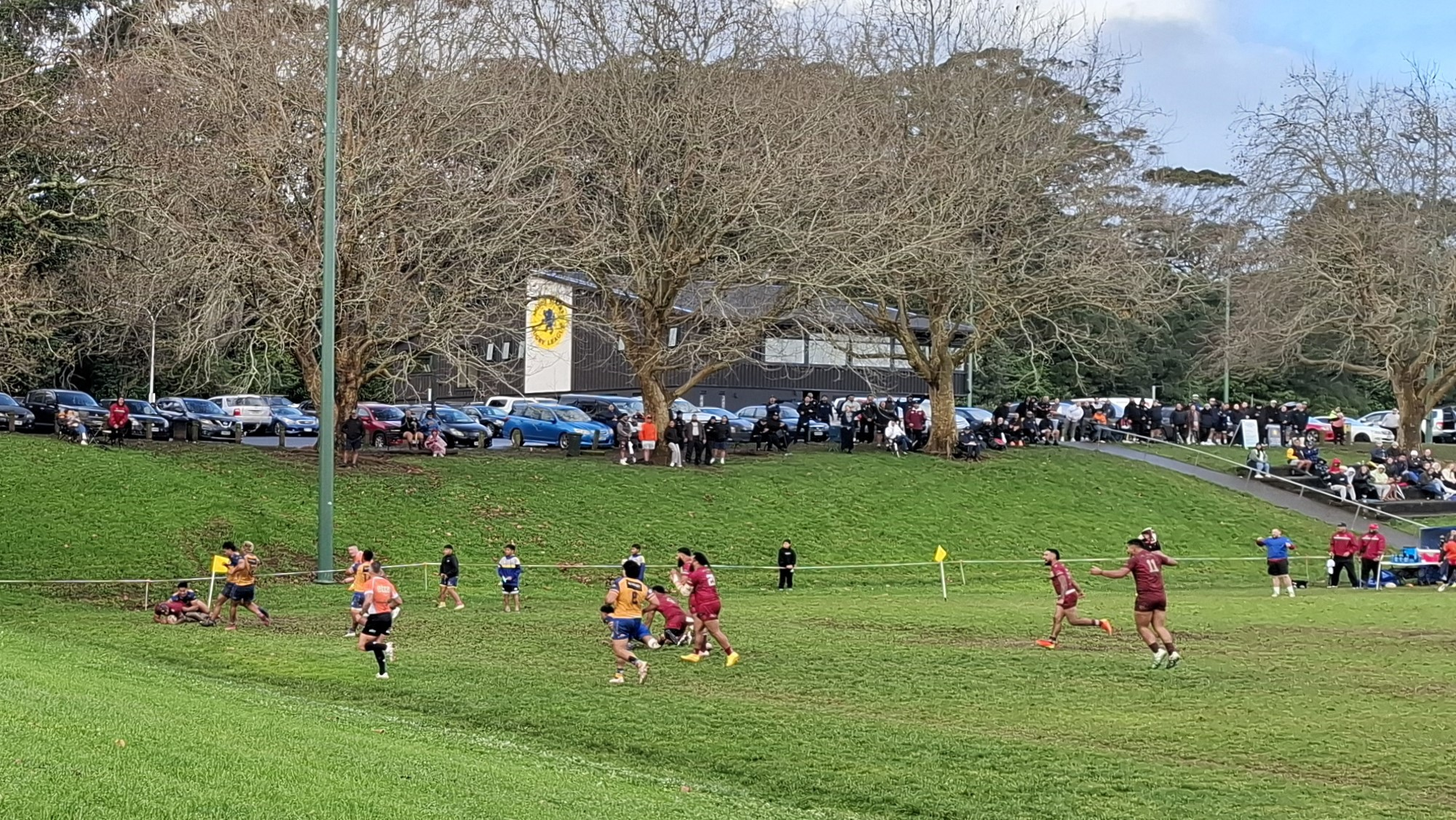
Henry scoring a try for Papakura Sea Eagles against Mount Albert Lions on June 28, 2025 in the Auckland Rugby League senior competition.

On June 28, 2025 Henry debuted for Papakura Sea Eagles rugby league side in Auckland in a game against Mt Albert. He was playing outside Viliami Lolohea who had also played rugby union in Japan.
