= Chantel Malone =

British Virgin Islands athletics competitor

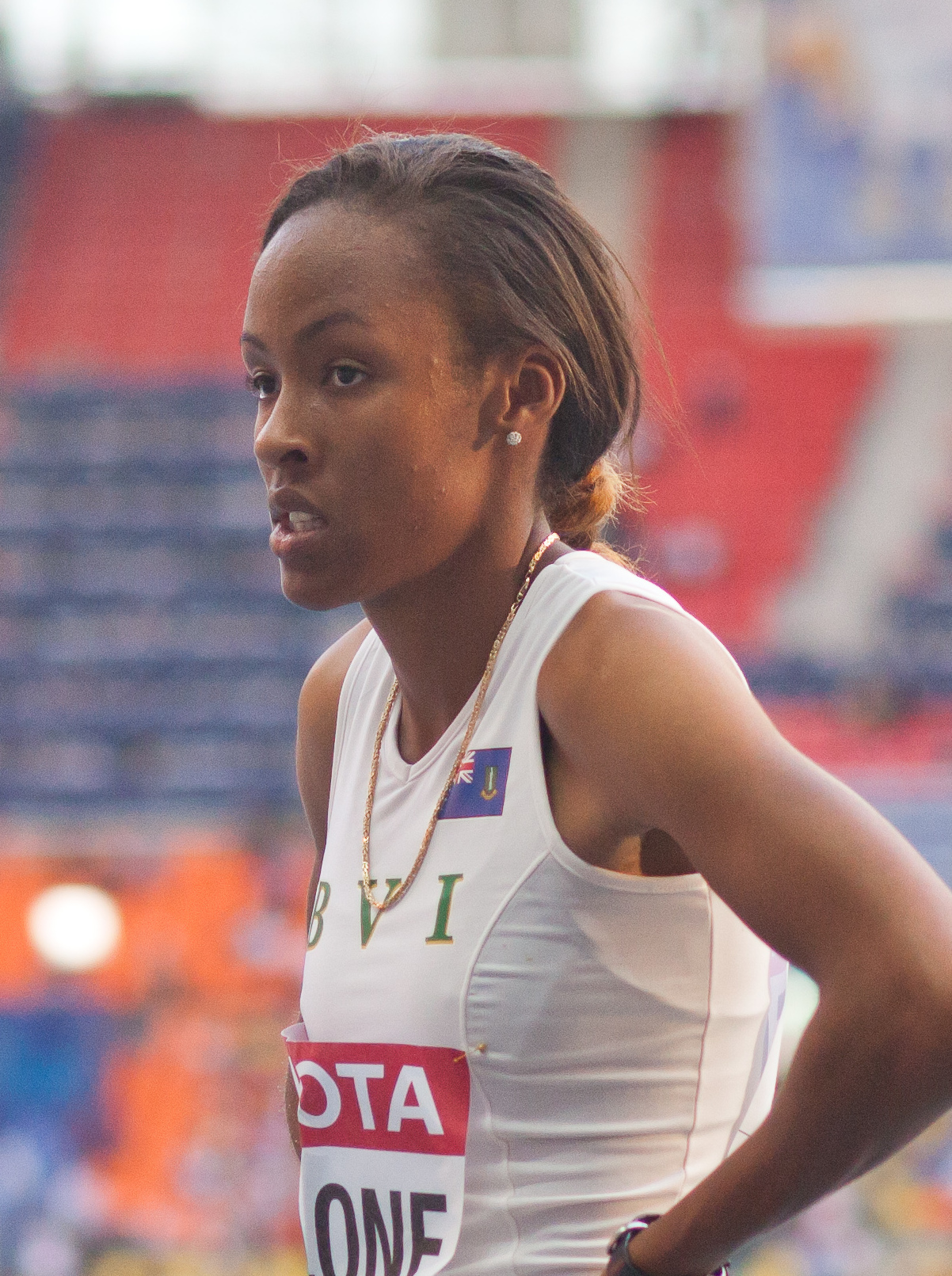
- Malone in 2013

Personal information
- Full name: Chantel Ellen Malone
- Born: 2 December 1991 (age 34) Puerto Rico
- Height: 1.80 m (5 ft 11 in)
- Weight: 82 kg (181 lb)

Sport
- Country: British Virgin Islands
- Sport: Athletics
- University team: Texas Longhorns
Medal record
Women's athletics
Representing British Virgin Islands
Pan American Games
Gold medal – first place	2019 Lima	Long jump
- Updated on 17 August 2019

Chantel Ellen Malone (born 2 December 1991 in Puerto Rico) is an athlete representing the British Virgin Islands who competes in the long jump and sprinting events.

Malone attended Althea Scatiffe Primary School before attending BVI High School, which Is now known as Elmore Stoutt High School.

In college, she was the Conference Champion for both indoor and outdoor track and field events, named All-American at the NCAA Division 1 Championship, and was a finalist at the World Junior Championships in two events, the long jump and the 400. She placed fourth at the Commonwealth Games, won gold at the CAC Championships, and most recently won a silver medal at the NACAC Championships.

In August 2015, Malone joined with Digicel as a brand ambassador. She will act as a spokesperson for the brand with a special focus on youth and sports throughout the British Virgin Islands and be featured in Digicel's advertising campaign, highlighting the territory's most reliable 4G network.

At the 2019 Pan American Games, Malone became the first athlete to win a medal for the British Virgin Islands in the history of the Pan American Games, winning the gold medal at the long jump event.

She represented the British Virgin Islands at the 2020 Summer Olympics.

== Competition record ==
Year	Competition	Venue	Position	Event	Notes
Representing British Virgin Islands
2005	CARIFTA Games (U17)	Bacolet, Trinidad and Tobago	10th (h)	400 m	58.67 s
2005	CARIFTA Games (U17)	Bacolet, Trinidad and Tobago	4th	High jump	1.60 m
2005	CARIFTA Games (U17)	Bacolet, Trinidad and Tobago	3rd	Long jump	5.25 m
2005	CARIFTA Games (U17)	Bacolet, Trinidad and Tobago	3rd	Triple jump	11.09 m
2005	Leeward Islands Junior; Championships (U17)	St. John's, Antigua and Barbuda	2nd	400m	59.64
2005	Leeward Islands Junior; Championships (U17)	St. John's, Antigua and Barbuda	1st	High jump	1.58 m
2005	Leeward Islands Junior; Championships (U17)	St. John's, Antigua and Barbuda	1st	Long jump	5.30 m
2005	Leeward Islands Junior; Championships (U17)	St. John's, Antigua and Barbuda	1st	Triple jump (U20)	11.23 m
2006	CARIFTA Games (U17)	Les Abymes, Guadeloupe	3rd	400 m	55.70 s
2006	CARIFTA Games (U17)	Les Abymes, Guadeloupe	4th	4x400 m	3:51.71
2006	CARIFTA Games (U17)	Les Abymes, Guadeloupe	2nd	Long jump	5.62 m
2006	CARIFTA Games (U17)	Les Abymes, Guadeloupe	2nd	Triple jump	11.58 m
2006	Leeward Islands Junior; Championships (U17)	St. John's, Antigua and Barbuda	1st	400m	57.90
2006	Leeward Islands Junior; Championships (U17)	St. John's, Antigua and Barbuda	1st	Long jump	5.46 m
2006	Central American and Caribbean; Junior Championships (U17)	Port of Spain, Trinidad and Tobago	5th	400 m	56.74 s
2006	Central American and Caribbean; Junior Championships (U17)	Port of Spain, Trinidad and Tobago	4th	4x100 m	47.28 s
2006	Central American and Caribbean; Junior Championships (U17)	Port of Spain, Trinidad and Tobago	4th	4x400 m	3:49.68
2006	Central American and Caribbean; Junior Championships (U17)	Port of Spain, Trinidad and Tobago	2nd	Long jump	5.34 m
2006	Central American and Caribbean; Junior Championships (U17)	Port of Spain, Trinidad and Tobago	4th	Triple jump	11.19 m
2007	CARIFTA Games (U17)	Providenciales, Turks and Caicos	4th	4x100 m	46.69 s
2007	CARIFTA Games (U17)	Providenciales, Turks and Caicos	2nd	Long jump	5.54 m
2007	CARIFTA Games (U17)	Providenciales, Turks and Caicos	1st	Triple jump	12.29 m
2007	World Youth Championships	Ostrava, Czech Republic	15th (h)	4x400 m	2:14.88
2007	World Youth Championships	Ostrava, Czech Republic	17th (q)	Triple jump	12.02 m
2008	Leeward Islands Junior; Championships (U20)	Road Town, British Virgin Islands	1st	400m	54.58
2008	Leeward Islands Junior; Championships (U20)	Road Town, British Virgin Islands	1st	High jump	1.65 m
2008	Leeward Islands Junior; Championships (U20)	Road Town, British Virgin Islands	1st	Long jump	6.09m (+1.8 m/s)
2008	Leeward Islands Junior; Championships (U20)	Road Town, British Virgin Islands	1st	Triple jump	12.45 m
2008	World Junior Championships	Bydgoszcz, Poland	19th (sf)	400 m	54.98 s
2009	Central American and Caribbean Championships	Havana, Cuba	5th	4x400 m	3:37.62
2009	Central American and Caribbean Championships	Havana, Cuba	10th	Long jump	5.85 m
2010	Central American and Caribbean; Junior Championships (U20)	Santo Domingo, Dom. Rep.	1st	400 m	53.10 s
2010	Central American and Caribbean; Junior Championships (U20)	Santo Domingo, Dom. Rep.	–	4x100 m	DNF
2010	Central American and Caribbean; Junior Championships (U20)	Santo Domingo, Dom. Rep.	2nd	Long jump	6.10 m
2010	World Junior Championships	Moncton, New Brunswick, Canada	8th	400m	53.91
2010	World Junior Championships	Moncton, New Brunswick, Canada	4th	Long jump	6.17 m (+0.1 m/s)
2011	Central American and Caribbean Championships	Mayagüez, Puerto Rico	4th	Long jump	6.23 m
2011	World Championships	Daegu, South Korea	30th (q)	Long jump	6.12 m
2013	Central American and Caribbean Championships	Morelia, Mexico	–	4x100 m	DNF
2013	Central American and Caribbean Championships	Morelia, Mexico	4th	Long jump	6.35 m
2013	World Championships	Moscow, Russia	21st (q)	Long jump	6.40 m
2014	IAAF World Relays	Nassau, Bahamas	15th	4x100 m	45.06 s
2014	Commonwealth Games	Glasgow, United Kingdom	4th	Long jump	6.41 m
2014	Central American and Caribbean Games	Veracruz, Mexico	1st	Long jump	6.46 m
2015	Pan American Games	Toronto, Canada	5th	Long jump	6.62 m
2015	NACAC Championships	San José, Costa Rica	2nd	Long jump	6.69 m
2015	World Championships	Beijing, China	21st (q)	Long jump	6.46 m
2017	World Championships	London, United Kingdom	7th	Long jump	6.57 m
2018	Commonwealth Games	Gold Coast, Australia	5th	Long jump	6.48 m
2018	Central American and Caribbean Games	Barranquilla, Colombia	2nd	Long jump	6.52 m
2018	NACAC Championships	Toronto, Canada	5th	Long jump	6.19 m
2019	Pan American Games	Lima, Peru	1st	Long jump	6.68 m
2019	World Championships	Doha, Qatar	22nd (q)	Long jump	6.45 m
2021	Olympic Games	Tokyo, Japan	12th	Long jump	6.50 m
2025	NACAC Championships	Freeport, Bahamas	4th	Long jump	6.60 m
2025	World Championships	Tokyo, Japan	12th	Long jump	6.33 m
2026	Commonwealth Games	Glasgow, United Kingdom	–	Long jump	NM

== Personal bests ==
Outdoor

- 200 metres – 23.37 (+0.1 m/s) (Houston 2011)
- 400 metres – 52.35 (Austin 2010) NR
- High jump – 1.65 (Tortola 2008)
- Long jump – 7.08 (+1.4) (Miramar 2021) NR
- Triple jump – 13.27 (+1.6 (Des Moines 2011) NR

Indoor

- 400 metres – 53.23 (Albuquerque 2011) NR
- Long jump – 6.67 (Berlin 2017) NR
- Triple jump – 13.45 (College Station 2011) NR
