= Nevis Amateur Athletic Association =

- Sport: Athletics
- Jurisdiction: Association
- Abbreviation: NAAA
- President: Lester Blackett

Official website
- sites.google.com/site/nevisaaa
- (Nevis)

The Nevis Amateur Athletic Association (NAAA) is the governing body for the sport of athletics in Nevis. The current president is Lester Blackett.

== Affiliations ==
- Saint Kitts & Nevis Amateur Athletic Association (SKNAAA)
- Leeward Islands Athletics Association (LIAA)
