= Elections in the British Virgin Islands =

Elections in the British Virgin Islands are conducted to elect members to the House of Assembly (formerly named the Legislative Council). In the British Virgin Islands elections are not conducted in relation to appointments to either the Executive or Judicial branches of Government, and there are no other publicly elected posts in the British Virgin Islands. Most elections are conducted as general elections, which under the Constitution are required to be held every four years, or as by-elections when a member of the House of Assembly dies or steps down. Since the re-introduction of democracy into the British Virgin Islands in 1950 there have been fifteen general elections, and three recorded by-elections. The last election was held on 25 February 2019.

The British Virgin Islands elects on territorial level to a unicameral legislature. The House of Assembly has a total of 15 members, 13 of whom are members elected by the public to serve a four-year term, plus two ex-officio non-voting members: the Attorney General and the Speaker of the House. Of the 13 elected members, nine are elected to represent Territorial district seats, and four are elected on a Territory-wide "at-large" basis.

Since 1999 the British Virgin Islands effectively has had a two-party system, which means that there are two dominant political parties. Prior to 1999 the political arena has been much more varied, with sometimes three or even four political parties seriously contesting elections. In the period 1990 to 1995 there was really no other serious political parties providing an alternative to the Virgin Islands Party in the Territory. Historically independent candidates have fared well in British Virgin Islands; in the 1979 general election independent candidates won a greater share of the vote (38.0%) than any political party, and won 4 out of the 9 available seats. However, 1999 general election marked the first time that no independent candidate was elected, and since that date only one person standing as an independent candidate has been elected (Alvin Christopher in 2003 general election).

Elections are held at least every four years. The system of elections is Westminster-style. The parties nominate candidates on a nomination day, then the election is held several weeks later. Government is formed by the leader best able to command a majority in the House.

== Qualifications ==
=== Qualifications for standing for election ===
Qualifications to be elected as a member of the House of Assembly are now regulated by article 65 of the Constitution. Broadly speaking this requires that the candidate must be a second generation Belonger, and must either be domiciled in the British Virgin Islands or have completed a period of residence.

In order to be elected as a member of the House, a person must either be a Virgin Islander (as defined) over the age of 21, and otherwise qualified to vote in the Territory. For these purposes a "Virgin Islander" means a Belonger who is either:

1. a person who was born in the British Virgin Islands to a mother or father who was a British Overseas Territories Citizen (by birth or descent);
2. a person who was born in the British Virgin Islands to a mother or father who was also a Belonger (by birth or descent); or
3. a person who was born outside of the British Virgin Islands to a mother or father who was also a Belonger (by birth or descent) provided that one of his or grandparents also belonged to the British Virgin Islands by birth.

A person may also be qualified to stand for election if they were qualified to stand in the 2007 general election under the previous Constitution, regardless of whether or not they have previously stood for election.

However, a person is disqualified from being elected (regardless of where they are born) if they are not domiciled in the British Virgin Islands unless:

1. in the case of a person who has never been domiciled in the British Virgin Islands, they have resided in the Territory for at least 5 years immediately before the date of their nomination for election; or
2. in the case of a person who was formerly domiciled in the British Virgin Islands, but have lived outside of the Territory for at least 10 years, they have resided in the Territory for at least 3 years immediately before the date of their nomination for election.

=== Disqualifications from standing for election ===
A person is disqualified from being elected as a member of the House if:

1. they hold any public office;
2. they are declared bankrupt in any country;
3. they are adjudged to be of unsound mind in any country;
4. a sentence of death has been imposed upon them, or if they have served a term of imprisonment of at least 12 months within the previous five years;
5. they are disqualified or suspended under the laws of the British Virgin Islands relating to elections offences; or
6. they are a party to, or a partner in a firm, or director or manager of company, with any contract with the Government for a public service (unless they have published a notice in the Gazette or other British Virgin Islands newspaper disclosing the nature of the contract and their interest).

=== Qualifications for voting ===
Qualifications to be registered as a voter in the British Virgin Islands are now regulated by article 68 of the Constitution. A person is qualified to vote if they are a Belonger aged 18 or older, and are either resident in the British Virgin Islands or are domiciled in the British Virgin Islands and resident in the United States Virgin Islands.

However a person is disqualified from voting if:

1. they are adjudged to be of unsound mind under British Virgin Islands law;
2. a sentence of death has been imposed upon them, or if they are serving a term of imprisonment of at least 12 months; or
3. they are disqualified or suspended under the laws of the British Virgin Islands relating to elections offences.

== Political parties ==
Political parties in the British Virgin Islands are not generally formed on an ideological basis, and do not normally affiliate themselves with a political school of thought. Political parties do not identify themselves are being on the political right or the political left. Similarly parties do not normally identify themselves with mainstream political movement such as green politics. Although there are no religious parties in the British Virgin Islands, all parties typically identify themselves with Christianity. Most parties campaign on a concepts with close affinity to nationalism, and core competency in relation to administration of Government. Because of the high numbers of economic migrants in the British Virgin Islands, much political campaigning has a xenophobic tinge to it, and often focuses on political patronage for BVIslanders.

Politicians often develop great loyalty from members of their constituencies. Possibly linked to the lack of party ideology, politicians often "cross the floor" to another political party without any discernible effect on their popularity, and a number of leading political figures in the Territory have done this multiple times.

=== Active parties ===
There are presently three active political parties in the British Virgin Islands as of April 2022:

1. The present ruling party is the Virgin Islands Party, led by Premier Andrew Fahie.
2. The present main opposition party National Democratic Party (led by Marlon A Penn).
3. The newly formed People's Empowerment Party (which has never held power), led by Alvin Christopher.

=== Defunct parties ===
There are a number of former political parties in the British Virgin Islands, but only four have ever succeeded in having a candidate elected to the legislature:

1. The United Party (originally called the BVI United Party), which won general election victories in 1967, 1975 and 1983. Defunct since approximately 2005 by-election.
2. VI Democratic Party, which won the 1971 general election (together with Willard Wheatley (Ind)). Contested each general election from 1967 to 1979 except for 1975. Defunct since 1979.
3. People's Own Party. Only contested the 1967 general election, winning one seat (Isaac Fonseca) in a seven-seat legislature. Defunct since at least 1971.
4. Independent People's Movement. Put forward two candidates in the 1990 general election; one was elected (Omar Hodge). No other electoral appearances. Defunct shortly after formation.

== Electoral issues ==
Elections in the British Virgin Islands are rarely conducted on an ideological basis, or even in relation to specific local political issues. Instead, voters are generally asked to choose between two primary parties (and a host of independent candidates) and vote on the basis of a combination of:

1. party loyalty
2. competence to govern
3. political patronage

Most election campaigns are usually conducted on the basis of each candidate who is affiliated with a party pointing to their own successes in government, and criticising the performance of the other party. Each party will typically try to present itself as the party who fights for the "common man", and accuse the other party of financial mismanagement or corruption, as well as alleging that they only act in the best interests of limited pool of well connected wealthy persons. Independent candidates will typically argue that neither party is competent or trustworthy, and that unaffiliated politicians should be elected.

British Virgin Islands politics have become highly polarised since the mid-1990s. Since the 1999 general election, no party won consecutive terms in office until the NDP secured victory in the 2015 general election. Prior to the 1990s independent candidates were a common feature of legislatures in the British Virgin Islands, but more recently politics have become party dominated, and independent candidates and candidates for minority parties are rarely successful.

== Latest elections ==
Party	District			At-large			Total seats	+/–
Party	Votes	%	Seats	Votes	%	Seats	Total seats	+/–
Virgin Islands Party	3,632	39.60	5	11,576	31.90	1	6	–2
Progressive Virgin Islands Movement	1,439	15.69	1	12,405	34.18	2	3	+2
National Democratic Party	2,668	29.09	2	9,464	26.08	1	3	0
Progressives United	459	5.00	1				1	0
Independents	973	10.61	0	2,844	7.84	0	0	0
Speaker and Attorney General							2	0
Total	9,171	100.00	9	36,289	100.00	4	15	0
Valid votes	9,171	98.88		36,289	97.81			
Invalid/blank votes	104	1.12		811	2.19			
Total votes	9,275	100.00		37,100	100.00			
Registered voters/turnout	16,130	57.50						
Source: Government of the British Virgin Islands, BVI Platinum

== Past elections ==
=== General elections 1950 - 1963 ===
Prior to 1967 elections were held on a non-party basis. Relatively few records survive in relation to these early elections, and it is possible that they were conducted by straw poll or show of hands rather than by ballot.

In 1950 four legislators were elected to the Legislative Council on a Territory-wide basis. The inaugural legislative council included four elected members: Isaac Glanville Fonseca, Howard R. Penn MBE, Carlton L.E. deCastro and John Charles Brudenell-Bruce MBE.

In 1953 the number of legislators was increased to six, and elections were conducted on the basis of territorial constituencies (with Road Town electing two legislators).

British Virgin Islands general elections (1950 to 1963)
Year	Candidates elected	Constituency
1950	Isaac G. Fonseca	At-large
1950	Howard R. Penn	At-large
1950	Carlton L.E. deCastro	At-large
1950	John Charles Brudenell-Bruce	At-large
1954	Wilfred W. Smith	1st District
1954	Howard R. Penn	2nd District
1954	Isaac G. Fonseca	2nd District
1954	Edwin H. Leonard*	3rd District
1954	Leslie Franklyn Malone	4th District
1954	Theodolph Faulkner	5th District
1957	H. Lavity Stoutt	1st District
1957	Howard R. Penn	2nd District
1957	Isaac G. Fonseca	2nd District
1957	Ivan Dawson	3rd District
1957	Leslie F. Malone	4th District
1957	Waldo E. O'Neal	5th District
1960	H. Lavity Stoutt	1st District
1960	Howard R. Penn	2nd District
1960	Isaac G. Fonseca	2nd District
1960	Ivan Dawson	3rd District
1960	Leslie F. Malone	4th District
1960	Theodolph H. Faulkner	5th District
1963	H. Lavity Stoutt	1st District
1963	Isaac G. Fonseca	2nd District
1963	Arnando Scatliffe	2nd District
1963	Ivan Dawson	3rd District
1963	Terrance B. Lettsome	4th District
1963	Q. William Osborne	5th District
* Term was completed John Charles Brudenell-Bruce (1955-1957)

=== General elections 1967 to date ===
In 1967 Ministerial government was introduced into the British Virgin Islands, and candidates organised themselves into political parties. The results of the party contested general elections were as follows:

British Virgin Islands general elections (1967 to date)
Year	Party	Seats Won		Total	Chief Minister / Premier	Winning Party
Year	Party	District	At-large*	Total	Chief Minister / Premier	Winning Party
1967	BVI United Party	4	N/A	4	H. Lavity Stoutt	BVI United Party
1967	VI Democratic Party	2	N/A	2	H. Lavity Stoutt	BVI United Party
1967	People's Own Party	1	N/A	1	H. Lavity Stoutt	BVI United Party
1967	Total seats:	7	0	7	H. Lavity Stoutt	BVI United Party
1971	VI Democratic Party	3	N/A	3	Willard Wheatley	VI Democratic Party; Coalition
1971	Virgin Islands Party	2	N/A	2	Willard Wheatley	VI Democratic Party; Coalition
1971	BVI United Party	1	N/A	1	Willard Wheatley	VI Democratic Party; Coalition
1971	Independents	1	N/A	1	Willard Wheatley	VI Democratic Party; Coalition
1971	Total seats:	7	0	7	Willard Wheatley	VI Democratic Party; Coalition
1975	Virgin Islands Party	3	N/A	3	Willard Wheatley (2nd time)	BVI United Party; Coalition (2nd Term)
1975	BVI United Party	2	N/A	2	Willard Wheatley (2nd time)	BVI United Party; Coalition (2nd Term)
1975	Virgin Islands Progressive Party	0	N/A	0	Willard Wheatley (2nd time)	BVI United Party; Coalition (2nd Term)
1975	Independents	1	N/A	1	Willard Wheatley (2nd time)	BVI United Party; Coalition (2nd Term)
1975	Undeclared (Oliver Cills in District 3)†	1	N/A	1	Willard Wheatley (2nd time)	BVI United Party; Coalition (2nd Term)
1975	Total seats:	7	0	7	Willard Wheatley (2nd time)	BVI United Party; Coalition (2nd Term)
1979	Virgin Islands Party	4	N/A	4	H. Lavity Stoutt (2nd time)	Virgin Islands Party
1979	BVI United Party	0	N/A	0	H. Lavity Stoutt (2nd time)	Virgin Islands Party
1979	VI Democratic Party	0	N/A	0	H. Lavity Stoutt (2nd time)	Virgin Islands Party
1979	Virgin Islands National Movement	0	N/A	0	H. Lavity Stoutt (2nd time)	Virgin Islands Party
1979	Independents	3	N/A	3	H. Lavity Stoutt (2nd time)	Virgin Islands Party
1979	Undeclared (Oliver Cills in District 3; Willard Wheatley in District 8)†	2	N/A	2	H. Lavity Stoutt (2nd time)	Virgin Islands Party
1979	Total seats:	9	0	9	H. Lavity Stoutt (2nd time)	Virgin Islands Party
1983	BVI United Party	4	N/A	4	Cyril Romney	BVI United Party; Coalition (3rd Term)
1983	Virgin Islands Party	4	N/A	4	Cyril Romney	BVI United Party; Coalition (3rd Term)
1983	Independents	1	N/A	1	Cyril Romney	BVI United Party; Coalition (3rd Term)
1983	Total seats:	9	0	9	Cyril Romney	BVI United Party; Coalition (3rd Term)
1986	Virgin Islands Party	5	N/A	5	Lavity Stoutt (3rd time)	Virgin Islands Party (2nd Term)
1986	BVI United Party	2	N/A	2	Lavity Stoutt (3rd time)	Virgin Islands Party (2nd Term)
1986	People's Party	0	N/A	0	Lavity Stoutt (3rd time)	Virgin Islands Party (2nd Term)
1986	Independents	2	N/A	2	Lavity Stoutt (3rd time)	Virgin Islands Party (2nd Term)
1986	Total seats:	9	0	9	Lavity Stoutt (3rd time)	Virgin Islands Party (2nd Term)
1990	Virgin Islands Party	6	N/A	6	Lavity Stoutt (4th time)	Virgin Islands Party (3rd Term)
1990	Independent People's Movement	1	N/A	1	Lavity Stoutt (4th time)	Virgin Islands Party (3rd Term)
1990	BVI United Party	0	N/A	0	Lavity Stoutt (4th time)	Virgin Islands Party (3rd Term)
1990	Progressive People's Party	0	N/A	0	Lavity Stoutt (4th time)	Virgin Islands Party (3rd Term)
1990	Independents	2	N/A	2	Lavity Stoutt (4th time)	Virgin Islands Party (3rd Term)
1990	Total seats:	9	0	9	Lavity Stoutt (4th time)	Virgin Islands Party (3rd Term)
1995	Virgin Islands Party	4	2	6	Lavity Stoutt‡ (5th time); Ralph T. O'Neal	Virgin Islands Party (4th Term)
1995	BVI United Party	1	1	2	Lavity Stoutt‡ (5th time); Ralph T. O'Neal	Virgin Islands Party (4th Term)
1995	Concerned Citizen's Movement	2	0	2	Lavity Stoutt‡ (5th time); Ralph T. O'Neal	Virgin Islands Party (4th Term)
1995	Independents	2	1	3	Lavity Stoutt‡ (5th time); Ralph T. O'Neal	Virgin Islands Party (4th Term)
1995	Total seats:	9	4	13	Lavity Stoutt‡ (5th time); Ralph T. O'Neal	Virgin Islands Party (4th Term)
1999	Virgin Islands Party	5	2	7	Ralph T. O'Neal (2nd time)	Virgin Islands Party (5th Term)
1999	National Democratic Party	3	2	5	Ralph T. O'Neal (2nd time)	Virgin Islands Party (5th Term)
1999	Concerned Citizen's Movement	1	0	1	Ralph T. O'Neal (2nd time)	Virgin Islands Party (5th Term)
1999	BVI United Party	0	0	0	Ralph T. O'Neal (2nd time)	Virgin Islands Party (5th Term)
1999	Independents	0	0	0	Ralph T. O'Neal (2nd time)	Virgin Islands Party (5th Term)
1999	Total seats:	9	4	13	Ralph T. O'Neal (2nd time)	Virgin Islands Party (5th Term)
2003	National Democratic Party	4	4	8	D. Orlando Smith	National Democratic Party
2003	Virgin Islands Party	5	0	5	D. Orlando Smith	National Democratic Party
2003	Independents	0	0	0	D. Orlando Smith	National Democratic Party
2003	Total seats:	9	4	13	D. Orlando Smith	National Democratic Party
2007	Virgin Islands Party	7	3	10	Ralph T. O'Neal (3rd time)	Virgin Islands Party (6th Term)
2007	National Democratic Party	1	1	2	Ralph T. O'Neal (3rd time)	Virgin Islands Party (6th Term)
2007	Independents	1	0	1	Ralph T. O'Neal (3rd time)	Virgin Islands Party (6th Term)
2007	Total seats:	9	4	13	Ralph T. O'Neal (3rd time)	Virgin Islands Party (6th Term)
2011	National Democratic Party	5	4	9	D. Orlando Smith (2nd time)	National Democratic Party (2nd Term)
2011	Virgin Islands Party	4	0	4	D. Orlando Smith (2nd time)	National Democratic Party (2nd Term)
2011	People's Patriotic Alliance	0	0	0	D. Orlando Smith (2nd time)	National Democratic Party (2nd Term)
2011	Independents	0	0	0	D. Orlando Smith (2nd time)	National Democratic Party (2nd Term)
2011	Total seats:	9	4	13	D. Orlando Smith (2nd time)	National Democratic Party (2nd Term)
2015	National Democratic Party	7	4	11	D. Orlando Smith (3rd time)	National Democratic Party (3rd Term)
2015	Virgin Islands Party	2	0	2	D. Orlando Smith (3rd time)	National Democratic Party (3rd Term)
2015	People's Empowerment Party	0	0	0	D. Orlando Smith (3rd time)	National Democratic Party (3rd Term)
2015	People's Coalition Movement	0	0	0	D. Orlando Smith (3rd time)	National Democratic Party (3rd Term)
2015	Independents	0	0	0	D. Orlando Smith (3rd time)	National Democratic Party (3rd Term)
2015	Total seats:	9	4	13	D. Orlando Smith (3rd time)	National Democratic Party (3rd Term)
2019	Virgin Islands Party	4	4	8	Andrew Fahie	Virgin Islands Party (7th Term)
2019	National Democratic Party	3	0	3	Andrew Fahie	Virgin Islands Party (7th Term)
2019	Progressive Virgin Islands Movement	1	0	1	Andrew Fahie	Virgin Islands Party (7th Term)
2019	Progressives United	1	0	1	Andrew Fahie	Virgin Islands Party (7th Term)
2019	Independents	0	0	0	Andrew Fahie	Virgin Islands Party (7th Term)
2019	Total seats:	9	4	13	Andrew Fahie	Virgin Islands Party (7th Term)
2023	Virgin Islands Party	5	1	7	Natalio D. Wheatley	Virgin Islands Party (8th Term)
2023	National Democratic Party	2	1	3	Natalio D. Wheatley	Virgin Islands Party (8th Term)
2023	Progressive Virgin Islands Movement	1	2	3	Natalio D. Wheatley	Virgin Islands Party (8th Term)
2023	Progressives United	1	0	1	Natalio D. Wheatley	Virgin Islands Party (8th Term)
2023	Independents	0	0	0	Natalio D. Wheatley	Virgin Islands Party (8th Term)
2023	Total seats:	9	4	13	Natalio D. Wheatley	Virgin Islands Party (8th Term)
* Territorial at-large seats were introduced in 1995. † Unopposed candidates did not have to declare party affiliations. Oliver Cills is recorded as a member of the VI Democratic Party from 1971-1979, but the VI Democratic Party did not contest the 1975 election. ‡ Died in office.

=== By-elections ===
There have been three recorded by-elections in the British Virgin Islands to date: the first in 1977 following the death of Austin Henley (VIDP - 2nd District), the second in 1995 following the death of Lavity Stoutt (VIP - 1st District), and the third in 2005 following the death of Paul Wattley (NDP - At-large). In each case except the first the party which had won the seat originally held the seat at the by-election.

Two further by-election were expected but not held. One following the death of the Delores Christopher, but because of the proximity to the 2019 general election it was decided to bring forward the date of the general election instead, and not hold a separate by-election. The second was when Andrew Fahie resigned his seat, and again it was decided not to hold a separate by-election because of the upcoming 2023 general election.

British Virgin Islands by-elections
Year	Reason	Results			Constituency
Year	Reason	Candidate	Party	Votes	Constituency
1977	Death of A. Austin Henley (VIDP)	Prince McDonald Stoutt	Virgin Islands Party	Unknown	2nd District
1995	Death of Lavity Stoutt (VIP)	Angel Smith	Virgin Islands Party	415	1st District
1995	Death of Lavity Stoutt (VIP)	Irene Penn-O'Neal	Independent	128	1st District
1995	Death of Lavity Stoutt (VIP)	Monroe M. Penn	Independent	4	1st District
2005	Death of Paul Wattley (NDP)	Elmore Stoutt	National Democratic Party	2,570	At-large
2005	Death of Paul Wattley (NDP)	Vernon Elroy Malone	Virgin Islands Party	2,167	At-large
2005	Death of Paul Wattley (NDP)	Conrad Maduro	BVI United Party	144	At-large
2005	Death of Paul Wattley (NDP)	Richard Courtney deCastro	Independent	19	At-large

== Electoral milestones and feats ==
Electoral social milestones
Milestone	Particulars	Date
First female candidate	Millicent Mercer	1971
First female legislator	Ethlyn Smith*	1995
First female legislator	Eileene Parsons	1995
First female Premier	None.	
First racial minority candidate	John Charles Brudenell-Bruce (white)	1950
First racial minority legislator	John Charles Brudenell-Bruce (white)	1950
First racial minority Chief Minister	Cyril Romney (mixed race)	1983
First openly gay candidate	None.	
First openly gay legislator	None.	
First openly gay Premier	None.	
* Also first female Minister of Government.

Party electoral feats
Milestone	Party	Result	Particulars
Most general elections contested	Virgin Islands Party	14	1971 - 2023
Most general elections won	Virgin Islands Party	8	1979, 1986, 1990, 1995, 1999, 2007, 2019, 2023
Most consecutive general elections won	Virgin Islands Party	4	1986, 1990, 1995, 1999
Highest percentage of the vote (election won)	National Democratic Party	60.2%	2015
Highest number of votes (election won)	National Democratic Party	27,070 votes	2015
Lowest percentage of the vote (election won)	Virgin Islands Party	27.8%	1979
Lowest number of the votes (election won)	Virgin Islands Party	733 votes	1979
Largest majority	National Democratic Party	+9	2015

Individual electoral feats
Milestone	Politician (District)	Result	Particulars
Most general elections contested	H. Lavity Stoutt (1st)	11*	1957 - 1995
Most general elections contested	Ralph T. O'Neal (7th / 9th)	11*	1975 - 2011
Most general elections won	H. Lavity Stoutt (1st)	11	1957 - 1995
Most consecutive general elections won	H. Lavity Stoutt (1st)	11	1957 - 1995
Length of time in Legislature	Ralph T. O'Neal (7th / 9th)	39 years, 280 days	1975 – 2015
Highest percentage of the vote (district seat)	H. Lavity Stoutt (1st)	85.8%	1990
Highest total votes (district seat)	Marlon Penn (8th)	943 votes	2015
Highest percentage of the vote (At-large seat)	Myron Walwyn	16.0%	2015
Highest total votes (At-large seat)	Myron Walwyn	5,777 votes	2015
Lowest total votes (district seat) - winner	Conrad Maduro (2nd)	92 votes	1986
Lowest total votes (district seat) - loser	Rueben Wheatley (7th)	2 votes	1975
Smallest margin of victory	Austin Henley (2nd)	1 vote	1975
Smallest margin of victory	Conrad Maduro (2nd)	1 vote	1986
* Conrad Maduro has contested 10 general elections, plus one by-election (2005).

== See also ==
- Electoral calendar
- Electoral system
