= 2015 British Virgin Islands general election =

- 8 June 2015

13 of the 15 seats in the House of Assembly 7 seats needed for a majority
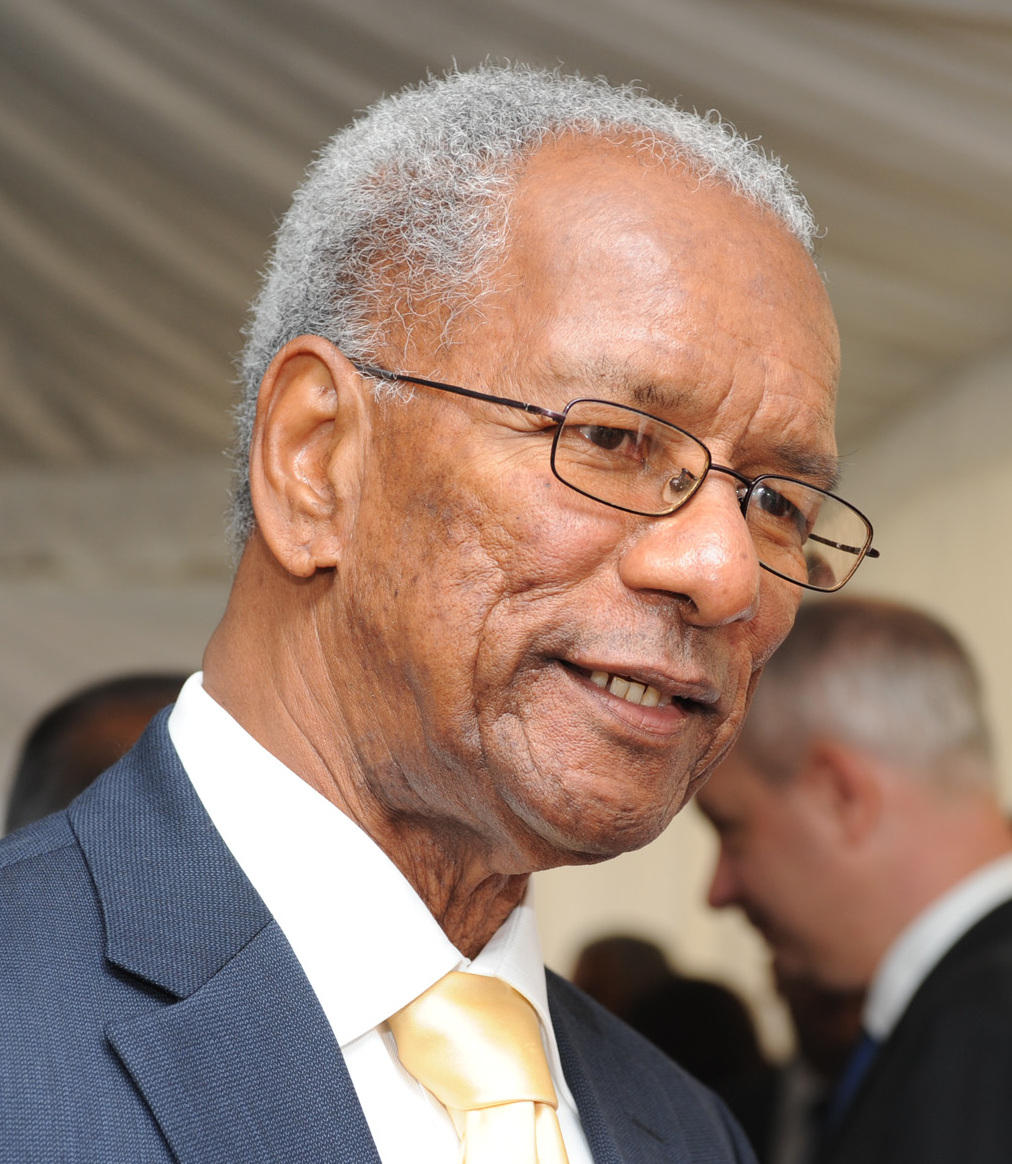

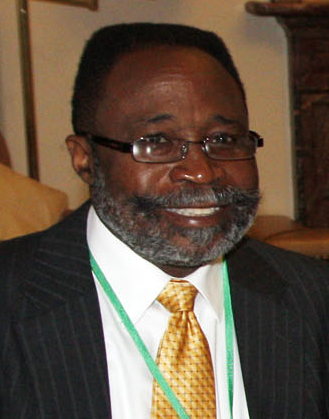
	First party	Second party
Leader	Orlando Smith	Julian Fraser
Party	NDP	VIP
Last election	52.91%, 9 seats	38.34%, 4 seats
Seats won	11	2
Seat change	▲2	▼2
Popular vote	21,523	10,771
Percentage	59.66%	28.25%
Premier before election
Orlando Smith
NDP
Premier after election
Orlando Smith
NDP

General elections were held in the British Virgin Islands on 8 June 2015 to elect members to the House of Assembly. The result was a landslide victory for the incumbent National Democratic Party (NDP) over the opposition Virgin Islands Party (VIP). No minor parties or independent candidates won any seats. Unusually, every single incumbent candidate who stood in their original seat was victorious.

The supervisor of elections was Juliette Penn. Prior to polling day, the VIP had complained to Governor John Duncan of alleged irregularities relating to the conduct advance polling day. In a statement the supervisor of elections acknowledged irregularities, but indicated that they were of a minor and technical nature, and were swiftly rectified once noticed. The report of the international Election Observer Mission noted that the election "was peaceful and vibrant and saw high levels of public engagement."

== Background ==
The second sitting of the House of Assembly was dissolved for the election on 1 May 2015, but the election date was not announced until 6 May 2015.

Former premier, Ralph T. O'Neal, had warned of the possibility of the Government calling a snap election. President of the opposition Virgin Islands Party, Carvin Malone, had predicted an election on 6 or 13 July 2015. Although it became common parlance to refer to the election as a "snap" election in local media, it is not entirely clear that it was. The ruling party announced candidates for an "upcoming election" over a month prior to dissolution of the House, and all parties claimed that they had anticipated the announcement.

Former Premier Ralph O'Neal stepped down and did not contest the 2015 election, the first general election he has not contested since 1967. He was the longest serving politician in the Territory's history, and had held the seat for Virgin Gorda and Anegada (now the 9th district, originally the 7th district) continuously since 1975.

Although political dynasties have not been a large feature of British Virgin Islands politics, the 2015 election witnessed descendants of each of the first three chief ministers of the territory standing for office. Lavity Stoutt's son, Preston, ran in the first district as an independent candidate. Willard Wheatley's grandson, Natalio, ran at-large for the People's Empowerment Party, and Cyril Romney's daughter, JoAnne, ran in the fourth district for the Virgin Islands Party. However each of those candidates eventually lost their election bid by some distance.

The 2015 also saw the largest number of female candidates in the Territory's history. The NDP fielded three female candidates, the VIP fielded six, the PEP fielded one female candidate, and two of the declared independent candidates were female.

== Main parties ==
The ruling National Democratic Party (NDP), led by Premier Orlando Smith, sought to defend its majority in the House. They were opposed by the opposition Virgin Islands Party (VIP), led by former Minister Julian Fraser. The NDP and the VIP each fielded a full slate of 13 candidates. Two minority parties also contested the election: the People's Empowerment Party (PEP), led by sitting member of the House, Alvin Christopher, which fielded 5 candidates; and the Progressive Coalition Movement (PCM) which fielded 3 candidates in total.

In addition, a number of independent candidates have declared an intention to stand, including three in the 9th District. The most notable of these was former deputy premier, Dancia Penn. Only one candidate had been elected in the British Virgin Islands in the past 20 years running as an independent (Alvin Christopher).

== Campaign ==
The election was noted for its highly negative tenor. A post-election report released afterwards by the Election Observer Mission to the Virgin Islands stated that voters described the 2015 campaign as the most negative they had ever witnessed. The report noted: "This consisted of personal attacks and accusations, criticism and allegations of past performance of opponents and inflammatory and defamatory rhetoric, rather than a positive discussion of the major political issues. With a proliferation of partisan politics, these stakeholders noted a heightened divisiveness of the campaign, both for society at-large and within families."

Even before the election had actually been called there were complaints about the nature of party political media advertisements, and allegations of using smear tactics. There were allegations in the press of use of drones to follow candidates and film their movements, and political parties were accused of abusing powers of patronage and acting like "gangs".

On the day upon which the House of Assembly was dissolved for the election, the opposition Virgin Islands Party circulated documents which they claimed meant that the minister for education Myron Walwyn should have been stripped of his seat for failing to disclose his interest in companies which secured Government contracts.

Very little campaigning focused on specific issues or ideology, and most candidates campaigned on a mixture of core competency and criticising past performance of opponents. Numerous candidates indulged in vague and unsubstantiated allegations of corruption against rivals. Most election speeches promised further development projects, and addressing the increasing cost of living was also a common theme. The VIP suggested potentially addressing cost of living through introducing price controls. Campaigns also produced fairly routine promises of political patronage, and pandering to xenophobia. At the same time, at least one politician spoke of the need for nationality laws to be reformed so that children born in the Territory would be Virgin Islanders with full equality.

The Government was criticised for signing a number of no-bid petty contracts with various local businesses in the last few days before the voting, although such practices are relatively commonplace in the British Virgin Islands.

== Results ==
The ruling National Democratic Party won in convincing fashion, and had secured victory early in the night solely on the basis of the district seats (results for the at-large seats take longer to count and normally only come in the next day). In the event, the NDP won all four at-large seats as well to complete a landslide victory, becoming the first party to win back-to-back elections in the British Virgin Islands since the Virgin Islands Party achieved the feat in the 1999 general election. The NDP's margin of victory (9 seats) and share of the total votes cast (60.2%) were both records for an election.

The NDP held on to all four of the at-large positions, comfortably holding off the challenge from the VIP and independent candidate Dancia Penn. Myron Walwyn's 5,777 votes in the at-large seats set a record for the highest number of votes for an at-large candidate, as did his 16.0% of the votes cast.

Party	District			At-large			Total seats	+/–
Party	Votes	%	Seats	Votes	%	Seats	Total seats	+/–
National Democratic Party	5,725	62.63	7	21,523	59.66	4	11	+2
Virgin Islands Party	2,828	30.94	2	10,771	29.85	0	2	–2
People's Empowerment Party	317	3.47	0	1,521	4.22	0	0	New
People's Coalition Movement				308	0.85	0	0	New
Independents	271	2.96	0	1,956	5.42	0	0	0
Speaker and Attorney General							2	0
Total	9,141	100.00	9	36,079	100.00	4	15	0
Valid votes	9,141	98.93		9,170	98.71			
Invalid/blank votes	99	1.07		120	1.29			
Total votes	9,240	100.00		9,290	100.00			
Registered voters/turnout	13,585	68.02		13,585	68.38			
Source: Election Centre, Election Centre

=== District seats ===
1st District
Candidate	Party	Votes	%
Andrew Fahie	Virgin Islands Party	652	65.40
Shaina Mary Ann Smith	National Democratic Party	277	27.78
Preston P. H. Stoutt	Independent	68	6.82
Total		997	100.00
Valid votes		997	98.91
Invalid/blank votes		11	1.09
Total votes		1,008	100.00
Registered voters/turnout		1,479	68.15

Incumbent Andrew Fahie successfully defended his first district seat, his fifth successive general election victory. The first district seat has now been in VIP hands since the 1971 general election. Shania Smith and Preston Stoutt each lost their second consecutive attempt to be elected to the House of Assembly.

2nd District
Candidate	Party	Votes	%
Melvin M. Turnbull	National Democratic Party	600	65.57
Elford W. Parsons	People's Empowerment Party	290	31.69
Rajah Smith	Virgin Islands Party	25	2.73
Total		915	100.00
Valid votes		915	99.78
Invalid/blank votes		2	0.22
Total votes		917	100.00
Registered voters/turnout		1,387	66.11

Political newcomer Melvin "Mitch" Turnbull Jr. comfortably won the second district seat from a field that consisted of three candidates contesting their first election. Longtime second district representative, Alvin Christopher, elected to stand at-large.

3rd District
Candidate	Party	Votes	%
Julian Fraser	Virgin Islands Party	596	51.51
Kevin C. Smith	National Democratic Party	561	48.49
Total		1,157	100.00
Valid votes		1,157	98.05
Invalid/blank votes		23	1.95
Total votes		1,180	100.00
Registered voters/turnout		1,620	72.84

Incumbent and VIP party leader Julian Fraser successfully defended his seat with a narrow victory over Kevin "OJ" Smith for the second consecutive election, and for Fraser's fifth consecutive general election victory.

4th District
Candidate	Party	Votes	%
Mark H. Vanterpool	National Democratic Party	717	82.60
Joann Romney	Virgin Islands Party	151	17.40
Total		868	100.00
Valid votes		868	97.75
Invalid/blank votes		20	2.25
Total votes		888	100.00
Registered voters/turnout		1,358	65.39

Incumbent Mark Vanterpool successfully defended his seat, crushing political newcomer JoAnne "Roxie" Romney.

5th District
Candidate	Party	Votes	%
Delores Christopher	National Democratic Party	590	58.30
Zoe Walcott-McMillan	Virgin Islands Party	399	39.43
Shabazz Abdul	Independent	23	2.27
Total		1,012	100.00
Valid votes		1,012	99.51
Invalid/blank votes		5	0.49
Total votes		1,017	100.00
Registered voters/turnout		1,607	63.29

Incumbent Delores Christopher successfully defended her seat, comfortably defeating Zoe Walcott-McMillan (who lost her third consecutive election) and independent candidate Abdul Shabazz.

6th District
Candidate	Party	Votes	%
Alvera Maduro-Caines	National Democratic Party	765	73.21
Elvis J. Harrigan	Virgin Islands Party	237	22.68
Dion Jennings	Independent	43	4.11
Total		1,045	100.00
Valid votes		1,045	98.86
Invalid/blank votes		12	1.14
Total votes		1,057	100.00
Registered voters/turnout		1,641	64.41

Incumbent Alvera Maduro-Caines won the sixth district seat, easily defeating former legislator Elvis "Juggy" Harrigan (who lost his second consecutive election), and newcomer Dion Jennings.

7th District
Candidate	Party	Votes	%
Kedrick Pickering	National Democratic Party	607	75.31
Oleanvine Pickering-Maynard	Virgin Islands Party	199	24.69
Total		806	100.00
Valid votes		806	99.75
Invalid/blank votes		2	0.25
Total votes		808	100.00
Registered voters/turnout		1,272	63.52

Incumbent and Deputy Premier Kedrick Pickering easily defended his seat in the seventh district against newcomer Oleanvine Pickering-Maynard.

8th District
Candidate	Party	Votes	%
Marlon A. Penn	National Democratic Party	937	83.51
McLloyd Owen Walters	Virgin Islands Party	185	16.49
Total		1,122	100.00
Valid votes		1,122	98.94
Invalid/blank votes		12	1.06
Total votes		1,134	100.00
Registered voters/turnout		1,587	71.46

Incumbent Marlon Penn successfully defended his seat in the eight district, crushing newcomer McLloyd Walters. Penn's 943 votes were a record for a district seat in a British Virgin Islands election.

9th District
Candidate	Party	Votes	%
Hubert O'Neal	National Democratic Party	671	55.05
Elton Sprauve	Virgin Islands Party	384	31.50
Albert Wheatley	Independent	63	5.17
Stephanie Faulkner-Williams	Independent	37	3.04
Vernon Vanterpool	Independent	37	3.04
Faye Reese	People's Empowerment Party	27	2.21
Total		1,219	100.00
Valid votes		1,219	99.03
Invalid/blank votes		12	0.97
Total votes		1,231	100.00
Registered voters/turnout		1,634	75.34

Contesting his sixth general election (and fifth in the same district), Hubert O'Neal overcame a crowded field, and finally for the first time won the ninth district seat formerly occupied by the now-retired Ralph O'Neal for the preceding 40 years.

=== At-large seats ===
Candidate	Party	Votes	%
Myron Walwyn	National Democratic Party	5,777	16.01
Orlando Smith	National Democratic Party	5,753	15.95
Ronnie W. Skelton	National Democratic Party	5,333	14.78
Archibald C. Christian	National Democratic Party	4,660	12.92
Karl Dawson	Virgin Islands Party	3,420	9.48
Irene Penn-O'Neal	Virgin Islands Party	2,905	8.05
Sharie De Castro	Virgin Islands Party	2,676	7.42
Dancia Penn	Independent	1,837	5.09
Charmaine Rosan-Bunbury	Virgin Islands Party	1,770	4.91
Alvin Christopher	People's Empowerment Party	894	2.48
Natalio Wheatley	People's Empowerment Party	470	1.30
Khoy Smith	People's Coalition Movement	158	0.44
Lorie A. Rymer	People's Empowerment Party	157	0.44
Rawle Richard Hannibald	Independent	119	0.33
Edmund Gregory Maduro	People's Coalition Movement	86	0.24
Ishmael Brathwaite	People's Coalition Movement	64	0.18
Total		36,079	100.00
Valid votes		9,170	98.71
Invalid/blank votes		120	1.29
Total votes		9,290	100.00
Registered voters/turnout		13,585	68.38

== Aftermath ==
Subsequent to the election, Julian Fraser as leader of the VIP congratulated his opponents and pledged to work with the elected Government. Dr Smith echoed those sentiments on behalf of the NDP. Natalio Wheatley gave a statement on behalf of the PEP pledging to continue the work of the party despite its failure at the polls. Leading independent candidate and former Deputy Premier Dancia Penn also made a statement expressing her disappointment about how bitter and divisive the campaign was, and expressing a hope the politicians would show "more unity, fairness, respect and dignity and that they can build a happier and more harmonious country together."

Shortly after the election fresh rumours began to circulate about Dr Smith's possible retirement, and once against Dr Smith spoke to scotch the rumours. Dr Smith turned 71 a couple of months after the election.

After the election political commentators also weighed in on possible reasons for the scale of the VIP's defeat. Suggested reasons included:

- The formation of the PEP by Alvin Christopher, which split off part the VIP's traditional political base, and took away crucial votes.
- The fracture of the party with Dancia Penn (who at one time was deputy premier and was rumoured to be Ralph O'Neal's favoured successor to the party leadership until her defeat in the 2011 general election).
- Lack of veteran leadership. In addition to losing Alvin Christopher and Dancia Penn, Omar Hodge decided not to run again. As a result, an astonishing eight of the VIP's thirteen candidates were contesting their first ever election.
- The personal unpopularity of newly appointed party leader, Julian Fraser.
- Poor candidate selection. Irene Penn-O'Neal was facing gun possession charges whilst running as a candidate (she was subsequently acquitted). Charmaine Rosan Bunbury had been interdicted as Magistrate. Rajah Smith was put up as a token candidate in the second district where he has no real ties, and garnered a mere 22 votes.

After the election the embarrassment for the VIP continued when the two elected candidates (Julian Fraser and Andrew Fahie) were unable to agree which of them should be appointed Leader of the Opposition (each candidate preferring themselves). Governor John Duncan indicated that if no consensus was reached by 20 July 2015 then he would take appropriate advice and choose himself from the available candidates. No consensus was reached, and so the Governor appointed Fraser as opposition leader.

=== Government formation ===
As leader of the party with the largest number of overall seats, Orlando Smith was appointed premier and invited to form a government under the Constitution. He announced an unchanged cabinet, stating "in order to finish the work that have we started, the ministerial architecture will remain in tact [sic], that is, Ministers will remain with their assigned portfolios."

Accordingly, the post-election cabinet will remain:

Cabinet of the British Virgin Islands
Office	Members	Notes
Premier	Orlando Smith	Minister of Finance and Tourism
Governor	John Duncan	
Ministers	Kedrick Pickering; Ronnie Skelton; Mark Vanterpool; Myron Walwyn	Minister for Natural Resources and Labour; Minister for Health and Social Development; Minister for Communications and Works; Minister for Education and Culture
Attorney General	Baba Aziz	Ex-officio, non-voting
Cabinet Secretary	Sandra Ward	
