= List of speakers of the House of Assembly of the British Virgin Islands =

This is a list of speakers and deputy speakers of the House of Assembly of the British Virgin Islands (formerly named the Legislative Council).

Speakers are traditionally appointed from outside the House. The Deputy Speaker is normally a former elected member of the House, and only exercises function when the Speaker is not available.

Six men and two women have served as speaker. Three of the Speakers also served in the Legislative as elected representatives before or after their time as Speaker. The longest serving Speaker, by some length, was Keith L. Flax who served 14 years in the Legislative Council. No other person has served longer than eight years. However, prior to the introduction of Ministerial government in 1967, Henry Creque also served as "Clerk" to the Legislative Council (there being no Speaker). If one includes that period, then the aggregate period served by Henry Creque is 21 years, which is considerably longer.

== Speakers of the House ==
Speakers of the Legislative Council
Speaker	Date of appointment	Date of completion	Style
Henry O. Creque, OBE	1967	1971	Legislative Council
H.R. Penn, MBE	8 July 1971	1975	Legislative Council
Ivan Dawson	1975	1983	Legislative Council
Keith L. Flax	1983	1997	Legislative Council
Reuben W. Vanterpool	1997	2003	Legislative Council
V. Inez Archibald	2003	2007	Legislative Council
Roy Harrigan	14 September 2007	13 September 2011	House of Assembly
Ingrid Moses-Scatliffe	8 December 2011	11 March 2019	House of Assembly
Julian Willock	12 March 2019	3 May 2022	House of Assembly
Corine George-Massicote	26 May 2022	Incumbent	House of Assembly

== Deputy speakers of the House ==
Speakers of the Legislative Council
Deputy Speaker	Date of appointment	Date of completion	Style
Ivan Dawson	1971	1975	Legislative Council
Leopold E. Smith	1975	1978	Legislative Council
Omar Hodge	1979	1983	Legislative Council
Earl P. Fraser	1983	1986	Legislative Council
Terrance B. Lettsome	1986	1990	Legislative Council
Oliver Cills	1990	1995	Legislative Council
Reeial George	1995	16 June 2003	Legislative Council
Eileene L. Parsons	July 2003	2005	Legislative Council
Delores Christopher	2005	2007	Legislative Council
Keith L. Flax	2007	2011	House of Assembly
Delores Christopher	8 December 2011	16 October 2018	House of Assembly
Neville Smith	12 March 2019	10 March 2023	House of Assembly
Stacy Mather	18 May 2023	Incumbent	House of Assembly
