= Roy Harrigan =

Roy Harrigan is a former speaker of the House of Assembly of the British Virgin Islands. He was elected to the position on 14 September 2007 following the 2007 general election and stepped down when the House was dissolved for the 2011 general election.

== Political offices ==
Political offices
Preceded by V. Inez Archibald	Speaker of the House of Assembly; 2007 - 2011	Succeeded by Ingrid Moses-Scatliffe

== See also ==
- List of speakers of the House of Assembly of the British Virgin Islands
