= Progressives United =

Progressives United may refer to:

- a Political Action Committee formed in 2011 by former US Senator, Russ Feingold
- a British Virgin Islands political party formed in 2018 by House of Assembly member Julian Fraser
