= People's Empowerment Party =

People's Empowerment Party may refer to:

- People's Empowerment Party (Barbados) (formed 2006)
- People's Empowerment Party (British Virgin Islands) (2014–2016)
- People's Empowerment Party (Trinidad and Tobago) (2000–2001)
