= Corine George-Massicote =

British Virgin Islands politician

Corine George-Massicote MHA

Speaker of the House of Assembly
- Incumbent
- Assumed office 26 May 2022
- Preceded by: Julian Willock

Corine George-Massicote is a politician from the British Virgin Islands. In 2022, she was appointed Speaker of the House of Assembly.
