= Governor Penn =

Governor Penn may refer to:

- John Penn (governor) (1729–1795), Governor of Colonial Pennsylvania from 1763 to 1771 and from 1773 to 1776
- Richard Penn Sr. (1706–1771), Proprietary and Titular Governor of the Province of Pennsylvania from 1746 to 1771

== See also ==
- Dancia Penn (born 1951), Deputy Governor of the British Virgin Islands from 2004 to 2007
- Richard Penn (governor) (1730s–1811), Lieutenant Governor of the Province of Pennsylvania from 1771 to 1773
