= Deputy Governor of the British Virgin Islands =

The Deputy Governor of the British Virgin Islands is the highest administrative post to be held by a British Virgin Islander. The position was established in 1977.

The incumbent Deputy Governor is empowered under a dormant commission to be the acting Governor of the British Virgin Islands when there is a vacancy in that office - and can also act as Governor when the Governor is either ill or temporarily absent from the British Virgin Islands.

Below is a list of office-holders:

Name	Entered office	Left office
Mr. Alford Penn, OBE	1977	1983
Mr. Elton Georges, OBE, CMG	1983	2003
Mrs. Lisa Penn-Lettsome (acting)	January 2004	September 2004
Mrs. Dancia Penn, OBE, QC	September 20, 2004	April 1, 2007
Mr. Elton Georges, OBE, CMG	April 1, 2007	September 15, 2008
Mrs. Vivian Inez Archibald	September 15, 2008	7 August 2016
Mr. David D. Archer, Jr (acting)	2 June 2016	31 July 2016
Mrs. Rosalie Adams	8 August 2016	28 February 2018
Mr. David D. Archer, Jr	1 March 2018	

== See also ==
- Premier of the Virgin Islands

== Sources ==
- The Deputy Governor's Office
