= Elton Georges =

Marvie Elton Georges CMG OBE (1 May 1943 – 5 April 2018) was a British Virgin Islander politician and businessman. Georges served in a number of public offices, but most notably as the Deputy Governor of the British Virgin Islands from 1983 to 2003, and then again more briefly from 2007 to 2008.

He also served as the Complaints Commissioner of the British Virgin Islands from 2009 to 2015. He has also been recognised as one of the founding figures in relation to the Territory's Department of Disaster Management in the 1970s. As a senior public figure, Georges often spoke out in relation to sensitive political issues.

He served as Chairman of the BVI's Health and Wellness Advisory Council.

In business, he was a director of Seven Seas Water, a division of AquaVenture Holdings. He also acted as a mediator and consultant.

== Personal life ==
Georges received his undergraduate degree from Mount Allison University in mathematics, and a postgraduate diploma in public administration from Carleton University.

He was an active member and lay preacher of the British Virgin Islands Methodist church.

He was married.

== Chess player ==
Elton Georges played for British Virgin Islands in the three Chess Olympiads in row (1976-1980).

== Death ==
Georges died on 4 April 2018 after a short illness.

== Political offices ==
Political offices
Preceded by Alford Penn	Deputy Governor of the British Virgin Islands; 1983 - 2003	Succeeded by Lisa Penn-Lettsome
Preceded by Dancia Penn	Deputy Governor of the British Virgin Islands; 2007 - 2008	Succeeded by Vivian Inez Archibald
