= Alford Penn =

Alford Everett Penn, OBE (14 April 1920 – 28 April 2009) was a British Virgin Islander politician and civil servant. Mr Penn was arguably most notable as the first Deputy Governor of the British Virgin Islands, a post that he held from 1977 to 1983. From 1969 to 1977 he had served as Chief Secretary (as the predecessor office was formerly known prior to 1977).

Penn originally joined the Civil Service as Clerk to the Commissioner (as the Governor of the British Virgin Islands was formerly known). After serving in that capacity for some time, he was transferred to Antigua. From Antigua he served in the Pre-Federal Organisation and eventually went to Trinidad where the capital of the West Indies Federation was situated, and where he served as Clerk of the Federal Legislative and Executive Council of the Leeward Islands.

He was uncle to Qwominer William Osborne.

== Political offices ==
Political offices
Preceded by New office	Deputy Governor of the British Virgin Islands; 1977 - 1983	Succeeded by Elton Georges
