= Ingrid Moses-Scatliffe =

British Virgin Islands lawyer and politician (born 1969)

Ingrid A. Moses-Scatliffe (born 20 October 1969) is a lawyer and politician in the British Virgin Islands. She has served as Speaker of the House of Assembly of the British Virgin Islands since December 2011.

Moses-Scatliffe received a BSc in Computer Information Systems from Saint Augustine's College in the United States, a LLB from the University of Wolverhampton in England and a Bar Vocational Course Post Graduate Diploma and an LLM from the Inns of Court School of Law in England. In 2006, she was admitted to the Bar of England and Wales by the Honourable Society of Lincoln's Inn and to the Bar of the Eastern Caribbean Supreme Court in the Territory of the Virgin Islands. Prior to studying law, Moses-Scatliffe was employed as Head of Operations by Barclays in the British Virgin Islands. From 2007 to 2009, she was Chief Registrar of Lands for the British Virgin Islands. She is managing partner at the British Virgin Islands office of the law firm Travers Thorp Alberga.

Moses-Scatliffe is divorced with one child.

Moses-Scatliffe was named as a potential candidate for the National Democratic Party for the anticipated British Virgin Islands general election, 2019. A number of public figures, the most prominent being Deputy Premier Kedrick Pickering, expressed concern at Moses-Scatliffe being held out as a candidate for a political party whilst occupying the position of Speaker of the House. Ms Moses-Scatliffe refused to confirm or deny that she would be a candidate for the NDP, and the Attorney General rendered an opinion indicating that even if she were, this would not legally preclude her from acting as Speaker of the House in the interim.
