= Vivian Inez Archibald =

British Virgin Islander politician

Vivian Inez Archibald CBE (born 1 February 1945) is a British Virgin Islander politician and businesswoman who has served as the Deputy Governor of the British Virgin Islands since September 2008. On 21 August 2008, Meg Munn, who held the British ministerial portfolio for the Overseas Territories at the time, instructed the Governor of the British Virgin Islands to appoint Archibald as Deputy Governor. Inez Archibald took office as the British Virgin Islands' Deputy Governor on 15 September 2008.

Archibald holds a bachelor's degree in economics and business administration from Rollins College. She also received a master's degree in religion from Stetson University and a second master's degree in divinity from Emory University.

Archibald's husband of forty-eight years, prominent British Virgin Islands lawyer Joseph Archibald, died on 3 April 2014. They had three daughters.

Archibald was appointed Commander of the Order of the British Empire (CBE) for her public service in the 2015 New Year Honours.

== Political offices ==
Political offices
Preceded by Reuben W. Vanterpool	Speaker of the House of Assembly; 2003–2007	Succeeded by Roy Harrigan
Preceded by Elton Georges	Deputy Governor of the British Virgin Islands; 2008–2016	Succeeded by Rosalie Adams
