= Alvin Christopher =

J. Alvin Christopher, is a politician who presently serves as leader of the People's Empowerment Party in the British Virgin Islands. He is not currently a member of the House of Assembly, but was the longstanding elected member for the second district, a position which he held from the 1995 general election until the 2015 general election.

Alvin Christopher was first elected to office as an independent in 1995. Shortly afterwards he was offered the position of Minister of Communication and Works, and joined the governing Virgin Islands Party (VIP). After the 1999 general election he "crossed the floor" to join the opposition National Democratic Party (NDP). In May 2006 Mr Christopher was removed from his position as Minister of Communications and Works by the NDP, and at the next meeting of the legislative council he crossed the floor for a second time to sit once again with the opposition VIP (although not formally joining them as a party). This second move was believed to be related to differences of opinion in relation to the Telecommunications Bill 2006 and telecoms liberalisation programme in the British Virgin Islands generally, although all parties refused to confirm this at the time. Mr Christopher subsequently ran successfully as an independent in the 2007 general election, and was returned with a handsome majority. By the 2011 general election Mr Christopher had formally rejoined the VIP.

In March 2014 Mr Christopher announced he was joining a newly formed political party, the People's Empowerment Party (or PEP) as chairman which he would lead into the 2015 general election, and declared himself "fit" to be Premier. In the end the PEP was crushed in the 2015 general election, winning no seats, and Christopher lost his seat in the House. Christopher was philosophical about his defeat, and vowed not to quit politics.

Christopher has been linked in the media with the new "Progressives United" party formed by Julian Fraser for a possible run in the 2019 election.

== Electoral history ==
J. Alvin Christopher electoral history
Year	District	Party	Votes	Percentage	Winning/losing margin	Result
1995	2nd District	Independent	193	55.9%	+90	Won
1999	2nd District	Virgin Islands Party	484	80.2%	+370	Won
2003	2nd District	National Democratic Party	507	68.3%	+277	Won
2007	2nd District	Independent	484	71.9%	+345	Won
2011	2nd District	Virgin Islands Party	423	52.4%	+99	Won
2015	At-large	People's Empowerment Party	894	2.5%	-3,765*	Lost*
* For at-large candidates (general elections) who won, this is the vote differential from the 5th placed candidate (i.e. the candidate with the highest number of votes who was not elected). For at-large candidates who lose, this is the vote differential from the 4th placed candidate (i.e. the candidate with the lowest number of votes who was elected).

== Offices ==
Political offices
Preceded by Prince Stoutt	House of Assembly Member, 2nd District; 1995 - 2015	Succeeded by Melvin Turnbull Jr.
