= Kedrick Pickering =

The Honourable Dr. Kedrick Pickering

Deputy Premier of the Virgin Islands
- In office 9 November 2011 – 26 February 2019
- Preceded by: Dancia Penn
- Succeeded by: Natalio Wheatley

Personal details
- Born: 8 April 1958 (age 67) Tortola, British Virgin Islands
- Party: National Democratic Party
- Spouse: Alice Marie Pickering (nee Henry)

Dr. Kedrick Pickering (born 8 April 1958) is the former Deputy Premier of the Virgin Islands, also known as the British Virgin Islands. He also served as the territory's Minister of Natural Resources and Labour. He is a member of the National Democratic Party.

Pickering has been described in the British media as "pro-independence".

== Background ==
Pickering was born in Tortola. He grew up in Long Look, East End, Tortola where he still lives today. His father was born in Cuba but was an orphan and was adopted by Virgin Islander Alvin Pickering.

Pickering graduated from the BVI High School (today called the Elmore Stout High School) in 1976. He went on to study at the University of the West Indies, Cave Hill Campus, Barbados. He later earned Bachelor of Medicine and Bachelor of Surgery degrees from the University of the West Indies, Mona Campus, Kingston, Jamaica. He later also earned a Doctor of Medicine degree from the University Hospital of the West Indies, Mona Campus. He is a fellow of the American College of Obstetrics and Gynecology, Washington, D.C.

Pickering was employed as a consultant obstetrician/gynecologist by the territory's government from 1992 until 1999. Before that, he served as a medical officer in the territory from 1986 until 1988. As of 2015, while serving as a Government minister, he still practices gynecology.

Pickering is married to Alice Marie Pickering and is the father of 4 children.

== Career in public life ==
Pickering was first elected to hold public office at the 1999 general election following which he served as a back-bencher. In the 2007 general election, Pickering and his party suffered a defeat at the hands of the Virgin Islands Party, retaining only 2 out of 13 elected seats. In the 2011 general election Pickering returned to office and his National Democratic Party won an overall majority. He was appointed Deputy Premier and Minister of Natural Resources and Labour.

During his political career, Pickering has stood in each election as candidate for the 7th District. He was most recently elected to the House of Assembly at the 2015 general election where he secured 75% of votes in the District. He was re-appointed to serve as Deputy Premier and Minister of Natural Resources and Labour.

He split from the National Democratic Party in 2019, and was voted out of office in the general election later that year. He rejoined the party in 2023 but was unsuccessful in the general election of that year.

== Electoral history ==
Kedrick Pickering electoral history
Year	District	Party	Votes	Percentage	Winning/losing margin	Result
1999	7th District	National Democratic Party	356	60.8%	+247	Won
2003	7th District	National Democratic Party	452	62.8%	+189	Won
2007	7th District	National Democratic Party	351	53.1%	+53	Won
2011	7th District	National Democratic Party	535	70.1%	+379	Won
2015	7th District	National Democratic Party	607	75.3%	+408	Won
2019	7th District	Independent	338	39.3%	-36	Lost; N. Wheatley
2023	At-large	National Democratic Party	2,860		-472*	Lost (6th)
* For at-large candidates (general elections) who won, this is the vote differential from the 5th placed candidate (i.e. the candidate with the highest number of votes who was not elected). For at-large candidates who lose, this is the vote differential from the 4th placed candidate (i.e. the candidate with the lowest number of votes who was elected).

Political offices
Preceded by Dancia Penn	Deputy Premier; 2011 - 2019	Succeeded by Natalio Wheatley
Preceded by Terrance B. Lettsome	House of Assembly Member, 7th District; 1999 - 2019	Succeeded by Natalio Wheatley
