= 1995 British Virgin Islands general election =

General election held in the British Virgin Islands

- 20 February 1995

13 of the 15 seats in the British Virgin Islands Legislative Council 7 seats needed for a majority
- Turnout: 69.21%
	First party	Second party	Third party
Leader	H.L. Stoutt	Conrad Maduro	Walwyn Brewley
Party	VIP	United Party	CCM
Leader since	1971	1967	1994
Leader's seat	1st District	At-large	4th District
Last election	46.54%, 6 seats	8.04%, 0 seats	–
Seats won	6	2	2
Seat change	Steady	▲2	New
Popular vote	5,810	3,292	2,485
Percentage	30.15%	17.09%	12.90%
Chief Minister before election
Lavity Stoutt
VIP
Elected Chief Minister
Lavity Stoutt
VIP

General elections were held in the British Virgin Islands on 20 February 1995. The result was a victory for the incumbent Virgin Islands Party (VIP) led by Chief Minister Lavity Stoutt. The VIP won a plurality of six seats, and thus were able to form a minority government as no other party or coalition could muster a larger number of seats. The BVI United Party (UP) won three seats, and the Concerned Citizens Movement (CCM) won two seats. The two other seats were won by independents. Shortly after the election Alvin Christopher joined the VIP upon being offered a Ministerial seat, giving the VIP an outright majority.

It was the first election to be fought in the British Virgin Islands after the introduction of Territorial at-large seats. Lavity Stoutt had fought hard against the introduction of at-large seats, fearing it would undermine the strong territorial base of the VIP. After his victory he said: "The at-large system was a plot, a plot designed to derail H. Lavity Stoutt. Well it failed. The people have had their say. Their voice has been heard."

The 1995 general election also witnessed the first ever female representatives elected: Ethlyn E. Smith in the Fifth District, and Eileene Parsons as an At-large representative. Eileene Parsons would later join the ruling Virgin Islands Party and become the first ever female Minister for Government in the Territory.

Former Chief Minister, Willard Wheatley ran as an independent in at the at-large seats and was resoundingly rejected by the voters, only winning slightly more votes than were recorded as spoiled ballots (265 against 232).

It was the last election in the British Virgin Islands to be fought prior to the death of Lavity Stoutt.

The supervisor of elections was Eugenie Todman-Smith. The turnout was 68.8%.

== Results ==
Party	District			At-large			Total seats	+/–
Party	Votes	%	Seats	Votes	%	Seats	Total seats	+/–
Virgin Islands Party	2,122	41.76	4	5,810	30.15	2	6	0
United Party	796	15.67	1	3,292	17.09	1	2	+2
Concerned Citizens Movement	1,033	20.33	2	2,485	12.90	0	2	New
Independents	1,130	22.24	2	7,681	39.86	1	3	+1
Speaker and Attorney General							2	0
Total	5,081	100.00	9	19,268	100.00	4	15	+4
Valid votes	5,081	97.41		5,055	95.61			
Invalid/blank votes	135	2.59		232	4.39			
Total votes	5,216	100.00		5,287	100.00			
Registered voters/turnout	7,537	69.21		7,731	68.39			
Source: Elections in the Virgin Islands

=== Notable candidates ===
Notable candidates who were elected to the legislature for the first time included the first two women elected to the legislature, Ethlyn Eugenie Smith and Eileene Parsons; and future Minister, Alvin Christopher. Conversely, Willard Wheatley suffered the worst electoral defeat of his career, and would never run again. Cyril Romney was defeated for the first time since 1975, although he would run again (unsuccessfully) in 1999. Longtime legislators Oliver Cills and Terrance Lettsome were both elected, but neither would stand again after the 1995 election. Lavity Stoutt was also elected, but would die later in the same year. Andre Penn was elected for his only ever term of office; Penn would later be convicted of sexual crimes involving children and sentenced to 12 years in prison.

=== District seats ===
1st District
Candidate	Party	Votes	%
H. Lavity Stoutt	Virgin Islands Party	489	69.66
Andrew Fahie	Independent	197	28.06
Harold L. Vanterpool	BVI United Party	16	2.28
Total		702	100.00
Valid votes		702	98.04
Invalid/blank votes		14	1.96
Total votes		716	100.00
Registered voters/turnout		1,139	62.86

2nd District
Candidate	Party	Votes	%
Alvin Christopher	Independent	193	58.48
Prince MacDonald Stoutt	Virgin Islands Party	103	31.21
Leal Rymer	BVI United Party	34	10.30
Total		330	100.00
Valid votes		330	95.65
Invalid/blank votes		15	4.35
Total votes		345	100.00
Registered voters/turnout		545	63.30

3rd District
Candidate	Party	Votes	%
Oliver Cills	Virgin Islands Party	313	53.50
Maxwell Smith	BVI United Party	272	46.50
Total		585	100.00
Valid votes		585	97.83
Invalid/blank votes		13	2.17
Total votes		598	100.00
Registered voters/turnout		705	84.82

4th District
Candidate	Party	Votes	%
Walwyn Brewley	Concerned Citizens Movement	407	66.94
Arnando Scatliffe	Virgin Islands Party	173	28.45
Donald de Castro	BVI United Party	28	4.61
Total		608	100.00
Valid votes		608	98.38
Invalid/blank votes		10	1.62
Total votes		618	100.00
Registered voters/turnout		912	67.76

5th District
Candidate	Party	Votes	%
Ethlyn Eugenie Smith	Independent	291	51.50
Cyril Romney	Independent	274	48.50
Total		565	100.00
Valid votes		565	95.12
Invalid/blank votes		29	4.88
Total votes		594	100.00
Registered voters/turnout		973	61.05

6th District
Candidate	Party	Votes	%
Omar Hodge	Concerned Citizens Movement	270	42.25
Roy E. Pickering	BVI United Party	194	30.36
Reeso M. Maduro	Independent	175	27.39
Total		639	100.00
Valid votes		639	99.38
Invalid/blank votes		4	0.62
Total votes		643	100.00
Registered voters/turnout		955	67.33

7th District
Candidate	Party	Votes	%
Terrance Lettsome	Virgin Islands Party	259	71.35
Betteto Frett	Concerned Citizens Movement	104	28.65
Total		363	100.00
Valid votes		363	95.78
Invalid/blank votes		16	4.22
Total votes		379	100.00
Registered voters/turnout		589	64.35

8th District
Candidate	Party	Votes	%
Andre Penn	BVI United Party	252	50.10
Louis Walters	Virgin Islands Party	251	49.90
Total		503	100.00
Valid votes		503	97.67
Invalid/blank votes		12	2.33
Total votes		515	100.00
Registered voters/turnout		727	70.84

9th District
Candidate	Party	Votes	%
Ralph T. O'Neal	Virgin Islands Party	534	67.94
Allen O'Neal	Concerned Citizens Movement	252	32.06
Total		786	100.00
Valid votes		786	97.28
Invalid/blank votes		22	2.72
Total votes		808	100.00
Registered voters/turnout		992	81.45

=== At-large seats ===
Candidate	Party	Votes	%
Eileene Parsons	Independent	1,675	8.69
Conrad Maduro	BVI United Party	1,618	8.40
Reeial George	Virgin Islands Party	1,595	8.28
Alred Frett	Virgin Islands Party	1,478	7.67
Neil Blyden	Virgin Islands Party	1,435	7.45
Paul P. Wattley	Independent	1,314	6.82
Earl P. Fraser	Virgin Islands Party	1,302	6.76
Merritt Herbert	BVI United Party	941	4.88
Inez V. Turnbull	Independent	922	4.79
Hubert O'Neal	Concerned Citizens Movement	900	4.67
Belsadys Donovan	Independent	852	4.42
Elihu Rhymer	Concerned Citizens Movement	793	4.12
Carl Dawson	Concerned Citizens Movement	792	4.11
Medita Wheatley	Independent	470	2.44
Fletcher Scatliffe	Independent	439	2.28
Patsy Lake	Independent	439	2.28
Ulric Scatliffe	BVI United Party	388	2.01
Aubrey Levons	Independent	384	1.99
Edmund Maduro	BVI United Party	345	1.79
Edison O'Neal	Independent	341	1.77
Keith George	Independent	339	1.76
Willard Wheatley	Independent	265	1.38
Stanford Connor	Independent	147	0.76
Walter L. de Castro	Independent	94	0.49
Total		19,268	100.00
Valid votes		5,055	95.61
Invalid/blank votes		232	4.39
Total votes		5,287	100.00
Registered voters/turnout		7,731	68.39
