= Delores Christopher =

British Virgin Islands politician

Member of the House of Assembly of the British Virgin Islands for the Fifth District
- In office 16 June 2003 – 20 August 2007
- Preceded by: Ethlyn Smith
- Succeeded by: Elvis Harrigan
- In office 9 November 2011 – 16 October 2018
- Preceded by: Elvis Harrigan
- Succeeded by: Kye Rymer

Personal details
- Born: 27 October 1947 Tortola, British Virgin Islands
- Died: 16 October 2018 (aged 70) Tortola, British Virgin Islands
- Party: National Democratic Party

Delores Christopher (23 October 1947 – 16 October 2018) was a British Virgin Islands politician and businesswoman. She was the third woman elected to the House of Assembly of the British Virgin Islands. She was first elected in the 2003 general election as a representative for the Fifth District on behalf of the National Democratic Party, and subsequently served from 2011 until her death in 2018.

== Early life ==
Christopher was born on 27 October 1947 in the Old Plantation, and raised in the Long Look Estate on Tortola, British Virgin Islands. Her father was Ivan Lettsome, a fisherman and local constable, and her mother was Hilda Potter-Lettsome. She had a brother, Maurice. She grew up attending local schools. She received a diploma in executive secretarial studies from Duff's College in Barbados and a certificate in public administration from the University of the West Indies in Jamaica.

She began her career as a stenographer for the Attorney General’s Chambers. She worked as an administrative officer in the Chief Minister's Office and in the Trade Department, eventually being promoted to head of the Trade Department. She also helped to found the Association for the Advancement of Small Businesses and later served as president.

== Career ==
Christopher contested the 1999 general election as an at-large candidate for the National Democratic Party, the first elections that the party contested. She was first elected to the Legislative Council of the British Virgin Islands in the 2003 general election, becoming the third woman to be elected to the legislature. From 2003 to 2007, she served as a representative for the Fifth District and as a government backbencher. Although she lost her seat in the 2007 general election, she was re-elected in 2011 and 2015. Following the 2011 general election, Christopher was elected to serve as deputy speaker, a position she would hold until her death. She represented the Fifth District for eleven years.

While in office, she helped to found Christmas on Main Street (now Christmas on DeCastro), the Virgin Islands Festival of the Arts, and the 'Buy BVI' Trade Show. She assisted with the creation of the Crafts Alive complex in Road Town, as well as focusing on repairing roads and creating parks in Huntums Ghut and Fahie Hill. Christopher supported establishing a territorial pledge and song, as well as a national museum for local historical artefacts.

== Personal life ==
She met her husband, Robert Christopher, shortly after beginning her career and they married in 1972. They lived together in Mount Healthy and had three children: Troy, Art and Najan Christopher.

Christopher died on 16 October 2018. She was honoured at an official funeral on 3 November 2018, at the Sea Cows Bay Methodist Church. Following her death, the Virgin Islands Festival of the Arts was renamed in her honour and she was honoured at the 20th Christmas on DeCastro Street on 1 December 2018.
