= People's Empowerment Party (British Virgin Islands) =

Defunct political party in the British Virgin Islands

- Leader: Alvin Christopher
- Founded: 2014
- Ideology: Conservatism
- House of Assembly: 0 / 13

The People's Empowerment Party (or PEP) is a defunct political party in the British Virgin Islands, led by former House of Assembly member for the second district Alvin Christopher. Mr Christopher has previously been elected as a representative of the Virgin Islands Party, the National Democratic Party and as an independent. It has no elected representatives and may now be defunct.

The party was launched on 29 March 2014. The inaugural executive committee of the party included former People's Patriotic Alliance (PPA) member, Natalio Wheatley (also known as Sowande Uhuru) as president; Elford Parsons, vice-president; Claudette Rymer, secretary; Julia Christopher, assistant secretary; Dennis Rhymer, treasurer; Lorie Rymer, public relations officer; Sunny Prince, sergeant-at-arms; and Glanville Penn, chaplain. Mr Christopher is the chairman and leader of the new party. The introduction of the party to the public included a blistering attack on the former administration of the Virgin Islands Party, which is the party that a number of the PEP members formerly had ties to.

Plans for the new political party were announced in the press in August 2013, although private discussions may have occurred much earlier.

Apart from Mr Christopher, only Mr Wheatley and Mr Rymer had previously stood for political office (both unsuccessfully). In the press it was speculated that proposed candidates may include former elected VIP politicians Dancia Penn and Vernon Malone, but in the event that did not transpire. The party had announced that it intended to contest all 13 seats in the 2015 general election. Eventually the party only put 5 candidates forward, all of whom were handily defeated (including Mr Christopher, who had previously held his seat in the legislature for 20 years).

In November 2016 Natalio Wheatley left the PEP to join the Virgin Islands Party, and the party fielded no candidates in the 2019 British Virgin Islands general election.
