= Julian Willock =

British Virgin Islands politician

Julian Willock is a British Virgin Islander politician who served as Speaker of House of Assembly of the British Virgin Islands.
