= 1999 British Virgin Islands general election =

← 1995	17 May 1999	2003 →

13 of the 15 seats in the House of Assembly 7 seats needed for a majority
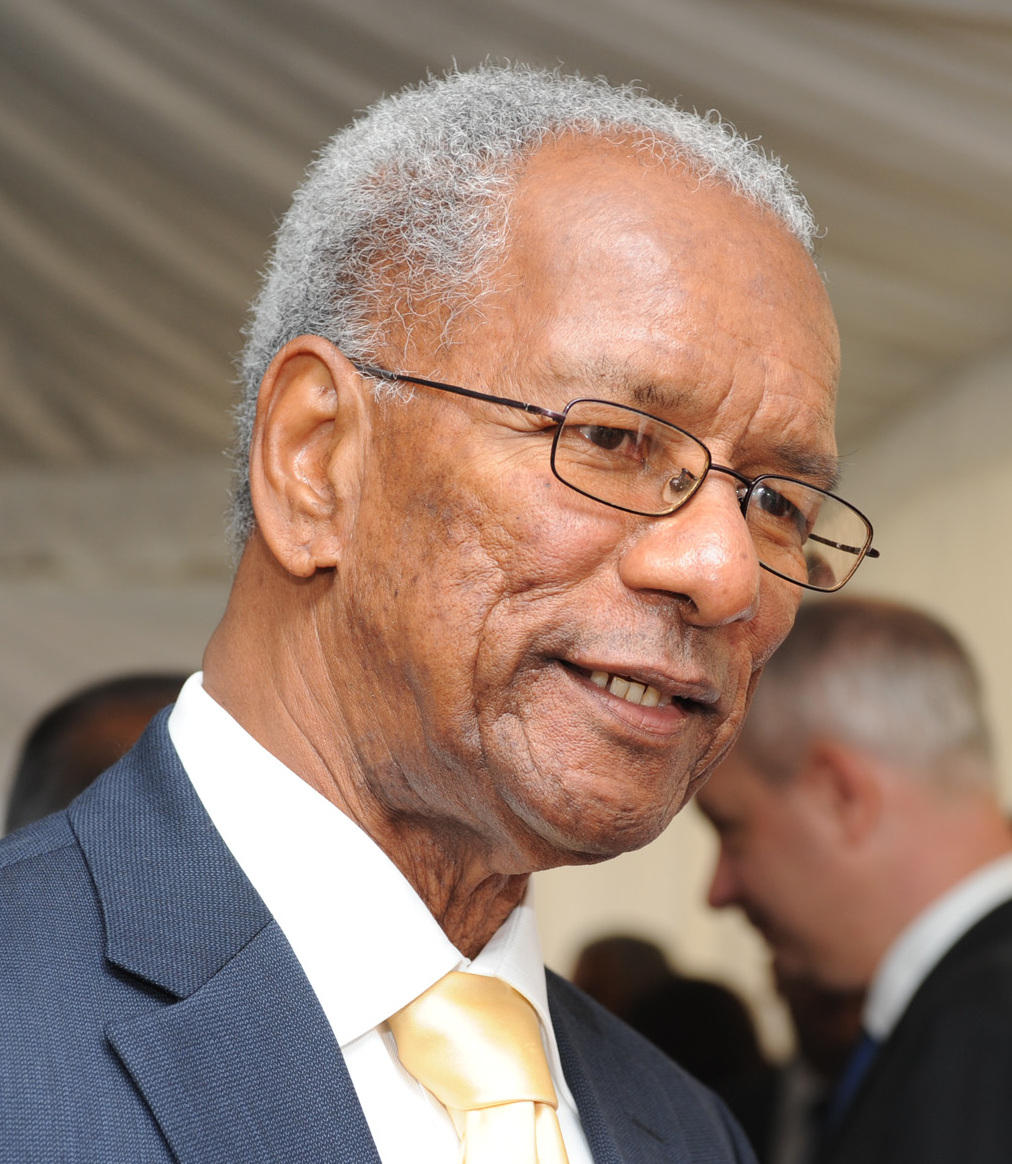

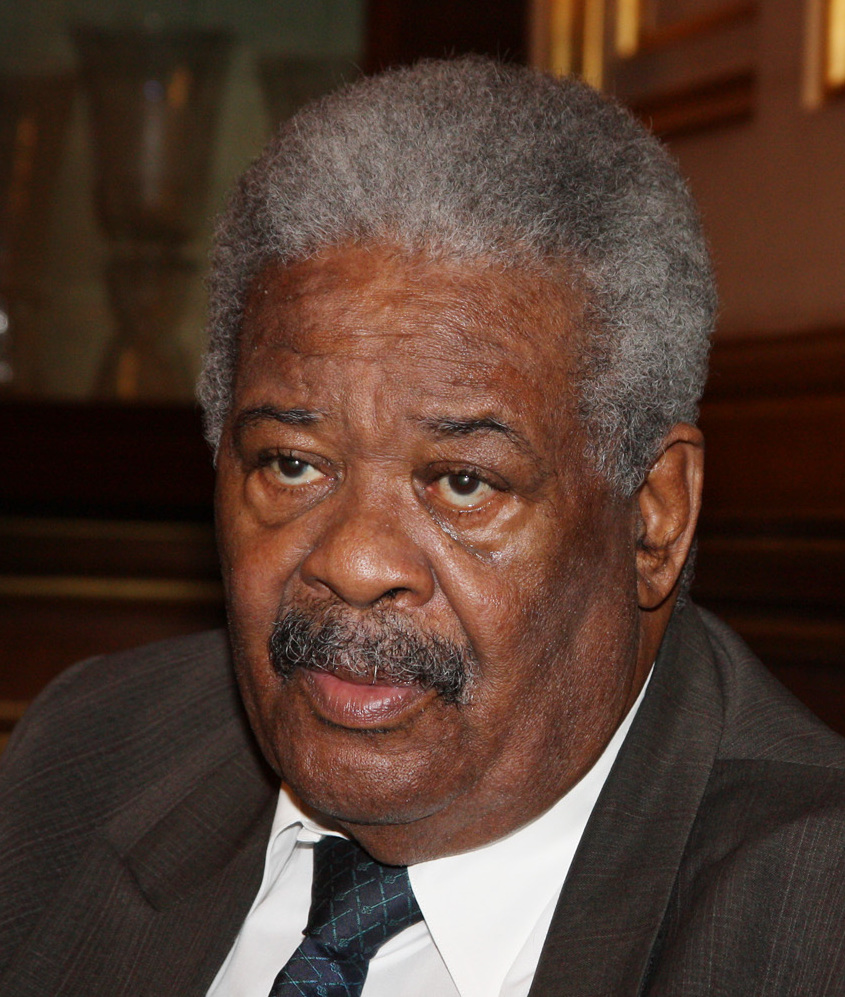
	First party	Second party
Leader	Orlando Smith	Ralph T. O'Neal
Party	NDP	VIP
Last election	–	30.15%, 6 seats
Seats won	5	7
Seat change	New	▲1
Popular vote	9,126	8,790
Percentage	38.14%	36.74%
Chief Minister before election
Ralph T. O'Neal
VIP
Chief Minister after election
Ralph T. O'Neal
VIP

General elections were held in the British Virgin Islands on 17 May 1999. The result was a victory for the incumbent Virgin Islands Party (VIP) led by Chief Minister Ralph T. O'Neal over the newly formed National Democratic Party (NDP) led by Orlando Smith.

The elections marked the emergence of the NDP, the first serious opposition to the VIP since the collapse of the United Party in the aftermath of Cyril Romney's resignation as Chief Minister in 1986. They were also the first elections in the territory since 1954 in which Lavity Stoutt, a dominant political force in the British Virgin Islands did not participate and the first in which no independent candidates were elected.

== Results ==
The election was largely decided in three key seats: the Third District (which Julian Fraser carried for the VIP by 26 votes), the Sixth District (which Omar Hodge carried for the VIP by 12 votes) and the Eighth District (which Lloyd Black carried for the NDP by 11 votes, with the crucial Penn family votes being split between Andre (running as an independent) and David (running for the VIP) – most years a member of the Penn family wins the Eighth District). The At-large seats were split equally between the two main parties. Ethlyn Smith won the Fifth District for the minority party, the Concerned Citizens Movement, where the second placed candidate was former Chief Minister running as an independent, Cyril Romney.

Although the overall vote count was flattering to the NDP this was because they polled well in the At-large seats (where each voter casts four votes). But most of the Territorial seats were not that competitive, with the VIP winning some seats with huge majorities, the largest being Alvin Christopher's thumping 80.2% of the vote in the Second District. Conversely, Julian Fraser won his seat in the Third District with the smallest mandate of any candidate – just 228 votes in a three-way contest with a low voter turnout.

Notable candidates who were elected to the Legislature for the first time included future Chief Minister and Premier, Orlando Smith; future Deputy Premier and Minister Kedrick Pickering; future Minister Andrew Fahie; and future Minister and Leader of the Opposition Julian Fraser. Conversely, Walwyn Brewley suffered the first electoral defeat of his career, and would thereafter choose to end his political career at this point.

Party	District			At-large			Total seats	+/–
Party	Votes	%	Seats	Votes	%	Seats	Total seats	+/–
National Democratic Party	2,044	32.67	3	9,126	38.14	2	5	New
Virgin Islands Party	2,649	42.34	5	8,790	36.74	2	7	+1
United Party	400	6.39	0	1,923	8.04	0	0	–2
Concerned Citizens Movement	536	8.57	1	670	2.80	0	1	–1
Independents	627	10.02	0	3,418	14.29	0	0	–3
Speaker and Attorney General							2	0
Total	6,256	100.00	9	23,927	100.00	4	15	0
Valid votes	6,256	98.15		6,069	98.76			
Invalid/blank votes	118	1.85		76	1.24			
Total votes	6,374	100.00		6,145	100.00			
Registered voters/turnout	9,523	66.93		9,523	64.53			
Source: Elections in the Virgin Islands

=== District seats ===
1st District
Candidate	Party	Votes	%
Andrew Fahie	Virgin Islands Party	528	78.92
Elvin O. Stoutt	Independent	141	21.08
Total		669	100.00
Valid votes		669	97.38
Invalid/blank votes		18	2.62
Total votes		687	100.00
Registered voters/turnout		1,140	60.26

2nd District
Candidate	Party	Votes	%
Alvin Christopher	Virgin Islands Party	484	80.94
Enriquito Rhymer	National Democratic Party	114	19.06
Total		598	100.00
Valid votes		598	99.17
Invalid/blank votes		5	0.83
Total votes		603	100.00
Registered voters/turnout		1,023	58.94

3rd District
Candidate	Party	Votes	%
Julian Fraser	Virgin Islands Party	228	39.45
Michael Thomas	National Democratic Party	202	34.95
Maxwell Smith	BVI United Party	148	25.61
Total		578	100.00
Valid votes		578	97.31
Invalid/blank votes		16	2.69
Total votes		594	100.00
Registered voters/turnout		914	64.99

4th District
Candidate	Party	Votes	%
Mark Vanterpool	National Democratic Party	453	61.80
Walwyn Brewley	Concerned Citizens Movement	258	35.20
Gregory Hodge	BVI United Party	22	3.00
Total		733	100.00
Valid votes		733	97.99
Invalid/blank votes		15	2.01
Total votes		748	100.00
Registered voters/turnout		1,091	68.56

5th District
Candidate	Party	Votes	%
Ethlyn Eugenie Smith	Concerned Citizens Movement	278	38.56
Cyril Romney	Independent	233	32.32
Hugo Vanterpool	Virgin Islands Party	160	22.19
Ulric Scatliffe	BVI United Party	50	6.93
Total		721	100.00
Valid votes		721	98.36
Invalid/blank votes		12	1.64
Total votes		733	100.00
Registered voters/turnout		1,202	60.98

6th District
Candidate	Party	Votes	%
Omar Hodge	Virgin Islands Party	367	46.28
Elvis Harrigan	National Democratic Party	355	44.77
Edmund Maduro	BVI United Party	71	8.95
Total		793	100.00
Valid votes		793	98.02
Invalid/blank votes		16	1.98
Total votes		809	100.00
Registered voters/turnout		1,174	68.91

7th District
Candidate	Party	Votes	%
Kedrick Pickering	National Democratic Party	356	62.24
Collingston George	BVI United Party	109	19.06
Birton Lettsome	Virgin Islands Party	107	18.71
Total		572	100.00
Valid votes		572	97.61
Invalid/blank votes		14	2.39
Total votes		586	100.00
Registered voters/turnout		812	72.17

8th District
Candidate	Party	Votes	%
Lloyd Black	National Democratic Party	264	39.11
Andre JJ Penn	Independent	253	37.48
David A. Penn	Virgin Islands Party	158	23.41
Total		675	100.00
Valid votes		675	98.83
Invalid/blank votes		8	1.17
Total votes		683	100.00
Registered voters/turnout		928	73.60

9th District
Candidate	Party	Votes	%
Ralph T. O'Neal	Virgin Islands Party	617	67.28
Hubert O'Neal	National Democratic Party	300	32.72
Total		917	100.00
Valid votes		917	98.50
Invalid/blank votes		14	1.50
Total votes		931	100.00
Registered voters/turnout		1,239	75.14

=== At-large seats ===
Candidate	Party	Votes	%
Orlando Smith	National Democratic Party	3,094	12.93
Reeial George	Virgin Islands Party	3,015	12.60
Ronnie Skelton	National Democratic Party	2,675	11.18
Eileene Parsons	Virgin Islands Party	2,288	9.56
Paul Wattley	National Democratic Party	1,897	7.93
Irene Penn-O'Neal	Virgin Islands Party	1,835	7.67
Roy Pickering	Virgin Islands Party	1,652	6.90
Delores Christopher	National Democratic Party	1,460	6.10
Alred Frett	Independent	1,457	6.09
Neil Blyden	Independent	919	3.84
Conrad Maduro	BVI United Party	723	3.02
Keith L. Flax	Independent	537	2.24
Merritt Herbert	BVI United Party	505	2.11
Charles Mercer	BVI United Party	451	1.88
Carl Dawson	Concerned Citizens Movement	345	1.44
Betteto Frett	Concerned Citizens Movement	325	1.36
Edison O'Neal	BVI United Party	244	1.02
Fletcher Scatliffe	Independent	209	0.87
Eileene Baronville	Independent	199	0.83
Noel Lloyd	Independent	97	0.41
Total		23,927	100.00
Valid votes		6,069	98.76
Invalid/blank votes		76	1.24
Total votes		6,145	100.00
Registered voters/turnout		9,523	64.53
