= Dancia Penn =

British Virgin Islands judge

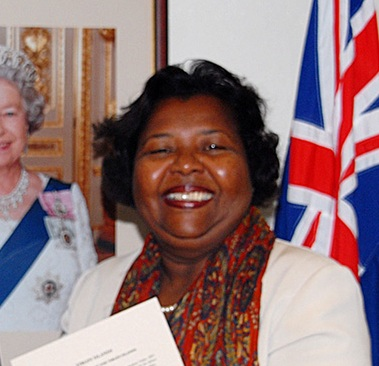
Dancia Penn-Sallah

Ruth Dancia Penn, OBE KC (born 1951) is a British Virgin Islands politician and former Deputy Governor of the British Virgin Islands from 20 September 2004 to 1 April 2007. She also formerly served as the Attorney General of the British Virgin Islands from 1992 to 1999.

Penn was the first woman to be appointed Deputy Governor, and the first British Virgin Islander to serve as Attorney General.

She served briefly as the acting Governor of the British Virgin Islands during 2006 in the gap between Tom Macan leaving office and David Pearey taking up his appointment.

Professionally Dancia Penn goes by her maiden name, but her legal name has been changed to Mrs Dancia Penn-Sallah since her marriage to Captain Sallah, former Registrar of Ships in the British Virgin Islands.

== Politics ==
In July 2007, Penn announced her candidacy to stand for the 8th district in the General Election held on 20 August 2007 in the British Virgin Islands on behalf of the Virgin Islands Party (VIP). She was elected to office, defeating the incumbent Lloyd Black, and she was appointed the Minister of Health and Welfare, and as the Deputy Premier of the British Virgin Islands. However, in the General Election held on 7 November 2011 she lost her 8th district seat to Marlon Penn.

There had been considerable speculation after the 2007 that when the then Premier of the British Virgin Islands, Ralph T. O'Neal retired, Penn would be named as his successor as leader of the Virgin Islands Party, and would thereby become the first female Premier in the Territory. Her defeat in the 2011 election precluded (or at least deferred) that possibility. Penn subsequently ran again for the legislature in the 2015 General Election, but ran as an independent rather than as a Virgin Islands Party candidate, and ran at-large rather than for the 8th district. She was not elected in 2015.

== Judicial ==
In 2007, Penn took up a temporary appointment as an acting judge of the Court of Appeal of the Eastern Caribbean Supreme Court. She was required to give up that appointment shortly after formally entering politics as a candidate.

== Electoral history ==
Dancia Penn electoral history
Year	District	Party	Votes	Percentage	Winning/losing margin	Result
2007	8th District	Virgin Islands Party	453	52.4%	+64	Won
2011	8th District	Virgin Islands Party	423	38.8%	-101	Lost; M. Penn
2015	At-large	Independent	1,837	5.1%	-2,822	Lost*
2019	At-large	Independent	1,607	4.1%	-2,329	Lost*
* For at-large candidates (general elections) who won, this is the vote differential from the 5th placed candidate (i.e. the candidate with the highest number of votes who was not elected). For at-large candidates who lose, this is the vote differential from the 4th placed candidate (i.e. the candidate with the lowest number of votes who was elected).

== Offices ==
Political offices
Preceded by Karl Trotman	Attorney General of the British Virgin Islands; 1992–1999	Succeeded by Cherno Jallow
Preceded by Elton Georges	Deputy Governor of the British Virgin Islands; 2004–2007	Succeeded by Elton Georges
Preceded by Lloyd Black	House of Assembly Member, 8th District; 2007–2011	Succeeded by Marlon Penn

== Sources ==
- Island Sun
