= Julian Fraser =

British Virgin Islands politician

The Honourable Julian Fraser MHA
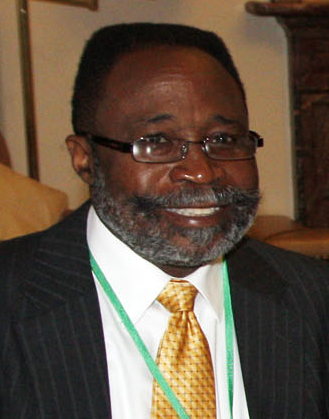

Deputy Premier of the British Virgin Islands
- In office 5 May 2022 – 27 April 2023
- Monarchs: Elizabeth II; Charles III
- Governor: John Rankin
- Preceded by: Marlon Penn
- Succeeded by: Ronnie Skelton
- In office 21 July 2015 – 5 February 2017
- Monarch: Elizabeth II
- Governor: John Duncan
- Preceded by: Ralph T. O'Neal
- Succeeded by: Andrew Fahie

Personal details
- Born: 5 July 1950 (age 75) Tortola, British Virgin Islands
- Party: Progressives United (2018–present)
- Other political affiliations: Virgin Islands Party (1999–2018)
- Spouse: Kharid Fraser
- Children: 1

Julian Fraser (born 5 July 1950) is a British Virgin Islander politician who formerly belonged to the opposition Virgin Islands Party in the British Virgin Islands, and in August 2018 formed a new party, Progressives United.

He is currently the Member of the House of Assembly for the Third District (Sea Cow's Bay), a position which he has held since the 1999 general election. He was elected as Chairman of the Virgin Islands Party on 28 May 2014. After the 2015 general election, he was officially appointed the Leader of the Opposition under the Constitution. On 30 November 2016, Andrew Fahie replaced Julian Fraser as party leader, making Fraser the first leader of the Virgin Islands Party (and the only one so far) not to ascend to either the Chief Minister or Premiership.

In 2024, he entered into a coalition with the governing Virgin Islands Party and was appointed Deputy Premier.

== Early life and education ==
Julian Fraser was born on 5 July 1950 to Andrew and Frances Fraser. He is married to Kharid Fraser, the former Accountant General of the British Virgin Islands, with whom he has one son, Jamil.

He attended high school in the British Virgin Islands before studying for an associate degree, and a five-year Certificate in Architecture from the Institute of Design and Construction. He then studied at the New York Institute of Technology, where he received a Bachelor of Science (Magna Cum Laude) and a Bachelor of Architecture (Cum Laude). He is a registered Architect in the State of New York, and a member of the American Institute of Architects. His personal website claims that he was the project architect for the US$2.2 billion building of the World Financial Center, New York whilst he worked at the firm of Haines Lundberg Whaler.

== Third District ==
Julian Fraser was appointed the Virgin Islands Party candidate for the Third District in 1999. From 1971 to 1999, the district was represented by Oliver Cills (who is a cousin to Julian Fraser), except for between 1983 and 1986 when it was represented by Earl Fraser (who is brother to Julian Fraser). Since 1971, the Third District has been continuously represented by grandchildren of James and Isabella Cills.

== Political career ==
Upon his election in 1999, Julian Fraser was appointed Minister for Natural Resources and Labour, a position he held until 2002, when he was appointed Deputy Chief Minister and Minister for Communications and Works. In 2003, the Virgin Islands Party lost power, and he served as a member of the opposition until returning to power in 2007, when he was re-appointed Minister of Communications and Works. He held that position until 2011, when the Virgin Islands Party lost power again.

He led the Virgin Islands Party into the 2015 general election, where he suffered a landslide defeat to the incumbent National Democratic Party, but retained his position as party leader for another year before being ousted.

In January 2018, the Virgin Islands Party announced it was "done" with Fraser and would seek another candidate to stand in the 3rd District at the next general election. Fraser confirmed he would contest the next election for a new party which he intended to form. He won his seat in the 2019 general election and retained it in 2023.

In October 2024, in a surprise move, he returned to the Cabinet as Deputy Premier and Minister for Environment, Natural Resources, and Climate Change and as Minister for Labour and Immigration, replacing Lorna Smith in coalition with the VIP government.

== Leader of the opposition ==
=== First time ===
After Fraser was made leader of the Virgin Islands Party in 2014, Ralph O'Neal remained the official Leader of the opposition under the territory's constitution until he stood down in the general election in June 2015. In that election, only two members of the Virgin Islands Party won their seats – Fraser and Andrew Fahie. Subsequently, Fraser and Fahie argued over who should be named as leader of the opposition, as Fahie believed he should take over as party leader following the general election defeat. As the Constitution required that the leader of the opposition commanded a support of the "majority" of the opposition members, and the only two opposition members disagreed, there was an impasse. Governor John Duncan gave the men a month to resolve their differences, but they were unable to do so, and eventually the Governor appointed Fraser as the official leader of the opposition. Fahie would later oust Fraser as party leader and would then be appointed leader of the opposition in his stead.

=== Second time ===
On 5 May 2022, after the Virgin Islands Party and National Democratic Party formed a unified government, Fraser was appointed as leader of the opposition for a second time, being the sole remaining member of the House of Assembly who was not a member of either party or otherwise in Cabinet.

== Controversy ==
In 2014, Fraser faced controversy in relation to his handling of the Sea Cow's Bay Harbour Development Project in the Third District. The Auditor General issued a report on the Project which highlighted several discrepancies, including the fact that the cost of the project rose dramatically from an initial estimate of US$1.4 million to over US$6.6 million. Documentation which would have provided details of the spending were found to have gone missing, but two of Fraser's brothers (Earl Fraser and Kenneth Fraser) had received substantial payments for work that was never done, according to the report. Fraser strenuously denied wrongdoing, and argued the report was part of the governing National Democratic Party campaign to poison his name. Fraser's brother, Earl, who was also criticised in the report, refused to comment. The matter was also subject to highly critical comment in the report of Sir Gary Hickinbottom following the 2021 Commission of Inquiry.

In a separate matter, Fraser was accused in the House of trying to sign a contract for the government to pay his brother for the lease of certain land which actually belonged to the government at the time. Fraser has disputed those allegations.

== Electoral history ==
Julian Fraser electoral history
Year	District	Party	Votes	Percentage	Winning/losing margin	Result
1999	3rd District	Virgin Islands Party	228	38.4%	+26	Won
2003	3rd District	Virgin Islands Party	473	58.8%	+148	Won
2007	3rd District	Virgin Islands Party	440	71.1%	+261	Won
2011	3rd District	Virgin Islands Party	613	52.4%	+56	Won
2015	3rd District	Virgin Islands Party	596	51.5%	+35	Won
2019	3rd District	Progressives United	519	46.9%	+225	Won
2023	3rd District	Progressives United	459	46.2%	+112	Won

Political offices
Preceded by Ralph O'Neal	Leader of the Opposition; 2015–2017	Succeeded by Andrew Fahie
Preceded by Oliver Cills	House of Assembly Member, 3rd District; 1999–present	Succeeded by Incumbent
Preceded by Marlon Penn	Leader of the Opposition; 2022-2023	Succeeded by Ronnie Skelton
