= Ethlyn Smith =

British Virgin Islands politician and accountant (1940–2007)

- Born: Ethlyn Eugenie Smith; 23 April 1940; Huntums Ghut, Tortola, British Leeward Islands
- Died: 31 December 2007 (aged 67); Road Town, Tortola, British Virgin Islands
- Occupations: accountant, politician
- Years active: 1960–2003

Ethlyn Smith (23 April 1940 – 31 December 2007) was a civil servant from the British Virgin Islands, who became one of the first two women elected to the House of Assembly of the British Virgin Islands. After a career of more than two decades as an accountant and public administrator in the civil service of the British Virgin Islands, Smith retired and entered politics. She contested her first election in 1995 as an independent, winning the 5th District. She was reelected to the post in 1999, serving until her defeat in the 2003 elections.

== Early life ==
Ethlyn Eugenie Smith was born on 23 April 1940 in the village of Huntums Ghut, on the island of Tortola, at the time a British colony known as the British Leeward Islands to Gladys and Ernest Smith. She completed her primary and secondary education in the islands and worked briefly as a clerical trainee in the civil service of the island. To further her education, she pursued an associates degree from the College of the Virgin Islands in Charlotte Amalie, in the U. S. Virgin Islands. She completed her degree program in accounting in 1968 and went on for further studies at Wandsworth Technical College in London and at the University of Calgary. She graduated from Calgary in 1970 with a bachelor's degree in accounting. During her schooling the country was decolonized and became the British Virgin Islands (BVI), one of the dependencies of the British Overseas Territories.

== Career ==
Returning to BVI that same year, Smith returned to the civil service and was made the Accountant General, becoming the first woman to hold the post. She was promoted to the Permanent Secretary of the Ministry of Communications and Works 1976. Desiring to further her education, Smith was awarded a Hubert Humphrey Fellowship in 1983 and attended Pennsylvania State University, attaining a master's degree in public administration the following year. In 1989, she transferred to the Ministry of Natural Resources and Labour. Retiring in 1992, Smith traveled for a few years and worked with various clubs in community service before entering politics.

In 1995, Smith and five other women ran for public office as independent candidates. Each of the women ran as independent, and five ran as at-large candidates, to show that women understood the political system and realized that national interests should take precedence over district influences. Smith was one of two winners in the election, unseating Cyril Romney who had held the 5th District constituency for over a decade. Eileene L. Parsons and Ethlyn Smith became the first two women elected to serve in the legislative council of the BVI.

During her legislative career, Smith was appointed a delegate to the Commonwealth Parliamentary Association Conferences, attending the meetings held in 1995 in Sri Lanka, in 1996 in Malaysia and in 1997 in Mauritius. In 1999 she ran for reelection in the 5th District as a candidate for the Concerned Citizens Movement. She was the only member from her party to be elected and served as a member of the opposition, until 2000, when she was appointed to serve as Minister for Health and Welfare. Smith contested the 2003 general elections for the 5th District as candidate for the Virgin Islands Party, but was defeated by Delores Christopher with a margin of three votes.

== Death and legacy ==
Smith died on 31 December 2007 at Peebles Hospital in Road Town on Tortola.
